= British Fantasy Award for Best Collection =

Annual literary award for speculative fiction

- Awarded for: Collection of works by a single author
- Country: United Kingdom
- Presented by: British Fantasy Society
- First award: 1991; 35 years ago
- Most recent winner: Call And Response by Christopher Caldwell
- Website: britishfantasysociety.org
- Related: British Fantasy Award for Best Anthology

The British Fantasy Award for Best Collection is a literary award given annually as part of the British Fantasy Awards.

== History ==
The award was originally given to both anthologies and collections. After 1998, the award was divided into the British Fantasy Award for Best Collection and another award for Best Anthology.

== Winners and shortlists ==
=== Combined Anthology/Collection Award ===
* Winners

Best Anthology/Collection
Year	Author/Editor	Work	Publisher	Ref.
1991	Stephen Jones, ed.*	Best New Horror	Robinson	
1991	Ramsey Campbell, ed.*	Best New Horror	Robinson	
1991	Thomas F. Monteleone, ed.	Borderlands	Borderlands Press	
1991	Stephen Jones, ed.	Dark Voices: The Pan Book of Horror	Pan Books	
1991	David Sutton, ed.	Dark Voices: The Pan Book of Horror	Pan Books	
1991	Stephen King	Four Past Midnight	Viking Press	
1991	Richard Dalby, ed.	The Mammoth Book of Ghost Stories	Robinson	
1992	Nicholas Royle, ed.*	Darklands	Egerton Press	
1992	Thomas F. Monteleone, ed.	Borderlands 2	Borderlands Press	
1992	David Sutton, ed.	Dark Voices	Pan Books	
1992	Stephen Jones, ed.	Dark Voices	Pan Books	
1993	Nicholas Royle, ed.*	Darklands 2	Egerton Press	
1994	David Sutton, ed.*	Dark Voices 5	Pan Books	
1994	Stephen Jones, ed.*	Dark Voices 5	Pan Books	
1995	Joel Lane*	The Earth Wire and Other Stories	Egerton Press	
1995	Paul Lewis, ed.	Cold Cuts II	Alun Press	
1995	Steve Lockley, ed.	Cold Cuts II	Alun Press	
1995	Ellen Datlow, ed.	Little Deaths	Millenium	
1995	Kim Newman	The Original Dr Shade and Other Stories	Simon & Schuster	
1995	Janny Wurts	This Way Lies Camelot	HarperCollins	
1996	Andy Cox, ed.*	Last Rites and Resurrections	TTA Press	
1996	Paul Lewis, ed.	Cold Cuts III	Alun Press	
1996	Steve Lockley, ed.	Cold Cuts III	Alun Press	
1996	Ellen Datlow, ed.	Little Deaths	Millenium	
1996	Stephen Jones, ed.	Dark Terrors	Gollancz	
1996	David Sutton, ed.	Dark Terrors	Gollancz	
1996	Kim Newman	Famous Monsters	Pocket UK	
1996	Neil Gaiman	The Sandman: World's End	Vertigo	
1997	Thomas Ligotti*	The Nightmare Factory	Raven Books / Carroll & Graf Publishers	
1997	Chaz Brenchley	Blood Waters	Flambard Press	
1997	Stephen Jones, ed.	Dark Terrors 2	Gollancz	
1997	David Sutton, ed.	Dark Terrors 2	Gollancz	
1997	Stephen Jones, ed.	The Mammoth Book of Best New Horror: Volume Seven	Raven Books / Carroll & Graf Publishers	
1997	Shirley Jackson	The Masterpieces of Shirley Jackson	Raven Books / Carroll & Graf Publishers	
1997	Neil Gaiman, ed.	The Sandman: Book of Dreams	Harper Prism / HarperCollins	
1997	Edward E. Kramer, ed.	The Sandman: Book of Dreams	Harper Prism / HarperCollins	
1998	Stephen Jones, ed.*	Dark Terrors 3	Gollancz	
1998	David Sutton, ed.*	Dark Terrors 3	Gollancz	
1998	Mike Ashley, ed.	Chronicles of the Round Table	Carroll & Graf Publishers	
1998	Barbara Roden, ed.	Midnight Never Comes	Ash-Tree Press	
1998	Christopher Roden, ed.	Midnight Never Comes	Ash-Tree Press	
1998	Neil Gaiman	The Sandman: The Wake	Titan Books	
1998	Andrew Haigh, ed.	Scaremongers	Tanjen	

=== Award for Best Collection ===
Best Collection
Year	Author	Work	Publisher	Ref.
1999	Ramsey Campbell*	Ghosts and Grisly Things	Pumpkin Books	
1999	Brian Lumley	A Coven of Vampires	Fedogan & Bremer / Headline Publishing Group	
1999	Ray Bradbury	Driving Blind	Avon Books / Earthlight	
1999	Tim Lebbon	Faith in the Flesh	Razorblade Press	
1999	Graham Masterton	Manitou Man: The Worlds of Graham Masterton	British Fantasy Society	
1999	Ray Clark	Manitou Man: The Worlds of Graham Masterton	British Fantasy Society	
1999	Matt Williams	Manitou Man: The Worlds of Graham Masterton	British Fantasy Society	
1999	Mike Chinn	The Paladin Mandates	Alchemy Press	
1999	Christopher Fowler	Personal Demons	Serpent's Tail	
1999	Jo Fletcher	Shadows of Light and Dark	Alchemy Press	
2000	Peter Crowther*	Lonesome Roads	Razorblade Press	
2000	Robert Aickman	The Collected Strange Stories	Tartarus Press / Durtro	
2000	Stephen King	Hearts in Atlantis	Hodder & Stoughton	
2000	Charles de Lint	Moonlight and Vines	Tor Books	
2000	Michael Marshall Smith	What You Make It	HarperCollins UK	
2001	Kim Newman*	Where the Bodies Are Buried	Alchemy Press	
2001	Robert E. Howard	The Conan Chronicles, 1	Gollancz	
2001	Terry Lamsley	Dark Matters	Ash-Tree Press	
2001	Stephen Laws	Midnight Man	Silver Salamander Press	
2001	R. Chetwynd-Hayes	Phantom & Fiends	Robert Hale	
2002	Paul Finch*	Aftershocks	Ash-Tree Press	
2002	Tim Lebbon	As the Sun Goes Down	Night Shade Books	
2002	Robert E. Howard	The Conan Chronicles Volume Two: The Hour of the Dragon	Gollancz	
2002	Michael Moorcock	London Bone	Scribner	
2002	Peter Straub	Magic Terror: Seven Tales	HarperCollins	
2003	Ramsey Campbell*	Ramsey Campbell, Probably: On Horror and Sundry Fantasies	PS Publishing	
2003	Clark Ashton Smith	The Emperor of Dreams	Gollancz	
2003	Stephen King	Everything's Eventual	Hodder & Stoughton	
2003	Ursula K. Le Guin	Tales from Earthsea	Gollancz	
2003	Andrew Hook	The Virtual Menagerie	Elastic Press	
2004	Ramsey Campbell*	Told by the Dead	PS Publishing	
2004	Christopher Fowler	Demonized	Serpent's Tail	
2004	Michael Marshall Smith	More Tomorrow & Other Stories	Earthling Publications	
2004	M. John Harrison	Things That Never Happen	Night Shade Books	
2004	Mark Samuels	The White Hands and Other Weird Tales	Tartarus Press	
2005	Stephen Gallagher*	Out of His Mind	PS Publishing	
2005	Paul Finch	Darker Ages	Sarob Press	
2005	Allen Ashley	Somnambulists	Elastic Press	
2005	M. John Harrison	Things That Never Happen	Gollancz	
2005	Lucius Shepard	Trujillo and Other Stories	PS Publishing	
2006	Joe Hill*	20th Century Ghosts	PS Publishing	
2006	Andrew Hook	Beyond Each Blue Horizon	Crowswing Books	
2006	Simon Clark	Hotel Midnight	Robert Hale	
2006	Tim Lee	The Life to Come	Elastic Press	
2006	Stuart Young	The Mask Behind the Face and Other Stories	Pendragon Press	
2006	Leigh Brackett	Sea Kings of Mars and Otherworldly Stories	Gollancz	
2007	Neil Gaiman*	Fragile Things	Headline Publishing Group	
2007	Christopher Teague	Choices	Pendragon Press	
2007	Neil Williamson	The Ephemera	Elastic Press	
2007	Joel Lane	The Lost District and Other Stories	Night Shade Books	
2007	Kim Newman	The Man from the Diogenes Club	MonkeyBrain	
2007	Mike O'Driscoll	Unbecoming and Other Tales of Horror	Elastic Press	
2008	Christopher Fowler*	Old Devil Moon	Serpent's Tail	
2008	Gary McMahon	Dirty Prayers	Gray Friar Press	
2008	Tony Richards	Going Back	Elastic Press	
2008	Simon Clark	Midnight Bazaar: A Secret Arcade of Strange and Eerie Tales	Robert Hale	
2008	Stephen Gallagher	Plots and Misadventures	Subterranean Press	
2008	Paul Finch	Stains	Gray Friar Press	
2009	Allyson Bird*	Bull Running for Girls	Screaming Dreams	
2009	Mark Samuels	Glyphotech	PS Publishing	
2009	Gary McMahon	How To Make Monsters	Morrigan Books	
2009	Paul Meloy	Islington Crocodiles	TTA Press	
2009	Stephen King	Just After Sunset	Hodder & Stoughton	
2010	Robert Shearman*	Love Songs for the Shy And Cynical	Big Finish Productions	
2010	Allen Ashley	Once & Future Cities	Eibonvale	
2010	Ramsey Campbell	Just Behind You	PS Publishing	
2010	Joel Lane	The Terrible Changes	Ex Occidente	
2010	Ian McDonald	Cyberabad Days	Gollancz	
2011	Stephen King*	Full Dark, No Stars	Hodder & Stoughton	
2011	Simon Clark	The Gravedigger's Tale: Fables of Fear	Robert Hale	
2011	Tim Lebbon	Last Exit for the Lost	Cemetery Dance Publications	
2011	Paul Finch	One Monster Is Not Enough	Gray Friar Press	
2011	Paul Finch	Walkers in the Dark	Ash-Tree Press	
2012	Robert Shearman*	Everyone's Just So So Special	Big Finish Productions	
2012	Peter Atkins	Rumours of the Marvellous	Alchemy Press	
2012	Reggie Oliver	Mrs Midnight	Tartarus Press	
2012	Liz Williams	A Glass of Shadow	NewCon	
2013	Robert Shearman*	Remember Why You Fear Me	ChiZine	
2013	Jonathan Carroll	The Woman Who Married a Cloud	Subterranean Press	
2013	Joel Lane	Where Furnaces Burn	PS Publishing	
2013	Thana Niveau	From Hell to Eternity	Gray Friar Press	
2014	Stephen Volk*	Monsters in the Heart	Gray Friar Press	
2014	Nathan Ballingrud	North American Lake Monsters	Small Beer Press	
2014	Ramsey Campbell	Holes for Faces	Dark Regions Press	
2014	Anna Taborska	For Those Who Dream Monsters	Mortbury Press	
2015	Adrian Cole	Nick Nightmare Investigates	Alchemy & Airgedlámh	
2015	Hal Duncan	Scruffians! Stories of Better Sodomites	Lethe Press	
2015	Carole Johnstone	The Bright Day Is Done	Gray Friar Press	
2015	Helen Marshall	Gifts for the One Who Comes After	ChiZine	
2015	Lavie Tidhar	Black Gods Kiss	PS Publishing	
2016	Tananarive Due*	Ghost Summer: Stories	Prime Books	
2016	Ray Cluley	Probably Monsters	ChiZine	
2016	Margrét Helgadóttir	The Stars Seem So Far Away	Fox Spirit	
2016	Paul Kane	Monsters	Alchemy Press	
2016	Joel Lane	Scar City	Eibonvale	
2016	V. H. Leslie	Skein and Bone	Undertow	
2017	Adam Nevill*	Some Will Not Sleep	Ritual Limited	
2017	Stephen Volk	The Parts We Play	PS Publishing	
2017	Neil Williamson	Secret Language	NewCon	
2017	Joe Abercrombie	Sharp Ends	Gollancz	
2017	Pete Sutton	A Tiding of Magpies	Kensington Gore Hammered Horror	
2017	Tracy Fahey	The Unheimlich Menoeuvre	Boo Books	
2018	Joe Hill*	Strange Weather	Gollancz	
2018	Neil Gaiman	Norse Mythology	Bloomsbury Publishing	
2018	Tanith Lee	Tanith by Choice	NewCon	
2018	Sofia Samatar	Tender: Stories	Small Beer Press	
2018	Malcolm Devlin	You Will Grow into Them	Unsung Stories	
2019	Priya Sharma*	All the Fabulous Beasts	Undertow	
2019	Catherynne M. Valente	The Future is Blue	Subterranean Press	
2019	N. K. Jemisin	How Long 'til Black Future Month?	Orbit Books	
2019	Marian Womack	Lost Objects	Luna Press	
2019	Thana Niveau	Octoberland	PS Publishing	
2019	Rosanne Rabinowitz	Resonance & Revolt	Eibonvale	
2020	Laura Mauro*	Sing Your Sadness Deep	Undertow	
2020	Maura McHugh	The Boughs Withered When I Told Them My Dreams	NewCon	
2020	Paul G. Tremblay	Growing Things	Titan Books	
2020	Georgina Bruce	This House of Wounds	Undertow	
2020	Aliette de Bodard	Of Wars, And Memories, And Starlight	Subterranean Press	
2021	Charlotte Bond*	The Watcher in the Woods	Black Shuck Books	
2021	Anna Taborska	Bloody Britain	Shadow	
2021	Dan Coxon	Only the Broken Remain	Black Shuck Books	
2021	Robert Shearman	We All Hear Stories in the Dark	PS Publishing	
2022	Isabel Yap*	Never Have I Ever	Small Beer Press	
2022	A. C. Wise	The Ghost Sequences	Undertow	
2022	Tracy Fahey	I Spit Myself Out	Sinister Horror Company	
2022	Pete W. Sutton	The Museum for Forgetting	Grimbold	
2022	C. A. Yates	We All Have Teeth	Fox Spirit	
2023	E. M. Faulds*	Under the Moon	Ghost Moth	
2023	Penny Jones	Behind a Broken Smile	Black Shuck Books	
2023	Cassandra Khaw	Breakable Things	Undertow	
2023	Andrew Hook	Candescent Blooms	Salt	
2024	Tobi Ogundiran*	Jackal, Jackal: Tales of the Dark and Fantastic	Undertow	
2024	Alison Littlewood	A Curious Cartography	Black Shuck Books	
2024	Phil Sloman	No Happily Ever After	Self-published	
2024	Premee Mohamed	No One Will Come Back for Us	Undertow	
2024	Georgina Bruce	The House on the Moon	Black Shuck Books	
2024	K. J. Parker	Under my Skin	Subterranean Press	
2025	Cecile Cristofari*	Elephants in Bloom	NewCon	
2025	Steve Toase	Dirt Upon My Skin	Black Shuck Books	
2025	Lyndsey Croal	Limelight and Other Stories	Shortwave Publishing	
2025	Dave Jeffery	Mood Swings	Black Shuck Books	
2025	James Bennett	Preaching To The Perverted	Lethe Press	
2026	Christopher Caldwell*	Call And Response	Neon Hemlock Press	
2026	Lyndsey Croal	Dark Crescent	Luna Press	
2026	Joyce Chng	Wolf's Path	Atthis Arts	
2026	Gareth L. Powell	Who Will You Save	Titan Books	
2026	Benjamin Kurt Unsworth	Into Wrack and Ruin	Phantasmagoria Books	
