= Bram Stoker Award for Best Fiction Collection =

The Bram Stoker Award for Best Fiction Collection is an award presented by the Horror Writers Association (HWA). It is given for "superior achievement" in horror writing for best fiction collection.

== Winners and nominees ==
This category was previously titled "best collection". Nominees are listed below the winner(s) for each year.

Bram Stoker Award for Best Fiction Collection winners and nominees
Year Published	Recipient	Nominated work	Result	Ref
1987	Harlan Ellison	The Essential Ellison	Won	
1987	Robert Bloch	Midnight Pleasures	Nominated	
1987	Ramsey Campbell	Scared Stiff	Nominated	
1987	Karl Edward Wagner	Why Not You and I?	Nominated	
1987	Howard Waldrop	All About Strange Monsters of the Recent Past	Nominated	
1988	Charles Beaumont	Charles Beaumont: Selected Stories	Won	
1988	Ray Bradbury	The Toynbee Convector	Nominated	
1988	Harlan Ellison	Angry Candy	Nominated	
1988	Dennis Etchison	The Blood Kiss	Nominated	
1988	John Farris	Scare Tactics	Nominated	
1988	Patrick McGrath	Blood and Water and Other Tales		
1989	Richard Matheson	Richard Matheson: Collected Stories	Won	
1989	Pat Cadigan	Patterns	Nominated	
1989	Joe R. Lansdale	By Bizarre Hands	Nominated	
1989	Robert R. McCammon	Blue World	Nominated	
1989	F. Paul Wilson	Soft and Others	Nominated	
1990	Stephen King	Four Past Midnight	Won	
1990	Michael Blumlein	The Brains of Rats	Nominated	
1990	Dan Simmons	Prayers To Broken Stones	Nominated	
1990	Peter Straub	Houses Without Doors	Nominated	
1991	Dan Simmons	Prayers to Broken Stones	Won	
1991	Ramsey Campbell	Waking Nightmares	Nominated	
1991	Richard Stuphin	Sex Punks & Savage Sagas	Nominated	
1991	J. N. Williamson	Naked Flesh of Feeling	Nominated	
1992	Norman Partridge	Mr. Fox and Other Feral Tales	Won	
1992	Elizabeth Engstrom	Nightmare Flower	Nominated	
1992	I. U. Tarchetti	Fantastic Tales	Nominated	
1993	Ramsey Campbell	Alone With The Horrors	Won	
1993	Stephen King	Nightmares & Dreamscapes	Nominated	
1993	Richard Laymon	A Good and Secret Place	Nominated	
1993	Dan Simmons	Lovedeath	Nominated	
1993	Lucy Taylor	Close to the Bone	Nominated	
1994	Robert Bloch	The Early Fears	Won	
1994	Joe R. Lansdale	Writer of the Purple Rage	Nominated	
1994	Lucy Taylor	The Flesh Artist	Nominated	
1994	Andrew Vachss	Born Bad	Nominated	
1995	Jonathan Carroll	The Panic Hand	Won	
1995	Ed Gorman	Cages	Nominated	
1995	Charles L. Grant	The Black Carousel	Nominated	
1995	Dean Koontz	Strange Highways	Nominated	
1996	Thomas Ligotti	The Nightmare Factory	Won	
1996	Brian Hodge	The Convulsion Factory	Nominated	
1996	Elizabeth Massie	Shadow Dreams	Nominated	
1996	Wayne Allen Sallee	With Wounds Still Wet	Nominated	
1996	S. P. Somtow	The Pavilion of Frozen Women	Nominated	
1997	Karl Edward Wagner	Exorcisms and Ecstasies	Won	
1997	Gary A. Braunbeck	Things Left Behind	Nominated	
1997	Brian McNaughton	The Throne of Bones	Nominated	
1997	Lucy Taylor	Painted in Blood	Nominated	
1998	John Shirley	Black Butterflies	Won	
1998	P. D. Cacek	Leavings	Nominated	
1998	Neil Gaiman	Smoke and Mirrors	Nominated	
1998	Gahan Wilson	The Cleft and Other Odd Tales	Nominated	
1999	Douglas Clegg	The Nightmare Chronicles	Won	
1999	Edo van Belkom	Death Drives a Semi	Nominated	
1999	Stephen King	Hearts in Atlantis	Nominated	
1999	Tom Piccirilli	Deep into that Darkness Peering	Nominated	
2000	Peter Straub	Magic Terror	Won	
2000	Charlee Jacob	Up, Out of Cities That Blow Hot and Cold	Nominated	
2000	Bruce Holland Rogers	Wind Over Heaven and Other Dark Tales	Nominated	
2000	Steve Rasnic Tem	City Fishing	Nominated	
2001	Norman Partridge	The Man with the Barbed-Wire Fists	Won	
2001	Ed Gorman	The Dark Fantastic	Nominated	
2001	Tim Lebbon	As the Sun Goes Down	Nominated	
2001	Brian Lumley	The Whisperer and Other Voices	Nominated	
2002	Ray Bradbury	One More for the Road	Won	
2002	Mort Castle	Nations of the Living, Nations of the Dead	Nominated	
2002	Nancy A. Collins	Knuckles and Tales	Nominated	
2002	Stephen King	Everything's Eventual	Nominated	
2002	Bentley Little	The Collection	Nominated	
2003	Jack Ketchum	Peaceable Kingdom	Won	
2003	Gary A. Braunbeck	Graveyard People: The Collected Cedar Hill Stories Vol 1	Nominated	
2003	Ramsey Campbell	Told by the Dead	Nominated	
2003	Elizabeth Hand	Bibliomancy	Nominated	
2003	Karen E. Taylor	Fangs and Angel Wings	Nominated	
2004	Thomas F. Monteleone	Fearful Symmetries	Won	
2004	Michael Arnzen	100 Jolts: Shockingly Short Stories	Nominated	
2004	Douglas Clegg	The Machinery of Night	Nominated	
2004	Christopher Fowler	Demonized	Nominated	
2004	Tim Lebbon	Fears Unnamed	Nominated	
2005	Joe Hill	20th Century Ghosts	Won	
2005	Kelly Link	Magic for Beginners	Nominated	
2005	China Miéville	Looking for Jake	Nominated	
2005	Chuck Palahniuk	Haunted	Nominated	
2006	Gary A. Braunbeck	Destinations Unknown	Won	
2006	Terry Dowling	Basic Black: Tales of Appropriate Fear	Nominated	
2006	Jeffrey Ford	The Empire of Ice Cream	Nominated	
2006	Angeline Hawkes	The Commandments	Nominated	
2006	Glen Hirshberg	American Morons	Nominated	
2007	Michael A. Arnzen	Proverbs for Monsters	Won (Tie)	
2007	Peter Straub	5 Stories	Won (Tie)	
2007	Laird Barron	The Imago Sequence	Nominated	
2007	Christopher Fowler	Old Devil Moon	Nominated	
2007	David Niall Wilson	Defining Moments	Nominated	
2008	Stephen King	Just After Sunset	Won	
2008	Kealan Patrick Burke	The Number 121 to Pennsylvania	Nominated	
2008	Fran Friel	Mama's Boy and Other Dark Tales	Nominated	
2008	John Langan	Mr. Gaunt and Other Uneasy Encounters	Nominated	
2008	Jeff Strand	Gleefully Macabre Tales	Nominated	
2009	Gene O'Neill	A Taste of Tenderloin	Won	
2009	Robert Dunbar	Martyrs and Monsters	Nominated	
2009	Dennis Etchison	Got to Kill Them All and Other Stories	Nominated	
2009	Lee Thomas	In the Closet, Under the Bed	Nominated	
2010	Stephen King	Full Dark, No Stars	Won	
2010	Laird Barron	Occultation	Nominated	
2010	Michael Louis Calvillo	Blood and Gristle	Nominated	
2010	Stephen Graham Jones	The Ones that Got Away	Nominated	
2010	Harry Shannon	A Host of Shadows	Nominated	
2011	Joyce Carol Oates	The Corn Maiden and Other Nightmares	Won	
2011	Lawrence C. Connolly	Voices: Tales of Horror	Nominated	
2011	Christopher Fowler	Red Gloves	Nominated	
2011	Caitlin R. Kiernan	Two Worlds and In Between: The Best of Caitlin R. Kiernan (Volume One)	Nominated	
2011	Lisa Morton	Monsters of L.A.	Nominated	
2011	Weston Ochse	Multiplex Fandango	Nominated	
2012	Mort Castle	New Moon on the Water	Won (Tie)	
2012	Joyce Carol Oates	Black Dahlia and White Rose: Stories	Won (Tie)	
2012	Jonathan Carroll	Woman Who Married a Cloud: Collected Stories	Nominated	
2012	Elizabeth Hand	Errantry: Strange Stories	Nominated	
2012	Glen Hirshberg	The Janus Tree	Nominated	
2013	Laird Barron	The Beautiful Thing That Awaits Us All and Other Stories	Won	
2013	Nathan Ballingrud	North American Lake Monsters: Stories	Nominated	
2013	James Dorr	The Tears of Isis	Nominated	
2013	Caitlin R. Kiernan	The Ape’s Wife and Other Stories	Nominated	
2013	Gene O'Neill	Dance of the Blue Lady	Nominated	
2013	S. P. Somtow	Bible Stories for Secular Humanists	Nominated	
2014	Lucy A. Snyder	Soft Apocalypses	Won	
2014	Stephen Graham Jones	After the People Lights Have Gone Off	Nominated	
2014	John R. Little	Little by Little	Nominated	
2014	Helen Marshall	Gifts for the One Who Comes After	Nominated	
2014	John F. D. Taff	The End in All Beginnings	Nominated	
2015	Lucy A. Snyder	While the Black Stars Burn	Won	
2015	Gary A. Braunbeck	Halfway Down the Stairs	Nominated	
2015	Nicole Cushing	The Mirrors	Nominated	
2015	Taylor Grant	The Dark at the End of the Tunnel	Nominated	
2015	Gene O'Neill	The Hitchhiking Effect	Nominated	
2016	Joyce Carol Oates	The Doll-Master and Other Tales of Terror	Won	
2016	Laird Barron	Swift to Chase	Nominated	
2016	Richard Chizmar	A Long December	Nominated	
2016	Gene O'Neill	Lethal Birds	Nominated	
2016	Hank Schwaeble	American Nocturne	Nominated	
2017	Joe Hill	Strange Weather	Won	
2017	Gwendolyn Kiste	And Her Smile Will Untether the Universe	Nominated	
2017	Josh Malerman	Goblin	Nominated	
2017	Thersa Matsuura	The Carp-Faced Boy and Other Tales	Nominated	
2017	Patrick McGrath	Writing Madness	Nominated	
2018	Eric J. Guignard	That Which Grows Wild	Won	
2018	Gemma Files	Spectral Evidence	Nominated	
2018	Gabino Iglesias	Coyote Songs	Nominated	
2018	Lucy A. Snyder	Garden of Eldritch Delights	Nominated	
2018	Tim Waggoner	Dark and Distant Voices: A Story Collection	Nominated	
2019	Paul Tremblay	Growing Things and Other Stories	Won	
2019	Ted Chiang	Exhalation: Stories	Nominated	
2019	Kate Jonez	Lady Bits	Nominated	
2019	John Langan	Sefira and Other Betrayals	Nominated	
2019	Sarah Read	Out of Water	Nominated	
2020	Lee Murray	Grotesque: Monster Stories	Won	
2020	Kathe Koja	Velocities: Stories	Nominated	
2020	John Langan	Children of the Fang and Other Genealogies	Nominated	
2020	Patricia Lillie	The Cuckoo Girls	Nominated	
2020	Anna Taborska	Bloody Britain	Nominated	
2021	Gemma Files	In That Endlessness, Our End	Won	
2021	Philip Fracassi	Beneath a Pale Sky	Nominated	
2021	Jonathan Maberry	Empty Graves: Tales of the Living Dead	Nominated	
2021	Lisa Tuttle	The Dead Hours of Night	Nominated	
2021	A. C. Wise	The Ghost Sequences	Nominated	
2022	Cassandra Khaw	Breakable Things	Won	
2022	Paula D. Ashe	We Are Here to Hurt Each Other	Nominated	
2022	RJ Joseph	Hell Hath No Sorrow Like a Woman Haunted	Nominated	
2022	Richard Thomas	Spontaneous Human Combustion	Nominated	
2022	Attila Veres	The Black Maybe	Nominated	
2023
2023	Gemma Files	Blood from the Air	Won	
2023	Todd Keisling	Cold, Black, & Infinite	Nominated	
2023	Josh Malerman	Spin a Black Yarn	Nominated	
2023	Christi Nogle	The Best of Our Past, the Worst of Our Future	Nominated	
2023	Sarah Read	Root Rot & Other Grim Tales	Nominated	
2024
2024	Mercedes M. Yardley	Love is a Crematorium and Other Tales	Won	
2024	Laird Barron	Not a Speck of Light	Nominated	
2024	Mariana Enriquez	A Sunny Place for Shady People	Nominated	
2024	Angela Sylvaine	The Dead Spot: Stories of Lost Girls	Nominated	
2024	Tim Waggoner	Old Monsters Never Die	Nominated	
2025	John Langan	Lost in The Dark and Other Excursions	Won	
2025	Clay McLeod Chapman	Acquired Taste	Nominated	
2025	Gemma Files	Little Horn: Stories	Nominated	
2025	Hailey Piper	Teenage Girls Can Be Demons	Nominated	
2025	Sara Tantlinger	Cyanide Constellations	Nominated	
