= Modern Fantasy: The 100 Best Novels =

1988 book by David Pringle

Modern Fantasy: The 100 Best Novels, An English-Language Selection, 1946–1987
- Author: David Pringle
- Language: English
- Genre: Non-fiction
- Publisher: Grafton Books
- Publication date: 1988
- Publication place: United Kingdom
- ISBN: 0-246-13214-0

Modern Fantasy: The 100 Best Novels, An English-Language Selection, 1946–1987 is a nonfiction book written by David Pringle, published by Grafton Books in 1988 in the United Kingdom and the following year by Peter Bedrick Books in the United States. The foreword is by Brian W. Aldiss.

Primarily the book comprises 100 short essays on the selected works, covered in order of publication, without any ranking. It is considered an important critical summary of the field of modern fantasy literature.

Modern Fantasy followed Pringle's Science Fiction: The 100 Best Novels, published by Xanadu in 1985. In the introduction he commends the nearly simultaneous "rival" followup by Xanadu: Stephen Jones and Kim Newman's Horror: The 100 Best Books (Xanadu, 1988).

In fact Xanadu had followed with at least three more books in its 100 Best series: Crime and Mystery in 1987, both Horror and Fantasy in 1988.

According to ISFDB, Pringle's Modern Fantasy was released in October 1988, September 1989 in the U.S.; Xanadu's Fantasy was released in November and published almost simultaneously by Carroll and Graf in the U.S.

== The List ==
1. Titus Groan by Mervyn Peake (1946)
2. The Book of Ptath by A. E. Van Vogt (1947)
3. The Well of the Unicorn by Fletcher Pratt (1948)
4. Darker Than You Think by Jack Williamson (1948)
5. Seven Days in New Crete by Robert Graves (1949)
6. Silverlock by John Myers Myers (1949)
7. The Castle of Iron by L. Sprague de Camp and Fletcher Pratt (1950)
8. Conan the Conqueror by Robert E. Howard (1950)
9. The Lion, the Witch and the Wardrobe by C. S. Lewis (1950)
10. Gormenghast by Mervyn Peake (1950)
11. The Dying Earth by Jack Vance (1950)
12. The Sound of His Horn by Sarban (1952)
13. Conjure Wife by Fritz Leiber (1953)
14. The Sinful Ones by Fritz Leiber (1953)
15. The Broken Sword by Poul Anderson (1954)
16. The Lord of the Rings by J. R. R. Tolkien (1954–55)
17. Pincher Martin by William Golding (1956)
18. The Shrinking Man by Richard Matheson (1956)
19. Dandelion Wine by Ray Bradbury (1957)
20. The Once and Future King by T. H. White (1958)
21. The Unpleasant Profession of Jonathan Hoag by Robert A. Heinlein (1959)
22. The Haunting of Hill House by Shirley Jackson (1959)
23. Titus Alone by Mervyn Peake (1959)
24. A Fine and Private Place by Peter S. Beagle (1960)
25. Three Hearts and Three Lions by Poul Anderson (1961)
26. The Girl, the Gold Watch & Everything by John D. MacDonald (1962)
27. Glory Road by Robert A. Heinlein (1963)
28. Witch World by Andre Norton (1963)
29. The Magus by John Fowles (1965)
30. Stormbringer by Michael Moorcock (1984)
31. The Crying of Lot 49 by Thomas Pynchon (1966)
32. Day of the Minotaur by Thomas Burnett Swann (1966)
33. The Eyes of the Overworld by Jack Vance (1966)
34. The Owl Service by Alan Garner (1967)
35. Rosemary's Baby by Ira Levin (1967)
36. The Third Policeman by Flann O'Brien (1967)
37. Gog by Andrew Sinclair (1967)
38. The Last Unicorn by Peter S. Beagle (1968)
39. A Wizard of Earthsea by Ursula K. Le Guin (1968)
40. The Swords of Lankhmar by Fritz Leiber (1968)
41. Black Easter by James Blish (1968)
42. The Green Man by Kingsley Amis (1969)
43. The Phoenix and the Mirror by Avram Davidson (1969)
44. A Feast Unknown by Philip José Farmer (1969)
45. Fourth Mansions by R. A. Lafferty (1969)
46. Red Moon and Black Mountain by Joy Chant (1970)
47. Time and Again by Jack Finney (1970)
48. Grendel by John Gardner (1971)
49. Briefing for a Descent into Hell by Doris Lessing (1971)
50. Jack of Shadows by Roger Zelazny (1971)
51. Watership Down by Richard Adams (1972)
52. The Infernal Desire Machines of Doctor Hoffman by Angela Carter (1972)
53. Sweet Dreams by Michael Frayn (1973)
54. The Forgotten Beasts of Eld by Patricia A. McKillip (1974)
55. 'Salem's Lot by Stephen King (1975)
56. The Great Victorian Collection by Brian Moore (1975)
57. Grimus by Salman Rushdie (1975)
58. Peace by Gene Wolfe (1975)
59. The Malacia Tapestry by Brian Aldiss (1976)
60. The Dragon and the George by Gordon R. Dickson (1976)
61. Hotel de Dream by Emma Tennant (1976)
62. The Passion of New Eve by Angela Carter (1977)
63. Lord Foul's Bane by Stephen R. Donaldson (1977)
64. The Shining by Stephen King (1977)
65. Fata Morgana by William Kotzwinkle (1977)
66. Our Lady of Darkness by Fritz Leiber (1977)
67. Gloriana by Michael Moorcock (1978)
68. The Unlimited Dream Company by J. G. Ballard (1979)
69. Sorcerer's Son by Phyllis Eisenstein (1979)
70. The Land of Laughs by Jonathan Carroll (1980)
71. The Vampire Tapestry by Suzy McKee Charnas (1980)
72. A Storm of Wings by M. John Harrison (1980)
73. White Light by Rudy Rucker (1980)
74. Ariosto by Chelsea Quinn Yarbro (1980)
75. Cities of the Red Night by William S. Burroughs (1981)
76. Little, Big by John Crowley (1981)
77. Lanark by Alasdair Gray (1981)
78. The War Hound and the World's Pain by Michael Moorcock (1981)
79. Nifft the Lean by Michael Shea (1982)
80. Winter's Tale by Mark Helprin (1983)
81. Soul Eater by K. W. Jeter (1983)
82. Tea with the Black Dragon by R. A. MacAvoy (1983)
83. Cold Heaven by Brian Moore (1983)
84. The Anubis Gates by Tim Powers (1983)
85. Who Made Stevie Crye? by Michael Bishop (1984)
86. The Digging Leviathan by James Blaylock (1984)
87. Nights at the Circus by Angela Carter (1984)
88. The Businessman by Thomas M. Disch (1984)
89. Mythago Wood by Robert Holdstock (1984)
90. The Glamour by Christopher Priest (1984)
91. The Witches of Eastwick by John Updike (1984)
92. Hawksmoor by Peter Ackroyd (1985)
93. The Dream Years by Lisa Goldstein (1985)
94. The Fionavar Tapestry by Guy Gavriel Kay (1985–87)
95. The Bridge by Iain Banks (1986)
96. The Hungry Moon by Ramsey Campbell (1986)
97. Replay by Ken Grimwood (1987)
98. The Unconquered Country by Geoff Ryman (1986)
99. The Day of Creation by J. G. Ballard (1987)
100. Ægypt by John Crowley (1987)

== Scope ==
Pringle says in the introduction, rebutting one academic complaint about the sprawling scope of fantasy, "But it seems to me that fantasy is an indiscriminate form. ... We may even view it as the primal genre, essentially formless, a swamp which has served as the breeding ground for all other popular fiction genres ... Up to the eighteenth century, almost all narrative fictions, both verse and prose, were fantastic to a greater or lesser degree."

In the introduction to the earlier book, he had distinguished "supernatural horror" and "heroic fantasy" as the other important divisions of fantastic fiction beside science fiction. They may be represented by Dracula and The Lord of the Rings, featuring "the irruption of some supernatural force into the everyday world" and "set in completely imaginary worlds" respectively. Here he adds "the Fabulation, or absurdist metafiction—stories which are set in the real world, but which distort that world in ways other than the supernaturally horrific." He names Thomas Pynchon, Angela Carter, John Crowley, and Geoff Ryman as authors of fabulations included in his hundred.

While covering no foreign-language fantasies and few children's or 'light' fantasies, "I have tried to make a balanced list, and in so doing I have included some books which are not really to my taste—they may well be other people's favourites, though. In truth, there are not a hundred masterpieces of modern fantasy, any more than there a hundred masterpieces of science fiction." "[A]t least some of the novels I have selected are masterpieces of modern literature, full of beauty and wonder. The others are craftsmanlike entertainments which I happily commend to you for your enjoyment."

== Sources ==
- Modern Fantasy: The 100 Best Novels, An English-Language Selection, 1946–1987, David Pringle. (UK) Grafton Books, 1988 ISBN 0-246-13214-0 ; (US) Peter Bedrick Books, 1989 ISBN 0-87226-328-2 —US title "the Hundred Best"
