= Eddie Jones (artist) =

Edward John Jones
- Eddie Jones at the 1965 London WorldCon
- Born: January 18, 1935; Bootle, Lancashire, United Kingdom
- Died: October 15, 1999 (aged 64); Liverpool, United Kingdom
- Occupation: Science fiction illustrator
- Years active: 1953–1985
- Notable work: Cover art for Ringworld, World of Ptavvs, The Stainless Steel Rat
- Awards: Nominated for Hugo Award for Best Professional Artist (1970, 1971)

Edward John Jones (18 January 1935 – 15 October 1999) was a British science fiction illustrator; initially known as a fan artist, he later became a professional freelancer. He illustrated numerous science fiction book and magazine covers, some under the pseudonym S. Fantoni, and provided interior illustrations for books and magazines. Jones was active in the field from 1953 to 1985, and reprints of his artwork continued to appear on book covers until his death in 1999.

== Career ==
Eddie Jones was born 18 January 1935 in Bootle, Lancashire, in the United Kingdom.

In 1969, he became the art editor for Vision of Tomorrow, a short-lived British SF magazine. Although probably best known for his Star Trek covers for Bantam Books and almost fifty covers for Sphere Books, much of his output was for German publishers, including more than 100 covers for Bastei Lübbe's science fiction imprint and over 500 for Terra Astra magazine.

The Science Fiction Writers of America described Jones as "the precursor to a generation of artists that helped define the look of early '70s SF illustration". He was nominated for a Hugo Award for Best Professional Artist in 1970 and 1971. In Larry Niven's short story "Singularities Make Me Nervous", from Convergent Series, the protagonist, speaking in the future, describes his apartment as containing "Eddie Jones originals".

He died in Liverpool on 15 October 1999.

== Partial bibliography ==
All entries are for cover illustrations of UK editions, unless otherwise indicated

- World of Ptavvs, Larry Niven, Sphere, 1971, ISBN 0-7221-6387-8
- Ringworld, Larry Niven, Sphere, 1973, ISBN 0-7221-6391-6
- Rite of Passage, Alexei Panshin, Sphere, 1973, ISBN 0-7221-6685-0
- Demons by Daylight, Ramsey Campbell, Arkham House, 1973
- Inconstant Moon, Larry Niven, Sphere, 1974, ISBN 0-7221-6383-5
- Star Trek 10, James Blish, 1974 (US edition) (as S. Fantoni)
- Star Trek 11, James Blish, 1975 (US edition) (as S. Fantoni)
- The Stainless Steel Rat, Harry Harrison, Sphere, 1976, ISBN 0-7221-4409-1
- Hothouse, Brian W. Aldiss, Sphere, 1976, ISBN 0-7221-1075-8
- Star Trek 12, James Blish, 1977, ISBN 0-553-11382-8 (US edition) (as S. Fantoni)
- World Without End, Joe Haldeman, Bantam Books, 1979, ISBN 0-553-12583-4 (first US edition cover)
