= Alone with the Horrors: The Great Short Fiction of Ramsey Campbell 1961–1991 =

1993 collection of fantasy and horror stories by Ramsey Campbell

Alone with the Horrors: The Great Short Fiction of Ramsey Campbell 1961-1991
- Dust-jacket illustration by Jeffrey K. Potter.
- Author: Ramsey Campbell
- Illustrator: Jeffrey K. Potter
- Cover artist: Jeffrey K. Potter
- Language: English
- Genre: Horror, fantasy
- Publisher: Arkham House
- Publication date: 1993
- Publication place: United States
- Media type: Print (hardback)
- Pages: xi, 515 pp
- ISBN: 0-87054-165-X
- OCLC: 26304271
- Dewey Decimal: 823/.914 20
- LC Class: PR6053.A4855 A6 1993

Alone with the Horrors: The Great Short Fiction of Ramsey Campbell 1961–1991 is a collection of fantasy and horror stories by British author Ramsey Campbell. Released in 1993 in an edition of 3,834 copies, it was the author's fourth collection of stories to be published by Arkham House. The contents consist of 39 of Campbell's previously uncollected tales along with a selection of works drawn from each of Campbell's Arkham collections as well as the mass-market collections Dark Companions (1982), Scared Stiff (1986) and Waking Nightmares (1991).

A mass-market edition was issued by Tor Books in 2005. It has a different introduction, and "The Room in the Castle" was replaced with "The Tower from Yuggoth", a first-draft (but published) version of "The Mine on Yuggoth", which appeared in The Inhabitant of the Lake and Less Welcome Tenants. The Tor edition also omits "Stages" and "Loveman's Comeback" from the Arkham House edition, for a total of 37 stories rather than 39.

== Contents ==
Alone with the Horrors (Arkham House edition) contains the following stories:

- "So Far" (introduction)
- "The Room in the Castle"
- "Cold Print"
- "The Scar"
- "The Interloper"
- "The Guy"
- "The End of a Summer's Day"
- "The Man in the Underpass"
- "The Companion"
- "Call First"
- "Heading Home"
- "In the Bag"
- "Baby"
- "The Chimney"
- "Stages"
- "The Brood"
- "Loveman's Comeback"
- "The Gap"
- "The Voice of the Beach"
- "Out of Copyright"
- "Above the World"
- "Mackintosh Willy"
- "The Show Goes On"
- "The Ferries"
- "Midnight Hobo"
- "The Depths"
- "Down There"
- "The Fit"
- "Hearing is Believing"
- "The Hands"
- "Again"
- "Just Waiting"
- "Seeing the World"
- "Old Clothes"
- "Apples"
- "The Other Side"
- "Where the Heart Is"
- "Boiled Alive"
- "Another World"
- "End of the Line"

== Awards ==
- World Fantasy Award - 1994

== Sources ==
- Chalker, Jack L.; Mark Owings (1998). The Science-Fantasy Publishers: A Bibliographic History, 1923-1998. Westminster, MD and Baltimore: Mirage Press, Ltd. p. 59.
- Joshi, S.T. (1999). Sixty Years of Arkham House: A History and Bibliography. Sauk City, WI: Arkham House. pp. 164–165. ISBN 0-87054-176-5.
- Nielsen, Leon (2004). Arkham House Books: A Collector's Guide. Jefferson, NC and London: McFarland & Company, Inc. pp. 138–139. ISBN 0-7864-1785-4.
