= Demons by Daylight =

1973 story collection by Ramsey Campbell

- Dust-jacket illustration by Eddie Jones.
- Author: Ramsey Campbell
- Cover artist: Eddie Jones
- Language: English
- Genre: Fantasy, horror
- Publisher: Arkham House
- Publication date: 1973
- Publication place: United States
- Media type: Print (hardback)
- Pages: 153

Demons by Daylight is a collection of stories by English author Ramsey Campbell. Initially announced under the title Gardens of Night, it was released in 1973. It was the author's second short story collection, after The Inhabitant of the Lake and Less Welcome Tenants in 1964. Like the earlier book, it was published by Arkham House.

According to Campbell, he actually began writing Demons by Daylight not long after The Inhabitant of the Lake and Less Welcome Tenants, but it took five years for him to write, due to his being so dissatisfied with the first drafts of the stories that he discarded them entirely. Campbell had completed work on the stories for it by 1968, and it was scheduled for publication in 1971. However, due to the 1971 death of editor and Arkham House co-founder August Derleth, the collection was delayed two years. It finally saw print in 1973, in an edition totaling 3,472 copies and with dust jacket art by Eddie Jones, commissioned by Campbell.

A variant edition was published by Jove/HBJ in May 1979. In the section 'Relationships', this edition omits "The Second Staircase" and adds "Reply Guaranteed" and "The Telephones".

The 1990 Carroll & Graf paperback reproduces the contents of the original Arkham House edition.

== Contents ==
Demons by Daylight contains the following stories, grouped into three sections:

1. Nightmares
  - "Potential"
  - "The End of a Summer's Day"
  - "At First Sight"
2. Errol Undercliffe: a tribute
  - "The Franklyn Paragraphs"
  - "The Interloper" (as by Errol Undercliffe)
3. Relationships
  - "The Sentinels"
  - "The Guy"
  - "The Old Horns"
  - "The Lost"
  - "The Stocking"
  - "The Second Staircase"
  - "Concussion"
  - "The Enchanted Fruit"
  - "Made in Goatswood"

== Critical response ==
Campbell has acknowledged that the stories in the book were written primarily under the stylistic influence of Vladimir Nabokov. Campbell was attempting to move away from his dependence on the influence of H.P. Lovecraft, and the style of these stories is radically different from the Cthulhu Mythos tales found in his first collection.

The book's first appearance induced T. E. D. Klein to write an extensive and highly positive review, "Ramsey Campbell: An Appreciation" in Nyctalops magazine and critic S. T. Joshi has stated that:

its ... allusiveness of narration; careful, at times even obsessive focusing on the fleeting sensations and psychological processes of characters; an aggressively modern setting that allows commentary on social, cultural and political issues - all conjoin to make Demons by Daylight perhaps the most important book of horror fiction since Lovecraft's The Outsider and Others.

Campbell said that Klein's review encouraged him to become a full-time writer, explaining, "Everything I wanted to be in the book was there in his account, so clearly I was communicating with somebody." [emphasis in original]

== Sources ==
- Jaffery, Sheldon (1989). The Arkham House Companion. Mercer Island, WA: Starmont House, Inc. pp. 104–105. ISBN 1-55742-005-X.
- Chalker, Jack L.; Mark Owings (1998). The Science-Fantasy Publishers: A Bibliographic History, 1923-1998. Westminster, MD and Baltimore: Mirage Press, Ltd. p. 50.
- Joshi, S.T. (1999). Sixty Years of Arkham House: A History and Bibliography. Sauk City, WI: Arkham House. pp. 130–131. ISBN 0-87054-176-5.
- Nielsen, Leon (2004). Arkham House Books: A Collector's Guide. Jefferson, NC and London: McFarland & Company, Inc. p. 117. ISBN 0-7864-1785-4.
