= Scared Stiff =

Scared Stiff may refer to:

- Scared Stiff (1945 film), a comedy directed by Frank McDonald
- Scared Stiff (1953 film), a haunted house comedy starring Dean Martin and Jerry Lewis
- Scared Stiff (1987 film), a Hong Kong film starring Chow Yun-fat
- Scared Stiff, a 1987 American horror movie directed by Richard Friedman
- Scared Stiff (pinball), a game featuring horror show-hostess Elvira
- Scared Stiff: Tales of Sex and Death, a collection of horror stories by Ramsey Campbell
- Scared Stiff, a 1991 children's book by Willo Davis Roberts

== See also ==
- Scared Straight (disambiguation)
