= The Hungry Moon =

1986 novel by Ramsey Campbell

- Author: Ramsey Campbell
- Genre: Horror fiction, Fantasy
- Publisher: Macmillan
- Publication date: 1986

The Hungry Moon is a novel by Ramsey Campbell published in 1986.

== Plot summary ==
The Hungry Moon is a novel in which a village in a moorland has fallen under the control of authoritarian fundamentalists.

== Reception ==
Dave Langford reviewed The Hungry Moon for White Dwarf #87, and stated that "Definitely a book to make you draw the curtains and turn up the central heating."

== Reviews ==
- Review by Fritz Leiber (1986) in Locus, #306 July 1986
- Review by Rob Latham (1986) in Fantasy Review, July-August 1986
- Review by Stefan Dziemianowicz (1986) in Crypt of Cthulhu, #42 Michaelmas 1986
- Review by Jonathan White (1986) in Rod Serling's The Twilight Zone Magazine, October 1986
- Review by Charles L. Grant (1986) in American Fantasy, Fall 1986
- Review by David Pringle (1988) in Modern Fantasy: The Hundred Best Novels
