= Strange Things and Stranger Places =

First edition

Strange Things and Stranger Places is a collection of horror stories by Ramsey Campbell, first published by Tor Books in 1993. The book includes two lengthy novellas, "Medusa" and "Needing Ghosts", and an introduction by the author.

Of the collection, Kirkus Reviews noted that "Campbell writes elegant, soul-sucking horror that rivals the genre's finest--but there's none of his best here...only die-hard fans will want to bother with these scrappy leavings." Publishers Weekly mirrored the assessment: "The previously published stories in this collection, which also includes a new novella, seem to have languished in obscurity until now for a reason: very few stand out, and none achieve the resonance of Campbell's best horror novels..."

== Contents ==
The book contains the following stories:

- "Cat and Mouse" (1972)
- "Medusa" (1987)
- "Rising Generation" (1975)
- "Run Through" (1975)
- "Wrapped Up" (1981)
- "Passing Phase" (1985)
- "A New Life" (1987)
- "The Next Sideshow" (1981)
- "Little Man" (1986)
- "Needing Ghosts" (1990)
