= Ghosts and Grisly Things =

Collection of short stories by Ramsey Campbell

- First edition cover
- Author: Ramsey Campbell
- Publisher: Pumpkin Books
- Publication date: 1998
- ISBN: 978-1-901-91408-5

Ghosts and Grisly Things is a collection of horror stories by English writer Ramsey Campbell, first published by Pumpkin Books in 1998. It contains an introduction by the author.

== Contents ==
The book contains the following stories:

- "The Same in Any Language" (1991)
- "Going Under" (1995)
- "The Alternative" (1994)
- "Out of the Woods" (1996)
- "A Street Was Chosen" (1991)
- "McGonagall in the Head" (1992)
- "Through the Walls" (1985)
- "This Time" (1986)
- "The Sneering" (1985)
- "Between the Floors" (1997)
- "Where They Lived" (1994)
- "Root Cause" (1986)
- "Looking Out" (1986)
- "The Dead Must Die" (1992)
- "A Side of the Sea" (1994)
- "Missed Connection" (1976)
- "The Change" (1980)
- "Welcomeland" (1988)
- "See How They Run" (1993)
- "Ra*e" (1998)
