= The Gruesome Book =

1983 novel anthology by Ramsey Campbell

The Gruesome Book is a novel anthology edited by Ramsey Campbell published in 1983.

== Plot summary ==
The Gruesome Book is a collection of nine stories for children.

== Reception ==
Dave Langford reviewed The Gruesome Book for White Dwarf #42, and stated that "To dismiss all children's titles as immature or 'just for kids' is to be in danger of missing good books."

== Reviews ==
- Review by Karl Edward Wagner (1983) in Rod Serling's The Twilight Zone Magazine, November-December 1983
