= Second Name =

- Film Poster
- Directed by: Paco Plaza
- Screenplay by: Fernando Marías; Paco Plaza
- Based on: Pact of the Fathers by Ramsey Campbell
- Produced by: Julio Fernández
- Starring: Erica Prior; Denis Rafter; Craig Stevenson; John O'Toole
- Cinematography: Pablo Rosso
- Edited by: José Ramón Lorenzo Picado
- Music by: Mikel Salas
- Production companies: Castelao Productions; Just Films
- Distributed by: Filmax
- Release dates: October 2002 (Sitges); 15 November 2002 (Spain)
- Running time: 93 minutes
- Country: Spain
- Language: English

Second Name (Spanish: El segundo nombre) is a 2002 Spanish horror film directed by Paco Plaza. Based on the 2001 horror novel Pact of the Fathers by Ramsey Campbell, the English-language film was Plaza's directorial fiction feature debut. It follows a woman's (Erica Prior) investigation of her father's suicide, leading to a cult who sacrifice their firstborn offspring.

== Plot ==
Daniella investigates her family's past in the wake of the suicide of her father. The plot gets to involves a sect called the Abrahamites, who sacrifice their first borns following an alternative interpretation of God's Will in the near-sacrifice of Isaac.

== Cast ==
- Erica Prior as Daniella
- Denis Rafter as Simon Hastings
- Craig Stevenson as Toby Harris
- John O'Toole as Father Elias
- Teresa Gimpera as Nana

== Release ==
The film screened at the Sitges Film Festival. Distributed by Filmax, the film was released theatrically in Spain on 15 November 2002.

== Reception ==
Jonathan Holland of Variety wrote that "the somber, graceful chiller" film "is better plotted than played".

== Awards and nominations ==
Cinénygma - Luxembourg International Film Festival

- 2003: Nominated, "Grand Prize of European Fantasy Film in Gold"

Fantasporto

- 2003: Nominated, "Best Film"

Sitges Film Festival

- 2002: Won, "Grand Prize of European Fantasy Film in Silver"
- 2002: Nominated, "Best Film"

Turia Awards

- 2003: Won, "Best First Work" - Paco Plaza

== See also ==
- List of Spanish films of 2002
