= The Sound of His Horn =

1952 novel by John William Wall

- First edition cover
- Author: Sarban
- Language: English
- Publisher: Peter Davies Ltd
- Publication date: 1952
- Publication place: United Kingdom
- Media type: Print (hardcover, paperback)
- Pages: 154 pp

The Sound of His Horn is a 1952 dystopian time travel/alternative history novel by the senior British diplomat John William Wall, written under the pseudonym Sarban. The novel has been included in several lists of the greatest fantasy novels of all time.

== Plot ==
Royal Navy Lieutenant Alan Querdillon becomes a German prisoner during the Battle of Crete during World War II. After escaping and travelling through a forest, he runs into a barrier of 'Bohlen Rays', is knocked unconscious, and awakens in a Nazi-controlled world at least a hundred years after World War II on the estate of the Reich Master Forester, Count Hans von Hackelnberg.

Querdillon is treated by a doctor and, at night, hears the sounds of a hunting horn, which a nurse tells him is the Count hunting. After witnessing a hunt and discovering that the prey are women dressed as birds, Querdillon asks to meet the Count. The doctor says that is too dangerous, but takes Querdillon to observe the Count feasting.

Querdillon manages to escape the doctor and join the Count's entourage to witness genetically modified leopard-women attacking deer. On the way back from the sport, the Count spots Querdillon and orders him released into the forest to be hunted. Querdillon plans to escape by tunnelling under the barrier that surrounds the estate. He also meets one of the bird-women, Kit, who helps him.

Eventually, Querdillon and Kit are hunted down by the Count, but Kit sacrifices herself to draw the leopard-woman pack onto the barrier, killing them. When the barrier is turned off to retrieve the bodies, Querdillon slips across and returns to 1943.

== Title ==
The book's title is from an 18th-century song about the "gentleman farmer" John Peel, a famous fox hunter in his time. In the novel, the title is given a sinister meaning that does not appear in the original, with the victorious Nazis hunting humans as if they were foxes. In his introduction to the 1960 edition of the novel by Ballantine Books, Kingsley Amis wrote, "I shall always feel a slight twinge whenever I am reminded of the innocent English hunting song from which the title is taken".

== Reception ==
The novel received mixed reviews upon its release. Writing for The Magazine of Fantasy & Science Fiction, author Damon Knight commented that the book was "a minor thing, crude in places, but persuasive." However, the novel has since gained a reputation as a classic of the genre. Literary critic Peter Nicholls has described it as "a fine story, well-told in a clear, evocative, almost formal prose." Thomas M. Disch ranked The Sound of His Horn at number twelve in his list of the all-time greatest fantasy stories. The book was also included by David Pringle in his book Modern Fantasy: The 100 Best Novels and by Stephen Jones and Kim Newman in their Horror: 100 Best Books.

== See also ==
- 1952 in science fiction
- Axis victory in World War II
- Human hunting
