= Convergent Series (short story collection) =

Collection of short stories by Larry Niven

- Cover of the first edition.
- Author: Larry Niven
- Cover artist: Eric Ladd
- Genre: Science fiction
- Publisher: Del Rey/Ballantine Books
- Publication date: 1979
- Media type: Mass market paperback
- Pages: 227
- ISBN: 0-345-27740-6

Convergent Series is a collection of science fiction and fantasy short stories by American writer Larry Niven, published in 1979. It is also the name of one of the short stories in the collection. The collection reprints the stories originally appearing in the 1969 collection The Shape of Space that were not part of the Known Space series (The Known Space stories were previously reprinted in 1975's Tales of Known Space and 1976's The Long ARM of Gil Hamilton). The collection includes newer stories, both fantasy and science fiction, some of which are in the Draco's Tavern series, none of which are in the Known Space series. The collection won the 1980 Locus Award for Best Single Author Collection.

== Table of contents ==
=== Reprinted from The Shape of Space ===
- "Bordered in Black" (Nebula Award nominee)
- "One Face"
- "Like Banquo's Ghost"
- "The Meddler"
- "Dry Run"
- "Convergent Series" (fantasy)
- "The Deadlier Weapon" (mainstream work of short fiction, not sf or fantasy)

=== Newer stories ===
- "The Nonesuch" (sf based loosely on Little Red Riding Hood)
- "Singularities Make Me Nervous" (whose protagonist has an art collection of "Eddie Jones originals")
- "The Schumann Computer" (Draco's Tavern)
- "Assimilating Our Culture, That's What They're Doing!" (Draco)
- "Grammar Lesson" (Draco)
- "The Subject is Closed" (Draco)
- "Cruel and Unusual" (Draco)
- "Transfer of Power" (fantasy inspired by Lord Dunsany's stories set at the "edge of the world")
- "Cautionary Tales"
- "Rotating Cylinders and the Possibility of Global Causality Violation"
- "Plaything"
- "Mistake"
- "Night on Mispec Moor"
- "Wrong Way Street"
