= The Height of the Scream =

- Dust-jacket illustration by Ron Fendel
- Author: Ramsey Campbell
- Cover artist: Ron Fendel
- Language: English
- Genre: Horror
- Publisher: Arkham House
- Publication date: 1976
- Publication place: United States
- Media type: Print (hardback)
- Pages: xx, 229
- ISBN: 0-87054-075-0
- OCLC: 2464232
- Dewey Decimal: 823/.9/14
- LC Class: PZ4.C1876 He3 PR6053.A4855

The Height of the Scream is a collection of horror stories by author Ramsey Campbell. Released in 1976 in an edition of 4,348 copies, it was the author's third collection of stories to be published by Arkham House.

It has since been reissued in various formats, most recently in a 2004 trade paperback from Babbage Press with a new introduction.

== Contents ==
The Height of the Scream contains the following stories:

- "Introduction and Allergies"
- "The Scar"
- "The Whining"
- "The Dark Show"
- "Missing"
- "Reply Guaranteed"
- "Jack's Little Friend"
- "Beside the Seaside"
- "The Cellars"
- "The Height of the Scream"
- "Litter"
- "Cyril"
- "Smoke Kiss"
- "The Words that Count"
- "Ash"
- "The Telephones"
- "In the Shadows"
- "Second Chance"
- "Horror House of Blood"

== Sources ==
- Jaffery, Sheldon (1989). The Arkham House Companion. Mercer Island, WA: Starmont House, Inc. p. 115. ISBN 1-55742-005-X.
- Chalker, Jack L.; Mark Owings (1998). The Science-Fantasy Publishers: A Bibliographic History, 1923-1998. Westminster, MD and Baltimore: Mirage Press, Ltd. p. 52.
- Joshi, S.T. (1999). Sixty Years of Arkham House: A History and Bibliography. Sauk City, WI: Arkham House. p. 139. ISBN 0-87054-176-5.
- Nielsen, Leon (2004). Arkham House Books: A Collector's Guide. Jefferson, NC and London: McFarland & Company, Inc. p. 122. ISBN 0-7864-1785-4.
