= Cold Print =

Short story collection by Ramsey Campbell

- First edition book cover
- Author: Ramsey Campbell
- Genre: Lovecraftian horror
- Publisher: Scream Press
- Publication date: March 1, 1985
- ISBN: 978-0-910-48913-3

Cold Print is a collection of Lovecraftian horror stories by British writer Ramsey Campbell, first published in 1985 by Scream/Press, reprinted in 1987 by Tor Books, and reissued in an expanded edition in 1993 by Headline.

== Contents ==
The original release of Cold Print contains all but three of the stories from Campbell's first collection, The Inhabitant of the Lake and Less Welcome Tenants (missing are "The Plain of Sound", "The Return of the Witch", and "The Mine on Yuggoth"). Also included are two stories ("The Church in High Street" and "The Stone on the Island"), which first appeared in anthologies edited by August Derleth, as well as later material written explicitly in the Lovecraft vein. "Among the pictures are these:" is not a narrative story but a description of numerous sketches made by the author.

The book is dedicated to Fritz Leiber and Robert Bloch, and contains two introductory pieces by the author, "Lovecraft: An Introduction" (1990) and "Chasing the Unknown" (1985).

The book contains the following stories:

- "The Church in High Street" (1962)
- "The Room in the Castle" (1964)
- "The Horror from the Bridge" (1964)
- "The Insects from Shaggai" (1964)
- "The Render of the Veils" (1964)
- "The Inhabitant of the Lake" (1964)
- "The Will of Stanley Brooke" (1964)
- "The Moon-Lens" (1964)
- "Before the Storm" (1980)
- "Cold Print" (1969)
- "Among the pictures are these:" (1980)
- "The Tugging" (1976)
- "The Faces at Pine Dunes" (1980)
- "Blacked Out" (1984)
- "The Voice of the Beach" (1982)

In addition, the expanded edition contains:

- "The Plain of Sound" (1964)
- "The Return of the Witch" (1964)
- "The Mine on Yuggoth" (1964)
- "The Stone on the Island" (1964)
- "The Franklyn Paragraphs" (1973)
- "A Madness from the Vaults" (1972)

== Reception ==
Dave Langford reviewed Cold Print for White Dwarf #93, and stated that "In this last tale, a complete abandonment of the standard, all too spoofable Mythos props brings Campbell full circle to the interesting part of Lovecraft's incoherent vision: a universe of vast uncaring entities who may happen to wither our minds, but like editors are fundamentally uninterested in us."

=== Reviews ===
- Review by Fritz Leiber (1985) in Locus, #293 June 1985
- Review by Michael A. Morrison (1985) in Fantasy Review, June 1985
- Review by Peter Cannon (1985) in Crypt of Cthulhu, #33 Lammas 1985
- Review by John Gregory Betancourt (1985) in Amazing Stories, November 1985
- Review by Doc Kennedy (1985) in Rod Serling's The Twilight Zone Magazine, December 1985
- Review by Andy Sawyer (1987) in Paperback Inferno, #67
- Review by Andy Robertson (1987) in Interzone, #22 Winter 1987
- Review by Robert M. Price (1994) in Crypt of Cthulhu, #86 Eastertide 1994
