= Ariosto (novel) =

1980 novel by Chelsea Quinn Yarbro

- First edition cover
- Author: Chelsea Quinn Yarbro
- Cover artist: Don Maltz
- Genre: Fantasy
- Publisher: Pocket Books
- Publication date: 1980
- Media type: Print (hardcover & paperback)

Ariosto is a novel by Chelsea Quinn Yarbro published in 1980.

== Plot ==
Ariosto is a novel that takes place partly in an alternate universe where Italia Federata is ruled by the Medicis, and partly in a fantasy world in the mind of a fictionalized version of Ludovico Ariosto.

== Reception ==
Greg Costikyan reviewed Ariosto in Ares Magazine #3 and commented that "Ariosto is well-written in a style that preserves the elan of the Renaissance without intruding greatly on the story. If you are as tired as I am of innumerable repetitive stories of valiant princes and heroic barbarians, you'll want to pick up a copy."

Ariosto was nominated for the 1981 World Fantasy Award.

It was nominated for a Locus Award for Best Fantasy Novel.

John O'Neill from Black Gate reports that it was also nominated for a Balrog Award.

== Reviews ==
- Review [French] by Pascal J. Thomas (1981) in Fiction, #324
- Review by David Pringle (1988) in Modern Fantasy: The Hundred Best Novels
- Review [French] by Patrick Imbert (2004) in Bifrost, #33
- Kliatt
