= Dark Feasts: The World of Ramsey Campbell =

Horror story collection by Ramsey Campbell

- First edition cover
- Author: Ramsey Campbell
- Language: English
- Genre: Horror
- Publisher: Robinson Publishing
- Publication date: 1987
- Publication place: United Kingdom
- Media type: Print
- Pages: 339 p.
- ISBN: 9780948164477
- OCLC: 16086081

Dark Feasts: The World of Ramsey Campbell is a collection of horror stories by Ramsey Campbell, published by Robinson Publishing in 1987. It is dedicated to T. E. D. Klein, "who helped launch me and wrote tales for me to aspire to" and contains an introduction by the author.

== Contents ==
The book includes the following stories, many of which had appeared in previous collections:

- "The Room in the Castle" (1964)
- "Cold Print" (1969)
- "The Scar" (1969)
- "The Interloper" (1973)
- "The Guy" (1973)
- "The End of a Summer's Day" (1973)
- "The Whining" (1973)
- "The Words that Count" (1976)
- "The Man in the Underpass" (1975)
- "Horror House of Blood" (1976)
- "The Companion" (1976)
- "Call First" (1975)
- "In the Bag" (1977)
- "The Chimney" (1977)
- "The Brood" (1980)
- "The Voice of the Beach" (1982)
- "Out of Copyright" (1982)
- "Above the World" (1979)
- "Mackintosh Willy" (1979)
- "The Ferries" (1982)
- "Midnight Hobo" (1979)
- "The Depths" (1982)
- "The Fit" (1980)
- "Hearing is Believing" (1981)
- "The Hands" (1986)
- "Again" (1981)
- "Just Waiting" (1983)
- "Seeing the World" (1984)
- "Apples" (1986)
- "Boiled Alive" (1986)
