= Uncanny Banquet =

First edition

Uncanny Banquet: Great Tales of the Supernatural is an anthology of reprinted horror stories edited by Ramsey Campbell and published by Little, Brown in 1992. The editor's intention, expressed in the introduction, was to "collect a range of stories as remarkable as the accredited classics of the field but less well known". The book contains the first reprinting of the novel The Hole of the Pit – "one of the first masterpieces of the novel of supernatural terror", according to Campbell – since its original publication in 1914.

The book contains the following stories:

- "Behind the Stumps" (1979) by Russell Kirk
- "A Horizon of Obelisks" (1981) by Dorothy K. Haynes
- "The Loony" (1984) by Alison Prince
- "The First-Nighter" (1908?) by Henry Normanby
- "The Hill and the Hole" (1947) by Fritz Leiber
- "Ravissante" (1968) by Robert Aickman
- "The Lady in Gray" (1988) by Donald Wandrei
- "A Mote" (1971) by Walter de la Mare
- "McGonagall in the Head" (1992) by Ramsey Campbell
- The Hole of the Pit (1914) by Adrian Ross
