= Scared Straight (disambiguation) =

Scared Straight! is a 1978 documentary film and a type of juvenile rehabilitation program named for it.

Scared Straight may also refer to:

- Scared Straight (band), an American punk band, now known as Ten Foot Pole
- Scared Straight (album), a 1996 album by New Bomb Turks
- "Scared Straight", a 2003 song by the Long Winters from When I Pretend to Fall
- "Scared Straight" (Beavis and Butt-Head), a 1993 television episode
- "Scared Straight" (Entourage), a 2009 television episode
- "Scared Straight" (The Golden Girls), a 1988 television episode
- "Scared Straight" (Saturday Night Live), a recurring sketch on Saturday Night Live

== See also ==
- Scared Stiff (disambiguation)
