= Dark Companions =

Short story collection by Ramsey Campbell

- First edition, cover art by Mark Watts
- Author: Ramsey Campbell
- Cover artist: Mark Watts
- Language: English
- Genre: Horror
- Publisher: Macmillan Publishers
- Publication date: 1982
- Publication place: United States
- Media type: Print
- Pages: 258 p.
- ISBN: 9780025210905
- OCLC: 7947779

Dark Companions is a collection of horror stories by Ramsey Campbell, first published by Macmillan Publishers in 1982. It contains an introduction by the author.

The stories included are:

- "The Chimney"
- "Down There"
- "Above the World"
- "Napier Court"
- "Out of Copyright"
- "The Depths"
- "The Man in the Underpass"
- "Vacant Possession"
- "The Little Voice"
- "Drawing In"
- "The Trick"
- "Heading Home"
- "The Show Goes On"
- "The Change"
- "Calling Card"
- "Baby"
- "In the Bag"
- "Conversion"
- "Mackintosh Willy"
- "Call First"
- "The Companion"
