= The Corn Maiden and Other Nightmares =

Book by Joyce Carol Oates

- Author: Joyce Carol Oates
- Language: English
- Publisher: Mysterious Press
- Publication date: November 1, 2011
- Publication place: United States
- Media type: Print (hardback & e-book) and audiobook
- Pages: 264 pp (first edition, hardback)
- ISBN: 0802126022 (first edition, hardback)

The Corn Maiden and Other Nightmares is a collection of short stories and the title novella by Joyce Carol Oates. Published in 2011 by Mysterious Press, it contains several works that Oates worked on over a period of fifteen years.

== Contents ==
The book contains the title novella and six short stories. All were previously published, as indicated:

- "The Corn Maiden" (anthology Transgressions: Ten Brand-New Novellas, 2005, as "The Corn Maiden: A Love Story")
- "Beersheba" (Ellery Queen's Mystery Magazine, September/October 2010)
- "Nobody Knows My Name" (anthology Twists of the Tale: An Anthology of Cat Horror, 1996)
- "Fossil-Figures" (anthology Stories: All-New Tales, 2010)
- "Death-Cup" (Ellery Queen's Mystery Magazine, August 1997)
- "Helping Hands" (Boulevard, Fall 2011)
- "A Hole in the Head" (The Kenyon Review, Fall 2010)

The story contents range from a group of teenage girls planning to sacrifice one of their classmates in "The Corn Maiden" to a widow interacting with an employee of a second-hand store in "Helping Hands". Many contain the theme of sibling rivalry.

== Reception ==
Critical reception for The Corn Maiden and Other Nightmares has been positive, with Kirkus Reviews calling the book "nightmarish". Publishers Weekly praised the book, calling Oates "a master of psychological dread" but wrote that the audio book's narrator Christine Williams "lacks the emotional punch and range displayed" by the book's other narrator. The Star Tribune and Bookreporter both praised the book, with Bookreporter praising the book's palpable anxiety.
