= Waking Nightmares =

1991 collection of horror stories by Ramsey Campbell

First edition (US)

Waking Nightmares is a collection of horror stories by Ramsey Campbell, first published in 1991 by Tor Books. The first British edition was published in 1992 by Little, Brown. It contains an introduction by the author.

The collection includes the following stories:

- "The Guide" (1989)
- "Next Time You'll Know Me" (1988)
- "Second Sight" (1987)
- "The Trick" (1980)
- "In the Trees" (1986)
- "Another World" (1987)
- "Playing the Game" (1988)
- "Bedtime Story" (1986)
- "Watch the Birdie" (1984)
- "Old Clothes" (1985)
- "Beyond Words" (1986)
- "Jack in the Box" (1983)
- "Eye of Childhood" (1982)
- "The Other Side" (1986)
- "Where the Heart Is" (1987)
- "Being an Angel" (1989)
- "It Helps If You Sing" (1989)
- "The Old School" (1989)
- "Meeting the Author" (1989)
