= Driving Blind =

Short story collection by Ray Bradbury

- dust-jacket from the first edition
- Author: Ray Bradbury
- Cover artist: Bernie Fuchs
- Language: English
- Genre: Fantasy and science fiction
- Publisher: Avon Books
- Publication date: 1997
- Publication place: United States
- Media type: Print (hardback)
- Pages: 261 pp
- ISBN: 0-380-97381-2
- OCLC: 37031086
- Dewey Decimal: 813/.54 21
- LC Class: PS3503.R167 D75 1997

Driving Blind is a 1997 short story collection by American writer Ray Bradbury. All but four of the stories are original to this collection.

== Contents ==
- "Night Train to Babylon"
- "If MGM Is Killed, Who Gets the Lion?"
- "Hello, I Must Be Going"
- "House Divided"
- "Grand Theft"
- "Remember Me?"
- "Fee Fie Foe Fum"
- "Driving Blind"
- "I Wonder What’s Become of Sally"
- "Nothing Changes"
- "That Old Dog Lying in the Dust"
- "Someone in the Rain"
- "Madame Et Monsieur Shill"
- "The Mirror"
- "End of Summer"
- "Thunder in the Morning"
- "The Highest Branch on the Tree"
- "A Woman Is a Fast-Moving Picnic"
- "Virgin Resusitas"
- "Mr. Pale"
- "That Bird That Comes Out of the Clock"
- A Brief Afterword
