= Just Behind You =

First edition, cover art by James Hannah

Just Behind You is a collection of nineteen horror stories by Ramsey Campbell, originally published by PS Publishing in 2009. A paperback edition was published by Drugstore Indian Press in 2013.

In his review of the collection for the British Fantasy Society, Paul Campbell described the book as “superb”, and explained of Campbell “……the reason he’s the best living horror writer today is because he has the ability – unequalled by any other practitioner – to imbue his prose with a sense of foreboding and menace. On every single line. Of every single paragraph. On every single page. The story lines themselves are enough to haunt, but combined with his (in the strictest dictionary definition of the word) unique style causes the reader’s arms to run cold with gooseflesh.” Publishers Weekly noted, "British horror master Campbell (Told by the Dead) displays his gift for the unsettling in this collection of 18 recent short stories."

== Contents ==
The stories included are:

- "Fear the Dead" (2003)
- "Digging Deep" (2007)
- "Double Room" (2008)
- "The Place of Revelation" (2003)
- "The Winner" (2005)
- "One Copy Only" (2002)
- "Laid Down" (2004)
- "Unblinking" (2005)
- "Breaking Up" (2004)
- "Respects" (2008)
- "Feeling Remains" (2003)
- "Direct Line" (2004)
- "Skeleton Woods" (2005)
- "The Unbeheld" (2002)
- "The Announcement" (2005)
- "Dragged Down" (2008)
- "Raised by the Moon" (2001)
- "Just Behind You" (2005)
- "Safe Words" (2009)
