= Sarban (author) =

British writer and diplomat

- Born: 6 November 1910; Mexborough, Yorkshire, England
- Died: 11 April 1989 (aged 78); Pen y Fan, Wales
- Education: Jesus College, Cambridge
- Occupation: Diplomat
- Writing career
- Pen name: Sarban

John William Wall (6 November 1910 – 11 April 1989), pen name Sarban, was a British writer and diplomat. Wall's diplomatic career lasted more than thirty years, but his writing career as Sarban was brief and not prolific, ending during the early 1950s. Sarban is described in The Encyclopedia of Fantasy as "a subtle, literate teller of tales, conscious of the darker and less acceptable implications that underlie much popular literature". Wall cited the supernatural fiction of Arthur Machen and Walter de la Mare as influences on his work.

== Early life ==
Wall was born in Mexborough in Yorkshire, the son of George William Wall, a passenger guard on the Great Central Railway, and Maria Ellen (née Moffatt) Wall. After Mexborough School, he studied English at Jesus College, Cambridge and received first-class honours. He also studied Arabic and took the Consular Service Examination.

Wall married Eleanor Alexander Riesle on 20 January 1950 and they had one daughter. Wall and his wife were legally separated in 1971.

== Diplomatic service ==
He chose a diplomatic career in the Near East because "[James Elroy] Flecker, whose poetry I had loved in my school days, had been in the Levant Consular Service", and owing to "a liking for travel and oriental philology". During 1933, Wall was posted initially as Probationer Vice-Consul at Beirut, Lebanon. Subsequently, he was stationed at Jeddah in Saudi Arabia, Tabriz and Esfahan in Iran, and Casablanca in Morocco. He was posted as the first Political Agent to the Trucial States in Dubai following the relocation of the seat of British representative from Sharjah to Dubai in 1953. After WWII, he was Counsellor at the British Middle East Office in Cairo until 1952. He was British Ambassador to Paraguay 1957–1958 and Consul-General at Alexandria 1963–1965. He was honoured in 1953 as a Companion of the Order of St Michael & St George for his diplomatic work.

Wall continued to work for the Foreign Office, at first in a teaching position in London, 1966–1970, and then at the Government Communications Headquarters, a secret surveillance centre, in Cheltenham. Wall retired from the Foreign Office during 1977, and retired to Monmouthshire.

== Literary works ==
Sarban's most famous literary work is the alternative-history novel The Sound of His Horn (1952), which presupposes that the Nazis have won the Second World War and built parks where they hunt genetically altered humans for sport. Sarban also published two collections of fantasy stories: Ringstones and Other Curious Tales (1951) and The Doll Maker and Other Tales of the Uncanny (1953).

The Sacrifice and Other Stories (2002) collects four novellas, two of which, the title story and "The Sea-Things", appeared in print for the first time, while "Number Fourteen" had been published in a later edition of Ringstones, and "The King of the Lake" had been added to a later edition of The Sound of His Horn.

Further previously unpublished work, including poems, a one-act play, extracts from two novels and unpublished stories, has been collected in Discovery of Heretics (2010).

== Bibliography ==
- Ringstones and Other Curious Tales, Peter Davies, 1951
  - also Tartarus Press, 2000 (350 copies; adds "Number Fourteen")
- The Sound of His Horn, Peter Davies, 1952
  - also Tartarus Press, 1999 (350 numbered copies; adds "The King of the Lake")
- The Doll Maker Other Tales of the Uncanny, Peter Davies, 1953. Note: The Ballantine paperback reprint (1960) omits two stories.
- The Sacrifice, Tartarus Press, 2002 (350 copies)
- Discovery of Heretics, Tartarus Press, 2011
