= Little Deaths (anthology) =

- First edition
- Author: edited by Ellen Datlow
- Language: English
- Genre: Fantasy, Horror short stories
- Publisher: Millenium
- Publication date: 1994
- Publication place: United States
- Media type: Print (hardback)
- Pages: 454 pp
- ISBN: 1-85798-014-X
- OCLC: 33023121

Little Deaths: 24 Tales of Horror and Sex is an anthology of stories edited by Ellen Datlow. It was published by Millenium in September 1994. The anthology contains 24 stories horror relating to sex. The anthology itself won the 1995 World Fantasy Award for Best Anthology.

== Contents ==
- Introduction (Little Deaths: 24 Tales of Sex and Horror) • (1994) • essay by Ellen Datlow
- "The Lady of Situations", by Stephen Dedman
- "Hungry Skin", by Lucy Taylor
- "Becky Lives", by Harry Crews
- "Lover Doll", by Wayne Allen Sallee
- "The Swing", by Nicholas Royle
- "Sahib", by J. Calvin Pierce
- "The Careful Geometry of Love", by Kathe Koja and Barry N. Malzberg
- "Yaguara", by Nicola Griffith
- "On Amen's Shore", by Clive Barker
- "Isobel Avens Returns to Stepney in the Spring", by M. John Harrison
- "The Pain Barrier", by Joel Lane
- "Sinfonia Expansiva", by Barry N. Malzberg
- "Fever Blisters", by Joyce Carol Oates
- "The Rock", by Melanie Tem
- "An Outside Interest", by Ruth Rendell
- "And Salome Danced", by Kelley Eskridge
- "The Disquieting Muse", by Kathe Koja
- "Holes", by Sarah Clemens
- "That Old School Tie", by Jack Womack
- "Ice Palace", by Douglas Clegg
- "Serial Monogamist", by Pat Cadigan
- "Black Nightgown", by K. W. Jeter
- "Menage a Trois", by Richard Christian Matheson
- "The Last Time", by Lucius Shepard

== Reprints ==
- Dell Publishing, September 1995.
