= Holes for Faces =

First edition's cover by Santiago Caruso

Holes for Faces is a collection of fourteen horror stories by English writer Ramsey Campbell, published by Dark Regions Press in 2013.

FEARnet.com noted of the collection, "Campbell has been penning quiet, devastating horror stories since the mid-1960s, and this new collection Holes for Faces (gathering stories exclusively from the 2000s) proves he still knows how to unsettle readers on a primal level…Consider Holes for Faces another textbook by one of our best practitioners, an essential addition to the bookshelves of horror readers and writers alike."

== Contents ==
The stories included are:

- "Passing through Peacehaven" (2011)
- "Peep" (2007)
- "Getting It Wrong" (2011)
- "The Room Beyond" (2011)
- "Holes for Faces" (2013)
- "The Rounds" (2010)
- "The Decorations" (2005)
- "The Address" (2011)
- "Recently Used" (2011)
- "Chucky Comes to Liverpool" (2010)
- "With the Angels" (2010)
- "Behind the Doors" (2011)
- "Holding the Light" (2011)
- "The Long Way" (2008)
