= Told by the Dead =

2003 collection of stories by Ramsey Campbell

First edition, cover art by David Kendall.

Told by the Dead is a collection of horror stories by British writer Ramsey Campbell, published by PS Publishing in 2003. The first edition contains a foreword by Poppy Z. Brite and an afterword by the author. It won the 2004 British Fantasy Award for best collection.

The stories included are:

- "Return Journey" (2000)
- "Twice by Fire" (1998)
- "Agatha's Ghost" (1999)
- "Little Ones" (1999)
- "The Last Hand" (1975)
- "Facing It" (1995)
- "Never to be Heard" (1998)
- "The Previous Tenant" (1975)
- "Becoming Visible" (1999)
- "No End of Fun" (2002)
- "After the Queen" (1977)
- "Tatters" (2001)
- "Accident Zone" (1995)
- "The Entertainment" (1999)
- "Dead Letters" (1978)
- "All for Sale" (2001)
- "No Strings" (2000)
- "The Worst Fog of the Year" (1990)
- "The Retrospective" (2002)
- "Slow" (1985)
- "Worse than Bones" (2001)
- "No Story In It" (2000)
- "The Word" (1997)
