= Scared Stiff: Tales of Sex and Death =

1987 collection of horror stories on sexual themes by Ramsey Campbell

- Author: Ramsey Campbell
- Genre: Horror
- Publisher: Scream/Press
- Publication date: 1987

Scared Stiff: Tales of Sex and Death is a collection of horror stories on sexual themes by Ramsey Campbell, first published in the United States in 1987 by Scream/Press. The first British edition was published in 1989 by Macdonald. The book includes an introduction by Clive Barker and an afterword by the author, and is illustrated by J. K. Potter.

The stories included are:

- "Dolls" (1974)
- "The Other Woman" (1974)
- "Lilith's" (1976)
- "The Seductress" (1976)
- "Stages" (1987)
- "Loveman's Comeback" (1977)
- "Merry May" (1986)

Some of the earlier stories were previously included in anthologies compiled by Michael Parry.

== Critical reception ==
The book was described by J.K. Potter as "the most disturbing book I ever worked with". In Michael A. Morrison's review of the book in Science Fiction and Fantasy Book Review Annual 1988, he regarded the collection as "something special", and that Cambell had "gained entry to a vein of nihilism darker than any he had heretofore tapped". S.T. Joshi considered this one of Ramsey's finest collections, with the tales "among his most affecting stories".

The collection was nominated for a World Fantasy Award in 1988.
