= The Inhabitant of the Lake and Less Welcome Tenants =

1964 collection of short stories by J. Ramsey Campbell

- Dust-jacket illustration by Frank Utpatel.
- Author: J. Ramsey Campbell
- Cover artist: Frank Utpatel
- Language: English
- Genre: Fantasy, horror
- Publisher: Arkham House
- Publication date: 1964
- Publication place: United States
- Media type: Print (hardback)
- Pages: xii, 207

The Inhabitant of the Lake and Less Welcome Tenants is a collection of fantasy and horror short stories by British author J. Ramsey Campbell, who dropped the initial from his name in subsequent publications. Initially announced under the title The Box in the Priory it was released in 1964 by Arkham House in an edition of 2,009 copies and was the author's first book. The stories are part of the Cthulhu Mythos. Campbell had originally written his introduction to be included in the book The Dark Brotherhood and Other Pieces under the title "Cthulhu in Britain". However, Arkham's editor, August Derleth, decided to use it here (retitled "A Word from the Author").

The stories utilise such settings as Brichester, Goatswood and Clotton - Campbell's equivalent English invented locales comprising the Severn Valley, based upon H. P. Lovecraft's invention of such locales as Arkham, Dunwich, and Kingsport. The title story introduces Campbell's fictitious book of occult lore, the Revelations of Gla'aki, similar to Lovecraft's Necronomicon.

== Later versions ==
Most of the contents (three stories omitted) were reprinted, with some of Campbell's later Lovecraftian work, in his 1985 collection Cold Print. The expanded/definitive edition of Cold Print (Headline, 1993) includes all the tales from The Inhabitant of the Lake and Less Welcome Tenants. Two forewords by Campbell, both different from that in the Arkham House edition (which is titled "A Word from the Author"), were included.

The original book was reissued in an expanded and illustrated version promoted as a 'fiftieth anniversary edition' by PS Publishing in 2011. (The Arkham House edition was published in 1964, but Campbell began writing the stories that appear in it in 1961, and continued through 1963). The expanded reissue appears under the title Campbell had originally intended - The Inhabitant of the Lake and Other Unwelcome Tenants - and as by Ramsey Campbell. As well as the stories from the 1964 Arkham House version, the volume prints the early drafts of the tales as they were before being revised according to Derleth's suggestions (these early drafts had previously been gathered in Crypt of Cthulhu 6, No 1 (Whole Number 43) (Hallowmas 1986) (The Tomb-Herd and Others); together with correspondence between Derleth and Campbell regarding the collection.

Campbell explains the story of the volume's original mistitling in his 'Afterword' to the new edition, as follows: "... I suggested The Inhabitant of the Lake. Derleth thought we might add and Other Unwelcome Tenants, and I liked that too. Alas, when he sent Frank Utpatel instructions for the cover art, he misremembered the addition as and Less Welcome Tenants (perhaps with his own forthcoming Colonel Markesan and Less Pleasant Persons in mind). The title had to be changed to match the cover, though I felt few tenants could be less welcome than Glaaki. Now, for the first time ever, the book bears the chosen title. Welcome!"

== Contents ==
The Inhabitant of the Lake and Less Welcome Tenants contains the following tales:

- "The Room in the Castle"
- "The Horror from the Bridge"
- "The Insects from Shaggai"
- "The Render of the Veils"
- "The Inhabitant of the Lake"
- "The Plain of Sound"
- "The Return of the Witch"
- "The Mine on Yuggoth"
- "The Will of Stanley Brooke"
- "The Moon-Lens"

=== References in popular culture ===
The band Iron Maiden's song "Still Life", from the 1983 album Piece of Mind, was inspired by the story "The Inhabitant of the Lake". The lyrics deal with a man who sees spirits or beings in the lake and becomes obsessed with them. After many nightmares and visions of the images in the water, he eventually becomes insane and ultimately jumps into the pool with his female companion.

== Sources ==
- Jaffery, Sheldon (1989). The Arkham House Companion. Mercer Island, WA: Starmont House, Inc. pp. 71–72. ISBN 1-55742-005-X.
- Chalker, Jack L.; Mark Owings (1998). The Science-Fantasy Publishers: A Bibliographic History, 1923-1998. Westminster, MD and Baltimore: Mirage Press, Ltd. p. 41.
- Joshi, S.T. (1999). Sixty Years of Arkham House: A History and Bibliography. Sauk City, WI: Arkham House. pp. 82–83. ISBN 0-87054-176-5.
- Nielsen, Leon (2004). Arkham House Books: A Collector's Guide. Jefferson, NC and London: McFarland & Company, Inc. p. 90. ISBN 0-7864-1785-4.
- Tales of the Miskatonic Valley by Nick Hagger, Fred Behrendt, Mark Morrison, Geoff Gillan and Mike Szymanski (1992, Paperback), ISBN 9780933635838
- Fade to Grey Adventure. Insect from Shaggai#Massa di Requiem per Shuggay
