= Bram Stoker Award for Best Poetry Collection =

Horror poetry award

The Bram Stoker Award for Poetry Collection is an award presented by the Horror Writers Association (HWA) for "superior achievement" in horror writing for a poetry collection.

== Winners and nominees ==
Bram Stoker Award for Poetry Collection winners and nominees
Year of Eligibility	Recipient	Title	Result	Citation
2000	Tom Piccirilli	A Student of Hell	Won	
2000	Michael A. Arnzen	Paratabloids	Nominated	
2000	Bruce Boston	The Complete Accursed Wives	Nominated	
2000	Sandy DeLuca	Burial Plot in Sagittarius	Nominated	
2001	Linda Addison	Consumed, Reduced to Beautiful Grey Ashes	Won	
2001	Bruce Boston	White Space	Nominated	
2001	Chad Hensley	What the Cacodaemon Whispered	Nominated	
2001	Charlee Jacob	Taunting the Minotaur	Nominated	
2002	Rain Graves, Mark McLaughlin, and David Niall Wilson	The Gossamer Eye	Won	
2002	Bruce Boston and Marge Simon	Night Smoke	Nominated	
2002	Charlee Jacob	Guises (Poetry Section "Night Unmasked")	Nominated	
2002	Tom Piccirilli	This Cape Is Red Because I've Been Bleeding	Nominated	
2003	Bruce Boston	Pitchblende	Won	
2003	Michael A. Arnzen	Gorelets: Unpleasant Poems	Nominated	
2003	Daphne Gottlieb	Final Girl	Nominated	
2003	Charlee Jacob	Cardinal Sins	Nominated	
2003	Mark McLaughlin	Professor LaGungo's Exotic Artifacts & Assorted Mystic Collectibles	Nominated	
2003	Marge Simon	Artist of Antithesis	Nominated	
2004	Corrine de Winter	The Women at the Funeral	Won	
2004	Charlee Jacob	The Desert	Nominated	
2004	Mark McLaughlin	Men Are From Hell, Women Are From The Galaxy Of Death	Nominated	
2004	Tom Piccirilli	Waiting My Turn to Go Under the Knife	Nominated	
2005	Michael A. Arnzen	Freakcidents	Won (tie)	
2005	Charlee Jacob	Sineater	Won (tie)	
2005	Gary William Crawford	The Shadow City	Nominated	
2005	Daniel Shields	Seasons: A Series of Poems Based on the Life and Death of Edgar Allan Poe	Nominated	
2006	Bruce Boston	Shades Fantastic	Won	
2006	Corrine de Winter	Valentine: Short Love Poems	Nominated	
2006	John Edward Lawson	The Troublesome Amputee	Nominated	
2006	Bobbi Sinha-Morey	Songs of a Sorceress	Nominated	
2007	Linda Addison	Being Full of Light, Insubstantial	Won (tie)	
2007	Charlee Jacob & Marge Simon	VECTORS: A Week in the Death of a Planet	Won (tie)	
2007	Charlee Jacob	Heresy	Nominated	
2007	Mark McLaughlin	PHANTASMAPEDIA	Nominated	
2007	JoSelle Vanderhooft	Ossuary	Nominated	
2008	Bruce Boston	The Nightmare Collection	Won	
2008	Gary William Crawford	The Phantom World	Nominated	
2008	Corrine de Winter	Virgin of the Apocalypse	Nominated	
2008	Michael McCarty and Mark McLaughlin	Attack of the Two-Headed Poetry Monster	Nominated	
2009	Lucy A. Snyder	Chimeric Machines	Won	
2009	Rain Graves	Barfodder	Nominated	
2009	Bruce Boston	Double Visions	Nominated	
2009	Bruce Boston	North Left of Earth	Nominated	
2010	Bruce Boston	Dark Matters	Won	
2010	Ann K. Schwader	Wild Hunt of the Stars	Nominated	
2010	Robin Spriggs	Diary of a Gentleman Diabolist	Nominated	
2010	Wrath James White	Vicious Romance	Nominated	
2011	Linda Addison	How to Recognize a Demon Has Become Your Friend	Won	
2011	Maria Alexander	At Louche Ends: Poetry for the Decadent, the Damned & the Absinthe-Minded	Nominated	
2011	Bruce Boston	Surrealities	Nominated	
2011	G. O. Clark	Shroud of Night	Nominated	
2011	Marge Simon	The Mad Hattery	Nominated	
2011	Marge Simon	Unearthly Delights	Nominated	
2012	Marge Simon	Vampires, Zombies & Wanton Souls	Won	
2012	Linda Addison and Stephen M. Wilson	Dark Duet	Nominated	
2012	Bruce Boston and Gary William Crawford	Notes from the Shadow City	Nominated	
2012	Michael R. Collings	A Verse to Horrors	Nominated	
2012	Mary A. Turzillo	Lovers & Killers	Nominated	
2013	Linda Addison, Rain Graves, Charlee Jacob, and Marge Simon	Four Elements	Won	
2013	Bruce Boston	Dark Roads: Selected Long Poems 1971-2012	Nominated	
2013	Helen Marshall	The Sex Lives of Monsters	Nominated	
2013	Sandy DeLuca and Marge Simon	Dangerous Dreams	Nominated	
2013	Stephanie M. Wytovich	Hysteria: A Collection of Madness	Nominated	
2014	Tom Piccirilli	Forgiving Judas	Won	
2014	Robert Payne Cabeen	Fearworms: Selected Poems	Nominated	
2014	Corrine de Winter and Alessandro Manzetti	Venus Intervention	Nominated	
2014	Marge Simon and Mary Turzillo	Sweet Poison	Nominated	
2014	Stephanie M. Wytovich	Mourning Jewelry	Nominated	
2015	Alessandro Manzetti	Eden Underground	Won	
2015	Ann K. Schwader	Dark Energies	Nominated	
2015	Stephanie M. Wytovich	An Exorcism of Angels	Nominated	
2015	Marge Simon	Naughty Ladies	Nominated	
2015	Bruce Boston	Resonance Dark and Light	Nominated	
2016	Stephanie M. Wytovich	Brothel	Won	
2016	Michael R. Collings	Corona Obscura	Nominated	
2016	Jeannine Hall Gailey	Field Guide to the End of the World	Nominated	
2016	Bruce Boston and Alessandro Manzetti	Sacrificial Nights	Nominated	
2016	Marge Simon	Small Spirits	Nominated	
2017	Christina Sng	A Collection of Nightmares	Won	
2017	Bruce Boston and Robert Frazier	Visions of the Mutant Rain Forest	Nominated	
2017	Alessandro Manzetti	No Mercy	Nominated	
2017	Marge Simon and Mary Turzillo	Satan's Sweethearts	Nominated	
2017	Stephanie M. Wytovich	Sheet Music to My Acoustic Nightmare	Nominated	
2018	Sara Tantlinger	The Devil's Dreamland	Won	
2018	Bruce Boston	Artifacts	Nominated	
2018	David E. Cowen	Bleeding Saffron	Nominated	
2018	Donna Lynch	Witches	Nominated	
2018	Alessandro Manzetti and Marge Simon	War	Nominated	
2019	Linda Addison and Alessandro Manzetti	The Place of Broken Things	Won	
2019	Octavia Cade	Mary Shelley Makes a Monster	Nominated	
2019	Donna Lynch	Choking Back the Devil	Nominated	
2019	Michelle Scalise	Dragonfly and Other Songs of Mourning	Nominated	
2019	Bryan D. Dietrich and Marge Simon	The Demeter Diaries	Nominated	
2019	Stephanie M. Wytovich	The Apocalyptic Mannequin	Nominated	
2020	Christina Sng	A Collection of Dreamscapes	Won	
2020	Alessandro Manzetti	Whitechapel Rhapsody: Dark Poems	Nominated	
2020	Jessica McHugh	A Complex Accident of Life	Nominated	
2020	Cynthia Pelayo	Into the Forest and All the Way Through	Nominated	
2020	Sara Tantlinger	Cradleland of Parasites	Nominated	
2021	Geneve Flynn, Lee Murray, Angela Yuriko Smith, and Christina Sng	Tortured Willows: Bent. Bowed. Unbroken.	Won	
2021	Joe R. Lansdale	Apache Witch and Other Poetic Observations	Nominated	
2021	Jessica McHugh	Strange Nests	Nominated	
2021	Marge Simon and Mary Turzillo	Victims	Nominated	
2021	Lucy A. Snyder	Exposed Nerves	Nominated	
2022
2022	Cynthia Pelayo	Crime Scene	Winner	
2022	Michael Bailey and Marge Simon	Sifting the Ashes	Nominated	
2022	Donna Lynch	Girls from the County	Nominated	
2022	Sumiko Saulson	The Rat King: A Book of Dark Poetry	Nominated	
2022	Christina Sng	The Gravity of Existence	Nominated	
2023			Nominated	
2023	Stephanie M. Wytovich	On the Subject of Blackberries	Winner	
2023	Maxwell Ian Gold	Bleeding Rainbows and Other Broken Spectrums	Nominee	
2023	Jessica McHugh	The Quiet Ways I Destroy You	Nominee	
2023	Marisca Pichette	Rivers in Your Skin, Sirens in Your Hair	Nominee	
2023	Holly Lyn Walrath	Numinous Stones	Nominee	
2024
2024	Pedro Iniguez	Mexicans on the Moon: Speculative Poetry from a Possible Future	Winner	
2024	Jamal Hodge	The Dark Between the Twilight	Nominee	
2024	Lee Murray	Fox Spirit on a Distant Cloud	Nominee	
2024	Sumiko Saulson	Melancholia: A Book of Dark Poetry	Nominee	
2024	L. Marie Wood	Imitation of Life	Nominee	
2025	Linda D. Addison & Jamal Hodge	Everything Endless	Winner	
2025	Maxwell I. Gold	Songs of Enough: An Inferno All My Own	Nominee	
2025	Shannon Kearns	The Uterus is an Impossible Forest	Nominee	
2025	Cate Peebles	The Haunting	Nominee	
2025	MarieAnn C Raguso	Allegories of Beauty & Violence: a collection of Gothic Romance Poems	Nominee	
