= Bram Stoker Award for Best Short Non-Fiction =

The Bram Stoker Award for Best Short Non-Fiction, established in 2019, is an award presented by the Horror Writers Association (HWA) for "superior achievement" in horror writing for short non-fiction.

== Honorees ==
Bram Stoker Award for Best Short Non-Fiction winners and finalists
Year	Author	Title	Publication	Publisher	Result	Ref.
2019
2019	Gwendolyn Kiste	Magic, Madness, and Women Who Creep: The Power of Individuality in the Work of Charlotte Perkins Gilman	Vastarien: A Literary Journal, Vol. 2, Issue 1		Winner	
2019	Vince A. Liaguno	Slasher Films Made Me Gay: The Queer Appeal and Subtext of the Genre	LGBTQ+ Horror Month: 9/1/2019, Ginger Nuts of Horror		Finalist	
2019	Karen J. Renner	The Evil Aging Women of American Horror Story	Elder Horror: Essays on Film’s Frightening Images of Aging	McFarland	Finalist	
2019	Kelly Robinson	Film's First Lycanthrope: 1913's The Werewolf	Scary Monsters Magazine #114		Finalist	
2019	Valerie E. Weich	Lord Byron's Whipping Boy: Dr. John William Polidori and the 200th Anniversary of The Vampyre	Famous Monsters of Filmland, Issue #291		Finalist	
2020
2020	Tim Waggoner	Speaking of Horror	The Writer		Winner	
2020	Rhonda Jackson Joseph	The Beloved Haunting of Hill House: An Examination of Monstrous Motherhood	The Streaming of Hill House: Essays on the Haunting Netflix Adaption	McFarland	Finalist	
2020	Cynthia Pelayo	I Need to Believe	Southwest Review, Vol. 105.3		Finalist	
2020	Kelly Robinson	Lost, Found, and Finally Unbound: The Strange History of the 1910 Edison Frankenstein	Rue Morgue, June 2020		Finalist	
2020	Christina Sng	Final Girl: A Life in Horror	Interstellar Flight Magazine, October 2020		Finalist	
2021
2021	Angela Yuriko Smith	Horror Writers: Architects of Hope	The Sirens Call, Halloween 2021, Issue 55	Sirens Call Publications	Winner	
2021	Cindy O'Quinn	One and Done	Were Tales: A Shapeshifter Anthology	Brigids Gate Press	Finalist	
2021	Dejan Ognjanović	The Three Paradigms of Horror	Vastarien, Vol. 4, Issue 2	Grimscribe Press	Finalist	
2021	Emily Ruth Verona	A Horror Fan’s Guide to Surviving Womanhood	thefinalgirls.co.uk		Finalist	
2021	Kevin J. Wetmore Jr.	Devil's Advocates: The Conjuring		Auteur Publishing/Liverpool University Press	Finalist	
2022	Aaron Dries	Nona Doesn't Dance	Cut to Care: A Collection of Little Hurts	IFWG Australia, IFWG International	Finalist	
2022	Douglas Gwilym	Poppy's Poppy	Penumbric Speculative Fiction Magazine, Vol. V, No. 6		Finalist	
2022	J.A.W. McCarthy	The Only Thing Different Will Be the Body	A Woman Built by Man	Cemetery Gates Media	Finalist	
2023
2023	Nadia Bulkin	Becoming Ungovernable: Latah, Amok, and Disorder in Indonesia	Unquiet Spirits: Essays by Asian Women in Horror	Black Spot Books	Winner	
2023	Carina Bissett	Words Wielded by Women	Apex Magazine		Nominee	
2023	K.P. Kulski	Everything the Darkness Eats	Unquiet Spirits: Essays by Asian Women in Horror	Black Spot Books	Nominee	
2023	Lee Murray	Displaced Spirits	Unquiet Spirits: Essays by Asian Women in Horror	Black Spot Books	Nominee	
2023	Kevin Wetmore, Jr	A Theatre of Ghosts, a Haunted Cinema: The Japanese Gothic as Theatrical Tradition in Gurozuka	Special Issue on Asian Gothic 6/23	Wenshan Review of Literature and Culture	Nominee	
2024
2024	Lisa Wood	Blacks in Film and Cultivated Bias	No More Haunted Dolls: Horror Fiction that Transcends the Tropes	Vernon Press	Winner	
2024	Michael Arnzen	Screamin’ in the Rain: The Orchestration of Catharsis in William Castle’s The Tingler	What Sleeps Beneath		Nominee	
2024	Vince A. Liaguno	The Horror of Donna Berzatto and Her Feast of the Seven Fishes	You’re Not Alone in the Dark	Cemetery Dance Publications	Nominee	
2024	Jeffrey Andrew Weinstock	Hidden Histories: The Many Ghosts of Disney’s Haunted Mansion	Disney Gothic: Dark Shadows in the House of Mouse	Lexington Books	Nominee	
2024	Kevin J. Wetmore, Jr	Jackson and Haunting of the Stage	Journal of Shirley Jackson Studies, Vol. 2 No. 1	Shirley Jackson Studies	Nominee	
2025	Tananarive Due*	“My Long Road to Horror”	Why I Love Horror: Essays on Horror Fiction	Saga Press	Winner	
2025	Patrick Barb	“Deathwish Wolf Man: The Tragic Hero at the Heart of the Universal Monster”	Interstellar Flight Magazine	Interstellar Flight Press	Finalist	
2025	Stephen Graham Jones	“Why Horror”	Why I Love Horror: Essays on Horror Fiction	Saga Press	Finalist	
2025	Mo Moshaty	“Haunted Thresholds: Liminal Horror and the Psychological Disintegration of Women from Post-Partum, Grief, Trauma and Religious Fanaticism”	Darkest Margins: 24 Essays on Liminality and Liminal Spaces in the Horror Genre	1428 Publishing Ltd	Finalist	
2025	Cynthia Pelayo	“My Mother Was Margaret White”	Why I Love Horror: Essays on Horror Fiction	Saga Press	Finalist	
