= Linda Addison (poet) =

American poet & writer (born 1952)

Linda D. Addison
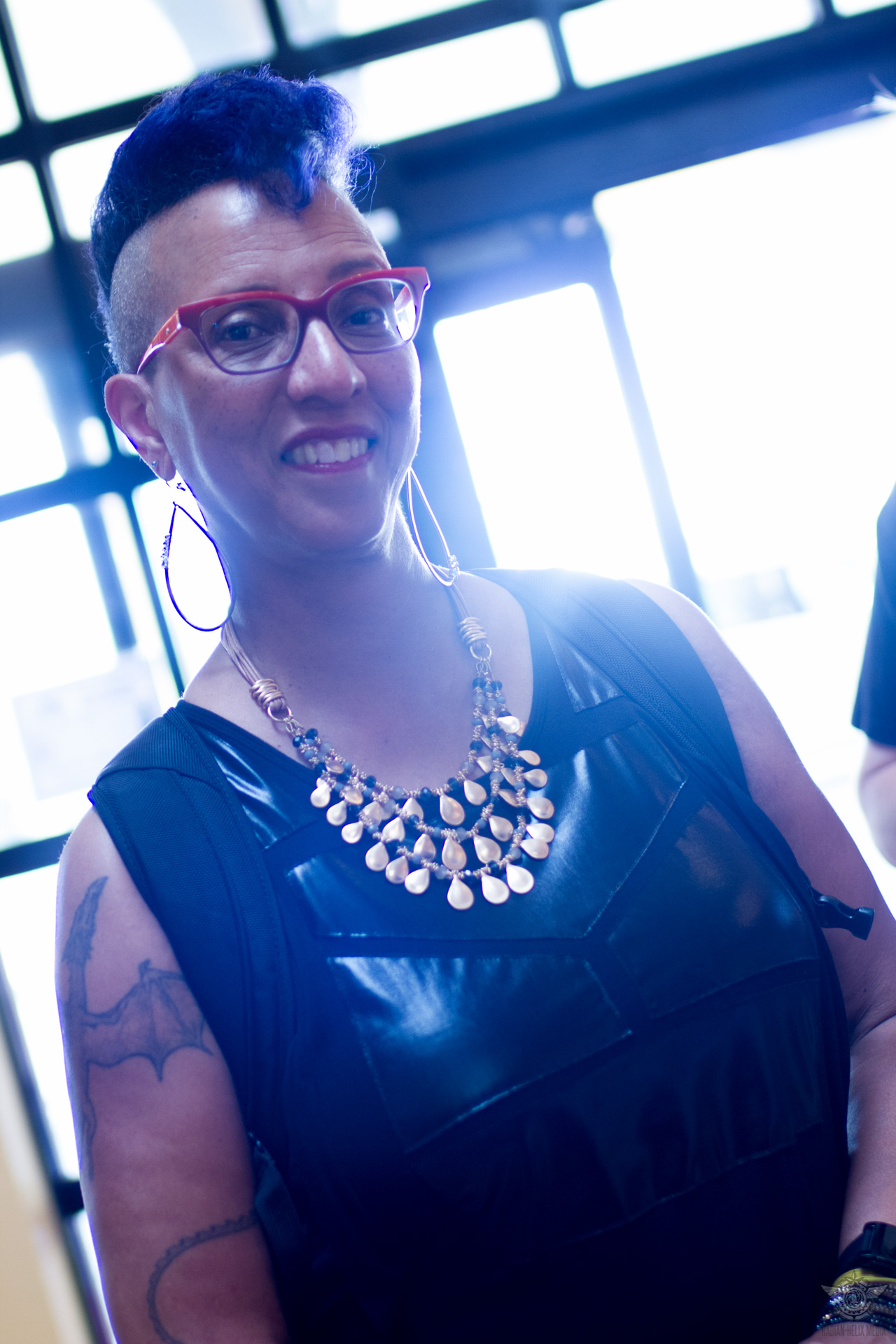
- Linda Addison in 2014
- Born: September 8, 1952 (age 74); Philadelphia, Pennsylvania, U.S.
- Education: Carnegie Mellon University (BS)
- Occupation: Writer

Linda D. Addison (born September 8, 1952) is an American poet and writer of horror, fantasy, and science fiction. Addison is the first African-American winner of the Bram Stoker Award, which she won six times. The first two awards were for her poetry collections Consumed, Reduced to Beautiful Grey Ashes (2001) and Being Full of Light, Insubstantial (2007). Her poetry and fiction collection How To Recognize A Demon Has Become Your Friend won the 2011 Bram Stoker Award for Superior Achievement in a Poetry Collection. She received a fourth HWA Bram Stoker for the collection The Four Elements, written with Marge Simon, Rain Graves, and Charlee Jacob. Her fifth HWA Bram Stoker was for the collection The Place of Broken Things, written with Alessandro Manzetti. Addison is a founding member of the CITH (Circles in the Hair) writing group.

== Early life ==
Addison was born in Philadelphia, Pennsylvania, on September 8, 1952. She is the eldest of nine children born to Janet Marie Webster (née Warrick) and J. Decarsta Webster. Addison attended Carnegie Mellon University in Pittsburgh, Pennsylvania, from 1970 to 1975, graduating with a Bachelor of Science degree in Mathematics.

She moved to New York City in 1975 with fiancé Ken Addison, and started working in the Foreign Royalty Accounting Department at RCA Records. The couple married in 1975 and their son Brian was born in 1982.

== Career ==
In 1996, Addison's short story "Little Red in the Hood" was published in Tomorrow Speculative Fiction and was listed as an Honorable Mention in the annual Year's Best Fantasy and Horror anthology (1997).

During her time at Carnegie Mellon, Addison became a fan of science-fiction author Isaac Asimov and began regularly submitting short stories for publication to Asimov's Science Fiction magazine. Science fiction author and editor Frederik Pohl advised that in order to get published in science fiction "everyone has to write a how the dinosaurs died story." Addison took the advice and from a short story drafted a poem entitled "Why the Dinosaurs Died"; it was published in Asimov's Science Fiction in 1997. She went on to be published four times in Asimov's magazine between 1997 and 1999.

In 1997, she published her first science fiction, fantasy and horror collection of short stories, journal entries and poetry entitled Animated Objects, which features an introduction by science fiction and fantasy writer Barry N. Malzberg.

African-American editor Sheree Thomas put the call out for African-American speculative fiction writers to submit for a collection that became the groundbreaking anthology: Dark Matter: A Century of Speculative Fiction From the African Diaspora. Addison's work was featured along with that of Octavia E. Butler, Samuel Delaney, Tananarive Due and Walter Mosley. Addison went on to be included in Dark Dreams and Dark Thirst.

Addison created the Bram Stoker Award-winning poetry collection Consumed, Reduced to Beautiful Grey Ashes. Addison was the first African American to win this award. The first book signing for this collection was held on September 11, 2001, at the Barnes & Noble at Rockefeller Center.

In 2007, her third book of poetry and second Bram Stoker Award-winning collection was released: Being Full of Light, Insubstantial. It was inspired by her mother's Alzheimer's disease diagnosis. She describes the experience "as something she had never felt before, it was as if a voice came to her in meditation and gently whispered... 100 poems." The collection was an amalgamation of reprints and new poetry. Addison completed her "100th poem" on March 14, 2007.

Addison is a member of the Horror Writers Association (HWA) and has participated in panels with Harlan Ellison, Jack Ketchum and L. A. Banks. She was "Poet Guest of Honor" at The World Horror Convention in 2005. Addison has participated in Ellen Datlow's Fantastic Fiction Reading Series at KGB Bar in New York City.

Her writing has been featured in Essence Magazine, and she is currently poetry editor for Space and Time Magazine.

In March 2012, Addison won her third Bram Stoker Award for How To Recognize A Demon Has Become Your Friend, a collection of reprints, new poems and short stories. In 2013, she won her fourth HWA Bram Stoker for The Four Elements, a collection of poetry inspired by the four elements released in 2012, and published by Bad Moon Books. The book was inspired by a discussion between Addison and Houarner about female Bram Stoker Award-winners. Addison contacted three Bram Stoker Award-winning female authors and asked them to choose their "element." Marge Simon (Earth), Rain Graves (Water), Charlee Jacob (Fire) and Addison (Air).

In 2020, she won her fifth HWA Bram Stoker for The Place of Broken Things, a collection of poetry written with Alessandro Manzetti released in 2019, and published by Crystal Lake Publishing. Her story, Shadow Dreams, was published March 2021 by Titan Books in the anthology Black Panther: Tales of Wakanda.

== Personal life ==
Addison separated from Ken Addison in 1992, and her divorce was finalized in 1995. Addison started a relationship with horror fiction writer Gerard Houarner in 1995; they married in 2004 but separated in 2010 and legally divorced in 2015. She currently resides in the Tucson, Arizona, area.

== Awards ==
- Six-time winner of the HWA Bram Stoker Award.
- In 2018, she was given the Horror Writers Association's Lifetime Achievement Award for 2017.
- In 2020, she was designated SFPA Grand Master of Fantastic Poetry.
- In 2026 her poetry collection Everything Endless (written with Jamal Hodge) won the Elgin Award for best full length book.

== Partial bibliography ==
- Animated Objects (1997)
- Consumed, Reduced to Beautiful Grey Ashes (2001), Bram Stoker Award for Best Poetry Collection
- Being Full of Light, Insubstantial (2007), Bram Stoker Award for Best Poetry Collection
- How To Recognize A Demon Has Become Your Friend (2011), Bram Stoker Award for Best Poetry Collection
- Dark Duet (2012), written with Stephen M. Wilson, finalist for Bram Stoker Award for Best Poetry Collection
- The Four Elements, written with Marge Simon, Rain Graves, Charlee Jacobs (2013), Bram Stoker Award for Best Poetry Collection
- Sycorax's Daughters (2017), co-edited with Kinitra Brooks PhD and Susana Morris Phd, finalist for Bram Stoker Award for Best Anthology.
- The Place of Broken Things, written with Alessandro Manzetti (2019), Bram Stoker Award for Best Poetry Collection
- Everything Endless, written with Jamal Hodge (2025), Bram Stoker Award for Best Poetry Collection.
