= Bram Stoker Award for Best Alternative Forms =

The Bram Stoker Award for Best Alternative Forms is a discontinued award presented by the Horror Writers Association (HWA) for "superior achievement" in horror writing in alternative media.

== Winners and nominees ==
This category was previously titled "other media". Nominees are listed below the winner(s) for each year.

=== Other Media (1993–2000) ===
Bram Stoker Award for Other Media winners and shortlists
Year	Title	Creator	Media Type	Result	Ref.
1993	Jonah Hex: Two-Gun Mojo	Joe R. Lansdale		Winner	
1993	The Seventh Guest	Matthew J. Costello		Shortlist	
1993	Jurassic Park	Michael Crichton and David Koepp	Screenplay	Shortlist	
1993	Hellblazer	Garth Ennis		Shortlist	
1993	The Sandman	Neil Gaiman	Comic book	Shortlist	
1998	No winner				
1998	Universal Horror	Kevin Brownlow	TV documentary	Shortlist	
1998	The Misfits: American Psycho	John Cafiero	Music video	Shortlist	
1998	Vampires	John Carpenter	Original motion picture sound track	Shortlist	
1998	Gothic at Midnight: A Tribute to the Masters of the Macabre	Joshua Kane	Audio anthology	Shortlist	
1999	"I Have No Mouth and I Must Scream"	Harlan Ellison	Audio	Winner	
1999	Conspiracies	WyrdSisterS ProductionS	Audio CD of F. Paul Wilson story	Shortlist	
1999	Masters of Terror	Andy Fairclough	Website	Shortlist	
1999	Gothic Net	Seth Lindberg	Website	Shortlist	
2000	Chiaroscuro	Steve Eller, Sandra Kasturi, Patricia Lee Macomber, and Brett Alexander Savory (eds.)	Website	Winner	
2000	Twilight Tales Reading Series	Tina L. Jens and Andrea Dubnick (prods.)		Shortlist	
2000	Gothic.Net	Darren McKeeman and Mehitobel Wilson (eds.)	Website	Shortlist	
2000	"Back to the Black Lagoon"	David J. Skal	on The Creature from the Black Lagoon DVD	Shortlist	

=== Alternative Forms ===
Bram Stoker Award for Alternative Forms winners and shortlists
Year	Title	Creator	Media Type	Result	Ref.
2001	Dark Dreamers: Facing the Masters of Fear	Beth Gwinn and Stanley Wiater		Winner	
2001	Horrorfind	Brian Keene and Mike Roden	Internet magazine	Shortlist	
2001	Unseen Masters	Bruce Ballon	Gaming module	Shortlist	
2001	Rue Morgue	Rod Gudino (ed.)	Magazine	Shortlist	
2001	Gothic.net	Darren McKeeman (ed.)	Internet magazine	Shortlist	
2002	Imagination Box	Steve Tem and Melanie Tem	Multimedia CD	Winner	
2002	Buckeye Jim in Egypt	Mort Castle	Audio script based on the Mort Castle story	Shortlist	
2002	Flesh and Blood	Jack Fisher (ed.)	Magazine	Shortlist	
2002	The Tree Is My Hat	Lawrence Santoro	Audio script based on Gene Wolfe's story	Shortlist	
2003	The Goreletter	Michael Arnzen	Email newsletter	Winner	
2003	From the Files of Matthew Gentech	Bruce Ballon	Role-playing game	Shortlist	
2003	Ghosts of Albion	Christopher Golden and Amber Benson	Webcast script	Shortlist	
2003	Horror World	Nanci Kalanta and Ron Dickie (eds.)	Webzine	Shortlist	
2004	The Devil's Wine	Tom Piccirilli (ed.)		Winner	
2004	The Goreletter	Michael Arnzen		Shortlist	
2004	Flesh & Blood	Jack Fisher (ed.)	Magazine	Shortlist	
2004	ChiZine	Brett Savory (ed.)		Shortlist	
