= World Horror Convention =

Annual professional gathering

- Status: Defunct
- Genre: Horror
- Location: Varies
- Country: Varies
- Inaugurated: 1991
- Most recent: 2016
- Attendance: 400-500
- Organizer: World Horror Society
- Website: worldhorrorconvention.com

The World Horror Convention was an annual professional gathering of the World Horror Society and other interested parties that ran annually for 26 years, from 1991 through 2016, before being discontinued.

== Site selection ==
The annual World Horror Conventions were held mostly in the United States or Canada, frequently alternating between the east and west sides of North America. In 2010, the convention was held outside North America for the first and only time, in Brighton, England.

The bids from potential committees were presented to the members of the board of directors of the World Horror Society, who then decided where future conventions would be held. Bids were usually made two years before the specific year (e.g., bids for 2001 were considered in 1999). The Horror Writers Association's Bram Stoker Award ceremony was held in conjunction with the convention for many years, but the HWA now stages the ceremony at its own event, the Bram Stoker Awards Weekend. The World Horror Convention Grand Master Award was given most years, until the World Horror Convention was discontinued in favor of the annual Bram Stoker Awards Weekend.

== Conventions ==
source:Past World Horror Conventions

Dates	Location	Info
1991	Nashville, Tennessee	Writer: Chelsea Quinn Yarbro. Artist: Jill Bauman. MC: David J. Schow, John Skipp, Craig Spector, Richard Christian Matheson. Grand Master: Robert Bloch.
1992	Nashville, Tennessee	Writer: Richard Matheson. Artist: Harry O. Morris. Special media guest: Richard Christian Matheson. MC: Brian Lumley. Grand Master: Stephen King.
1993	Stamford, Connecticut	Writers: Peter Straub, Les Daniels. Artist: Stephen Gervais. Special media guests: Paul Clemens. MC: Stanley Wiater. Grand Master: Richard Matheson.
1994	Phoenix, Arizona	Writers: Charles L. Grant, Dan Simmons. Artist: Gahan Wilson. MC: Edward Bryant. Grand Master: Anne Rice.
1995	Atlanta	Writers: John Farris, Neil Gaiman, R. L. Stine. Artist: Alan M. Clark. Media: Alice Cooper. MC: Brian Lumley. Grand Master: Clive Barker.
1996	Eugene, Oregon	Writers: Clive Barker, Charles de Lint, Nina Kiriki Hoffman, Don Maitz, Janny Wurts. Special: Tim Powers, Edward Bryant. Grand Master: Dean Koontz.
1997	Niagara Falls, New York	Writers: Ramsey Campbell, Poppy Z. Brite, Joe R. Lansdale. Artist: Rick Berry. Media: Gunnar Hansen. Editor: Darrell Schweitzer. MC: Edo van Belkom. Grand Master: Peter Straub.
1998	Phoenix, Arizona	Writer: Brian Lumley. Artist: Bernie Wrightson. Media: Tom Savini. Publisher: Tom Doherty. MC: John Steakley. Grand Master: Brian Lumley.
1999	Atlanta	Writers: Michael Bishop, John Shirley. Artist: Lisa Snellings. MC: Neil Gaiman. Grand Master: Ramsey Campbell.
2000	Denver	Writers: Peter Straub, Melanie Tem, Steve Rasnic Tem, J. Michael Straczynski, Graham Joyce. Artist: Rick Lieder. Editor: Ellen Datlow. MC: Dan Simmons. Grand Master: Harlan Ellison.
2001	Seattle	In conjunction with the Horror Writers Association Bram Stoker Awards Weekend. Guest of Honor in Memoriam: Richard Laymon. Writers: Simon Clark, Michael Slade, Jessica Amanda Salmonson. Artist: Charles Vess. Publishers: Barbara Roden, Christopher Roden. Grand Master: Ray Bradbury.
2002	Chicago	Writers: Gene Wolfe, Neil Gaiman. Editor: Melissa Ann Singer. Artist: Randy Broecker. Poetry: Jo Fletcher. Photography: Beth Gwinn. Music: Liz Mandville Greeson. Comics and Young Adult: Jill Thompson. Media: Rich Koz, Patricia Tallman, Robert Z'Dar. Special: Karen E. Taylor, Yvonne Navarro, Brian A. Hopkins. Grand Master: Charles L. Grant.
2003	Kansas City, Missouri	Writer: Brian A. Hopkins. Publisher: Don D'Auria. Artist: Nick Smith. Special: Forrest J. Ackerman. MC: Laurell K. Hamilton. Grand Master: Chelsea Quinn Yarbro.
2004	Phoenix, Arizona	Writer: Douglas Clegg. Artist: Jeremy Caniglia. Editor: Stephen Jones. Media: Dee Snider. Special: Adam Niswander. Grand Master: Jack Williamson.
2005	New York City	Writers: Harlan Ellison, Joe R. Lansdale, Tim Lebbon, Tom Piccirilli, Jack Ketchum, Mort Castle, Amber Benson. Filmmaker: Mick Garris. Artist: Allen Koszowski. Editors: Tom, Elizabeth Monteleone. MCs: Stan Wiater, Linda Addison
2006	San Francisco	Writers: Kim Newman, Koji Suzuki. Toastmaster: Peter Straub. Artist: Brom. Media: Bill Moseley. Editor: John Pelan.
2007	Toronto	Writers: Michael Marshall Smith, Nancy Kilpatrick. Artist: John Picacio. Editors: Peter Crowther, Don Hutchison. Media: Peter Atkins.
2008	Salt Lake City	Writer: Dennis Etchison. Artist: John Jude Palencar. Toastmaster: Simon Clark. Academic: Michael R. Collings. Special: Jeff Strand, Dave Dinsmore.
2009	Winnipeg	Writers: Conrad Williams, Edo van Belkom, F. Paul Wilson, Joshua Gee. Artist: Tommy Castillo. Grand Master: Tanith Lee.
2010	Brighton	Writers: Tanith Lee, David Case. Editor: Hugh Lamb. Artists: Les Edwards, Dave Carson. Special: James Herbert. MC: Jo Fletcher. Media: Ingrid Pitt. WHS Lifetime Achievement Award: William F. Nolan, Basil Copper. Grand Master: James Herbert.
2011	Austin, Texas	Writers: Sarah Langan, Joe Hill. Media: Steve Niles. Editors: Brett Alexander Savory, Sandra Kasturi. Artist: Vincent Chong. Toastmaster: Joe R. Lansdale. Special: Brian Keene, Del Howison. Grand Master: Jack Ketchum.
2012	Salt Lake City	Writer: Sherrilyn Kenyon. Artist: Mike Mignola. Special: Rocky Wood. HWA guests of honor: Joe R. Lansdale, Karen Lansdale, Robert McCammon. Toastmistress: P. N. Elrod. HWA special guests: Dacre Stoker, Jeff Strand. Grand Master: T. E. D. Klein.
2013	New Orleans	In conjunction with the HWA Bram Stoker Awards Weekend. Writers: Ramsey Campbell, Caitlin R. Kiernan, Jonathan Maberry. Artist: Glenn Chadbourne. Editor: John Joseph Adams. Poet: Bruce Boston. Toastmaster: Jeff Strand.
2014	Portland, Oregon	Writers: Nancy Holder, Jack Ketchum, Norman Partridge. Artist: Gret Staples. Editor: Paula Guran. Grand Master: Brian Keene. HWA Lifetime Achievement Awards: Stephen Jones, R. L. Stine. Ghost of Honor: Edward Gorey. Special: Victoria Price, John Shirley. Toastmaster: Alan M. Clark.
2015	Atlanta	Writers: Lisa Tuttle, Christopher Golden, Tom Piccirilli, John Farris, Kami Garcia, Charlaine Harris. Artist: Bob Eggleton. Editor: Chris Ryall. Grand Master: William F. Nolan. Toastmaster: Jonathan Maberry.
April 28 - May 1, 2016	Provo Marriott Hotel and Convention Center; Provo, Utah	Writers: Sarah Pinborough, Joe McKinney, Kevin J. Anderson, Darren Shan. Artist: Keith Thompson. Academic: Michael R. Collings. Special: Linda Addison, Jason V. Brock, Sunni Brock, Michaelbrent Collings, Michael Arnzen, Victoria Price, Dan Wells, Carter Reid. Ghost of Honor: Shirley Jackson.
