= Stephanie M. Wytovich =

American editor, novelist and poet

- Born: c. 1989
- Education: Seton Hill University (BA, MFA)

Stephanie M. Wytovich (/waɪˈtoʊvɪtʃ/ wye-TOH-vitch; born c. 1989) is an American editor, novelist and poet working in the horror genre.

== Life and career ==
Stephanie M. Wytovich is from Pittsburgh, Pennsylvania. She graduated from Seton Hill University initially with her BA in English literature and art history before also completing an MFA in writing popular fiction. Wytovich works at Western Connecticut State University, Point Park University and Southern New Hampshire University. Wytovich also works as a book reviewer for Nameless Magazine and as poetry editor for Raw Dog Screaming Press. She writes horror novels and poetry and has been published in a number of magazines including Pedestal magazine and The Horror Zine. Her work has been collected in a number of books. She is a member of the Science Fiction Poetry Association and the Horror Writers Association.

Wytovich won the 2017 Bram Stoker Award for her collection Brothel. Her work has been nominated almost every year since 2014. In 2017 Wytovich won the Rocky Wood Memorial Scholarship for Non-Fiction.

== Bibliography ==
=== Novels ===
- The Eighth (2016) – ISBN 978-1626411920

=== Collections ===
- Hysteria: A Collection of Madness (2013) – ISBN 978-1935738497
- Mourning Jewelry (2014) – ISBN 978-1935738633
- An Exorcism of Angels (2015) – ISBN 978-1935738725
- Brothel (2016) – ISBN 978-1935738831
- Sheet Music to My Acoustic Nightmare (2017) – ISBN 978-1947879003
- The Apocalyptic Mannequin (2019) – ISBN 978-1947879133

=== Anthologies, as editor ===
==== HWA Poetry Showcase ====
- Poetry Showcase: Volume V (2018)
- Poetry Showcase: Volume VI (2019)
- Poetry Showcase: Volume VII (2020)
- Poetry Showcase: Volume VIII (2021)

=== Anthologies, as contributor ===
- The Best Horror of the Year: Volume 8 (2016)
  - "The 21st Century Shadow" (poem)
- Year's Best Hardcore Horror: Volume 2 (2017)
  - Select poems from Brothel
  - "On This Side of Bloodletting" (short fiction)
- Fantastic Tales of Terror (2018)
  - "The Girl with the Death Mask" (short fiction)
- Tales from the Lake: Volume 5 (2018)
  - "From the Mouths of Plague-Mongers" (poem)
  - "The Monster Told Me To" (short fiction)
- Miscreations: Gods, Monstrosities & Other Horrors (2020)
  - "A Benediction of Corpses" (short fiction)
- Attack from the '80s (2021)
  - "Mother Knows Best" (short fiction)

=== Short fiction ===
- "Vines Are in Her Wardrobe" (2015)
- "On This Side of Bloodletting" (2016)
- "The Girl with the Death Mask" (2018)
- "The Monster Told Me To" (2018)
- "A Benediction of Corpses" (2020)
- "Mother Knows Best" (2021)

== Awards ==
=== Literary awards ===
Award	Category	Year	Nominated work	Result	Ref
Bram Stoker Awards	BSA–First Novel	2017	The Eighth	Nominated	
Bram Stoker Awards	BSA–Poetry Collection	2014	Hysteria: A Collection of Madness	Nominated	
Bram Stoker Awards	BSA–Poetry Collection	2015	Mourning Jewelry	Nominated	
Bram Stoker Awards	BSA–Poetry Collection	2016	An Exorcism of Angels	Nominated	
Bram Stoker Awards	BSA–Poetry Collection	2017	Brothel	Won	
Bram Stoker Awards	BSA–Poetry Collection	2018	Sheet Music to My Acoustic Nightmare	Nominated	
Bram Stoker Awards	BSA–Poetry Collection	2020	The Apocalyptic Mannequin	Nominated	
Elgin Awards	Best Poetry Book	2015	Mourning Jewelry	Nominated	

=== Other honors ===
- Horror Writers Association Rocky Wood Memorial Scholarship for Non-Fiction (2017) (co-winner)
