= Rain Graves =

American author (born 1974)

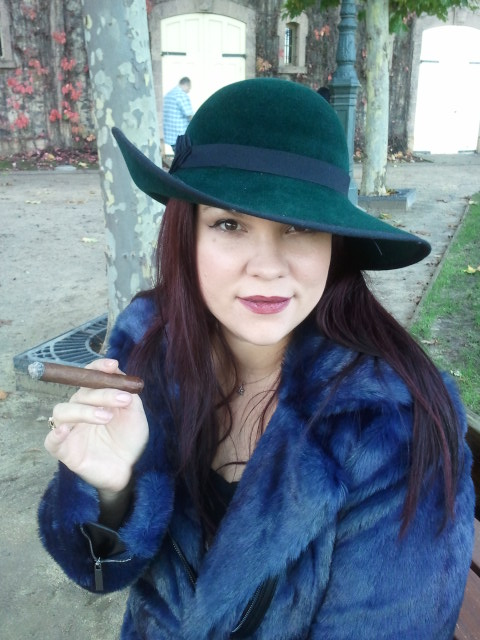
- Rain Graves, at Inglenook
- Born: October 28, 1974 (age 51); Washington D.C., U.S.
- Occupations: Author, Poet
- Writing career
- Period: 1997 – current
- Genres: Horror fiction, science fiction, poetry
- Website: www.raingraves.com

Rain Graves is an author of horror, fantasy, science fiction and poetry. She is also a noted Wine Poet, commissioned and featured by winemakers and wineries, and the Creator and Hostess of the Haunted Mansion Writer's Retreat.

She is the 2002 Bram Stoker Award winner for Best Poetry Collection, The Gossamer Eye (along with Mark McLaughlin and David Niall Wilson), and the 2013 winner of the Bram Stoker Award for Superior Achievement in Poetry along with Linda Addison, Charlee Jacob, and Marge Simon for "The Four Elements". Her first published story, "Thoughts of Anna," (Transylvanian Society of Dracula, 1997) won 2nd place for the creative writing contest at the convention Dracula 97. Rain currently lives in San Francisco and tours the country doing spoken word events. Critics have often had trouble categorizing her poetry as genre or non-genre; Publishers Weekly described her work on January 19, 2009, as "Bukowski meets Lovecraft..."

== Selected bibliography ==
=== Books ===
- Four Elements by Marge Simon, Rain Graves, Charlee Jacob, and Linda Addison (Bad Moon Books - 2013)
- "The Haunted Mansion Project: Year Two" (edited by Loren Rhoads, Presented by Rain Graves) (Damnation Books, 2013) Introduction, Non-Fiction, Poetry, and Fiction
- The Haunted Mansion Project: Year One (edited by E.S. Magill, Presented by Rain Graves) (Damnation Books – 2011) Introduction, Non-Fiction, Poetry, and Fiction.
- Barfodder: Poetry Written in Dark Bars and Questionable Cafes (Cemetery Dance Publications – 2009) 2nd Printing, (Cemetery Dance Publications – 2011)
- The Gossamer Eye (with David N. Wilson and Mark McLaughlin) (Meisha Merlin – 2002)

=== Anthologies ===
Graves' short fiction appears in numerous anthologies:

- "High Stakes" edited by Gabrielle Faust (Evil Jester Press, 2013) Featuring "Bonesong"
- "Zombies vs. Robots: Women on War!" Edited by Jeff Conner (IDW Publishing 2012) -- Featuring "The Meek Shall Inherit The Earth"
- "Tales From the House Band: Volume 2" edited by Deborah Grabien (Plus One Press, 2012) -- Featuring "Star Light, Star Bright"
- Tales From the House Band edited by Deborah Grabien (Plus One Press, 2011) – Featuring "Vampire Fiction"
- In Laymon's Terms: A Tribute To Richard Laymon edited by Kelly Laymon, Steve Gerlach, Richard Chizmar (Cemetery Dance Publications, 2011) – Featuring "Wild Card"
- Dark Faith edited by Maurice Broaddus (Apex Books, 2010) – Featuring "Lilith"
- The Dead Cat Poet Cabal edited by Gerard Houarner (Bedlam Press, 2005) – Featuring "Stalking Dead Cat"
- Once Upon a Slime: Gruesome Tales by Mark McLaughlin, with Special Guests: Michael Arnzen, Rain Graves, & Michael McCarty (Catalyst Press, 2003) – Featuring "Old Lady Cat Trash"
- Bad News edited by Richard Laymon (Cemetery Dance Publications, 2001) – Featuring "Lila Came A Walkin"
- The Book of Hope: International Poetry in a collective voice of Hope edited by Birgitta Jonsdottir, Michael Lohr (Beyond Borders, 2002)
- The World Healing Book edited by Birgitta Jonsdottir, Michael Lohr (Beyond Borders, 2002)
- The Year's Best Fantasy & Horror vol. 14 edited by Ellen Datlow, Terri Windling (St. Martin's Griffin, 2001) – Honorable Mention "The Drunkard's Coin"
- Excitable Boys (Nightshade Books),
- Decadence (Prime)
- Daughter of Dangerous Dames edited by Tina Jens, (TwilightTales, 2000) – Featuring "The Drunkard's Coin"
- Freaks, Geeks, & Sideshow Floozies edited by Tina Jens & John Weagly (Twilight Tales, 2002) – Featuring "The Magician's Assistant"
- Darkness Rising (Cosmo Books),
- Hours of Darkness (Scorpius Digital),
- Personal Demons (LoneWolf),
- The Gauntlet Sampler (Gauntlet Press)
- Blood of a Black Bird – chapbook

== General references ==
- Horror Writer's Association Website with Bram Stoker Award Winners
- The Haunted Mansion Writer's Retreat
