= Sharon Baker =

American novelist (1938–1991)

- Born: May 10, 1938; San Francisco, California, United States
- Died: June 4, 1991; Seattle, Washington, United States
- Writing career
- Period: 1983–1991
- Genre: Science fiction
- Notable work: The Naphar series

Sharon Baker (1938–1991) was a science fiction writer, author of the Naphar trilogy.

== Biography ==
Baker was born on May 10, 1938, in San Francisco, daughter of Frank and Margaret Sklensky. She earned a BA from Mills College in 1960 and a master's degree in Libranianship from the University of Washington in 1966. Her husband, Gordon P. Baker, was a doctor. She had four sons, Seth, Eliot, Brett, and Jason. Baker began her writing life during a period when she was responsible to drive her four sons to their four schools every day. "I felt like a car appliance," she said in an interview with Gale Contemporary Authors, "[and] to remind myself that I was not, I signed up for a weekly writing class." As her career continued, she developed a hands-on research style for her books, typified by this anecdote: "Since Quarreling's hero was a slave, I talked to street kids who sold themselves to live. I was so touched by these boys' plight ... my hero became one of them." Critical reactions to her work could sting, but Baker was outspoken about not giving up: "[O]n good days, I no longer feel like an appendage of my station wagon or anything else. I feel like me. And I like it." Baker died in Seattle on June 4, 1991. The Sharon Baker Memorial Award was for a time administrated by the Pacific Northwest Writers Association.

== Themes and critical response ==
The first book of the Naphar series, Quarreling, They Met The Dragon, won second prize in the Pacific Northwest Writers Conference Novel Contest in 1982, though the novel did not earn universal praise: writing for Library Journal, Jackie Cassada noted, "The strong emphasis on sex unfortunately fails to mesh comfortably with the story's plot." Mary Turzillo, writing in the 1988 edition of Science Fiction and Fantasy Book Review Annual, begins her review of the second book in the series (Journey to Membliar) with, "This is not a perfect book." Some critique aside, however, the review is on the whole positive. "I wouldn't want to live on Naphar," Turzillo says, "but I recommend the vicarious pleasure of Sharon Baker's narrative about its society." Turzillo considered that the second book of the series outperformed the first, that "the themes of betrayal and loss are powerful," and that Baker's "growth as an artist suggests high promise." Turzillo compared Baker's poetic writing style to that of British sci-fi writer Tanith Lee. Writing in the New York Review of Science Fiction, Brian Stableford's longform review of the second and third installments of the Naphar series concludes its lengthy deliberations over Baker's combining of science fiction and fantasy elements with: "By virtue of importing and carefully developing the skeptical sciencefictional viewpoint within the emotionally-charged fantasy of self-development, [Baker] attains a particular blend of the two which does benefit from a kind of literary synergy."

== Bibliography ==
- Quarreling, They Met The Dragon (1984) ISBN 0-380-89201-4
- Journey to Membliar (1987) ISBN 0-380-75114-3
- Burning Tears of Sassurum (1988) ISBN 0-380-75113-5
