= Bruce Boston =

American writer (1943–2024)

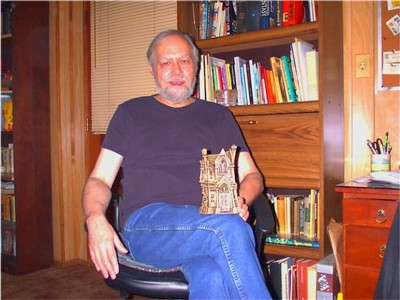
- With Bram Stoker Award, 2004
- Born: July 16, 1943; Chicago, Illinois, U.S.
- Died: November 11, 2024 (aged 81)
- Education: University of California, Berkeley (BA, MA)
- Occupations: Writer, poet
- Spouse: Marge Simon (m. 2001)
- Writing career
- Genre: Speculative fiction

Bruce Boston (July 16, 1943 – November 11, 2024) was an American speculative fiction writer and poet.

== Early years ==
Boston was born in Chicago and grew up in Southern California. He received a B.A. in economics from the University of California, Berkeley in 1965, and an M.A. in 1967. He lived in the San Francisco Bay Area from 1961 to 2001, where he worked in a variety of occupations, including computer programmer, college professor (literature and creative writing, John F. Kennedy University, Orinda, California, 1978–82), technical writer, book designer, gardener, movie projectionist, retail clerk, and furniture mover.

According to Boston, he meant to major in math at university and write on the side, but soon found that he was more interested in writing. After being advised by a friend that he should not major in English to become a writer, he decided on economics instead.

== Writing career ==
Boston has won the Rhysling Award for speculative poetry a record seven times, and the Asimov's Readers' Award for poetry a record seven times. He has also received a Pushcart Prize for fiction, 1976, a record four Bram Stoker Awards for solo poetry collections, and the first Grand Master Award of the Science Fiction Poetry Association, 1999. His collaborative poem with Robert Frazier, "Return to the Mutant Rain Forest," received first place in the 2006 Locus Online Poetry Poll for Best All-Time Science Fiction, Fantasy, or Horror Poem.

Boston's first two short story collections, Jackbird (1976) and She Comes When You're Leaving & Other Stories (1982) were published by Berkeley Poets' Workshop and Press. BPW&P was run by the Berkeley Poets' Cooperative, whose writing workshops Boston attended in the 1970s after meeting Co-op cofounder Charles Entrekin when they were both working as computer analysts for Pacific Telephone.

Boston has also published more than a hundred short stories and the novels Stained Glass Rain and The Guardener's Tale (the latter a Bram Stoker Award Finalist and Prometheus Award Nominee). His work has appeared widely in periodicals and anthologies, including Asimov's SF Magazine, Amazing Stories Magazine, Analog Science Fiction, Realms of Fantasy, Science Fiction Age, Weird Tales, Strange Horizons, Year's Best Fantasy and Horror, and the Nebula Awards Showcase. Writing in The Washington Post, Paul Di Filippo described his collection Masque of Dreams as containing "nearly two dozen brilliant stories ranging across all emotional and narrative terrains."

Boston has chaired the Nebula Award Novel Jury (SFWA), the Bram Stoker Award Novel Jury, and the Philip K. Dick Award Jury, and served as Secretary and Treasurer of the Science Fiction Poetry Association. He has served as fiction and/or poetry editor for a number of publications, including Occident, The Open Cell, Berkeley Poets Cooperative, City Miner, Star*Line and The Pedestal Magazine.

He was the poet guest of honor at the World Horror Convention in 2013.

== Personal life ==
Boston lived in Ocala, Florida, with his wife, writer-artist Marge Simon, whom he married in 2001.

== Bibliography ==
=== Novels ===
- Stained glass rain. Denver: Ocean View Books. 1993.
  - Stained glass rain. Reprint. Doylestown, Pennsylvania: Wildside Press. 2003.
- The Guardener's tale. Signed, limited ed. Sam's Dot Publishing. 2007.
  - The Guardener's tale. 2nd ed. Sam's Dot Publishing. 2011.
  - El Guardián de Almas, Spanish-language edition of The Guardener's Tale, La Factoria de Ideas, 2009
  - The Guardener's tale. ebook ed. Independent Legions. 2021.

=== Short fiction ===
Collections

- Jackbird. BPW&P, 1976
- She Comes When You're Leaving. BPW&P, 1982
- Skin Trades, Chris Drumm, 1988
- Hypertales & Metafictions. Chris Drumm, 1990
- All the Clocks Are Melting (single story booklet), Pulphouse Publishing, 1991
- Night Eyes. Chris Drumm, 1993
- Dark Tales & Light. Dark Regions, 1999
- Masque of Dreams, Wildside, 2001, 2009
- Bruce Boston: Short Stories, Volume 1 (ebook), Fictionwise, 2003
- Bruce Boston: Short Stories, Volume 2 (ebook), Fictionwise, 2003
- Flashing the Dark. Sam's Dot Publishing, 2006
- Gallimaufry. Plum White Press, 2021, 2nd edition, Mind's Eye Publications, 2023

Stories (Note: Short stories unless otherwise noted.)

Title	Year	First published	Reprinted/collected	Notes
After magic	1990	Eotu	Dark Regions (1999)	Novelette
Houses	1991	Talisman		Novelette

=== Poetry ===
Collections

- XXO. Maya Press, 1969
- Potted Poems. Maya Press, 1970
- All the Clock Are Melting. Velocities, 1984
- Alchemical Texts. Ocean View, 1985
- Nuclear Futures. Velocities, 1987
- Time. Titan, 1988
- The Nightmare Collector. 2AM Publications, 1989
- Faces of the Beast. Starmont House, 1990
- Other Voices, Other Worlds (audio tape, music by Jack Poley). Chris Drumm, 1990, (MP3 audio) Telltale Weekly, 2004
- Short Circuits (prose poems). Ocean View, 1991
- Cybertexts. Talisman, 1991
- Frazier, Robert & Bruce Boston (1992). Chronicles of the mutant rain forest. Introduction by Lucius Shepard; cover by Robert Frazier. Horror's Head Press.
- Accursed Wives. Night Visions, 1993
- Specula: Selected Uncollected Poems, 1968-1993. Talisman, 1993
- Sensuous Debris: Selected Poems, 1970-1995. Dark Regions, 1995
- Conditions of Sentient Life. Gothic Press, 1996
- Cold Tomorrows. Gothic Press, 1998
- The Complete Accursed Wives, Talisman/Dark Regions, 2000 (Note: Includes short stories.)
- White Space. Dark Regions, 2001
- Quanta: Award Winning Poems. Miniature Sun, 2001
- Night Smoke (ebook, with Marge Simon), Miniature Sun & Quixsilver, 2002
- Head Full of Strange (ebook). CyberPulp, 2003
- Pitchblende. Dark Regions, 2003
- Etiquette with Your Robot Wife. Talisman, 2005
- Shades Fantastic. Gromagon Press, 2006
- Night Smoke (with Marge Simon, expanded print edition of 2002 ebook). Kelp Queen Press, 2007
- The Nightmare Collection. Dark Regions, 2008
- Double Visions (collaborative poems). Dark Regions, 2009
- North Left of Earth. Sam's Dot, 2009
- Dark Matters. Bad Moon Books, 2010
- Surrealities. Dark Regions, 2011
- Anthropomorphisms. Elektrik Milk Bath Press, 2012
- Notes from the Shadow City (with Gary William Crawford). Dark Regions, 2012
- Dark Roads: Selected Long Poems 1971-2012. Dark Renaissance Books, 2013
- Resonance Dark & Light. Eldritch Press, 2015
- Sacrificial Nights (with Alessandro Manzetti). Kipple Officina Libraria, 2016
- Brief Encounters with My Third Eye: Selected Short Poems 1975-2016. Crystal Lake Publishing, 2016, Korean-language edition, Philyohanchaek, 2021
- Visions of the Mutant Rain Forest (with Robert Frazier), Crystal Lake Publishing, 2017
- Artifacts. Independent Legions, 2018
- Spacers Snarled in the Hair of Comets. Mind's Eye Publications, 2022

Broadsides and chapbooks

- Musings. Eldritch Emu Press, 1988
- The Last Existentialist. Chris Drumm, 1993
- Confessions of a Body Thief. Talisman, 1998
- The Lesions of Genetic Sin. Miniature Sun, 2000
- Pavane for a Cyber-Princess (single poem chapbook). Miniature Sun, 2001
- In Far Pale Clarity. Quixsilver, 2002
- She Was There for Him the Last Time (single poem chapbook). Miniature Sun, 2002
- The Crow Is Dismantled in Flight (ebroadside). Miniature Sun, 2003

List of poems

Title	Year	First published	Reprinted/collected
Birth of an astrophysicist	2015	Boston, Bruce (April–May 2015). "Birth of an astrophysicist". Asimov's Science Fiction. 39 (4–5): 53.	
Tourists from the future	2015	Boston, Bruce (June 2015). "Tourists from the future". Asimov's Science Fiction. 39 (6): 31.	

———————

== Major awards and honors ==
=== Bram Stoker Award for Poetry Collection ===
- 2003 Pitchblende, Dark Regions Press
- 2006 Shades Fantastic, Gromagon Press
- 2008 The Nightmare Collection, Dark Regions Press
- 2010 Dark Matters, Bad Moon Books

=== Asimov’s Readers Award for Poetry ===
- 1989 Old Robots Are the Worst
- 1993 Curse of the Shapeshifter's Wife
- 1997 Curse of the SF Writer's Wife
- 2003 Eight Things Not to Do or Say When a Mad Scientist Moves into Your Neighborhood
- 2005 Heavy Weather
- 2007 The Dimensional Rush of Relative Primes
- 2014 In the Quiet Hour

=== Rhysling Award for Speculative Poetry (SFPA) ===
- 1985 For Spacers Snarled in the Hair of Comets, short
- 1987 The Nightmare Collector, short
- 1988 In the Darkened Hours, long
- 1994 Spacer's Compass, short
- 1995 Future Present: A Lesson in Expectation, short
- 1999 Confessions of a Body Thief, long
- 2001 My Wife Returns as She Would Have It, short

=== Others ===
- 1973 Yaddo Colony Fellow
- 1976 Pushcart Prize for Fiction for “Broken Portraiture”
- 1999 Grand Master Award, Science Fiction Poetry Association
- 2006 Winner of Locus Poll for All-Time Favorite SF/F/H Poem, Return to the Mutant Rain Forest" with Robert Frazier
- 2013 Poet Guest of Honor, World Horror/Bram Stoker Awards Convention, New Orleans
- 2023 Dwarf Stars Award, Science Fiction Poetry Association for "In Perpetuity"
