= Angela Yuriko Smith =

American writer and publisher

- Occupations: Writer and publisher
- Awards: Bram Stoker Award for Best Poetry Collection; Bram Stoker Award for Best Short Non-Fiction
- Website: angelaysmith.com

Angela Yuriko Smith is a Ryukyuan-American (also described as Shimanchu-American) writer and publisher. Her publishing house is named Yuriko, which was her grandmother's given name. She has won two Bram Stoker Awards.

As of 2025, she is president of the international Horror Writers Association.

== Writing ==
Smith's 2024 novel Inujini (ISBN 979-8884457614) is a fictionalized account of events around the Battle of Okinawa.

Her 2024 book How to Be an Authortunist (ISBN 9781959048183) has been described as "a catchy, creative how-to on writing and publishing".

== Awards ==
Smith's Tortured Willows: Bent. Bowed. Unbroken., co-authored with Geneve Flynn, Lee Murray, and Christina Sng, won the 2021 Bram Stoker Award for Best Poetry Collection.

She won the 2021 Bram Stoker Award for Best Short Non-Fiction for her piece "Horror Writers: Architects of Hope" in issue 55 of The Sirens Call, Halloween 2021.

Her Bitter Suites was nominated for the 2018 Bram Stoker Award for Best Long Fiction, and her Unquiet Spirits: Essays by Asian Women in Horror, co-edited with Lee Murray, was nominated for the 2023 Bram Stoker Award for Best Non-Fiction.
