= Geneve Flynn =

Australian speculative fiction editor, author and poet

- Occupations: Editor, writer, poet
- Writing career
- Genres: Horror; Speculative fiction Poetry
- Notable works: Black Cranes: Tales of Unquiet Women (2020); Tortured Willows: Bent. Bowed. Unbroken. (2021)
- Notable awards: Bram Stoker Award (2020, 2021); Shirley Jackson Award (2020); Aurealis Award (2022); Australasian Shadows Awards (2024

Geneve Flynn is an Australian speculative fiction editor, author and poet. She co-edited the anthology Black Cranes: Tales of Unquiet Women (2020) with Lee Murray, which won the Bram Stoker Award and the Shirley Jackson Award, and contributed to the poetry collection Tortured Willows (2021), which won a second Bram Stoker Award.

== Background ==
Flynn is of Chinese-Malaysian heritage and her family lived in several countries during her childhood.

== Career ==
=== Editing ===
Black Cranes: Tales of Unquiet Women, co-edited by Flynn and Murray, was published by Omnium Gatherum in 2020. It won the 2020 Bram Stoker Award for Best Anthology and the 2020 Shirley Jackson Award for Best Edited Anthology, and was a finalist for the British Fantasy Award and the Aurealis Award. Raw Dog Screaming Press announced a hardcover edition in 2022, with an afterword by Nancy Holder.

Flynn was assistant editor of Relics, Wrecks, and Ruins, an anthology created as the legacy of Australian fantasy author Aiki Flinthart in support of the Flinthart Writing Residency at the Queensland Writers Centre.

=== Poetry ===
Tortured Willows: Bent. Bowed. Unbroken., a collaboration with Murray, Christina Sng and Angela Yuriko Smith, was published by Yuriko Publishing in 2021 and extends the themes of Black Cranes. It won the 2021 Bram Stoker Award for Best Poetry Collection and placed second for the Elgin Award for full-length collections. Reviewing the collection for LitReactor, Sara Tantlinger described it as an exploration of Asian identity, resilience and power. In 20224 her work, You Swallowed Your Tongue won the Australasian Shadows Awards poetry prize.

=== Fiction ===
Flynn's short fiction has been published by Flame Tree Publishing, Crystal Lake Publishing, Black Spot Books and PseudoPod. Her story "They Call Me Mother", published in Classic Monsters Unleashed won the 2022 Aurealis Award for Best Horror Short Story; her story "Lidless Eyes that See" was a finalist in the same category.

== Awards and honors ==
Year	Award	Work	Result
2020	Bram Stoker Award, Anthology	Black Cranes (with Lee Murray)	Won
2020	Shirley Jackson Award, Edited Anthology	Black Cranes (with Lee Murray)	Won
2020	British Fantasy Award, Anthology	Black Cranes (with Lee Murray)	Nominated
2020	Aurealis Award, Anthology	Black Cranes (with Lee Murray)	Nominated
2020	Australasian Shadows Awards, Edited Work	Black Cranes (with Lee Murray) Trickster's Treats 4 – Coming, Buried or Not! (edited with Louise Zelda-Sampson)	Nominated
2021	Bram Stoker Award, Poetry Collection	Tortured Willows (with Murray, Sng and Smith)	Won
2021	Elgin Award, Full-length collection	Tortured Willows (with Murray, Sng and Smith)	2nd place
2021	Australasian Shadows Awards, Poetry	When The Girls Began To Fall Guest of Honour	Nominated
2022	Aurealis Award, Horror Short Story	"They Call Me Mother"	Won
2022	Aurealis Award, Horror Short Story	"Lidless Eyes that See"	Nominated
2022	Australasian Shadows Awards, Short Fiction	They Call Me Mother	Nominated
2024	Australasian Shadows Awards, Poetry	You Swallowed Your Tongue (with Lee Murray)	Won

In 2022 she was awarded a Queensland Writers Fellowship as part of the Queensland Literary Awards (with Melissa Ashley and Mary-Rose MacColl).

== Bibliography ==
=== As editor ===
- Black Cranes: Tales of Unquiet Women (with Lee Murray; Omnium Gatherum, 2020)

=== Poetry ===
- Tortured Willows: Bent. Bowed. Unbroken. (with Lee Murray, Christina Sng and Angela Yuriko Smith; Yuriko Publishing, 2021)

=== Selected short fiction ===
- "They Call Me Mother", in Classic Monsters Unleashed, edited by James Aquilone (Crystal Lake Publishing and Black Spot Books, 2022)
- "Lidless Eyes that See", in From the Wasteland (PS Publishing UK, 2022)
