= Bram Stoker Award for Lifetime Achievement =

Horror fiction award

The Bram Stoker Award for Lifetime Achievement annually recognizes one to three living artists for "superior achievement in an entire career" which has "substantially influenced the horror genre". It is conferred by the Horror Writers Association, and most winners have been horror fiction writers, but other creative occupations are eligible.

The Bram Stoker Awards, including the lifetime honor in particular, were established along with the Association itself in 1987. They are presented in the year following the award eligibility year, which is the publication year for most of the awards program.

The winners are selected by the annual Lifetime Achievement Award Committee, which comprises five HWA members appointed by the President. Unlike the literary awards, which are determined by vote of all members, there are no official runners-up.

== Recipients ==
The annual committee may bestow up to three awards, by unanimous agreement, and it need not bestow any. In fact, though, there has been at least a single winner every year, and there were three winners for 1987, and more recently 2020 and 2021. There were 40 Lifetime Achievement Awards in the first 25 years, through the 2011/2012 cycle.

=== Winners ===
Year	Winner	Ref.
1987	Fritz Leiber	
1987	Frank Belknap Long	
1987	Clifford D. Simak	
1988	Ronald Chetwynd-Hayes	
1988	Ray Bradbury	
1989	Robert Bloch	
1990	Hugh B. Cave	
1990	Richard Matheson	
1991	Gahan Wilson	
1992	Ray Russell	
1993	Joyce Carol Oates	
1994	Christopher Lee	
1995	Harlan Ellison	
1996	Forrey Ackerman	
1996	Ira Levin	
1997	William Peter Blatty	
1997	Jack Williamson	
1998	Ramsey Campbell	
1998	Roger Corman	
1999	Edward Gorey	
1999	Charles L. Grant	
2000	Nigel Kneale	
2001	John Farris	
2002	Stephen King	
2002	J. N. Williamson	
2003	Martin H. Greenberg	
2003	Anne Rice	
2004	Michael Moorcock	
2005	Peter Straub	
2006	Thomas Harris	
2007	John Carpenter	
2007	Robert Weinberg	
2008	F. Paul Wilson	
2008	Chelsea Quinn Yarbro	
2009	Brian Lumley	
2009	William F. Nolan	
2010	Ellen Datlow	
2010	Al Feldstein	
2011	Rick Hautala	
2011	Joe R. Lansdale	
2012	Clive Barker	
2012	Robert McCammon	
2013	Stephen Jones	
2013	R. L. Stine	
2014	Jack Ketchum	
2014	Tanith Lee	
2015	Alan Moore	
2015	George Romero	
2016	Dennis Etchison	
2016	Thomas Monteleone	
2017	Linda Addison	
2018	Graham Masterton	
2019	Owl Goingback	
2019	Thomas Ligotti	
2020	Carol J. Clover	
2020	Jewelle Gomez	
2020	Marge Simon	
2021	Jo Fletcher	
2021	Nancy Holder	
2021	Koji Suzuki	
2022	Elizabeth Massie	
2022	Nuzo Onoh	
2022	John Saul	
2023	Mort Castle	
2023	Cassandra Peterson	
2023	Steve Rasnic Tem	
2024	David Cronenberg	
2024	Del & Sue Howison	
2025	Lisa Morton	
2025	Jonathan Maberry	

=== Multiple awards ===
Six of the Bram Stoker Award winners have also been named SFWA Grand Masters by the Science Fiction and Fantasy Writers Association: Leiber, Simak, Bradbury, Ellison, Jack Williamson, and Moorcock.
