= Fictionwise =

Former American ebook seller

Fictionwise.com
- Type: Subsidiary
- Industry: Software
- Founded: June 5, 2000
- Defunct: December 4, 2012
- Fate: Acquired by Barnes & Noble in 2009, web store closed in 2012, some user accounts migrated to Nook store.
- Headquarters: New Jersey, USA
- Key people: R. Scott Pendergrast, Founder; J. Stephen Pendergrast, Founder
- Products: electronic books

Fictionwise, owned by Barnes & Noble since 2009, was one of the largest electronic book sellers in North America with an estimated 1.5 million ebook content units sold in 2008. Fictionwise sold both DRM-encrypted and unencrypted (DRM-free) ebooks in various formats (including ePub, eReader, and Mobipocket) that were compatible with computers as well as a wide range of eBook devices, PDAs, and Smartphones.

In November 2012, almost four years after being acquired by Barnes & Noble, the company announced that it was "winding down its business".

== History ==
The website Fictionwise.com was launched on June 5, 2000, as a partnership between J. Stephen Pendergrast and Mindwise Media, LLC, which is owned by the latter's brother R. Scott Pendergrast. The success of Fictionwise led to its being spun out of Mindwise Media into a separate company in October 2000.

On January 1, 2008, Fictionwise acquired the eReader business unit of Motricity, Inc. EReader, one of the oldest ebook sellers, originated under the name Peanut Press (which was founded in 1998) and was later renamed Palm Reader, a division of Palm Digital Media, when acquired by Palm, Inc. By acquiring eReader, Fictionwise nearly doubled in revenue.

After the eReader acquisition, Fictionwise immediately began expanding platform coverage of the eReader eBook format to include the three most recent versions of the Symbian operating system, the newer Mac OS X operating system, and the iPhone and iPod Touch platforms. They also made the "Pro" versions of eReader software free and developed the first mobile-friendly version of the eReader.com commerce site. In December 2008, Fictionwise licensed the eReader format to Lexcycle, which integrated it into their Stanza ebook reader for iPhone. Fictionwise indicated that additional licensing deals were in progress; the company released a BlackBerry beta version of eReader on March 11, 2009 and developed an Android version of eReader.

On March 5, 2009, Barnes & Noble acquired Fictionwise for $15.7 million in cash (plus the potential for earn-outs). Barnes & Noble said it planned to use Fictionwise as part of its overall digital strategy, which included the launch of an e-Bookstore later that year.

In March 2010, Fictionwise discontinued its "Buywise Club" which, in exchange for a membership fee, had offered discounted pricing for all their ebooks.

On November 15, 2012, Fictionwise announced that it would "wind down its operation" on December 4, 2012, and US customers would lose download access to their purchased books on December 21, 2012, non-US customers on January 31, 2013. US and UK customers were offered the option to transfer their customer account, including their purchased e-books, to a user account for Barnes & Noble's NOOK.

== See also ==
- Comparison of e-book formats: an overview of various e-book formats
