= Nuzo Onoh =

British-Nigerian writer (born 1962)

- Born: September 22, 1962 (age 64); Old Biafra, Nigeria
- Education: Master's degrees in Writing and Law from Warwick University
- Occupation: Novelist
- Children: Candice Onyeama and Carmen Jija Gyoh
- Writing career
- Genres: Fiction, Science Fiction, Speculative Fiction, Horror, African Horror
- Notable works: The Sleepless (2016); Dead Corpse (2017); A Dance for the Dead (2022)
- Notable awards: Bram Stoker Award for Lifetime Achievement; 2022

Nuzo Onoh (born 22 September 1962) is a Nigerian-British writer. She grew up the third of eight children of the late Chief Mrs Caroline Onoh, a former headteacher. Her father was Chief Dr. C.C Onoh, the wealthy landowner, lawyer, politician, and former governor of Anambra State. She experienced the Biafran war with Nigeria (1967–70) as a child refugee within numerous Biafran villages and towns and at the age of 13, she was the victim of an attempted "exorcism" by a local pastor. Due to this experience, she advocates for greater awareness of ritual child abuse in African communities.

On 17 June 2023, Nuzo Onoh became a recipient of the 2022 Bram Stoker Award for Lifetime Achievement. The award is conferred on "an individual whose work has substantially influenced the horror genre", and "is an acknowledgment of superior achievement in an entire career." Onoh is the first African and Black-British to win this award.

== Education ==
Nuzo Onoh attended Queen's School, in Enugu, Nigeria, as well as The Mount School, York, a Quaker boarding school in York, and later, St Andrew's Tutorial Centre, Cambridge, a sixth-form college in Cambridge, England. Onoh holds a law degree and a master's degree in writing from Warwick University.

== Writing ==
Onoh is a pioneer of the African horror subgenre. Onoh's books The Reluctant Dead (2014) and Unhallowed Graves (2015) are collections of ghost stories depicting core Igbo culture, traditions, beliefs and superstitions within a horror context.

She is the author of The Sleepless (2016), Dead Corpse (2017), Call Your Ancestors For Success & Happiness (2017) The Unclean (2020), A Dance for the Dead (2022) Where the Dead Brides Gather (2024) The Fake Ghost (2025) and Futility (2025). Onoh's work has appeared in magazines, podcasts, and anthologies, including the anthology REVELATIONS: Horror Writers for Climate Action. She has contributed to several award-winning anthologies, among which are Why I Love Horror: Essays on Horror Literature, winner of the Bram Stoker Award for "Superior Achievement in Long Non-Fiction" in 2026 Afro-Centered Futurisms in Our Speculative Fiction, winner of the 2025 Ignyte Award for Outstanding Creative Nonfiction and the Locus Award for Best Non-fiction. Africa Risen: A New Era of Speculative Fiction, winner of the 2023 Locus Award for Best Anthology. and Dominion: An Anthology of Speculative Fiction From Africa and the African Diaspora, winner of the British Fantasy Award for "Best Anthology. She has been featured in the iconic science-fiction magazine Starburst. and is listed in the reference book 80 Black Women in Horror (Sumiko Saulson, 2017) and 160 Black Women in Horror (2023). Onoh's works have been longlisted and shortlisted and have also been included in academic studies, including the Routledge Handbook of African Literature, Bloomsbury's Afro-Centered Futurisms in Our Speculative Fiction and Follow Me: Religion in Fantasy and Science Fiction. She has appeared on media platforms, discussing her writing and African Horror as a genre. She has written blogs for Female First Magazine, Daily Dead Magazine, CrimeReads Magazine, and Black Ballad magazine. Onoh has been mentioned as one of the British horror writers bringing a positive change to the way black and minority races are portrayed in mainstream horror fiction. Onoh has also given talks and lectures, including at the Miskatonic Institute of Horror Studies.

Onoh writes about vengeful African ghosts with unfinished business and has been described by one journalist as the "Queen of African Horror". Her writings have been described as works of "magical realism and horror", exploring the "philosophical positions that define the reality of Africa and Africans in a world that is bent towards Western globalization and the annihilation of African roots in culture." Her writing showcases both the beautiful and horrific in the African, mainly Igbo, culture and includes issues of religious hypocrisy, child abuse, ritual killings, dangerous superstitions, corrupt politicians, evil witchdoctors and the plight of widows in the broader African culture, all within a fictitious horror context. Her book The Sleepless, a ghost story tackling both the ritual abuse of children and the horrors of the Biafran War, has been described as "a genuine powerhouse of horror storytelling" and as a work that "goes beyond magical realism": "What distinguishes her genre as 'African Horror' is the detailed exploration of African beliefs on the mysterious and the spiritual, which reveals a lot about the 'African Self'".

== List of works ==
=== Novels ===
- Unhallowed Graves (2015)
- The Reluctant Dead (2014)
- The Sleepless (2016)
- Dead Corpse (2017)
- The Unclean (2020)
- A Dance for the Dead (2022)
- Where the Dead Brides Gather (2024)
- The Fake Ghost (2025)
- Futility (2025) ^{32}

=== Non-Fiction ===
- Call Your Ancestors For Success & Happiness (2017)

== Family ==
Onoh has two children, Candice Onyeama (writer and film director) and Carmen Jija Gyoh (Fintech Product Designer).
