= Gary William Crawford =

American poet

Gary William Crawford (January 1, 1953 – July 9, 2020) was an American writer and small press publisher.

He was the founder and editor of Gothic Press, which since 1979 has published books and periodicals in the field of Gothic fiction. From 1979 to 1987, Crawford produced six issues of the journal Gothic, which features articles on Gothic fiction from 1764 to 1986. Later, the press published the horror poetry magazine Night Songs. In recent years, the press has published The Gothic Chapbook Series, which features pamphlets of fiction, poetry and scholarship.

He had numerous poems, stories, and articles in the small press. He had an essay and bibliography on modern horror fiction in Horror Literature: A Core Collection and Reference Guide.

Crawford later began the online journal, Le Fanu Studies, about ghost and mystery story writer Sheridan Le Fanu, and is compiling Internet databases on Le Fanu, Fritz Leiber, Arthur Machen, Ramsey Campbell, Walter de la Mare and Robert Aickman. His M.A. thesis, "Sheridan Le Fanu's In a Glass Darkly: Ironic Distance and the Supernatural," Mississippi State University, 1977, is available from Crawford's Gothic Press. He also wrote an essay about Fritz Leiber for a book published by McFarland Publishers.

Crawford's poetry collection The Shadow City was nominated for a Bram Stoker Award from the Horror Writers Association. His collection of poetry, The Phantom World, was published by Sam's Dot Publishing in 2008 and was also nominated for a Stoker. Poems written in collaboration with Bruce Boston are in Boston's book Double Visions. In 2009, Dark Regions Press published Crawford's poetry collection Voices from the Dark.

He edited with Jim Rockhill and Brian J. Showers the book Reflections in a Glass Darkly: Essays on J. Sheridan Le Fanu for publication by Hippocampus Press. He has contributed entries to The Encyclopedia of the Vampire. He is co-author with Bruce Boston of the poetry collection Notes from the Shadow City, which is published by Dark Regions Press in 2012. Swan River Press in Dublin, Ireland has published a condensed version of his Le Fanu bibliography in pamphlet format. He recently edited a book of essays on Robert Aickman from Gothic Press and a book of essays on Ramsey Campbell. Works in progress prior to Crawford's death included (for Hippocampus Press) a critical study of Robert Aickman. A free online journal, Aickman Studies, edited by Tom R. Baynham, is available from Gothic Press at www.aickmandata.com/aickmanstudies.html.

Crawford contributed several articles to The Penguin Encyclopedia of Horror and the Supernatural (1986).

== Death ==
Gary Crawford died on July 9, 2020 in Baton Rouge, Louisiana, age 67.

== Bibliography ==
=== Poetry collections ===
- Poems of the Divided Self (1992)
- In Shadow Lands (1998)
- The Shadow City (2005)
- The Phantom World (2008)
- Voices from the Dark (2009)
- with Bruce Boston Notes from the Shadow City (2012)

=== Story collections ===
- Gothic Fevers (2000)
- Mysteries of Von Domarus, and Other Stories (2006)

=== Non-fiction ===
- Horror Literature: a core collection and reference guide (1981) (modern fiction section)
- Ramsey Campbell (1988)
- J. Sheridan Le Fanu: A Bio-Bibliography (1995)
- Robert Aickman: An Introduction (2003)
- Joseph Sheridan Le Fanu: A Concise Bibliography with Brian J. Showers (2011)
- Edited with Jim Rockhill and Brian J. Showers Reflections in a Glass Darkly: Essays on J. Sheridan Le Fanu (2011)
- Editor Insufficient Answers: Essays on Robert Aickman (2012)
- Editor Ramsey Campbell: Critical Essays on the Modern Master of Horror (2013)
