= Marge Simon =

American writer (born 1942)

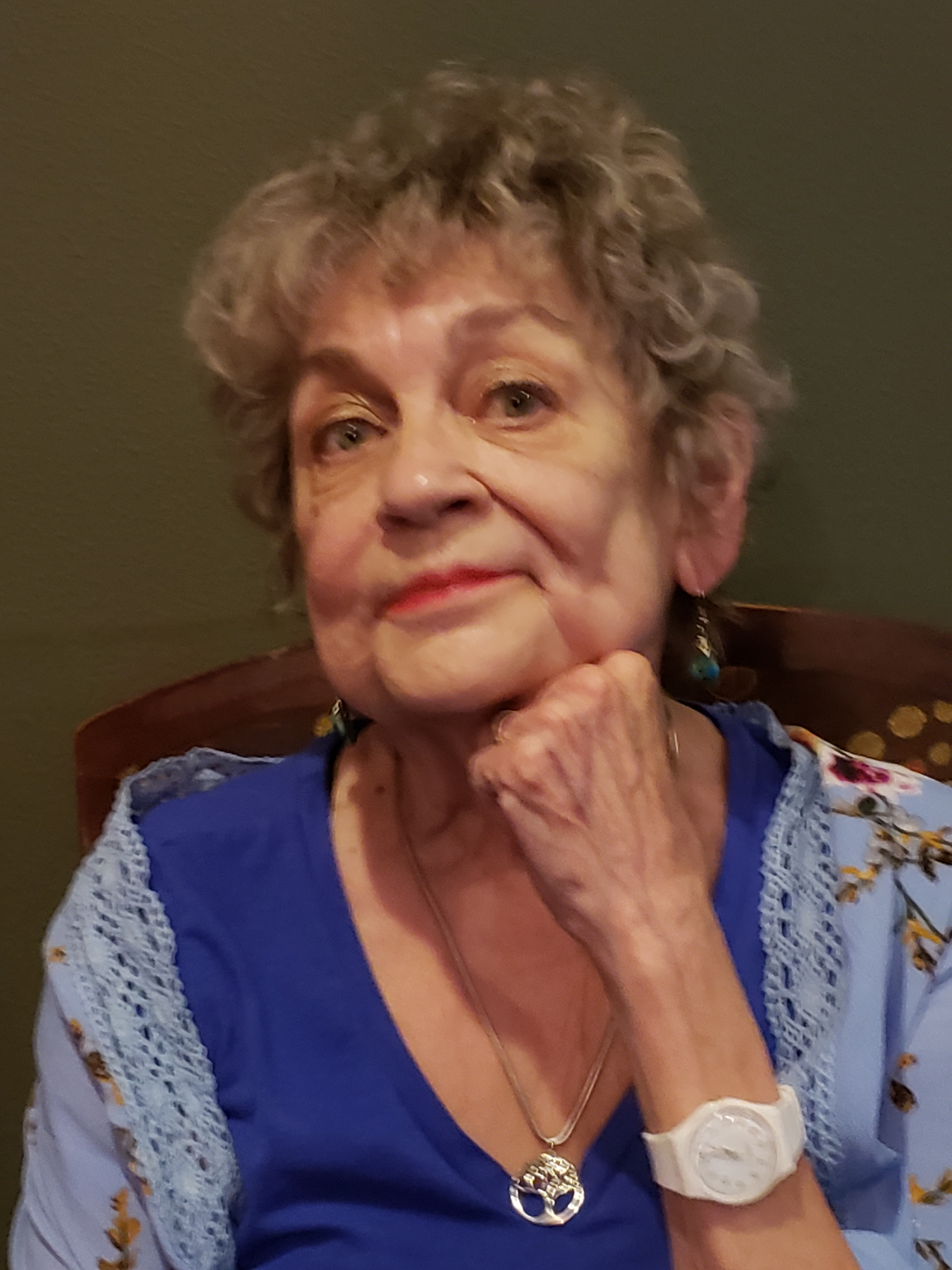
- American artist and a writer
- Born: 1942 (age 83–84); Bethesda, Maryland, U.S.
- Education: University of Northern Colorado (B.A., M.S.); Art Center College of Design
- Occupations: writer; poet; painter
- Spouse: Bruce Boston (m. 2001)
- Writing career
- Genre: speculative fiction
- Notable awards: Bram Stoker Award for Lifetime Achievement (r. 2021)

Marge Baliff Simon (born 1942) is an American artist and a writer of speculative poetry and fiction.

== Biography ==
=== Early life ===
Marge Simon was born in Bethesda, Maryland, but grew up in Boulder, Colorado.

=== Education and career ===
She received her BA and MA degrees from the University of Northern Colorado, and then continued her studies at the ArtCenter College of Design. Deciding against a career as a commercial artist, she began working as an art teacher in elementary schools instead.

In the mid-1980s, Simon began writing and illustrating for the small press and went on to become an award-winning writer. Simon's poems, short fiction, and illustrations have appeared in hundreds of publications, including Amazing Stories, Nebula Awards 32, Strange Horizons, The Pedestal Magazine, Chizine, Niteblade, Vestal Review, and Daily Science Fiction.

Simon is a former president of the Small Press Writers and Artists Organization and of the Science Fiction & Fantasy Poetry Association (SFPA). She is additionally a former editor of Star*Line, the SFPA's bimonthly journal.

In 2013, Simon began editing the column "Blood and Spades: Poets of the Dark Side" for the monthly newsletter of the Horror Writers Association. She serves as the Chair of the HWA Board of Trustees.

=== Marriage ===
Simon lives in Ocala, Florida, with her husband, writer Bruce Boston, with whom she sometimes collaborates.

== Published works ==
=== Poetry collections ===
- Poets of the Fantastic (co-ed. with Steve Eng). AE Press, 1993
- Eonian Variations. Dark Regions, 1995
- Night Smoke with Bruce Boston, ebook. Miniature Sun/Quixsilver, 2003 (Bram Stoker Award finalist)
- Artist of Antithesis, ebook. Miniature Sun, 2004 (Bram Stoker Award finalist)
- Vectors: A Week in the Death of a Planet with Charlee Jacob. Dark Regions, 2007 (Bram Stoker Award winner)
- Night Smoke with Bruce Boston, expanded print edition of the 2003 ebook. Kelp Queen Press, 2007
- Uneathly Delights. Sam's Dot Publishing, 2011
- The Mad Hattery. Elektrik Milk Bath Press, 2011
- The Four Elements with Linda Addison, Rain Graves, and Charlee Jacob. Bad Moon Books, 2012
- Dangerous Dreams with Sandy DeLuca. Elektrik Milk Bath Press, 2013
- Vectors: A Week in the Death of a Planet with Charlee Jacob
- Vampires, Zombies, and Wanton Souls
- Sweet Poison with Mary A. Turzillo
- Small Spirits: Dark Dolls
- Satan's Sweethearts with Mary A. Turzillo
- War with Alessandro Manzetti

=== Poetry and fiction collections ===
- Dragon Soup with Mary Turzillo. vanZeno Press, 2008
- Legends of the Fallen Sky with Malcolm Deeley. Sam's Dot Publishing, 2008
- City of a Thousand Gods with Malcolm Deeley. Sam's Dot Publishing, 2010

=== Fiction collections ===
- Like Birds in the Rain. Sam's Dot Publishing, 2007
- Christina's World. Sam's Dot Publishing, 2008
- The Dragon's Dictionary with Mary Turzillo. Sam's Dot Publishing, 2010

=== Art ===
- Gallery of color art at Strange Horizons.
- Soho Galleries, black and white art.

== Recognition ==
Simon's poem "Variants of the Obsolete" won the 1996 Rhysling Award for speculative poetry in the Long category. Her poems "Shutdown" and "George Tecumseh Sherman’s Ghosts" placed first in the Short category of the Rhyslings in 2015 and 2017, respectively.

Simon's short-form poem "Blue Rose Buddha" won the 2012 Dwarf Stars Award.

Vectors: A Week in the Death of a Planet, written by Simon in collaboration with Charlee Jacob, won the Bram Stoker Award for Best Poetry Collection in 2008. In 2012, Simon's collection Vampires, Zombies, and Wanton Souls was a recipient of the same award.

Sweet Poison, co-written with Mary A. Turzillo, won the 2015 Elgin Award for best full-length speculative poetry collection. Simon's Small Spirits: Dark Dolls placed second in the full-length book category of the 2017 Elgins, and Satan's Sweethearts, another collaborative work with Turzillo, placed second in the 2018 Elgins. War, written by Simon in collaboration with Alessandro Manzetti, won the 2019 Elgin for full-length book.

In 2015, Simon was created a Grand Master of the Science Fiction & Fantasy Poetry Association in recognition of more than twenty years of contributions to the field of speculative verse. She was presented with the 2020 Bram Stoker Award for Lifetime Achievement.
