= Maria Alexander =

American writer

- Occupation: Author
- Writing career
- Language: English
- Years active: 1989–present
- Genres: dark fantasy, horror, thriller, young adult, poetry
- Notable works: Mr. Wicker, Snowed
- Notable awards: Bram Stoker Award (2014); Bram Stoker Award (2016)
- Website: mariaalexander.net

Maria Elena Alexander is an American writer of horror and dark fantasy stories and poetry, best known for her award-winning novels Mr. Wicker (2014) and Snowed (2016).

== Background and early career ==
Alexander was born in Hayward, California. She first started writing at the age of eight: she contracted chicken pox and was forced to stay home with nothing to occupy her, so she began to create stories. She attended Ponderosa High School, and earned a bachelor's degree in English from California State University, Sacramento.

Alexander's career as a professional storyteller began in 1988, when she co-founded Dead Earth Productions, a horror Live Action Role-Playing company in the San Francisco Bay Area. She was Dead Earth's Lead Writer from 1989 to 1996.

Alexander entered the world of online game writing in 1994, when she became World Designer and In-World Storyteller for Fujitsu America's WorldsAway project, one of the first graphical virtual worlds. Working under Randy Farmer, she created the history, mythology, and cohesive storyline for the Dreamscape.

In 1997, Alexander began a film mentorship under Clive Barker and moved to Los Angeles. Her screenplays were subsequently quarterfinalists for the Austin Film Festival in 1998 and 1999, and the Nicholl Fellowship in 1999.

== Film and Fiction ==
In 2000, Alexander turned to short stories and poetry. Her work has appeared in Paradox, Chiaroscuro Magazine, Gothic.net, and assorted anthologies, and has been nominated for multiple awards. She has also published numerous nonfiction articles, including essays on Douglas Adams and George R.R. Martin.

In 2014, Alexander's debut novel, Mr. Wicker, won the 2014 Bram Stoker Award for Superior Achievement in a First Novel. Her next book, a young adult novel entitled Snowed, won the 2016 Bram Stoker Award for Superior Achievement in a Young Adult Novel and was nominated for the 2017 Anthony Award for Best Children's/YA Novel. Snowbound, the sequel to Snowed and the second book in a planned trilogy, was published in September 2018.

== Personal life ==
Alexander lives in Los Angeles, California, where, in addition to writing, she pursues her passion of sword fighting. She has studied Shinkendo, tameshigiri, stage combat, and the European small sword, and appeared in a special issue of Katsujinken Magazine entitled "Women of the Sword Arts." She has also written articles criticizing unrealistic portrayals of sword handling in art, fiction, and film, which has led to some controversy.

Alexander's hands have become temporarily disabled at times, but she has been able to continue to write using speech recognition technology.

== Nominations and awards ==
Year	Nominated Work	Category	Result	Ref
2017	Snowed	Anthony Award for Best Children's/YA Novel	Nominated	
2016	Snowed	Bram Stoker Award for Superior Achievement in a Young Adult Novel	Won	
2014	Mr. Wicker	Bram Stoker Award for Superior Achievement in a First Novel	Won	
2012	"Mrs. Winchester"	Shriekfest Best Horror Feature Screenplay	Finalist	
2011	At Louche Ends	Bram Stoker Award for Superior Achievement in a Poetry Collection	Nominated	
2004	"The Rage of Her Return"	AOL Time-Warner "Time to Rhyme" poetry contest	Won	
2003	"King of Shadows"	Moondance International Film Festival Selection, Short Story	Finalist	
1999	"Mr. Wicker"	Don and Gee Nicholl Fellowships in Screenwriting	Quarterfinalist	
1999	"Mrs. Winchester"	Austin Film Festival Drama Screenplay Award	Quarterfinalist	
1998	"Carpe Noctem"	Austin Film Festival Drama Screenplay Award	Quarterfinalist	

== Bibliography ==
=== Novels ===
- Mr. Wicker (2014)
- Snowed (2016)
- Snowbound (2018)
- Snowblind (2020)

=== Collections and Anthologies ===
- Biting Midnight: A Feast of Darksome Verse (2002)
- Sins of the Sirens (2008)
- At Louche Ends: Poetry for the Decadent, the Damned & the Absinthe-Minded (2011)
- Left Hanging: 9 Tales of Suspense and Thrills (2011)
- By the Pricking: 5 Dark Tales of Passion and Perversion (2013)
- 12 Tales Lie: 1 Tells True (2019)

=== Short fiction ===
- "Neighborhood Watchers" (2017)
- "Hey, Little Sister" (2016)
- "Some Divine" (2015)
- "Harvest of Flames" (2014)
- "Revivified" (2012)
- "Nickelback Ned" (2011)
- "Saturnalia" (2011)
- "Though Thy Lips Are Pale" (2009)
- "In Her Mirrors, Dimly" (2008)
- "The Last Word" (2008)
- "Pinned" (2008)
- "This Body of Death" (2005)
- "Veil of Skin" (2005)
- "The Dark River in His Flesh" (2004)
- "Conspiracy of One" (2004)
- "Agnus Dei" (2003)
- "Unholywood" aka "Samantha Blazes: Psychic Detective of LA" (2003)
- "Some Divine" (2002)
- "The King of Shadows" (2001)
- "When Gods Die" (2001)
- "Bacchus Anesti" (2000)
- "Coming Home" (2000)
- "Black Roses and Hail Marys" (2000)

=== Nonfiction ===
- "The Late, Great Halloween Costume Massacre" (2017)
- "George R.R. Martin: The Man Who Put Horror in Every Home" (2017)
- "The Witches of Winter" (2016)
- "Four of the Dumbest Things Done with Swords in Fiction and Film" (2014)
- "Baby Got Backbone: What Makes Strong Women Kick in Horror Films and TV Shows" (2014)
- "Five Things I Learned Writing Mr. Wicker" (2014)
- "What You See Is Who You Get: POV in Script-To-Book Adaptations" (2014)
- "Why I Hate (Most) Photos and Drawings of Women With Swords" (2013)
- "Me, Masturbation & Clive Barker" (2013)
- "The Greatest Story Ever Interacted With" (2012)
- "10 Reasons You HATE Poetry" (2012)
- "Twilight Merch Update: XXX Edition" (2010)
- "Dogma, Darth Vader and My Sexual Awakening" (2009)
- "Rendezvous and Retail in French BDSM" (2007)
- "Liberte, Egalite, Sexualite — French Philosophy and BDSM Culture" (2007)
- "Susan Pevensie" (2006)
- "Goodnight, Marvin" (2005)
- "Bloody Awful Poetry: Why It's So Easy to Write Bad Love Poetry" (2002)
- "Modern Madness" (1995)
- "The Psyberpsychology of Insanity" (1994)
- "Unscripted Theater: Guidelines for Running Cross-Genre, Live-Action Games, Dead Earth Productions" (1994)
- "Graphology" (1992)
