= Jessica McHugh =

American novelist

- Born: Jessica Brianne Bonito; November 15, 1982 (age 43)
- Occupation: Writer
- Writing career
- Genre: Speculative fiction
- Website: www.mchughniverse.com

Jessica McHugh (born November 15, 1982) is an American author of speculative fiction, member of the Maryland Writers Association, and an affiliate member of the Horror Writers Association. A prolific writer, she has had eighteen books published by small presses in seven years. Her first play "Fool Call It Fate: A Story of Sex, Coincidence, and an Electronic Cigarette", produced at The Mobtown Theater, was chosen as the Best New Play of 2011 by Baltimore Broadway World.

== Bibliography ==
=== Novels ===
- Camelot Lost (2008) (as Jessica Bonito)
- A Touch of Scarlet (2009) (ISBN 9781926704203)
- Song of Eidolons (2009) (ISBN 161658274X)
- From the Herald's Wearied Eye (2010)
- The Sky: The World (2010)
- Tales of Dominhydor
  - Maladrid (Book One) (2010)
  - Yven (Book Two) (2011)
  - Palaplia (Book Three) (2011)
- Rabbits in the Garden (2011)
- Danny Marble & the Application for Non-Scary Things (2011)
- Play the Way Home (2012) (as E.J. McCain)
- PINS (2012)
- The Maiden Voyage (2014)
- The Darla Decker Diaries
  - Darla Decker Hates to Wait (2014)
  - Darla Decker Takes the Cake (2014)
  - Darla Decker Shakes the State (2015)
  - Darla Decker Plays it Straight (2016)
  - Darla Decker Breaks the Case (2017)
- The Green Kangaroos (2014)
- The Train Derails in Boston (2016)
- Nightly Owl, Fatal Raven (2018)

=== Collections ===
- Virtuoso at Masturbation, and More McHughmorous Musings (2013)
- The Maiden Voyage & Other Departures (2018)
- A Complex Accident of Life (2020)

=== Short stories ===
- "Begging for Relief" (2010)
- "Under the Slide" (2010)
- "Gather Ye Rosebuds" (2010)
- "My Caroline, My Love" (2010)
- "The Last Circus" (2011)
- "Resuscitation" (2011)
- "Maternal Instincts" (in It Lives: What Hath Mother Wrought? Anthology from Runewright Publishing, 2011)
- "Master Marvel's Menagerie" (in Dead Souls Anthology from Post Mortem Press, 2011)
- "Beer-Basted" (in 100 Horrors Anthology from Cruentus Libri Press, 2012)
- "A Ride in the Dream Machine" (in Torn Realities Anthology from Post Mortem Press, 2012)
- "Extraction" (in Fear the Abyss Anthology from Post Mortem Press, 2012)
- "Crazed in Christmas City" (in Let It Snow: Season's Readings for a Super Cool Yule Anthology, 2012)
- "Love Aground" (in Zombies Need Love, Too Anthology from Dark Moon Books, 2013)
- "Mowed" (in Dark Bits Anthology from Apokrupha, 2013)
- "Auntie Grave" (in The Gothic Blue Book III, Graveyard Edition Anthology from Burial Day Books, 2013)
- "The Brain Train" (in Coffin Hop: Death By Drive-In Anthology, 2013)
- "On the Shoulders of Muses" (in Allegories of the Tarot Anthology, 2013)
- "Food For Thought" (One Night Stand, Perpetual Motion Machine Publishing, 2013)
- "The Right Stuff" (in Tall Tales with Short Cocks volume 4 Anthology from Rooster Republic Press, 2013)
- "A Fate My Lover Feared" (in Fur and Fang Anthology from Apokrupha LLC, 2014)
- "The Riddled Heart" (in Lucky 13 Anthology from Padwolf Publishing, 2014)
- "A Ribbon, A Rover" (in Truth or Dare Anthology from Perpetual Motion Machine Publishing, 2014)
- "Another Pleasant Valley Sunday" (in Jamais Vu: The Journal of Strange Among the Familiar, 2014)
- "Domestic Hate" (in Potatoes Anthology from Fringeworks LLC, 2014)
- "Blue Moon Over Gigi" (in Vignettes from the End of the World Anthology from Apokrupha, 2014)

=== Plays ===
- "Fools Call It Fate" (Lazy Bee Scripts, 2010)
- "Two Grunts For Yes" (Lazy Bee Scripts, 2017)
