= Voltari =

Business enterprise

- Company type: Public Company
- Traded as: Nasdaq: VLTC
- Industry: Commercial Real Estate
- Founded: 1 January 2001
- Headquarters: New York, New York, USA
- Area served: Worldwide
- Key people: Kenneth Goldman; Principal Executive Officer; Peter Kaouris; Principal Financial Officer; Peter K. Shea; Chairman; Sachin Latawa; Independent Director; Jaffrey Adam Firestone; Independent Director; Kevin Lewis; Independent Director
- Website: www.voltari.com

Voltari Corp (Nasdaq: VLTC) is a company that engages in the business of acquiring, financing, and leasing commercial real properties. It is headquartered at 767 Fifth Avenue, New York. Shares of Voltari common stock trade on the Nasdaq under the symbol VLTC.

== History ==
Voltari was formed in August 2012 as an operating business of Motricity. On April 10, 2013, upon completion of reorganization, Motricity became a wholly owned subsidiary of Voltari, which replaced Motricity as a publicly held corporation.

After Carl Icahn acquired a controlling interest in the company in August 2015, the board of directors unanimously approved a plan to transform the company into a commercial real estate business. Since the transformation began, Koala Holdings LP, an affiliate of Carl Icahn, has been financing Voltari’s acquisition of commercial real-estate properties.

On 25 March 2019, Voltari Corporation has confirmed that it has entered into a Merger Arrangement and Plan with Starfire Holding Corporation, a Carl C. Icahn subsidiary and a member of the main owners of the company, High River Limited Partnership and Koala Holding LP, in which Starfire would purchase the company.

== Real Property Acquisitions ==
On September 17, 2015, Voltari acquired a real estate parcel in Long Branch, New Jersey. The property is subject to a triple net lease with JPMorgan Chase, the original term of which expires in June, 2020 (with two, five-year renewal options).

On May 18, 2016, Voltari acquired a real estate parcel in Flanders, New York. The property is subject to a double net lease with 7-Eleven, the original term of which expires in December 2029 (with four, five-year renewal options and together with the Original Term)).

On April 23, 2018 Voltari acquired a real estate property in Columbia, South Carolina. The property is subject to a triple net lease with The McClatchy Company.

== Recent Developments ==
On December 17, 2017, Icahn acquired an additional 1257 shares of Voltari's Series J Non-Convertible Preferred stock at $27.63 per share. Icahn now owns 52.7% of Voltari's outstanding, and 98% of the preferred shares, respectively.

== Board of directors ==
On June 14, 2018, Voltari shareholders elected the following board members:

- Peter K. Shea
- Jaffrey (Jay) A. Firestone
- Sachin Latawa (2)
- Kevin Lewis
