= Christina Sng =

Singaporean poet and writer (born 1972)

- Born: 28 October 1972; Singapore
- Occupations: Writer, poet
- Awards: Bram Stoker Award for Best Poetry Collection (2017); Bram Stoker Award for Best Poetry Collection (2020); Bram Stoker Award for Best Poetry Collection (2021)
- Website: christinasng.com

Christina Sng (born 28 October 1972) is a Singaporean poet and writer whose work often deals with themes of horror and speculative fiction. She is the first person from Singapore to win a Bram Stoker Award and is a three time winner of the Bram Stoker Award for Best Poetry Collection. She also won the 2024 Elgin Award from the Science Fiction & Fantasy Poetry Association.

Christina Sng was born on 28 October 1972 in Singapore. She was raised in Amber Mansions in Dhoby Ghaut, across from the YMCA Building used as a headquarters of Kempeitai during the Japanese occupation of Singapore, which lead to local rumours of hauntings. She cites horror films of the 1980s such as Nightmare On Elm Street (1984) and Poltergeist (1982) as a key influence.

She began writing horror as a teenager and started publishing her poems in 2000, with the first appearing in the American journal Dreams And Nightmares. Her poetry collection A Collection Of Nightmares (2017), which contained her work written over the span of 18 years, won the 2017 Bram Stoker Award for Best Poetry Collection. She won again in 2020 and 2021 for her collection A Collection of Dreamscapes (2020) and Tortured Willows: Bent. Bowed. Unbroken (2021), an anthology of work by her, Lee Murray, Geneve Flynn, and Angela Yuriko Smith. Her collection The Gravity of Existence (2022) was nominated for a Bram Stoker Award and won the 2024 Elgin Award. Sng also writes haiku and won third place in the 2016 Annual Harold G. Henderson Award for Best Unpublished Haiku from the Haiku Society of America.

== Bibliography ==
- The Darkside of Eden. Allegra Press, 2002. ISBN 981-04-5750-2
- Dark Dreams. Naked Snake Press, 2006; Smashwords, 2011.
- Catku. Allegra Press, October 2016. ISBN 978-981-11-1483-0
- An Assortment of Sky Things. Allegra Press, October 2016. ISBN 978-981-11-1481-6
- Astropoetry. Alban Lake Publishing, February 2017.
- A Collection of Nightmares. Raw Dog Screaming Press. 14 July 2017. ISBN 978-1-935738-98-5.
- A Collection of Dreamscapes. Raw Dog Screaming Press. 16 April 2020. ISBN 978-1-947879-17-1.
- Murray, Lee, Geneve Flynn, Christina Sng, and Angela Yuriko Smith. Tortured Willows: Bent. Bowed. Unbroken. Yuriko Publishing, 2021. ISBN 978-1-7372083-3-4
- The Gravity of Existence: Poems. Houston, Texas: Interstellar Flight Press. 2022. ISBN 978-1-953736-17-8.
