= Cynthia Pelayo =

Puerto Rican–American author and poet

- Pelayo at the 2026 Texas Book Festival
- Born: Puerto Rico
- Education: Columbia College Chicago (BA, Journalism); Roosevelt University (MS, Marketing); School of the Art Institute of Chicago (MFA, Writing)
- Occupations: Author, poet, journalist
- Writing career
- Genres: Horror, crime fiction, poetry, comics
- Notable works: Lotería (2023); Children of Chicago (2021); It Came from Neverland (2026); Something Followed Us Home (2026, editor)
- Notable awards: Bram Stoker Award for Superior Achievement in a Poetry Collection (2022) – Crime Scene; International Latino Book Award, Best Mystery (2021) – Children of Chicago
- Website: www.cynthiapelayo.com

Cynthia Pelayo is a Puerto Rican-born American author, poet, and journalist whose work spans horror, crime fiction, and poetry. In 2022 she received the Bram Stoker Award for Superior Achievement in a Poetry Collection for Crime Scene, and sources identify her as the first Puerto Rican and first Latina recipient of a Bram Stoker Award. Coverage of her work has appeared in publications including The New York Times, the Chicago Tribune, and Library Journal. Pelayo has also contributed to Marvel Comics.

== Education ==
Pelayo earned a Bachelor of Arts in Journalism from Columbia College Chicago, a Master of Science in Marketing from Roosevelt University, and a Master of Fine Arts in Writing from the School of the Art Institute of Chicago (SAIC). While at SAIC, she developed work that later informed her short story collection Lotería.

== Career ==
Early in her career, Pelayo worked as a journalist for Chicago community outlets, including Time Out Chicago.

Her publications include the poetry collections Poems of My Night (2016), Into the Forest and All the Way Through (2020), and Crime Scene (2022); the short story collection Lotería (2023); and the novels Children of Chicago (2021), The Shoemaker's Magician (2023), Forgotten Sisters (2024), and Vanishing Daughters (2025).

In 2025, Pelayo co-wrote the Marvel Comics one-shot White Tiger: Reborn, part of the Marvel Voices: Comunidades line, with a story illustrated by Moisés Hidalgo.

In 2026, Pelayo published It Came from Neverland, a horror novel set during World War I that reimagines the Peter Pan mythology through the perspective of an adult Wendy Darling. The novel received starred reviews from Library Journal and Booklist.

Also in 2026, Pelayo edited Something Followed Us Home: Tales of Latiné Horror (Atria/Primero Sueño Press, September 2026), an anthology of Latiné horror fiction in which she also appears as a contributor.

In 2025, Newcity included Pelayo on its Chicago Lit 50 list. She is co-publisher of Burial Day Books, a press focused on horror writing.

== Essays and nonfiction ==
- 2021: "I Need to Believe" (Southwest Review 105.3) — nominated for the Bram Stoker Awards.
- 2021: "Fairy Tales Are Dark for a Reason — They're Trying to Warn Us About Danger" (CrimeReads).
- 2024: "How to Write Horror - With Cynthia Pelayo" (LitReactor).
- 2025: "Five SFF Books Set in Chicago" (Tor.com/Reactor).
- 2025: "Incorporating Nonfiction and True Crime Into a Genre Novel" (Writer's Digest).
- 2025: "Ghosts are not the Monsters: Murders, Apparitions, and Violence Against Women" (PEN America/PEN Ten).

== Reception ==
Children of Chicago (2021) was discussed by the Los Angeles Review of Books as blending crime fiction and dark fairy tales, and was included in The New York Times coverage of new horror novels in 2021. Newcity Lit reviewed the novel in 2021.

The Shoemaker's Magician (2023) received a starred review from Library Journal and was included in The New York Times round-up of new horror titles in 2023.

Forgotten Sisters (2024) was covered by the Chicago Review of Books and reviewed by Library Journal.

Vanishing Daughters (2025) was reviewed by Paste Magazine, Library Journal, and the Chicago Tribune.

Crime Scene (2022) was reviewed by Monster Librarian.

It Came from Neverland (2026) received starred reviews from Library Journal and Booklist.

== Media coverage ==
Pelayo's work and projects have been covered by the Chicago Sun-Times, Chicago Tribune, The New York Times, and WTTW.

In 2010, following the lapse of the Poe Toaster tradition in Baltimore, Pelayo was photographed at Edgar Allan Poe's gravesite, an image and event noted by The Guardian, ESPN, and other outlets.

== Awards and recognition ==
- Bram Stoker Award for Superior Achievement in a Poetry Collection (Crime Scene, 2022). Sources identify Pelayo as the first Puerto Rican and first Latina to receive a Bram Stoker Award.
- Finalist, Bram Stoker Award for Superior Achievement in a Poetry Collection (Into the Forest and All the Way Through, 2020).
- Finalist, Bram Stoker Award for Superior Achievement in a Novel (Children of Chicago, 2021).
- Winner, International Latino Book Award, Best Mystery (Children of Chicago, 2021).
- Honorable Mention, International Latino Book Awards (Forgotten Sisters, 2025, Best Mystery – English).
- Nominated, Elgin Award (Full-Length) for Poems of My Night (2017); Into the Forest and All the Way Through (2021); and Crime Scene (2023).
- Finalist, CHIRBy Awards (Chicago Review of Books Awards, Fiction) for Vanishing Daughters (2025).
- Finalist, Locus Award, Best Horror Novel (Forgotten Sisters, 2025).
- Finalist, Bram Stoker Award for Superior Achievement in Short Non-Fiction (2025).

== Bibliography ==
=== Novels ===
- Children of Chicago. Agora/Polis Books, 2021. ISBN 9781951709204
- The Shoemaker's Magician. Agora/Polis Books, 2023. ISBN 9781957957104
- Forgotten Sisters. Thomas & Mercer, 2024. ISBN 978-1-6625-1392-3
- Vanishing Daughters. Thomas & Mercer, 2025. ISBN 978-1-6625-1393-0
- It Came from Neverland. Crooked Lane, 2026. ISBN 979-8-89242-444-8

=== Poetry / Verse Narratives ===
- Poems of My Night. Raw Dog Screaming Press, 2016. ISBN 978-1-935738-88-6
- Into the Forest and All the Way Through. Burial Day Books, 2020. ISBN 9781735693613
- Crime Scene. Raw Dog Screaming Press, 2022. ISBN 9781947879485

=== Short Story Collections ===
- Lotería. Agora/Union Square & Co., 2023. ISBN 978-1-4549-6149-9

=== Edited Works ===
- Something Followed Us Home: Tales of Latiné Horror (editor). Atria/Primero Sueño Press, 2026. ISBN 978-1-6680-9194-4

=== Comics ===
- White Tiger: Reborn (with Daniel José Older). Marvel Comics, 2025. Part of Marvel Voices: Comunidades.

== Personal life ==
Pelayo was born in Puerto Rico and moved to Chicago at age 2. She lives in Chicago with her husband, Gerardo Pelayo, and their two children.
