= David Niall Wilson =

American writer (born 1959)

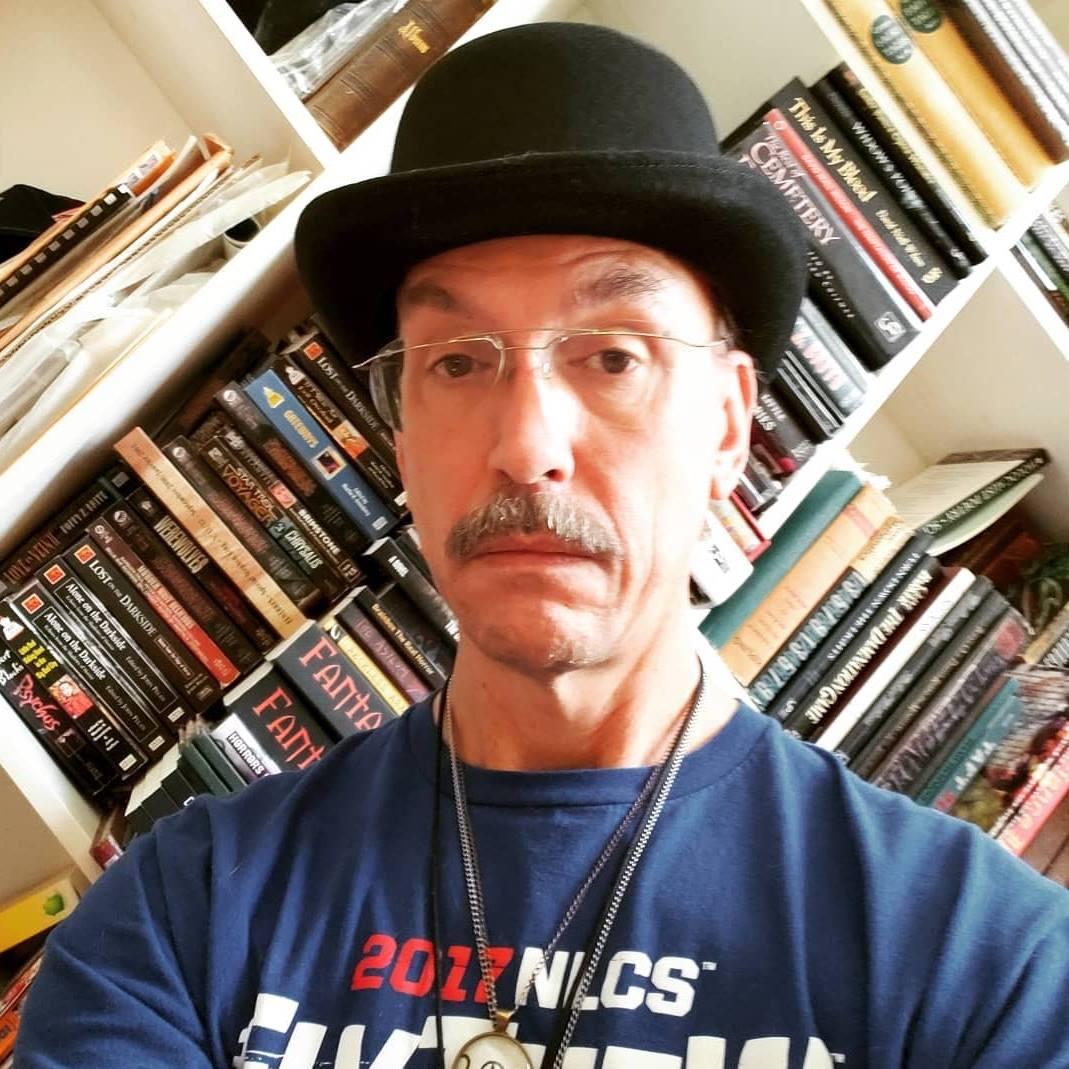
- Born: 1959 (age 66–67); Clay County, Illinois, U.S.
- Occupation: Writer
- Writing career
- Genres: Horror fiction; science fiction; fantasy
- Website: davidniallwilson.com

David Niall Wilson (born 1959 in Clay County, Illinois) is an American writer primarily known for his works of horror, science fiction, and fantasy fiction. He is also the founder and CEO of Crossroad Press, a publishing house for horror and science fiction/fantasy. He is the former President of the Horror Writers Association of America and a two time Stoker Award winning author (Short Fiction, Poetry Collection).

== The Academic Study of Wilson's Novels ==
Scholars such as A. Asbjørn Jøn, at the University of Canterbury, have positively received Wilson's The Grails Covenant Trilogy (1997–1998) - even noting the way that it fits within a continuum of shifting popular culture portrayals of vampires.

== Bibliography ==
=== Novels ===
- The Path of the Meteor (limited release - Re-released as Darkness Falling by Crossroad Press in 2010 - paperback edition 2016)
- Star Trek: Voyager #12: Chrysalis (1997, ISBN 0-671-00150-7)
- The Grails Covenant Trilogy (1997–1998)
  - To Sift Through the Bitter Ashes (1997, ISBN 1-56504-995-0)
  - To Speak in Lifeless Tongues (1998, ISBN 1-56504-996-9)
  - To Dream of Dreamers Lost (1998, ISBN 1-56504-997-7)
- This is My Blood (1999, ISBN 0-9658135-3-3)
- Roll Them Bones (Cemetery Dance Publications' Novella #12, 2003, ISBN 1-58767-068-2)
- Dark Ages: Lasombra (2003, ISBN 1-58846-820-8)
- Deep Blue (2004, ISBN 1-59414-142-8, hardcover; 2005, ISBN 1-4104-0228-2, paperback)
- The Temptation of Blood (2004, ISBN 1-930997-69-8)
- Exalted: Relic of the Dawn (2004, ISBN 1-58846-860-7)
- The Mote in Andrea's Eye (2005, Thompson-Gale / Fives Star - 2013 Crossroad Press)
- Ancient Eyes (2007, Bloodletting Press Signed Limited HC)
- The Not Quite Right Reverend Cletus J. Diggs & the Currently Accepted Habits of Nature (2009 limited edition HC from Bad Moon Books)
- The Orffyreus Wheel (Crossroad Press, 2010)
- Sins of the Flash (2010 digital release from Crossroad Press)
- Killer Green (2013 Crossroad Press)
- The Second Veil (2013 from Crossroad Press - Tales of the Scattered Earth Series)
- The Crazy Crazy Case of Foreman James - A Cletus J. Diggs Mystery - (2013 from Crossroad Press)
- Block 10 (With Stacy Childs - 2014 Crossroad Press)
- The Blackguards (With Richard Murphy - 2014 Crossroad Press)
- Remember Bowling Green - The Adventures of Frederick Douglass - Time Traveler (With Patricia Lee Macomber - 2017 from Crossroad Press)
- Gideon's Curse (2017 from Crossroad Press)
- The DeChance Chronicles (2009–present)
  - Heart of a Dragon (2011 from Crossroad Press)
  - Vintage Soul (2009 Thompson-Gale Five Star & Limited HC from Bad Moon Books)
  - My Soul to Keep (2012 from Crossroad Press)
  - Kali's Tale (2012 from Crossroad Press)
  - Nevermore (2013 from Crossroad Press)
  - A Midnight Dreary (2019 from Crossroad Press)
- Novels of the O.C.L.T.
  - The Parting (2011 from Crossroad Press)
  - The Temple of Camazotz (Novella 2011 from Crossroad Press)
  - Crockatiel (2016 Crossroad Press)

=== Collections ===
- Spinning Webs and Telling Lies (Limited Trade Paperback 2002 - eBook / Audio from Crossroad Press 2009)
- The Subtle Ties That Bind (2002, Lone Wolf Publications CD Rom)
- Defining Moments (2007, Sarob Press Signed limited HC digital and audio 2009 from Crossroad Press)
- Ennui & Other States of Madness (2008 from Dark Regions Press)
- The Fall of the House of Escher & Other Illusions (1996 limited trade paperback - 2010 digital from Crossroad Press)
- The Taste of Blood & Roses (2010 Crossroad Press digital)
- The Whirling Man & Other Tales of Pain, Blood and Madness (2010 by Crossroad Press)
- The Call of Distant Shores (2011 from Crossroad Press)
- Etched Deep & Other Dark Impressions (2012 From Crossroad Press)
- Intermusings (Formerly Joined at the Muse - with various collaborators - 2012 from Crossroad Press eBook and Audible)
- An Unkindness of Ravens (With Patricia Lee Macomber 2013 from Crossroad Press)

=== Children's books ===
- Mars Needs Pumpkins (Illustrator - with Katie Mary Wilson 2011 from Crossroad Press)
- Perilous Pink PcGee (With Katie Mary Wilson 2012 from Crossroad Press)
- The Kingdom of Clowns (2013 from Crossroad Press)
- Bob Goes to Mars (Illustrator - with Katie Mary Wilson 2013 from Crossroad Press)
- The Skeleton Inside Me (2014 from Crossroad Press)
- The Halloween House & Others (2016 from Crossroad Press)

=== FILM ===
- GODHEAD - The Movie (2008 With Rosanna Jeran & Blurgirl Productions)

=== Stories and Poetry ===
- Poet Cabal: (one poem)
- The Essential World of Darkness: "Except You Go Through Shadow--Wraith"
- 100 Vicious Little Vampire Stories: "Just Another Saturday Night"
- Robert Bloch's Psychos: "Blameless" (1998, ISBN 0-671-88598-7)
- The Best of Cemetery Dance, Volume I: "The Mole" (2000, ISBN 0-451-45804-4)
- Horrors! 365 Scary Stories: (seven short stories) (2001, ISBN 1-58663-240-X)
- The Gossamer Eye (2002, ISBN 1-892065-64-9, with Mark McLaughlin and Rain Graves) (winner of the 2003 Bram Stoker Award for Superior Achievement in the Poetry Collection category)
- All Hell Breaking Loose: "Burning Bridges" (2005, ISBN 0-7564-0289-1)
- Shadows over Baker Street: New Tales of Terror: "Death Did Not Become Him" (2005, ISBN 0-345-45273-9, with Patricia Lee Macomber)
- Cthulhu's Heirs: New Cthulhu Mythos Fiction: "Of Dark Things and Midnight Planes" (1994, ISBN 1-56882-013-5)

His short stories have appeared in more than thirty anthologies, in magazines, and on websites.
