= Mary Turzillo =

American novelist (born 1940)

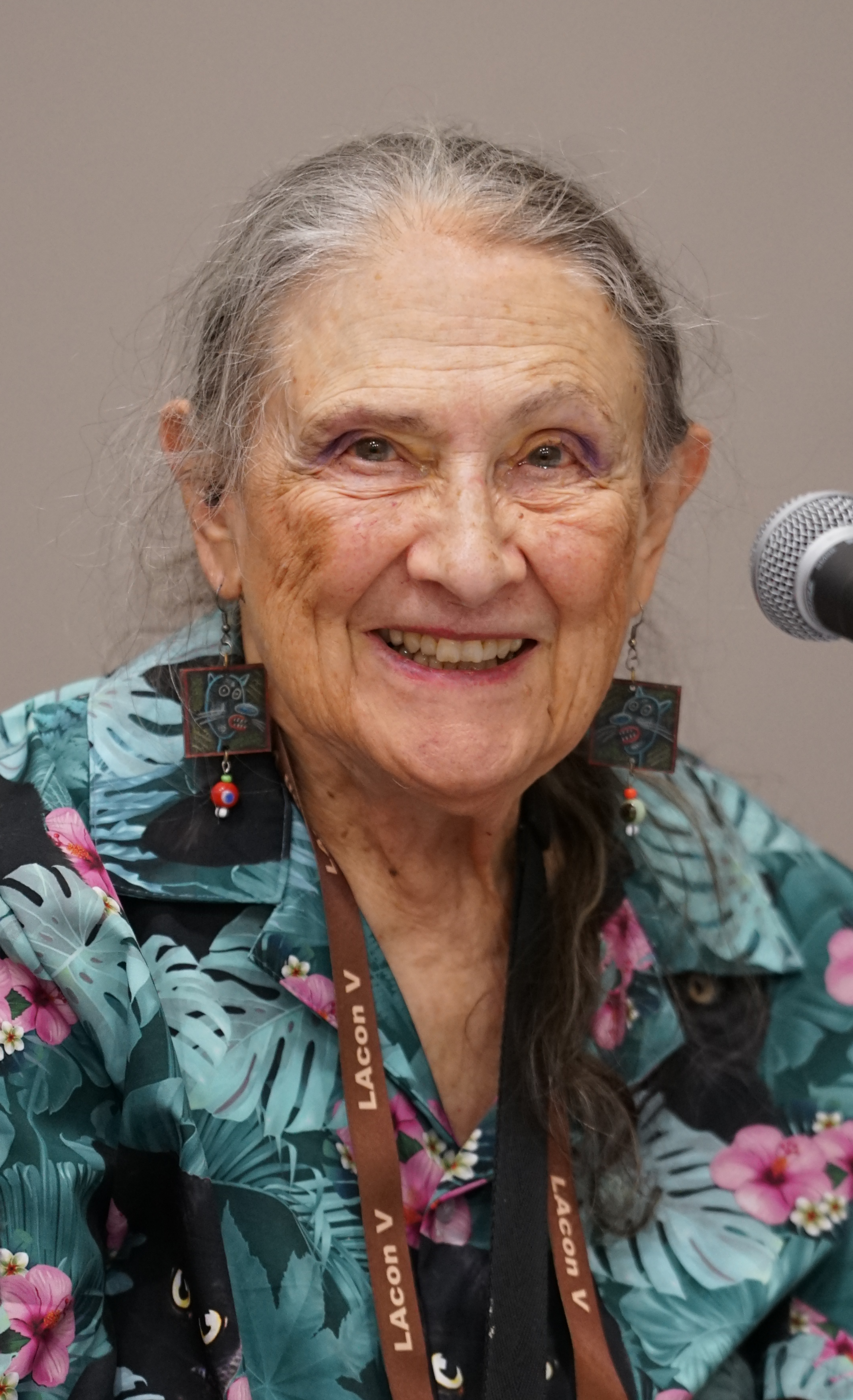
- Turzillo at Worldcon 2026
- Born: 1940 (age 85–86)
- Spouse: Geoffrey A. Landis
- Writing career
- Pen name: Mary T. Brizzi
- Genre: Speculative fiction
- Notable work: "Mars is No Place for Children"
- Notable awards: Nebula Award; Novelette division 2000 Mars is No Place for Children
- Website: www.maryturzillo.com

Mary A. Turzillo (born 1940) is an American science fiction writer noted primarily for short stories. She won the Nebula Award for Best Novelette in 2000 for her story "Mars is No Place for Children," published originally in Science Fiction Age. Her story "Pride," published originally in Fast Forward 1, was a Nebula award finalist for best short story of 2007.

She was formerly a professor of English at Kent State University, where she wrote articles and several books of science fiction criticism under the name Mary T. Brizzi, including Reader's Guide to Anne McCaffrey and Reader's Guide to Philip José Farmer. She attended the Clarion Workshop in 1985, and she founded the Cajun Sushi Hamsters writing workshop in Cleveland, Ohio.

In 2022, she was the author guest of honor at the Convention Marcon 57

== Fiction ==
Although Mary had published poetry and academic works before attending the Clarion Writers workshop, her main publications in science fiction occurred following Clarion, with the publication of the stories “What Do I See In You” in Writers of the Future Volume IV, and “Kings” in Pulphouse: the Hardback magazine. After this her work appeared regularly in the SF magazines such as The Magazine of Fantasy & Science Fiction and Analog Science Fiction and Fact, as well as original anthologies such as Universe and Fast Forward.

Her first novel, An Old Fashioned Martian Girl, was serialized in Analog magazine in 2004, and a revised version, Mars Girls, appeared from Apex in 2017. Her short story collection Bonsai Babies appeared from Omnium Gatherum in 2016. Her short story collection Cosmic Cats and Fantastic Furballs, a collection of science fiction and fantasy stories featuring cats, appeared from WordFire Press in 2022.

== Poetry ==
Turzillo is also a poet, published in a number of national publications. Her collection of poetry, Your Cat & Other Space Aliens, was published by VanZeno Press in 2007. A collaborative collection of poetry and fiction, Dragon Soup (written with artist and poet Marge Simon), appeared from VanZeno in 2008, and another collaboration with Simon, The Dragon's Dictionary, was published by Sam's Dot in 2010.

She has won several Ohio Poetry Day awards. She has won the Science Fiction Poetry Association's Elgin Award for best poetry book twice. In 2013, her collection Lovers and Killers (Dark Regions, 2012). In 2015, her poetry book Sweet Poison, a collaboration with Marge Simon (Dark Renaissance Books, 2014) won the award.

== Academic work ==
Turzillo has a Ph.D. in English from Case Western Reserve University, where her Ph.D. thesis was "The writer as double agent: essays on the conspiratorial mode in contemporary fiction." She worked as a professor in the English Department of the Trumbull Campus of Kent State University. Under the name Mary T. Brizzi, she has published a number of papers in the area of science fiction criticism, and is the author of two books, Reader's Guide to Anne McCaffrey and Reader's Guide to Philip José Farmer.

== Personal life ==
In her private life, Turzillo is a competitive fencer. In 2016, she was a member of the U.S women's foil team at the Veterans Fencing World Championships in Stralsund, Germany.

She is married to fellow science fiction writer Geoffrey A. Landis.

== Bibliography ==
=== Novels ===
- Turzillo, Mary (2004). An old-fashioned Martian girl.
  - — (2017). Mars girls. Apex Books.

=== Short fiction ===
Collections

- Turzillo, Mary (2016). Bonsai Babies. Omnium Gatherum. ISBN 978-0997971743.
- Turzillo, Mary (2022). Cosmic Cats and Fantastic Furballs. Wordfire. ASIN B09W4JGDJM.

Stories

Title	Year	First published	Reprinted/collected	Notes
Crimes against nature	1994	Turzillo, Mary A. (February 1994). "Crimes against nature". Interzone. 80.		
An old-fashioned Martian girl - part I of IV	2004	Turzillo, Mary A. (July–August 2004). "An old-fashioned Martian girl - part I of IV". Analog. 124 (7&8).		
An old-fashioned Martian girl - part II of IV	2004	Turzillo, Mary A. (September 2004). "An old-fashioned Martian girl - part II of IV". Analog. 124 (9).		
An old-fashioned Martian girl - part III of IV	2004	Turzillo, Mary A. (October 2004). "An old-fashioned Martian girl - part III of IV". Analog. 124 (10).		
An old-fashioned Martian girl - part IV of IV	2004	Turzillo, Mary A. (November 2004). "An old-fashioned Martian girl - part IV of IV". Analog. 124 (11).		
The Guatemala cure	1995	Sheffield, Charles, ed. (1995). How to save the world. Pyr. ISBN 0-312-85577-X.	Sheffield, Charles, ed. (1999). How to save the world (pbk ed.). Pyr. ISBN 0-312-86784-0.	
Mate	1997	Turzillo, Mary A. (February 1997). "Mate". F&SF. 92 (2).		
Chrysoberyl	1998	Turzillo, Mary A. (June 1998). "Chrysoberyl". F&SF. 94 (6).		
Mars is no place for children	1999	Turzillo, Mary A. (May 1999). "Mars is no place for children". Science Fiction Age.	Silverberg, Robert, ed. (2001). Nebula Awards showcase 2001. Harcourt. ISBN 0-15-100581-8. —, ed. (2001). Nebula Awards showcase 2001 (pbk ed.). Harcourt. ISBN 0-15-601335-5.	Nebula Award winner, 2000
By Ben Cruachan	1999	Turzillo, Mary A. (September 1999). "By Ben Cruachan". F&SF. 97 (3).		
Pride	2007	Anders, Lou, ed. (2007). Fast forward 1 : future fiction from the cutting edge. Pyr. ISBN 978-1-59102-486-6.	Datlow, Ellen, ed. (2010). Tails of wonder and imagination. Night Shade Books. ISBN 978-1-59780-170-6. Betancourt, John Gregory, ed. (2013). The sixth science fiction megapack : 25 modern & classic stories (ebook). Wildside Press. ISBN 978-1-4344-4723-4.	Nebula Award nominee, 2008
Zora and the Land Ethic Nomads	2007	Mann, George, ed. (2007). The Solaris book of new science fiction. Solaris. ISBN 978-1-84416-448-6.	Betancourt, John Gregory, ed. (2012). The fourth science fiction megapack : 25 modern & classic stories (ebook). Wildside Press. ISBN 978-1-4344-4881-1.	
Steak tartare and the cats of Gari Babakin	2009	Turzillo, Mary A. (April 2009). "Steak tartare and the cats of Gari Babakin". Analog. 129 (4): 74–87.	Turzillo, Mary (2022). Cosmic Cats and Fantastic Furballs. Wordfire. ASIN B09W4JGDJM.	

=== Poetry ===
Collections

- Turzillo, Mary A. (2007). Your cat & other space aliens. vanZeno Press. ISBN 9780978924409.
- Simon, Marge; Turzillo, Mary A. (2008). Dragon soup. vanZeno Press. ISBN 9780978924454.
- Turzillo, Mary A. (2012). Lovers & killers. Dark Regions Press. ISBN 9781937128326.
- Simon, Marge; Turzillo, Mary A. (2014). Sweet Poison. Dark Renaissance Books. ISBN 978-1605431901.

List of poems

Title	Year	First published	Reprinted/collected
If we are alone	2013	Turzillo, Mary A. (May 2013). "If we are alone". Analog. 133 (5): 37.	
Product recalls	2014	Turzillo, Mary A. (January–February 2014). "Product recalls". Analog Science Fiction and Fact. 134 (1–2): 74–75.	
The view from Cruithne	2014	Turzillo, Mary A. (April 2014). "The view from Cruithne". Analog Science Fiction and Fact. 134 (4): 53.	
