= Charlee Jacob =

American author (1952–2019)

- Born: June 2, 1952; Texas, U.S.
- Died: July 14, 2019 (aged 67)
- Occupation: Author
- Writing career
- Pen name: Charlee Carter Broach; Charlee Jacob
- Genres: Horror fiction; dark fantasy; poetry
- Notable awards: Bram Stoker Award for Novel (2005); Bram Stoker Award for Best Poetry Collection (2005)

Nell Anne 'Charlee' Jacob (June 2, 1952 – July 14, 2019) was an American author specializing in horror fiction, dark fantasy, and poetry. Her writing career began in 1981 with the publication of several poems under the name Charlee Carter Broach. She began writing as Charlee Jacob in 1986.

This native Texan is best known for her graphic explorations of the themes of human degradation, sexual extremism, and supernatural evil. Her first novel This Symbiotic Fascination (Necro Publications, 1997) was nominated for the International Horror Guild Award and the Bram Stoker Award. Her novel Dread in the Beast tied David Morrell's Creepers for first place for the Bram Stoker Award for Novel of 2005, and her poetry collection Sineater won the Bram Stoker Award for Best Poetry Collection in 2005 as well.

== Bibliography ==
=== Novels ===
- This Symbiotic Fascination (Necro 1997, Leisure 2002)
- Haunter (Leisure 2003)
- Soma (Delirium 2004)
- Vestal (Delirium 2005)
- Wormwood Nights (novella; Bloodletting 2005)
- Dread in the Beast: The Novel (Necro 2005)
- Still (Necro 2007)
- Dark Moods (Wilder 2007)
- Season of the Witch (Necro Publications 2016)

=== Collections ===
- Dread in the Beast (Necro 1998)
- Up, Out of Cities That Blow Hot and Cold (Delirium 2000)
- Skin (narrative poem; 2000)
- Flowers from a Dark Star (poems; Dark Regions 2000)
- Taunting the Minotaur (2001)
- Guises (Delirium 2002)
- The Desert (poems; 2004)
- Sineater (poems; 2005)
- Geek Poems (Necro 2006)
- Heresy (poems; Necro 2007)
- The Indigo People: A Vampire Collection (Wilder 2007)

=== Collaborations ===
- Skins of Youth (with Mehitobel Wilson; 2002)
- Chim+Her (collaborative short story collection, 2003; co-writers Mike Philbin, Destiny West, Queenie Tirone, Dawn Andrews, Brutal Dreamer, Charlee Jacob, Amy Grech, Christina Sng, Alex Severin).
- The Best of Him+Chim+Her (the best stories from Chim+Her and Chim+Him; 2005). republished by Chimericana Books.
