= Michael Arnzen =

American novelist (born 1967)

Michael A. Arnzen
- Born: Michael A. Arnzen; May 17, 1967 (age 59); Amityville, New York, U.S.
- Education: Colorado State University Pueblo (BA); University of Idaho (MA); University of Oregon (PhD)
- Occupations: Novelist; professor; poet
- Writing career
- Period: 1989–present
- Genres: Fiction, Horror Fiction, Critical Theory, Poetry
- Notable work: Grave Markings
- Notable awards: Bram Stoker Award; 1994 Grave Markings – Best First Novel; International Horror Guild Award for First Novel; 1994 Grave Markings; Bram Stoker Award; 2003 The Goreletter – Best Alternate Form; Bram Stoker Award; 2005 Freakcidents – Best Poetry Collection; Bram Stoker Award; 2007 Proverbs For Monsters – Best Fiction Collection
- Website: www.gorelets.com

Michael A. Arnzen (born May 17, 1967) is an American horror writer. He has won the Bram Stoker Award three times.

== Early life and education ==
Arnzen was born on May 17, 1967, in Amityville, New York. After a brief stint in the United States Army overseas, where he began writing horror stories to entertain his fellow soldiers, he moved to Colorado, where he began his writing career.

Arnzen received the Bram Stoker Award in 1994 for Grave Markings. Shortly thereafter, he earned a master's degree while working on his second novel, soon followed by his Ph.D. in English at the University of Oregon, where he studied the role of horror and nostalgia in 20th-century culture in a dissertation called The Popular Uncanny.

100 Jolts (Raw Dog Screaming Press) features 100 of Arnzen's flash fiction stories. His short story collection, Fluid Mosaic (Wildside Press) collects his best stories from the 1990s. His poetry chapbooks include Freakcidents, Gorelets: Unpleasant Poetry, Dying (With No Apologies to Martha Stewart), Paratabloids, Chew, Sportuary, and Writhing in Darkness. His most recent published work is Play Dead, a crime thriller with a poker theme.

Arnzen holds a Ph.D. in English and currently teaches graduate studies in Seton Hill University's Writing Popular Fiction Program and undergraduate English courses at Seton Hill University in Greensburg, Pennsylvania.

Arnzen runs Mastication Publications, an umbrella imprint for creative ephemera, chapbooks, collector's items and independently published ebooks.

== Bibliography ==
=== Novels and novellas ===
- Grave Markings (Dell Books, 2004) Winner, Bram Stoker Award Superior Achievement in a First Novel
- Play Dead (Raw Dog Screaming Press, 2005)
- Bitchfight (Bad Moon Books, 2008)
- Grave Markings: The 20th Anniversary Edition (Raw Dog Screaming Press, 2014)

=== Short story and flash fiction collections ===
- Needles and Sins (Dark Regions Press, 1993)
- Fluid Mosaic and Other Outre Objects D'Art (Wildside Press, 2001)
- 100 Jolts (Raw Dog Screaming Press, 2004)
- Proverbs For Monsters (Dark Regions Press, 2007) Winner, Bram Stoker Award Superior Achievement in a Fiction Collection

=== Poetry collections ===
- Chew and other ruminations (Mastication Publications, 1991)
- Writhing in Darkness (Dark Regions Press, 1997)
- Paratabloids (Ozark Triangle Press, 2000)
- Gorelets: Unpleasant Poems (Fairwood Press, 2003)
- Dying (With No Apologies to Martha Stewart) (Tachyon Publications, 2003)
- Sportuary (Mastication Publications, 2003)
- Freakcidents: A Surrealistic Sideshow (2005) Winner, Bram Stoker Award Superior Achievement in a Poetry Collection

=== Non-fiction ===
- Many Genres, One Craft (Co-Edited by Michael A. Arnzen and Heidi Ruby Miller) (Headline Books, 2011)
- Instigation: Creative Prompts on the Dark Side (Mastication Publications, 2013)
- Screamin' in the Rain: The Orchestration of Catharsis in William Castle's 'The Tingler' (What Sleeps Beneath, 2024)

== See also ==
- List of horror fiction authors
