= Bram Stoker Award =

Horror Writers Association annual award

- Official logo of the Bram Stoker Awards
- Awarded for: Dark fantasy and horror writing
- Presented by: Horror Writers Association
- First award: 1987
- Website: horror.org/bram-stoker-awards/

The Bram Stoker Award is a recognition presented annually by the Horror Writers Association (HWA) for "superior achievement" in dark fantasy and horror writing.

== History ==
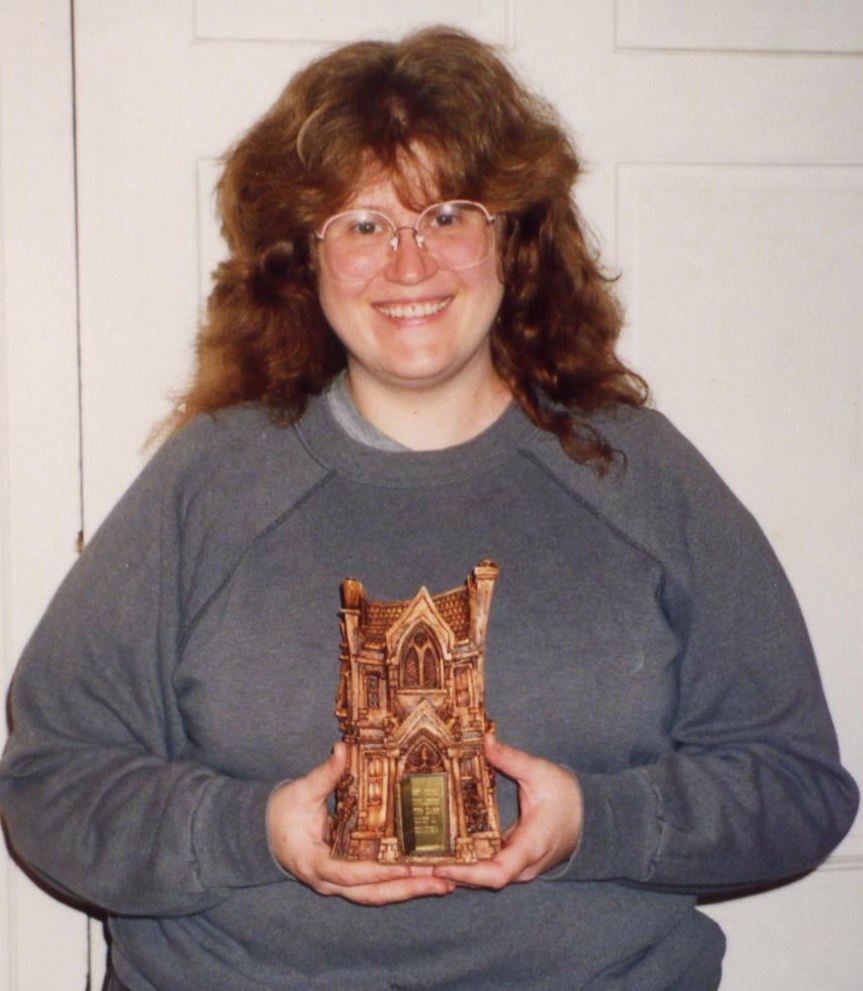
Nancy A. Collins holding the Bram Stoker Award

The Awards were established in 1987 and have been presented annually since 1988, and the winners are selected by ballot of the Active members of the HWA. They are named after Irish horror writer Bram Stoker, author of the novel Dracula, among others.

Several members of the HWA—including Dean Koontz—were reluctant to endorse such writing awards, fearing it would incite competitiveness rather than friendly admiration. The HWA therefore went to lengths to avoid mean-spirited competition, they agreed to specifically seek out new and neglected writers and works, and officially issue Awards not based on "best of the year" criteria, but "for superior achievement", which allows for ties.

Nominated works come from two different processes. Works can be recommended by any member of the HWA and a separate list of works is presented by a Jury for each category. Members with Active status then vote on works appearing on preliminary ballots. The field is thereby narrowed to the Final ballot; and Active members vote to choose the winners from that Final Ballot. Winners of a Bram Stoker Award receive a statuette made by the New York firm Society Awards.

The terms Bram Stoker Award and Bram Stoker Awards are registered trademarks of the Horror Writers Association.

== Categories ==
=== Current categories ===
As of 2026 year of eligibility, the Bram Stoker Award is presented for "Superior Achievement" in the following categories:

Category	Years awarded	Description
Novel	(1987–)	A work of prose fiction at least 40,000 words in length
First Novel	(1987–)	A novel by an author who has never published a novel in any literary genre
Young Adult Novel	(2011–)	A work of prose fiction at least 40,000 words in length, intended for audiences age 14-21
Middle Grade Novel	(2022–)	A work of prose fiction at least 25,000 words in length, intended for audiences age 8-13
Graphic Novel	(2011–)	A work of fiction in comic book for of at least 48 pages
Long Fiction	(1987–) (Note: Prior to 1998, this was known at the award for Novelette)	A work of prose fiction between 7,500 words and 39,999 words in length
Short Fiction	(1987–) (Note: Prior to 1998, this was known at the award for Short Story)	A work of prose fiction under 7,500 words in length
Anthology	(1998–)	An eligible anthology must contain at least four works of prose fiction by two or more different authors. The work must be offered for sale or distribution as a single work. The aggregate length of the stories must be at least 60,000 words. At least 60% of the fiction material must be original.
Fiction Collection	(1987–) (Note: Prior to 1998, this was known at the award for Collection)	An eligible collection must contain at least four works of prose fiction by a single author. The work must be offered for sale or distribution as a single work. The aggregate length of the stories must be at least 40,000 words.
Poetry Collection	(2000–)	An eligible collection is defined as at least 30 pages of work by a single poet, or at least 48 pages of work by no more than four poets. Long-form poetry is defined as a poem of more than 200 lines or a work in verse of more than 2,500 words. A collection may contain non-poetry elements, but poetry must comprise the majority of the titles. The word count must be 40,000 or less for a poetry collection.
Non-Fiction	(1987–)	A work of non-fiction at least 30,000 words in length
Short Non-Fiction	(2019–)	A work of non-fiction between 1,000 and 30,000 words in length
Screenplay	(1998–2004, 2011–)	A screenplay for a feature-length film or television episode. Short films and unproduced scripts at not eligible.
Lifetime Achievement	(1987–)	An individual whose work has substantially influenced the dark fantasy/dark literature/horror genre.

=== Discontinued categories ===
Discontinued categories include:

- Work for Young Readers (1998–2004)
- Alternative Forms:
  - Other Media (1993, 1998–2000)
  - Alternative Forms (2001–2004)
- Illustrated Narrative (1998–2004)

== Past winners ==
As of 2019, Stephen King holds the record for both the most nominations (33) and wins (13). Other past award winners include:

- Linda Addison
- Maria Alexander
- Michael Arnzen
- Clive Barker
- Laird Barron
- Charles Beaumont
- Robert Bloch
- Bruce Boston
- Ray Bradbury
- Christopher Lee
- Gary A. Braunbeck
- Ramsey Campbell
- Douglas Clegg
- Don Coscarelli
- Ellen Datlow
- Harlan Ellison
- Neil Gaiman
- David Gerrold
- Owl Goingback
- Christopher Golden
- Rain Graves
- Eric J. Guignard
- Thomas Harris
- Joe Hill
- Nina Kiriki Hoffman
- Nancy Holder
- Brian A. Hopkins
- Del Howison
- Charlee Jacob
- Stephen Jones
- Stephen Graham Jones
- Steven A. Katz
- Brian Keene
- Jack Ketchum
- Caitlin R. Kiernan
- Stephen King
- EV Knight
- Michael Knost
- Kathe Koja
- Sarah Langan
- Joe R. Lansdale
- Richard Laymon
- Thomas Ligotti
- Bentley Little
- Jonathan Maberry
- George R. R. Martin
- Elizabeth Massie
- Rena Mason
- Richard Matheson
- Glen Mazzara
- Robert McCammon
- Thomas F. Monteleone
- Michael Moorcock
- Alan Moore
- David Morrell
- Lisa Morton
- Yvonne Navarro
- William F. Nolan
- Joyce Carol Oates
- Weston Ochse
- Robert Ottone
- Norman Partridge
- Tom Piccirilli
- Alex Proyas
- Alan Rodgers
- Bruce Holland Rogers
- J. K. Rowling
- Al Sarrantonio
- John Shirley
- Dan Simmons
- Marge Simon
- Lucy A. Snyder
- Peter Straub
- Steve and Melanie Tem
- Robert Weinberg
- Rocky Wood
