= Horror Writers Association =

Worldwide non-profit organization of professional writers

- Formation: 1985
- Type: Non-profit
- Headquarters: Columbus, Ohio
- Members: Over 1250
- President: Lisa Wood
- Key people: Lisa Wood (L. Marie Wood), Brian Matthews, Maxwell I. Gold, James Chambers
- Website: www.horror.org

The Horror Writers Association (HWA) is a worldwide non-profit organization of professional writers and publishing professionals dedicated to promoting the interests of horror and dark fantasy writers.

== Overview ==
HWA was formed in 1985 with the help of several prominent horror writers, including Joe R. Lansdale, Robert McCammon, and Dean Koontz, although it was not formally incorporated until 1987, the year it first gave Bram Stoker Awards. The group was originally called HOWL (Horror and Occult Writers League), but quickly changed to the Horror Writers of America when they formally organized. HWA now has members and regional chapters throughout North America, Europe, Australia, South Africa, Russia, and Asia, which led to the current name of the organization.

One of HWA's missions is to encourage public interest in and foster an appreciation of quality horror and dark fantasy literature. To that end, HWA offers information on their Web site, they sponsor or take part in occasional public readings and lectures. They also maintain an official presence at many fan-based horror and fantasy conventions, such as the Bram Stoker Awards Weekend, World Fantasy Convention and the World Horror Convention.

HWA sponsors the annual Bram Stoker Awards for superior achievement in Horror and Dark fantasy. HWA also presents an annual Lifetime Achievement Award to up to three living people who have made significant contributions to the writing of horror and dark fantasy over the course of a lifetime. There are also a number of service Awards, including the Specialty Press Award and the Silver Hammer Award.

Since 1991, HWA has produced a series of anthologies edited by a few of the more prestigious members and published in hardcover, mass-market, or trade paperback by various publishers. Most have also had signed, limited hardcover editions. These anthologies present new stories by the members of the Horror Writers Association. In addition, in 1997 HWA produced a volume of essays on the craft of horror writing, On Writing Horror: A Handbook by the Horror Writers Association, edited by Mort Castle, with contributions from dozens of well-known HWA members. Their latest series of anthologies, Blood Lite, collects darkly humorous tales.

== Summer Scares Reading Program ==
In October 2020, the HWA announced its partnership with United For Libraries, Book Riot, and Booklist as it launched its Summer Scares Reading Program. The program's goal is to introduce readers to new authors and to aid librarians in starting conversations with readers. Each year, a committee consisting of a guest author and four librarians will select three recommended fiction titles for each of three reading levels (Adult, Teen, and Middle Grades) for a total of nine Summer Scares selections. Selected Summer Scares authors will be available for appearances and speaking engagements, for free, at public and school libraries throughout the country. The committee’s final selections will be announced each year on February 14— National Library Lover’s Day.

== AI Controversy ==
In August 2026, Board of Trustees member Sèphera Girón published an op-ed in the HWA's monthly newsletter defending the usage of generative AI in writing, cover design, and book advertising. The next day, the executive leadership and trustees voted to remove her from her position immediately, emphasizing "the organization’s sincere commitment to not only uplifting creators but also protecting a culture of labor compensation in the arts, aligning with principles that safeguard our community."

== Presidents ==
President	Term
Lisa Wood	(2025-present)
Angela Yuriko Smith	(2024-2025)
John Edward Lawson	(2022–2024)
John Palisano	(2019-2022)
Lisa Morton	(2014–2019)
Rocky Wood	(2010–2014)
Deborah LeBlanc	(2006–2010)
Gary A. Braunbeck	(2005–2006)
Joseph Nassise	(2002–2005)
David Niall Wilson	(2001–2002)
Richard Laymon	(2000–2001)
S. P. Somtow	(1998–2000)
Janet Berliner	(1997–1998)
Brian Lumley	(1996–1997)
Lawrence Watt-Evans	(1994–1996)
Dennis Etchison	(1992–1994)
Craig Shaw Gardner	(1990–1992)
Chelsea Quinn Yarbro	(1988–1990)
Charles L. Grant	(1987–1988)
Dean R. Koontz	(1986–1987)

== See also ==
- Bram Stoker Award
- List of horror fiction authors
- HWA Silver Hammer Award
