= Shirley Jackson Award for Best Edited Anthology =

Literary award for works of dark fantasy and psychological suspense

- Awarded for: The best psychological suspense, horror, or dark fantastic anthology of at least 40,000 words, published in English in the same calendar year
- Location: Massachusetts
- Country: United States
- Presented by: Readercon
- First award: 2007
- Most recent winner: (Tie) Ellen Datlow (Night & Day); Dan Coxon (Unquiet Guests}
- Website: shirleyjacksonawards.org

The Shirley Jackson Award for Best Edited Anthology is a literary award given annually at Readercon as part of their Shirley Jackson Awards.

== Terminology ==
In 2007, the inaugural award was given as the Shirley Jackson Award for Best Anthology. Beginning in 2010, the award has been entitled the Shirley Jackson Award for Best Edited Anthology.

== Criteria ==
To be eligible for the award, an anthology must total at least 40,000 words. The anthology must contain at least 3 separate stories by at least 3 different authors. At least 50% of the anthology must be fiction, and at least 50% of the material must be previously unpublished.

== Winners and Finalists ==
* Winners

Year	Editor	Novel	Publisher	Ref.
2007	Ellen Datlow*	Inferno	Tor Books	
2007	Barbara Roden; Christopher Roden	At Ease with the Dead	Ash-Tree Press	
2007	Del Howison; Jeff Gelb	Dark Delicacies 2	Running Press	
2007	John Klima	Logorrhea	Bantam Spectra	
2007	Jack Dann; Gardner Dozois	Wizards	Berkley Books	
2008	Sarah Eyre*; Ra Page*	The New Uncanny	Comma Press	
2008	Tom English	Bound for Evil	Dead Letter	
2008	Danel Olson	Exotic Gothic 2: New Tales of Taboo	Ash-Tree Press	
2008	Ann VanderMeer; Jeff VanderMeer	Fast Ships, Black Sails	Night Shade Books	
2008	Barbara Roden; Christopher Roden	Shades of Darkness	Ash-Tree Press	
2009	Ellen Datlow*	Poe: 19 New Tales Inspired by Edgar Allan Poe	Solaris Books	
2009	Ellen Datlow	Lovecraft Unbound	Dark Horse	
2009	Christopher Golden; Tim Lebbon; James A. Moore	British Invasion	Cemetery Dance Publications	
2009	Michael Kelly	Apparitions	Undertow	
2009	Danel Olson	Exotic Gothic 3	Ash-Tree Press	
2010	Neil Gaiman*; Al Sarrantonio*	Stories	Morrow	
2010	S.T. Joshi	Black Wings	PS Publishing	
2010	Ellen Datlow; Nick Mamatas	Haunted Legends	Tor Books	
2010	Kate Bernheimer	My Mother She Killed Me, My Father He Ate Me	Penguin Books	
2010	Jonathan Strahan; Lou Anders	Swords & Dark Magic	HarperCollins	
2011	Jack Dann*; Nick Gevers*	Ghosts by Gaslight	Harper Voyager	
2011	Ellen Datlow	Blood and Other Cravings	Tor Books	
2011	Ellen Datlow	Supernatural Noir	Dark Horse	
2011	Ellen Datlow; Terri Windling	Teeth	HarperCollins	
2011	Stephen Jones	A Book of Horrors	Jo Fletcher Books	
2011	Ann VanderMeer; Jeff VanderMeer	The Thackery T. Lambshead Cabinet of Curiosities	Harper Voyager	
2012	Danel Olson*	Exotic Gothic 4: Postscripts #28/29	PS Publishing	
2012	Greg Herren; J.M. Redmann	Night Shadows	Bold Strokes Books	
2012	Christopher Golden	21st Century Dead	St. Martin's Press	
2012	S.T. Joshi	Black Wings II	PS Publishing	
2012	Sam Weller; Mort Castle	Shadow Show: All-New Stories in Celebration of Ray Bradbury	Morrow	
2013	Joseph S. Pulver, Sr.*	The Grimscribe's Puppets	Miskatonic River Press	
2013	Jared Shurin	The Book of the Dead	Jurassic London	
2013	Jonathan Oliver	End of the Road	Solaris Books	
2013	Ellen Datlow	Queen Victoria’s Book of Spells: An Anthology of Gaslamp Fantasy	Tor Books	
2013	Steve Berman	Where thy Dark Eye Glances: Queering Edgar Allan Poe	Lethe Press	
2014	Ellen Datlow*	Fearful Symmetries	ChiZine	
2014	Jesse Bullington	Letters to Lovecraft	Stone Skin	
2014	Michael Kelly	Shadows & Tall Trees 14	Undertow / ChiZine	
2014	Ross E. Lockhart; Justin Steele	The Children of Old Leech	Word Horde	
2014	Mark Morris	The Spectral Book of Horror Stories	Spectral	
2015	Simon Strantzas*	Aickman's Heirs	Undertow	
2015	Ellen Datlow	The Doll Collection	Tor Books	
2015	Christopher Golden	Seize the Night	Gallery Press	
2015	S.T. Joshi	Black Wings IV	PS Publishing	
2015	Richard Thomas	Exigencies	Dark House	
2016	Dominik Parisien*; Navah Wolfe*	The Starlit Wood	Saga Press	
2016	Kit Caless; Gary Budden	An Unreliable Guide to London	Influx Press	
2016	Mike Davis	Autumn Cthulhu	Lovecraft eZine Press	
2016	Joseph S. Pulver, Sr.	The Madness of Dr. Caligari	Fedogan & Bremer	
2016	Kelsi Morris; Kaitlin Tremblay	Those Who Make Us: Canadian Creature, Myth, and Monster Stories	Exile Editions	
2017	Michael Kelly*	Shadows & Tall Trees 7	Undertow	
2017	Ellen Datlow	Black Feathers: Dark Avian Tales	Pegasus	
2017	Mahvesh Murad; Jared Shurin	The Djinn Falls in Love	Rebellion Developments / Solaris Books	
2017	Justin Steele; Sam Cowan	Looming Low Volume I	Dim Shores	
2017	Ross E. Lockhart	Tales From a Talking Board	Word Horde	
2018	Dominik Parisien*; Navah Wolfe*	Robots vs Fairies	Saga Press	
2018	Michael Bailey; Lucy A. Snyder	Chiral Mad 4: An Anthology of Collaborations	Written Backwards	
2018	Dan Coxon	This Dreaming Isle	Unsung Stories	
2018	Lincoln Michel; Nadxieli Nieto	Tiny Crimes: Very Short Tales of Mystery and Murder	Black Balloon	
2018	The Silent Garden Collective	The Silent Garden: A Journal of Esoteric Fabulism	Undertow	
2019	Christopher Golden*; James A. Moore*	The Twisted Book of Shadows	Twisted Publishing	
2019	Ellen Datlow	Echoes: The Saga Anthology of Ghost Stories	Saga Press	
2019	Dominik Parisien; Navah Wolfe	The Mythic Dream	Saga Press	
2019	Preston Grassmann	The Unquiet Dreamer: A Tribute to Harlan Ellison	PS Publishing	
2019	Marie O'Regan; Paul Kane	Wonderland: An Anthology of Works Inspired by Alice’s Adventures in Wonderland	Titan Publishing Group	
2020	Lee Murray*; Geneve Flynn*	Black Cranes: Tales of Unquiet Women	Omnium Gatherum	
2020	Lenore Hart	The Night Bazaar Venice: Thirteen Tales of Forbidden Wishes and Dangerous Desires	Northampton House	
2020	Michael Kelly	Shadows & Tall Trees 8	Undertow	
2020	Mark Matthews	Lullabies for Suffering: Tales of Addiction Horror	Wicked Run	
2020	Lincoln Michel; Nadxieli Nieto	Tiny Nightmares	Catapult	
2020	Mark Morris	After Sundown	Flame Tree Publishing	
2020	Doug Murano; Michael Bailey	Miscreations: Gods, Monstrosities & Other Horrors	Written Backwards	
2021	Eric J. Guignard*	Professor Charlatan Bardot’s Travel Anthology to the Most (Fictional) Haunted Buildings in the Weird, Wild World	Dark Moon Books	
2021	dave ring*	Unfettered Hexes: Queer Tales of Insatiable Darkness	Neon Hemlock	
2021	Rebecca Brewer	Giving The Devil His Due: A Charity Anthology	Running Wild	
2021	Jess Landry; Aaron J. French	There Is No Death, There Are No Dead	Crystal Lake	
2021	Ken MacGregor	Stitched Lips: An Anthology of Horror from Silenced Voices	Dragon's Roost	
2022	Doug Murano*	The Hideous Book of Hidden Horrors	Bad Hand	
2022	Michael Bailey	Chiral Mad 5	Written Backwards	
2022	Matt Blairstone; Alex Woodroe	Your Body is Not Your Body	Tenebrous	
2022	Ellen Datlow	Screams From the Dark: 29 Tales of Monsters and the Monstrous	Tor Nightfire	
2022	Vince A. Liaguno; Rena Mason	Other Terrors	Morrow	
2023	Jolie Toomajan*	Aseptic and Faintly Sadistic	Cosmic Horror Monthly	
2023	James Aquilone	Shakespeare Unleashed	Monstrous	
2023	Shane Hawk; Theodore C. Van Alst, Jr.	Never Whistle at Night	Vintage Books	
2023	Jordan Peele; John Joseph Adams	Out There Screaming: An Anthology of New Black Horror	Penguin Random House	
2023	John WM Thompson	Mooncalves	NO Press	
2024	Nadia Bulkin*; Julia Rios*	Why Didn’t You Just Leave	Cursed Morsels	
2024	Sofia Ajram	Bury Your Gays: An Anthology of Tragic Queer Horror	Ghoulish	
2024	Terry J. Benton-Walker	The White Guy Dies First: 13 Scary Stories of Fear and Power	Tor Books	
2024	Christa Carmen; L.E. Daniels	Monsters in the Mills	Interactive Publications	
2024	dave ring	The Crawling Moon: Queer Tales of Inescapable Dread	Neon Hemlock	
2025	Ellen Datlow*	Night & Day	Saga Press	
2025	Dan Coxon*	Unquiet Guests	Dead Ink Books	
2025	Gemma Amor	Roots of My Fears	Titan Books	
2025	Kristy Park Kulski	Silk and Sinew: A Collection of Folk Horror from the Asian Diaspora	Bad Hand Books	
2025	Gillian Whitaker	Were Wolf Short Stories	Flame Tree Publishing	
2025	Catherine Taylor	Were Wolf Short Stories	Flame Tree Publishing	
2025	Nick Wells	Were Wolf Short Stories	Flame Tree Publishing	
