= Bram Stoker Award for Best Anthology =

Annual award for horror writing

The Bram Stoker Award for Best Anthology is an award presented by the Horror Writers Association (HWA) for "superior achievement" in horror writing for an anthology.

== Winners and nominees ==
Nominees are listed below the winner(s) for each year.

Bram Stoker Award for Best Anthology winners and nominees
Year	Recipient	Title	Result	Citation
1998	ed. Stefan Dziemianowicz, Martin H. Greenberg & Robert Weinberg	Horrors! 365 Scary Stories	Winner	
1998	ed. Robert Bloch	Robert Bloch's Psychos	Nomination	
1998	ed. Richard Chizmar	Best of Cemetery Dance	Nomination	
1998	ed. Ellen Datlow & Terri Windling	The Year's Best Fantasy and Horror, 11th Annual Collection	Nomination	
1999	ed. Al Sarrantonio	999: New Stories of Horror and Suspense	Winner	
1999	ed. Ellen Datlow & Terri Windling	The Year's Best Fantasy and Horror, 12th Annual Collection	Nomination	
1999	ed. Stephen Jones	The Mammoth Book of Best New Horror 10	Nomination	
1999	ed. John Pelan	The Last Continent: New Tales of Zothique	Nomination	
2000	ed. Ellen Datlow & Terri Windling	The Year's Best Fantasy and Horror, 13th Annual Collection	Winner	
2000	ed. Steve Eller	Brainbox: The Real Horror	Nomination	
2000	ed. Brian A. Hopkins	Extremes: Fantasy & Horror from the Ends of the Earth	Nomination	
2000	ed. Richard Laymon	Bad News	Nomination	
2001	ed. Brian A. Hopkins	Extremes 2: Fantasy and Horror from the Ends of the Earth	Winner	
2001	ed. Richard Chizmar	Trick or Treat: A Collection of Halloween Novellas	Nomination	
2001	ed. Ellen Datlow & Terri Windling	The Year's Best Fantasy and Horror, 14th Annual Collection	Nomination	
2001	ed. Brian Keene	The Best of Horrorfind	Nomination	
2002	ed. John Pelan	The Darker Side	Winner	
2002	ed. Richard Chizmar	Shivers	Nomination	
2002	ed. Ellen Datlow & Terri Windling	The Year's Best Fantasy and Horror, 15th Annual Collection	Nomination	
2002	ed. Stephen Jones	The Mammoth Book of Best New Horror 13	Nomination	
2002	ed. Benjamin Adams and John Pelan	Children of Cthulhu	Nomination	
2003	ed. Elizabeth Monteleone and Thomas F. Monteleone	Borderlands 5	Winner	
2003	ed. Bill Congreve	Southern Blood: New Australian Tales of the Supernatural	Nomination	
2003	ed. Ramsey Campbell, Jack Dann, and Dennis Etchison	Gathering The Bones	Nomination	
2003	ed. Ellen Datlow	The Dark	Nomination	
2003	ed. Ellen Datlow & Terri Windling	The Year's Best Fantasy and Horror, 16th Annual Collection	Nomination	
2004	ed. Ellen Datlow, Gavin Grant, and Kelly Link	The Year's Best Fantasy and Horror, 17th Annual Collection	Winner	
2004	ed. Kealan-Patrick Burke	Quietly Now	Nomination	
2004	ed. Jeanne Cavelos	The Many Faces of Van Helsing	Nomination	
2004	ed. Richard Chizmar	Shivers III	Nomination	
2004	ed. Barbara Roden and Christopher Roden	Acquainted with the Night	Nomination	
2005	ed. Jeff Gelb and Del Howison	Dark Delicacies	Winner	
2005	ed. Nancy Holder and Nancy Kilpatrick	Outsiders	Nomination	
2005	ed. Stephen Jones	Weird Shadows Over Innsmouth	Nomination	
2005	ed. Julia Sevin and RJ Sevin	Corpse Blossoms	Nomination	
2006	ed. Joe R. Lansdale	Retro Pulp Tales	Winner (tie)	
2006	ed. John Skipp	Mondo Zombie	Winner (tie)	
2006	ed. Gill Ainsworth and Jason Sizemore	Aegri Somnia	Nomination	
2006	ed. John Pelan	Alone on the Darkside	Nomination	
2007	ed. Gary A. Braunbeck and Hank Schwaeble	Five Strokes to Midnight	Winner	
2007	ed. Ellen Datlow	Inferno	Nomination	
2007	ed. Jeff Gelb and Del Howison	Dark Delicacies 2: Fear	Nomination	
2007	ed. Tom Piccirilli	Midnight Premiere	Nomination	
2007	ed. Barbara Roden and Christopher Roden	At Ease with the Dead	Nomination	
2008	ed. Chad Helder and Vince A. Liaguno	Unspeakable Horror	Winner	
2008	ed. Bill Breedlove	Like a Chinese Tattoo	Nomination	
2008	ed. R. J. Cavender	Horror Library, Vol. 3	Nomination	
2008	ed. Tim Deal	Beneath the Surface	Nomination	
2009	ed. Christopher Conlon	He is Legend: An Anthology Celebrating Richard Matheson	Winner	
2009	ed. Ellen Datlow	Lovecraft Unbound	Nomination	
2009	ed. Ellen Datlow	Poe	Nomination	
2009	ed. Lisa Morton	Midnight Walk	Nomination	
2010	ed. Ellen Datlow and Nick Mamatas	Haunted Legends	Winner	
2010	ed. Maurice Broaddus and Jerry Gordon	Dark Faith	Nomination	
2010	ed. R. J. Cavender and Boyd E. Harris	Horror Library, Vol. 4	Nomination	
2010	ed. Angela Challis and Marty Young	Macabre: A Journey through Australia's Darkest Fears	Nomination	
2010	ed. Christopher Golden	The New Dead	Nomination	
2011	ed. John Skipp	Demons: Encounters with the Devil and his Minions, Fallen Angels and the Possessed	Winner	
2011	ed. Ellen Datlow	Blood And Other Cravings	Nomination	
2011	ed. Jack Dann and Nick Gevers	Ghosts By Gaslight	Nomination	
2011	ed. Tracy L. Carbone	NEHW Presents: Epitaphs	Nomination	
2011	ed. Ellen Datlow	Supernatural Noir	Nomination	
2011	ed. Frank J. Hutton	Tattered Souls 2	Nomination	
2012	ed. Mort Castle and Sam Weller	Shadow Show	Winner	
2012	ed. Eric J. Guignard	Dark Tales of Lost Civilizations	Nomination	
2012	ed. Eric Miller	Hell Comes to Hollywood	Nomination	
2012	ed. R. J. Cavender, Mark C. Scioneaux, and Robert S. Wilson	Horror for Good: A Charitable Anthology	Nomination	
2012	ed. Stan Swanson	Slices of Flesh	Nomination	
2013	ed. Eric J. Guignard	After Death...	Winner	
2013	ed. R. J. Cavender and Boyd E. Harris	Horror Library: Volume 5	Nomination	
2013	ed. Michael Knost and Nancy Eden Siegel	Barbers & Beauties	Nomination	
2013	ed. Joseph S. Pulver, Sr.	The Grimscribe’s Puppets	Nomination	
2013	ed. Sharon Lawson and Anthony Rivera	Dark Visions: A Collection of Modern Horror, Volume One	Nomination	
2014	ed. Ellen Datlow	Fearful Symmetries	Winner	
2014	ed. Chuck Palahniuk, Richard Thomas and Dennis Widmyer	Burnt Tongues	Nomination	
2014	ed. Jason V Brock	A Darke Phantastique	Nomination	
2014	ed. Brett J. Talley	Limbus, Inc., Book II	Nomination	
2014	ed. Michael Bailey	Qualia Nous	Nomination	
2015	ed. Michael Bailey	The Library of the Dead	Winner	
2015	ed. Ellen Datlow	The Doll Collection	Nomination	
2015	ed. Christopher Golden	Seize the Night	Nomination	
2015	ed. Del Howison and Joseph Nassise	Midian Unmade	Nomination	
2015	ed. Nancy Kilpatrick and Caro Soles	nEvermore!	Nomination	
2015	ed. Jonathan Maberry	X-Files: Trust No One	Nomination	
2016	ed. Elizabeth Monteleone and Thomas F. Monteleone	Borderlands 6	Winner	
2016	ed. Michael Bailey	Chiral Mad 3	Nomination	
2016	ed. Alessandro Manzetti	The Beauty of Death	Nomination	
2016	ed. Billie Sue Mosiman	Fright Mare -- Women Write Horror	Nomination	
2016	ed. Doug Murano and D. Alexander Ward	Gutted: Beautiful Horror Stories	Nomination	
2017	ed. Doug Murano	Behold!: Oddities, Curiosities and Undefinable Wonders	Winner	
2017	ed. Jodi Renee Lester and Alessandro Manzetti	The Beauty of Death, Vol. 2: Death by Water	Nomination	
2017	ed. Linda D. Addison, Kinitra Brooks, and Susana Morris	Sycorax's Daughters	Nomination	
2017	ed. Ellen Datlow	Black Feathers	Nomination	
2017	ed. Jonathan Maberry and George A. Romero	Nights of the Living Dead	Nomination	
2018	ed. Ellen Datlow	The Devil and the Deep	Winner	
2018	ed. James Chambers, April Grey, and Robert Masterson	A New York State of Fright	Nomination	
2018	ed. Eric J. Guignard	A World of Horror	Nomination	
2018	ed. Lee Murray	Hellhole: An Anthology of Subterranean Terror	Nomination	
2018	ed. D. Alexander Ward	Lost Highways: Dark Fictions from the Road	Nomination	
2019	ed. Ellen Datlow	Echoes: The Saga Anthology of Ghost Stories	Winner	
2019	ed. Jennifer Brozek	A Secret Guide to Fighting Elder Gods	Nomination	
2019	ed. Christopher Golden and James A. Moore	The Twisted Book of Shadows	Nomination	
2019	ed. Eric J. Guignard	Pop the Clutch: Thrilling Tales of Rockabilly, Monsters, and Hot Rod Horror	Nomination	
2019	ed. Robert S. Wilson	Nox Pareidolia	Nomination	
2020	ed. Geneve Flynn and Lee Murray	Black Cranes: Tales of Unquiet Women	Winner	
2020	ed. Michael Bailey and Doug Murano	Miscreations: Gods, Monstrosities & Other Horrors	Nomination	
2020	ed. Samantha Kolesnik	Worst Laid Plans: An Anthology of Vacation Horror	Nomination	
2020	ed. Sara Tantlinger	Not All Monsters: A Strangehouse Anthology by Women of Horror	Nomination	
2020	ed. Mercedes M. Yardley	Arterial Bloom	Nomination	
2021	ed. Ellen Datlow	When Things Get Dark: Stories Inspired by Shirley Jackson	Winner	
2021	ed. James Chambers	Under Twin Suns: Alternate Histories of the Yellow Sign	Nomination	
2021	ed. Aaron J. French and Jess Landry	There is No Death, There are No Dead	Nomination	
2021	ed. Eric J. Guignard	Professor Charlatan Bardot's Travel Anthology to the Most (Fictional) Haunted Buildings in the Weird, Wild World	Nomination	
2021	ed. Eugene Johnson	Attack From the '80s	Nomination	
2022	ed. Ellen Datlow	Screams from the Dark: 29 Tales of Monsters and the Monstrous	Nomination	
2022	ed. Sadie Hartmann and Ashley Saywers	Human Monsters: A Horror Anthology	Nomination	
2022	ed. Christi Nogle and Willow Becker	Mother: Tales of Love and Terror	Nomination	
2022	ed. Lindy Ryan	Into the Forest: Tales of the Baba Yaga	Nomination	
2022	ed. Sara Tantlinger	Chromophobia: A Strangehouse Anthology by Women in Horror	Nomination	
2023
2023	ed. Jordan Peele and John Joseph Adams	Out There Screaming	Winner	
2023	ed. James Aquilone	Shakespeare Unleashed	Nominee	
2023	ed. Christopher Golden & Brian Keene	The Drive-In: Multiplex	Nominee	
2023	ed. Shane Hawk & Theodore C. Van Alst, Jr	Never Whistle at Night: An Indigenous Dark Fiction Anthology	Nominee	
2023	ed. Rebecca Rowland	American Cannibal	Nominee	
2024
2024	ed. Carol Gyzander and Anna Taborska	Discontinue If Death Ensues: Tales from the Tipping Point	Winner	
2024	ed. Sofia Ajram	Bury Your Gays: An Anthology of Tragic Queer Horror	Nominee	
2024	ed. Rob Costello	We Mostly Come Out at Night: 15 Queer Tales of Monsters, Angels & Other Creatures	Nominee	
2024	ed. Doug Murano & Michael Bailey	Long Division: Stories of Social Decay, Societal Collapse and Bad Manners	Nominee	
2024	ed. Lindy Ryan	Mother Knows Best: Tales of Homemade Horror: A Women in Horror Anthology	Nominee	
2025	ed. Kristy Park Kulski	Silk & Sinew: A Collection of Folk Horror from the Asian Diaspora	Winner	
2025	ed. Julie C. Day, Carina Bissett & Craig Laurance Gidney	Storyteller: A Tanith Lee Tribute Anthology	Finalist	
2025	ed. Christopher Golden & Keene Brian	The End of the World As We Know It: New Tales of Stephen King’s The Stand	Finalist	
2025	ed. Lee Murray & Jeffrey Dave	This Way Lies Madness: Stories from the Edge of Darkness	Finalist	
2025	ed. Ryan Lindy & Stephanie M. Wytovich	HOWL: An Anthology of Werewolves from Women-in-Horror	Finalist	
