= Invaders from Mars =

Invaders from Mars is the name of:

- Invaders from Mars (1953 film)
- Invaders from Mars (1986 film), a remake of the 1953 film

- Invaders from Mars, the novelization of the 1986 film by Ray Garton

- Invaders from Mars (audio drama), a Doctor Who audio drama from 2002
