= The Clerks =

British early music vocal ensemble

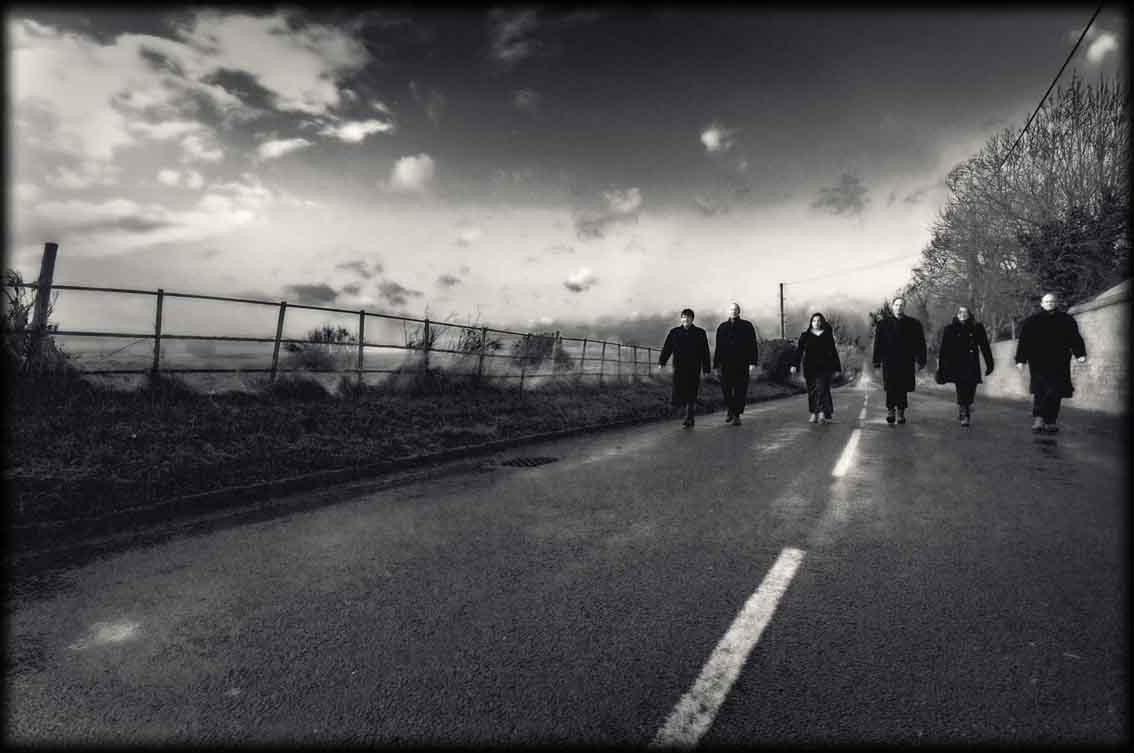
The Clerks (photograph by Colin Turner)

The Clerks (formerly The Clerks Group) are a British early music vocal ensemble. They have authored a series of recordings and concerts featuring music by Johannes Ockeghem, Josquin des Prez, Jacob Obrecht and other composers of the Franco-Flemish Renaissance.

== History ==
The Clerks were formed by Edward Wickham in 1992 from choral scholars (also known as Academical Clerks – hence the name) at Oxford University. The ensemble, whose name is pronounced like American 'Clarks', was soon signed by the record label ASV (later Sanctuary Classics). During the 1990s The Clerks’ recording profile focussed on the music of Johannes Ockeghem, whose complete sacred music the ensemble finished recording in 1999, picking up a Gramophone Award in the process. Several other recordings have focussed on previously neglected repertoire and composers, such as Jacob Barbireau, Johannes Tinctoris and Johannes Regis.

In the late 2000s, The Clerks have moved into contemporary music and have given premieres of work by several British composers, including Robert Saxton, Gabriel Jackson and Christopher Fox. They commissioned Ian Duhig to write new poems for 'Le Roman de Fauvel', which was first performed at the Queen Elizabeth Hall on the South Bank in 2007, and enthusiastically reviewed in The New York Times when performed in that city in 2009.

The Clerks have been associated with pioneering work in the field of performance practice, in particular singing from facsimiles of Renaissance manuscript sources, a process heavily influenced by the work of Margaret Bent and John Milsom. Several recordings were made in this way, and the experience has since informed the group’s approach to the rehearsal and performance.

== Discography ==
=== Recent recordings ===
- Johannes Regis: Opera omnia (2009) - 2CDs Musique en Wallonie MEW 0848-0849
- The Essential Josquin Des Prez (2007) - Sanctuary/Gaudeamus CD GAM 361
- In Memoria: Medieval Songs of Remembrance (2007) - Sanctuary/Gaudeamus CD GAU 362
- The Ockeghem Collection (2006) - 5CDs Sanctuary/Gaudeamus CD GAX 550

== See also ==
- Hilliard Ensemble
- I Fagiolini
- Tallis Scholars
- The Sixteen
