= Ian Duhig =

British poet

Robert Ian Duhig
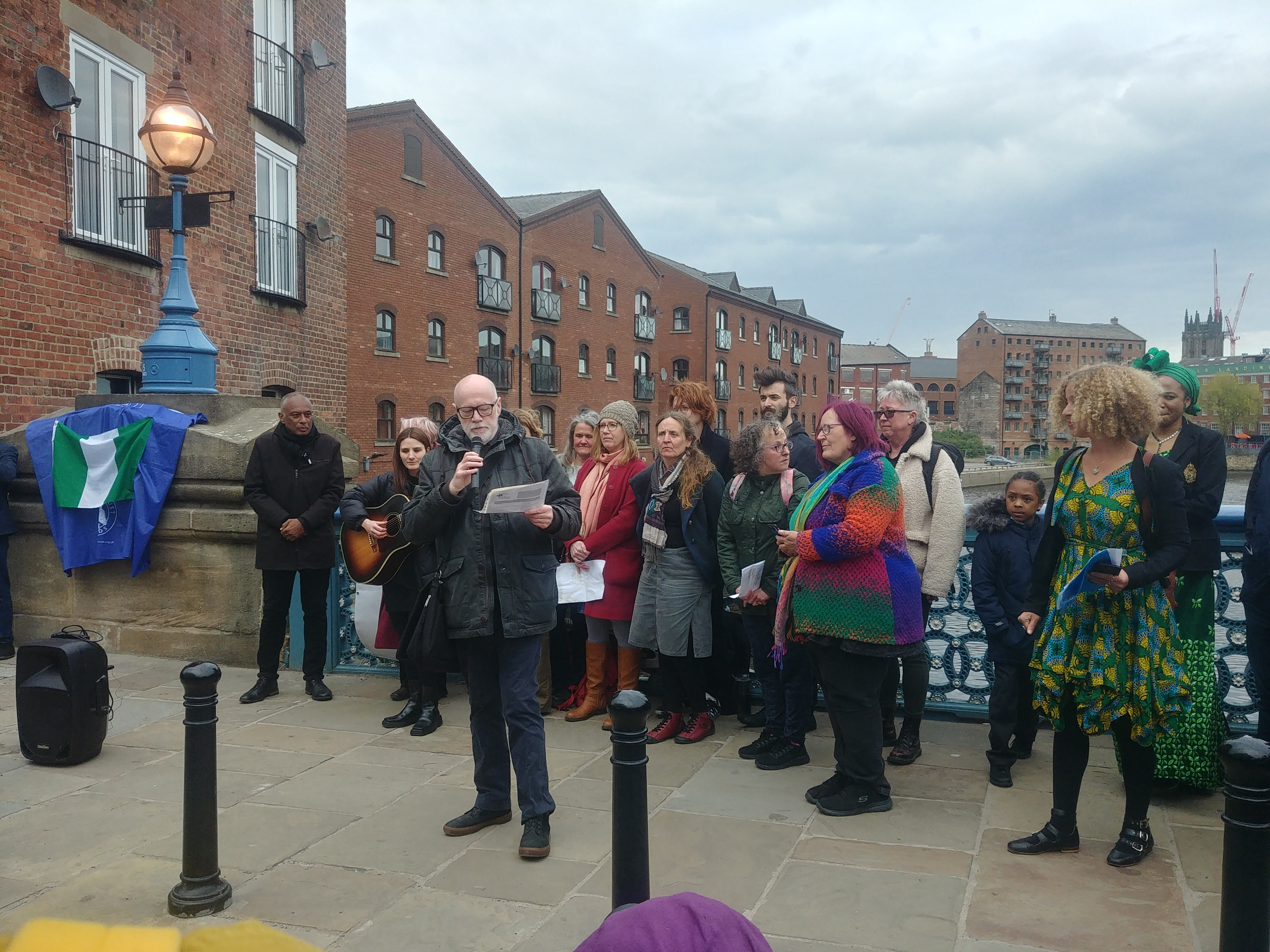
- Ian Duhig reading at the unveiling of a blue plaque commemorating David Oluwale, 25 April 2022
- Born: February 9, 1954 (age 72); London, England
- Education: University of Leeds
- Occupation: Poet
- Writing career
- Genre: Poetry

Robert Ian Duhig (born 9 February 1954 in London) is a British-Irish poet. In 2014, he was chair of the judging panel for the T. S. Eliot Prize awards.

He was the eighth of eleven children born to Irish parents. He graduated from Leeds University.

He worked for 15 years with homeless people before becoming a poet and writer.

Duhig has written occasional articles for magazines and newspapers including Moving Worlds, Poetry London, The Poetry Review and The Irish Times. He has also worked on a variety of commissions, particularly involving music. With the contemporary composer Christopher Fox, Duhig wrote "In the Key of H" for the Ilkley Festival and an insert to "The Play of Daniel", which can be heard on Fox's DVD A Glimpse of Sion's Glory. The Clerks—a vocal consort specialising in pre-baroque music—commissioned him to write new poems for 'Le Roman de Fauvel', which was first performed at the Queen Elizabeth Hall on the South Bank in 2007 and enthusiastically reviewed in The New York Times when performed in that city in 2009.

Duhig is an anthologised short story writer, represented in the award-winning The New Uncanny from Comma Press, a creative updating of Freud's famous essay with other writers including A.S Byatt and Hanif Kureishi. He has also written for the stage including a piece with Rommi Smith, directed by Polly Thomas, on 'God Comes Home' at the West Yorkshire Playhouse in 2009. This considered the ramifications of the case of David Oluwale, a homeless Nigerian immigrant to Leeds, who died after a campaign of persecution by two local policemen. Duhig has subsequently written several poems about this tragic story, some featuring in his book 'Pandorama', and continues to be involved with the David Oluwale Memorial Association. Duhig was elected a Fellow of the Royal Society of Literature in 2006.

Duhig is an uncle of Australian musician Gareth Liddiard, renowned for his work with bands such as The Drones and Tropical Fuck Storm.

== Awards ==
- 1987 National Poetry Competition for Nineteen Hundred and Nineteen
- 1989 Northern Poetry Competition for Splenditello
- 1991 Forward Poetry Prize (shortlist) for The Bradford Count
- 1991 Whitbread Poetry Award (shortlist) for The Bradford Count
- 1995 T. S. Eliot Prize (shortlist) The Mersey Goldfish
- 1998 Arts Council Writers' Award
- 2000 National Poetry Competition for "The Lammas Hireling"
- 2001 Cholmondeley Award
- 2001 Forward Best Single Poem Prize for "The Lammas Hireling"
- 2002 Forward Poetry Prize (shortlist) for "Rosary"
- 2003 Forward Poetry Prize (shortlist) for The Lammas Hireling
- 2003 T. S. Eliot Prize (shortlist) for The Lammas Hireling
- 2007 Costa Poetry Award (shortlist) The Speed of Dark
- 2007 T. S. Eliot Prize (shortlist) for The Speed of Dark
- 2016 T. S. Eliot Prize (shortlist) for 'The Blind Roadmaker'
- 2016 Forward Best Collection Prize (shortlist) for 'The Blind Roadmaker)
- 2008 Shirley Jackson Award for Best Anthology as contributor to 'The New Uncanny', Comma Press (short story)
- 2022 Winner of Hawthornden Prize for Literature for 'New and Selected Poems'.
- 2024 Poetry Book Society Choice for 'An Arbitrary Light Bulb'.
- Royal Literary Fund fellowships at Trinity and All Saints College, Leeds University, Bradford University.

Teaching Fellowships at Lancaster and Leeds Universities. Northern Arts Literary Fellow 2000, International Writer Fellow, Trinity College Dublin 2003.

- Fellow of the Royal Society of Literature

== Works ==
=== Poetry ===
- The Bradford Count. Bloodaxe. 1991. ISBN 978-1-85224-138-4.
- The Mersey Goldfish. Bloodaxe. 1994. ISBN 978-1-85224-325-8.
- Nominies. Bloodaxe. 1998. ISBN 978-1-85224-457-6.
- The Lammas Hireling. Picador. 2003. ISBN 978-0-330-49238-6.
- The Speed of Dark. Picador. 2007. ISBN 978-0-330-44655-6.
- Pandorama. Picador. 2010. ISBN 978-0-330-52124-6
- The Blind Roadmaker. Picador. 2016. ISBN 978-1-5098-0981-3.
- New and Selected Poems. Picador. 2021. ISBN 978-1-5290-7080-4
- An Arbitrary Light Bulb. Picador. 2024.

=== Anthologies ===
- 'Modern Irish Poetry', editor Patrick Crotty, Blackstaff 1995
- 'Emergency Kit', editors Jo Shapcott and Matthew Sweeney, Faber and Faber 1996
- 'The Firebox: Poetry in Britain and Ireland After 1945', editor Sean O'Brien, Picador 1998
- 'The Penguin Book of Poetry from Britain and Ireland Since 1945', edited by Simon Armitage and Robert Crawford, Viking 1998
- 'The Bloodaxe Book of 20th Century Poetry, editor Edna Longley, Bloodaxe 2000
- 'Irish Writing in the Twentieth Century: A Reader', editor David Pierce, Cork University Press, 2000
- Don Paterson, Charles Simic, ed. (2004). New British poetry. Graywolf Press. ISBN 978-1-55597-394-0.
- 'The Book of Leeds' (short stories), editors Maria Crossan and Tom Palmer, Comma 2006
- 'The New Uncanny' (short stories), editor Ra Page, Comma 2008
- 'I Wouldn't Start From Here: The Second Generation Irish in Britain' (essays), editors Ray French, Moy McCrory and Kath McKay, The Wild Geese Press, 2019

=== Editor ===
- Anthology of new Yorkshire writers. Yorkshire Art Circus Limited. 1998. ISBN 978-0-905199-01-6.
- The Nightwatchgirl of the Moon. Yorkshire Art Circus Limited. 1998. ISBN 978-0-905199-02-3.

=== Essays ===
- 'The Irish Boomerang' in Poetry Ireland Review, August 2003
- Duhig, Ian (22 March 2009). "My week; No rhyme or reason to my journeys when writer's block strikes". Sunday Times. London: Times Newspapers Ltd.
- 'The Holy City' in Moving Worlds, August 2009
- 'The Road' in 'I Wouldn't Start From Here: The Second-Generation Irish in Britain', eds. French, McCrory & McKay (The Wild Geese Press, 2019)
