= Ray Garton =

American horror author (1962–2024)

Ray Garton Jr.
- Born: December 2, 1962; Redding, California, US
- Died: April 21, 2024 (aged 61)
- Occupation: Author
- Years active: 1984–2023
- Spouse: Dawn (m. 1989)
- Writing career
- Pen name: Arthur Darknell; Joseph Locke
- Genre: Horror fiction
- Notable work: Live Girls (1986)
- Notable awards: Horror Grand Master

Ray Garton Jr. (December 2, 1962 – April 21, 2024) was an American author of horror fiction for adults and young adults. He wrote at least 68 books; the best-known, Live Girls, was nominated for a Bram Stoker Award.

== Personal life ==
Ray Garton Jr. was born in Redding, California, on December 2, 1962. He was adopted by Pat and Ray Garton, the latter being a World War II veteran. Garton grew up in Anderson, California, where he only attended religious schools. Raised in the Seventh-day Adventist Church, he had left by adulthood, calling it a "pseudo-Christian cult." Garton married his wife, Dawn, around 1989. Weeks after being diagnosed with stage-four lung cancer, he died on April 21, 2024, at the age of 61.

== Career ==
Garton was first published before age 22. In the 1980s, Garton worked for Pinnacle Books in New York City.

Growing up, Garton's media influences included Bob Wilkins' Creature Features, Dark Shadows, The Dick Van Dyke Show, Boris Karloff, Stephen King, H. P. Lovecraft, Bela Lugosi, and Edgar Allan Poe. He further credited child abuse and church-induced eschatological fears with inspiring his interest in horror fiction. Beginning with seeing 13 Ghosts, the genre was an outlet that took his then-lifelong fear "and made it fun." In 2009, he explained that horror was not his intention when beginning writing, rather "that's just what came out".

In the early 1990s, he was hired by Ed and Lorraine Warren to write a book about Carmen Snedeker, her ill son, and their family's house—allegedly a former funeral home that was infested with anal-rapist demons. After he found various Snedekers' stories to be contradictory, Garton says the Warrens told him "Everybody who comes to us is crazy. Otherwise why would they come to us? You've got some of the story – just use what works and make the rest up. And make it scary." He did so, and after A Dark Place: The Story of a True Haunting was published, Garton revealed his side of—and contributions to—the story, which was denounced by the Warrens and Snedekers. The book was oft miscategorized as non-fiction, and both the Discovery Channel (A Haunting in Connecticut) and Lionsgate Films (The Haunting in Connecticut) produced docudramas based on his work.

By August 2006, he had written over 50 books, with Dread Central calling Live Girls his "crowning achievement" at that time. By late 2019, his canon had increased to 68 books.

=== Accolades ===
Live Girls was a Bram Stoker Award nominee. In 2006, Garton was bestowed the World Horror Convention Grand Master Award.

== Published works ==
When writing for young adults, to prevent that audience from accidentally reading works not written for their age level, Garton published under the pen name Joseph Locke. He also wrote under the pseudonym Arthur Darknell.

=== Collections ===
As of May 2023, Locus listed two original collections published by Garton:

- Methods of Madness. Dark Harvest. July 1990. ISBN 0-913165-45-X.
  A collection of one novella, four novelettes, and two short stories—four original (Fat, Something Kinky, "Shock Radio", and Dr. Krusadian’s Method)—that originally sold for US$19.95 (equivalent to $49.16 in 2025).
- Pieces of Hate. Baltimore: CD Publications. March 1996. ISBN 1-881475-17-4.
  A collection of one novella and eight short stories—five original (A Gift from Above, "Cat Hater", "Bad Blood", "Ophilia Raphaeldo", and "God's Work")—that originally sold for $50.00 (equivalent to $102.64 in 2025).

=== Novelettes ===
As of May 2023, Locus listed five original novelettes published by Garton:

- Schow, David J., ed. (July 1988). "Sinema". Silver Scream. Dark Harvest. pp. 59–94. ISBN 0-913165-27-1.
- Gelb, Jeff; Garrett, Michael, eds. (January 1991). "The Picture of Health". Hotter Blood: More Tales of Erotic Horror. Hot Blood. Vol. 2. Pocket Books. pp. 37–66. ISBN 0-671-70149-5.
- Crowther, Peter; Kramer, Edward E., eds. (January 1996). "Screams at the Gateway to Fame". Dante's Disciples. White Wolf Publishing. pp. 251–278. ISBN 1-56504-907-1.
- Gelb, Jeff; Garrett, Michael, eds. (February 1997). "Hair of the Dog". Kiss and Kill. Hot Blood. Vol. 8. Pocket Books. pp. 190–216. ISBN 0-671-53766-0.
- "Tuesday: Smitten". Sabrina, the Teenage Witch: Eight Spells a Week. Pocket Archway. December 1998. pp. 63–94. ISBN 0-671-02121-4.

=== Novelizations ===
- Invaders from Mars. Pocket Books. May 1986. ISBN 0-671-62697-3.
  Derived from the screenplay by Dan O'Bannon and Don Jakoby, and based on the screenplay by Richard Blake, this film novelization originally cost $2.95 (equivalent to $8.66 in 2025), and was republished by Grafton that September.
- A Nightmare on Elm Street 4: The Dream Master. 1988.
- A Nightmare on Elm Street 5: The Dream Child. 1989.
- Warlock. Avon. February 1989. ISBN 0-380-75712-5.
  Based on D.T. Twohy's screenplay for the 1989 film, Garton's novelization originally cost $3.50 (equivalent to $9.09 in 2025).

=== Novellas ===
- The Folks. Cemetery Dance Publications.
- "Monsters". Night Visions 6. Dark Harvest. December 1988. p. 189. ISBN 0-913165-35-2.

=== Novels ===
- Seductions. 1984.
- Darklings. 1985.
- Live Girls. Pocket Books. December 1986. ISBN 0-671-62628-0.
  While working in New York City, it was a disturbing experience in a 1980s' Times Square peep show that inspired Garton to write this evergreen vampire novel. Originally selling for $3.95 (equivalent to $11.6 in 2025), it was republished by Futura (October 1987), Macdonald (November 1987), and CD Publications (October 1997).
- Night Life.
  The sequel to Live Girls.
- Crucifax. Pocket Books. June 1988. ISBN 0-671-62629-9.
  Set in the San Fernando Valley, this horror novel originally sold for $3.95 (equivalent to $10.75 in 2025), and was later republished by Dark Harvest (June 1988), Futura (January 1989), and Macdonald (April 1989).
- A Dark Place: The Story of a True Haunting. 1990s.
- Trade Secrets. Mark V. Ziesing. February 1990. ISBN 0-929480-15-5.
  A horror thriller, in 1990 Trade Secrets in hardcover sold for $25.00 (equivalent to $61.61 in 2025).
- The New Neighbor. Charnel House. July 1991. ISBN 0-927389-03-7.
  Only 500 copies of this slipcased erotic horror novel were published, with a list price of $125.00 (equivalent to $295.47 in 2025).
- Lot Lizards. Mark V. Ziesing. September 1991. ISBN 0-929480-59-7.
  This novel about a vampire prostitute was published in hardcover for $22.00 (equivalent to $52 in 2025).
- Dark Channel. Bantam Falcon. April 1992. ISBN 0-553-29190-4.
  Originally selling for $4.99 (equivalent to $11.45 in 2025), this horror novel is set in Marin County, California, and was republished by Science Fiction Book Club in August 1992.
- Shackled. Bantam Books. April 1997. ISBN 0-553-29891-7.
  A horror novel eschewing the supernatural, this story about satanists and child abuse originally sold for $5.99 (equivalent to $12.01 in 2025).
- Scissors. 2004.
- The Girl in the Basement. 2004.
- 'Nids. 2006.
- The Loveliest Dead. 2006.
- Graven Image. 2007.
- Serpent Girl. 2008.
- Ravenous. April 1, 2009.
- Bestial. 2009.
  The sequel to Ravenous.
- Meds. 2011.
- Frankenstorm. 2014.
- Loveless. 2023.
- Trailer Park Noir. 2023.

==== Young adult ====
As of May 2023, Locus listed eight young-adult novels published by Joseph Locke (with one under his real name):

- Locke, Joseph (February 1992). Petrified. Bantam Starfire. ISBN 0-553-29657-4.
  About four teenage girls are locked in a wax museum, this originally sold for $3.50 (equivalent to $8.03 in 2025).
- Locke, Joseph (July 1992). Kiss of Death. Bantam Starfire. ISBN 0-553-29653-1.
  Originally sold for $3.50, this supernatural novel is about teens and serial murder.
- Locke, Joseph (June 1993). Game Over. Bantam Books. ISBN 0-553-29652-3.
  Teens and violence mix in a video arcade named Hades, the original edition of which sold for $3.50 (equivalent to $7.8 in 2025).
- Locke, Joseph (January 1994). 1-900-Killer. Bantam Books. ISBN 0-553-56079-4.
  A young-adult non-fantasy horror novel about party line killer, it originally sold for $3.50 (equivalent to $7.6 in 2025).
- Locke, Joseph (April 1994). Vengeance. Bantam Books. ISBN 0-553-56080-8.
  A teens thriller novel that originally sold for $3.50.
- Locke, Joseph (July 1994). Blood and Lace Book One: Vampire Heart. Bantam Books. ISBN 0-553-56614-8.
  Originally selling for $3.50, this is gothic horror for young adults.
- Locke, Joseph (July 1994). Blood and Lace Book Two: Deadly Relations. Bantam Books. ISBN 0-553-56617-2.
  Originally selling for $3.50, this is the second in Garton's Blood and Lace gothic horror series for young adults.
- Locke, Joseph (January 1998). Sabrina, the Teenage Witch: Ben There, Done That. Pocket Archway. ISBN 0-671-01680-6.
  This young-adult novel is the sixth based on the TV series, Sabrina the Teenage Witch. It originally sold for $3.99 (equivalent to $7.88 in 2025).
- Garton, Ray (July 1998). Sabrina, the Teenage Witch: All that Glitters. Pocket Archway. ISBN 0-671-02116-8.
  The twelfth Sabrina the Teenage Witch novel originally sold for $4.50 (equivalent to $8.89 in 2025).

=== Stories ===
As of May 2023, Locus listed nine original short stories published by Garton:

- "Active Member". New Blood. No. 2. Chris B. Lacher. 1987. ISSN 1040-4392.
- Gelb, Jeff; Friend, Lonn, eds. (April 1989). "Punishments". Hot Blood. Vol. 1. Pocket Books. pp. 263–275. ISBN 0-671-66424-7.
- Weinberg, Robert E.; Greenberg, Martin H., eds. (November 1990). "The Other Man". Lovecraft's Legacy. Tor Books. pp. 33–52. ISBN 0-312-85091-3.
- Gelb, Jeff, ed. (December 1991). "Weird Gig". Shock Rock. Pocket Books. pp. 204–220. ISBN 0-671-70150-9.
- Chizmar, Richard T., ed. (Fall 1992). "Pieces". Cemetery Dance. Vol. 4, no. 4. Edgewood, Maryland: Cemetery Dance Publications. p. 68. ISSN 1047-7675.
- Horsting, Jessie; Van Hise, James, eds. (Fall 1992). "Choices". Midnight Graffiti. No. 7. Sherman Oaks, California. p. 70.
- Secker, Erik, ed. (August 1993). "The Devil's Music". Thunder's Shadow Collector's Magazine. Vol. 4, no. 2. Winfield, Illinois. p. 5.
- Chizmar, Richard T., ed. (Fall 1993). "Bait". Cemetery Dance. Vol. 5, no. 3/4. Edgewood, Maryland: Cemetery Dance Publications. p. 54. ISSN 1047-7675.
- Chizmar, Richard T., ed. (Fall 1997). "Second Opinion". Cemetery Dance. Vol. 8, no. 2. Edgewood, Maryland: Cemetery Dance Publications. p. 67. ISSN 1047-7675.

=== Editing ===
- With Anderson, Dana M.; de Lint, Charles, eds. (1991). Cafe Purgatorium.
- With Campbell, Ramsey; Little, Bentley, eds. (2012). Cut Corners. Vol. 1.
- With Burke, Patrick; Smith, Bryan, eds. (2017). Cut Corners. Vol. 3.

=== Other ===
As of May 2023, Locus listed two additional non-fiction works published by Garton:

- Silva, David B., ed. (Fall 1987). "Fragments of Horror". The Horror Show. Vol. 5, no. 4. Phantasm Press. p. 74. ISSN 0748-2914.
- Jones, Stephen, ed. (June 1997). "Haunted in the Head". Dancing with the Dark (biography). Vista. pp. 116–122. ISBN 0-575-60166-3.
