= Jolie Toomajan =

American writer

- Occupation: Writer
- Writing career
- Subjects: Weird, Horror
- Notable works: Aseptic and Faintly Sadistic
- Notable awards: Shirley Jackson Awards Winners for Best Edited Anthology
- Website: https://jolietoomajan.wordpress.com

Jolie Toomajan (born ) is an American author and editor. She is the winner of the Shirley Jackson Award for Best Edited Anthology.

== Background ==
Toomajan is of Armenian and Jewish descent and lives in Missouri. She holds a PhD in English with a focus on speculative fictions; her dissertation focused on the women who wrote for Weird Tales and the social conditions they wrote under.

== Career ==
Toomajan cites CL Moore's "Shambleau" as an early inspiration for her work and Margaret St. Clair as a key influence.

In 2023 Toomajan won the Shirley Jackson Award for Best Edited Anthology for Aseptic and Faintly Sadistic, She has donated the proceeds from the publication to the Chicago Abortion Fund. In 2024, Tenebrous Press recognized Toomajn's editing of Aseptic and Faintly Sadistic’ with a Brave New Weird honor in its anthology category, announced with Brave New Weird: Volume Two. In his review of Aseptic and Faintly Sadistic for Horror DNA, Zach Rosenberg called the work a “righteous font of terror and rage” and praised the story selection.

Her work has also appeared in Grim, LampLight, Upon a Thrice Time, Death in the Mouth, Apex, and Black Static.

In 2024 Toomajan became editor-in-chief of Cosmic Horror Monthly.

== Bibliography ==
=== Novels ===
- Posthaste Manor (with Carson Winter), Tenebrous Press, 2023

=== Editor ===
- Aseptic and Faintly Sadistic: An Anthology of Hysteria Fiction, Cosmic Horror Monthly, May 2023
- Cosmic Horror Monthly (2024–present), editor from issue 48, June 2024

=== Short fiction ===
- "Elizabeth Frankenstein Is the Saddest Girl on Earth" Black Static, November 2021
- "Water Goes, Sand Remains", Death in the Mouth, 2022
  - Reprinted in Brave New Weird: The Best New Weird Horror, Volume One, edited by Alex Woodroe,Tenebrous Press, February 2023
- "All the Good You Did Not Do", Apex Magazine, issue 141, November–December 2023
