= Robert Saxton =

British composer (born 1953)

- Born: Robert Louis Alfred Saxton; 8 October 1953 (age 72); London
- Occupation: Composer

Robert Saxton (born 8 October 1953 in London) is a British composer.

== Biography ==
Robert Saxton was born in London and started composing at the age of six. He was educated at Bryanston School. Guidance in early years from Benjamin Britten and Elisabeth Lutyens was followed by periods of study at Cambridge and Oxford Universities with Robin Holloway and Robert Sherlaw Johnson respectively, and also with Luciano Berio. Saxton won the Gaudeamus International Composers Award in the Netherlands at age 21. In 1986, he was awarded the Fulbright Arts Fellowship to the USA, where he was in residence at Princeton and an assistant to Oliver Knussen at Tanglewood. In 1995 he co-directed the composers' course on Hoy, with Sir Peter Maxwell Davies. He has directed the composers' course at Dartington International Summer School on several occasions and was artistic director of Opera Lab. He has also been a regular member of the BBC TV 4 (digital) Proms broadcasting commentary team and was a member of the Southbank Centre board for nine years. He is Composer in Association at the Purcell School.

Saxton has written works for the BBC (TV, Proms and Radio), LSO, LPO, ECO, London Sinfonietta, Nash Ensemble, Chilingirian Quartet, Saint Paul Chamber Orchestra, Huddersfield Contemporary Music Festival/Opera North, Aldeburgh, Cheltenham, City of London, Three Choirs and Lichfield Festivals, Stephen Darlington and the choir of Christ Church Cathedral Oxford, Susan Milan, Susan Bradshaw and Richard Rodney Bennett, Edward Wickham and The Clerks, Teresa Cahill, Leon Fleisher, Clare Hammond, Steven Isserlis, Mstislav Rostropovich, John Wallace and the Raphael Wallfisch and John York duo.

Saxton was Head of Composition at the Guildhall School of Music and Drama (1991–97) and Head of Composition and Contemporary Music at the Royal Academy of Music from 1998 to 1999. He is Emeritus Professor of Composition at Worcester College, Oxford and a Trustee of the Mendelssohn/Boise Foundation. He was awarded a doctorate of music at Oxford in 1992. His music from 1972 until 1998 was published by Chester/Music Sales, and since then by UYMP and Ricordi. Recordings have appeared on the Sony Classical, Hyperion, Metier, EMI, NMC, Signum and Divine Art labels. In 2015, he was elected an Hon Fellow of St Catharine's College, Cambridge.

Saxton's Quartet No. 3 was commissioned by the Southbank Centre, London and premiered by the Arditti Quartet in May 2011. He wrote a song cycle for the Oxford Lieder Festival for 2012 for baritone Roderick Williams and pianist Andrew West which toured the UK. Recent recordings include a trumpet concerto, 'Shakespeare Scenes', for Simon Desbruslais and the Orchestra of the Swan, released on Signum in 2014, and his radio opera, The Wandering Jew, released on NMC in June 2011.

Works include Ring Time (1994), A Yardstick to the Stars (1995), Canticum Luminis (1995), Music for St Catharine for organ (1998), a sonata for solo cello (2000), Five Motets (2003), The Wandering Jew (2010), and Quartet No. 3 (2011).

He is married to soprano Teresa Cahill.

== Career highlights ==
- 1975 – first prize at Gaudeamus Music Week in the Netherlands for What Does the Song Hope For?.
- 1977 – premiere of Echoes of the Glass Bead Game at Wigmore Hall, London.
- 1986 – Fulbright Fellowship at Princeton University.
- 1991 – premiere of Caritas by Opera North at Wakefield Opera House, Huddersfield Contemporary Music Festival.
- 1993 – Mstislav Rostropovich and the London Symphony Orchestra premiere Concerto for Cello and Orchestra.
- 1997 – Prayer before Sleep premiered at the Barbican, London.
- 2010 – premiere and Radio 3 broadcast of The Wandering Jew by BBC Symphony Orchestra, BBC Singers conducted by Andre de Ridder with soloists including Roderick Williams and Teresa Cahill.
- 2011 – CD release of The Wandering Jew on NMC

== Selected works ==
- Processions and Dances (1981; large chamber ensemble)
- The Ring of Eternity (1983, orchestra)
- Concerto for Orchestra (1984)
- The Sentinel of the Rainbow (1984; chamber ensemble)
- Chamber Symphony: The Circles of Light (1985–86)
- Viola Concerto (1986)
- Violin Concerto (1989)
- Caritas (1991; opera)
- Invocation, Dance and Meditation (1991, viola, piano)
- Cello Concerto (1993)
- Songs, Dances and Ellipses (1997, string quartet)
- Five Motets (2003, choir)
- The Wandering Jew (2010, radio opera)
- Magnificat & Nunc Dimittis (2010, choir)
- Quartet No. 3 (2011, string quartet)
- Passacaglia on the name John McCabe (2015, organ)
- In memoriam Oliver Knussen (2019, organ)
- Berceuse for a baby, on the name Ezra Clinch (2020, organ)
- Tombeau for H.B. (2022, organ)
- In the bleak midwinter (2023, organ)
- The Holly and the Ivy (2023, organ)
- Scenes from the Epic of Gilgamesh (2023, orchestra)

== Selected recordings ==
- link Caritas; Music to Celebrate the Resurrection of Christ; I Will Awake the Dawn; In the Beginning; Violin Concerto – NMC-Ancora NMC D102
- Chacony – Sony Classical SK48081
- Concerto for Orchestra; The Ring of Eternity; The Sentinel of the Rainbow; Chamber Symphony: The Circles of Light – EMI Classics CDM5665302

== Publications ==
- Saxton, Robert: The Process of Composition from Detection to Confection in Thomas, W. (ed.), Composition – Performance – Reception: Studies in the Creative Process in Music, Ashgate, 1998, ISBN 1-85928-325-X
