= The New Uncanny =

2008 horror anthology edited by Sarah Eyre and Ra Page

The New Uncanny: Tales of Unease
- Editor: Sarah Eyre; Ra Page
- Language: English
- Series: Comma Modern Horror
- Genre: Horror fiction, short story anthology
- Publisher: Comma Press
- Publication date: 2008
- Publication place: United Kingdom
- Media type: Print (paperback)
- Pages: 224
- Awards: Shirley Jackson Award for Best Anthology (2008)
- ISBN: 978-1-905583-18-8

The New Uncanny: Tales of Unease is a 2008 anthology of horror short stories edited by Sarah Eyre and Ra Page and published by Comma Press. The editors asked fourteen contemporary writers to read Sigmund Freud's 1919 essay and write fresh fictional interpretations. The anthology won the 2008 Shirley Jackson Award for Best Anthology and one of the stories, Matthew Holness's "Possum", was adapted into the 2018 film Possum.

== Background ==
Editors Eyre and Page sent Freud's essay on das Unheimliche to fourteen writers and asked them to write fiction exploring how the uncanny might apply to the 21st century. The book was first published by Comma Press in 2008 and reissued in 2018 as part of the press's Comma Modern Horror series.

== Contributors ==
The anthology features stories by:

- A. S. Byatt
- Ramsey Campbell
- Frank Cottrell-Boyce
- Ian Duhig
- Matthew Holness
- Etgar Keret
- Hanif Kureishi
- Alison MacLeod
- Sara Maitland
- Adam Marek
- Christopher Priest
- Jane Rogers
- Nicholas Royle
- Gerard Woodward

== Reception ==
The Independent named the anthology its Book of the Week in January 2009 with Peter Washington calling the effort to update the uncanny laudable. Salley Vickers in The Guardian called the project a bold idea and Strange Horizons called it a fascinating exercise.

=== Awards ===
The New Uncanny won the 2008 Shirley Jackson Award for Best Anthology, announced on 12 July 2009 at Readercon 20 in Burlington, Massachusetts.

== Legacy ==
Holness adapted his story "Possum" into the feature film Possum (2018) which he wrote and directed.

In 2020, Comma Press published a follow-up anthology, The New Abject: Tales of Modern Unease, also edited by Eyre and Page, in which the authors responding to two parallel theories of abjection as proposed by Julia Kristeva and Georges Bataille.
