= Aseptic and Faintly Sadistic =

2023 feminist horror anthology edited by Jolie Toomajan

Aseptic and Faintly Sadistic: An Anthology of Hysteria Fiction
- Editor: Jolie Toomajan
- Language: English
- Genre: Horror, speculative fiction
- Publisher: Cosmic Horror Monthly
- Publication date: 21 May 2023
- Publication place: United States
- Media type: Print, e-book
- Awards: Shirley Jackson Award for Edited Anthology (2023)
- ISBN: 978-1-0881-3018-6

Aseptic and Faintly Sadistic: An Anthology of Hysteria Fiction is a 2023 anthology of feminist horror and speculative fiction edited by Jolie Toomajan and published by Cosmic Horror Monthly. Its twenty-six stories explore the social, political and personal dimensions of "hysteria". The anthology won the 2023 Shirley Jackson Award for Edited Anthology and Laura Blackwell's story "The First Mrs. Edward Rochester Would Like a Word" won the award for Short Fiction.

== Background ==
Toomajan developed the anthology in response to ongoing restrictions on bodily autonomy in the United States and the proceeds from its sales benefit the Chicago Abortion Fund. The collection includes work by award-winning and emerging writers including Hailey Piper, Christi Nogle, Joe Koch, Kelsea Yu, Laura Cranehill and Laura Blackwell.

== Reception ==
In his review of Aseptic and Faintly Sadistic for Horror DNA, Zach Rosenberg called the work a "righteous font of terror and rage" and praised the story selection, singling out Jennifer Lesh Fleck's dystopian opening story "The Girls of Channel 9" and Joe Koch's "By Their Bones Ye Shall Know Them".

In 2024, Tenebrous Press recognized Toomajn's editing of Aseptic and Faintly Sadistic with a Brave New Weird honor in its anthology category, announced with Brave New Weird: Volume Two.

=== Awards ===
Year	Award	Work	Result
2023	Shirley Jackson Award, Edited Anthology	Aseptic and Faintly Sadistic (Jolie Toomajan, ed.)	Won
2023	Shirley Jackson Award, Short Fiction	"The First Mrs. Edward Rochester Would Like a Word" (Laura Blackwell)	Won
