= Vince A. Liaguno =

American writer and editor/anthologist

- Born: April 9, 1968 (age 58); Easton, Pennsylvania, United States
- Occupations: Writer; editor; poet; healthcare administrator
- Spouse: Brian Scott Charles (2012–present)
- Partner: Vincent Joseph Pers (1988–2011)
- Writing career
- Language: English
- Years active: 2005–present
- Genres: Horror; non-fiction
- Notable works: The Literary Six (2006); Unspeakable Horror: From the Shadows of the Closet (2008)
- Notable awards: Bram Stoker Award for Best Anthology (2009)

Vince A. Liaguno is an American horror writer, editor, and poet.

== Early life ==
Liaguno was born in Easton, Pennsylvania, the adopted son of Vincent Liaguno Theresa Rose (nee Danko) Liaguno. He was raised as an only child in the suburban New Jersey towns of Edison and Hillsborough, where he received a parochial school education through high school.

As a child, Liaguno read The Hardy Boys and Nancy Drew Mystery Stories before moving on to Agatha Christie as he entered adolescence. He cites Christie, Peter Straub, and Jack Ketchum as his formative literary influences.

Liaguno has credited his father for the development of his love for horror, in particular the slasher film, which he also has connected to his own sexuality.

After moving to the Long Island region of New York at age 20, he began his career in healthcare and eventually attended St. Joseph's University in Patchogue, New York, where he graduated with a Bachelor of Science degree in health administration. He pursued licensure as a nursing home administrator and is dually licensed to practice as such in both New York and Michigan.

== Writing career ==
Liaguno began his professional writing career in the early 2000s with an article profiling pop singer Laura Branigan for Autograph Collector Magazine in May 2005. That led to his three-year tenure at the magazine as a feature writer of interviews and profile pieces. His subjects included Jamie Lee Curtis, Meg Tilly, Janet Leigh, Stephen King, Julianne Moore, Isabella Rossellini, Cyndi Lauper, Teri Nunn, Martha Davis, Johnathan Schaech, Michael Bergin, and Marcia Cross, among others.

In 2006, Liaguno published his first novel, The Literary Six, through Outskirts Press. Conceived as an homage to slasher films, the novel won an IPPY Award (Silver) in the Horror category and was named a finalist in ForeWord Magazine’s 2006 Book of the Year Awards in the Gay/Lesbian Fiction category.

In 2007, Liaguno founded and launched Dark Scribe Press, a small press whose mission included publishing works of queer horror. The press published a total of five works—including works by Lee Thomas, Christopher Conlon, and Chad Helder—before folding in 2012. Concurrently, he launched Dark Scribe Magazine, a virtual magazine committed to promoting “dark fiction” works of horror and thrillers from presses of all sizes, and is its editor-in-chief.

Liaguno's work as an anthologist began with the 2008 publication of Unspeakable Horror: From the Shadows of the Closet, an anthology of queer horror fiction co-edited with Chad Helder. The collection, which features original short stories by Lee Thomas, Jameson Currier, Sarah Langan, and 15 other contributors, won the Bram Stoker Award for Best Anthology at the 2009 Bram Stoker Awards banquet in Burbank, California. Liaguno then edited Butcher Knives & Body Counts: Essays on the Formula, Frights and Fun of the Slasher Film (Dark Scribe Press, 2011); Unspeakable Horror 2: Abominations of Desire (Evil Jester Press, 2017); and Other Terrors: An Inclusive Anthology (William Morrow Paperbacks, 2022) with Rena Mason. Other Terrors received starred reviews from Publishers Weekly, Kirkus Reviews, and Booklist and was named a finalist in the 2022 Shirley Jackson Awards in the Edited Anthology category. In June 2023, a third volume in the Unspeakable Horror series—this one subtitled Dark Rainbow Rising—was published by Crystal Lake Publishing.

Liaguno's work also includes short story and poetry contributions to anthologies and genre publications, as well as non-fiction essays and interviews for Lambda Literary Review, Horror Homeroom, Ginger Nuts of Horror, and several anthologies.

He is a member of the Horror Writers Association (HWA) (as well as former secretary and member of the board of trustees), the International Thriller Writers, and the National Book Critics Circle. In 2009, Liaguno was awarded the Richard Laymon President's Award, which is presented annually by the HWA to “a volunteer who has served HWA in an especially exemplary manner and has shown extraordinary dedication to the organization.”

== Publications ==
=== Novels ===
- The Literary Six (Outskirts Press, 2006)

=== Edited nthologies ===
- Unspeakable Horror: From the Shadows of the Closet (Dark Scribe Press, 2008), co-edited with Chad Helder
- Butcher Knives & Body Counts: Essays on the Formula, Frights and Fun of the Slasher Film (Dark Scribe Press, 2011)
- Unspeakable Horror 2: Abominations of Desire (Evil Jester Press, 2017)
- Other Terrors: An Inclusive Anthology (William Morrow Paperbacks, 2022), co-edited with Rena Mason
- Unspeakable Horror 3: Dark Rainbow Rising (Crystal Lake Publishing, 2023)

=== Short stories and poetry ===
Dates by original magazine or anthology publication

- “The Night Nurse of Cobblestone” from Malpractice: An Anthology of Bedside Terror, 2009
- “Tyro” from Death in Common: Poems from Unlikely Victims, 2010
- “Chatroom Hustler” from Death in Common: Poems from Unlikely Victims, 2010
- “Stonewall Rising” from Zombiality: A Queer Bent on the Undead, 2010
- “Bargain Books” (co-authored with Chad Helder) from Icarus Magazine, 2011
- “Monday Shutdown” from Help! Wanted: Tales of On-The-Job Terror, 2011
- “Matinee” from Night Shadows: Queer Horror, 2012
- “The London Encounter” from Fantastic Tales of Terror: History’s Darkest Secrets, 2018
- “Shades of Madness in Paisley Patterns” from Space and Time, 2019
- “Home Theater” from Tales of the Lost, Volume 2: Tales to Get Lost In, 2020
- “Epoch, Rewound” from Attack From the 80s, 2021
- “Visiting Hours” from HWA Poetry Showcase Volume VIII, 2021
- “The Woods Are Dark” from Shakespeare Unleashed, 2023

=== Non-fiction essays, interviews, and articles ===
Dates by original magazine or anthology publication

- “Remembered Moments with Laura Branigan” from Autograph Collector Magazine, May 2005
- “Janet Leigh: Remembering an Original Scream Queen” from Autograph Collector Magazine, October 2005
- “Cyndi Lauper: Still Showing Her True Colors” from Autograph Collector Magazine, November 2005
- “Return to Melrose Place: Revisiting the Cast of the 90’s Pop Culture Phenomenon” from Autograph Collector Magazine, November 2005
- “Jamie Lee Curtis: Like Mother, Like Daughter” from Autograph Collector Magazine, December 2005
- “Isabella Rossellini: This Legendary Beauty Is a Legendary Signer!” from Autograph Collector Magazine, January 2006
- “Finally Getting Their Due: David Strathairn & Philip Seymour Hoffman Reach for the Gold” from Autograph Collector Magazine, March 2006
- “Farewell Will & Grace: The Groundbreaking Sitcom Takes Its Final Bow” from Autograph Collector Magazine, April 2006
- “Checking in with Martha Davis of The Motels” from Autograph Collector Magazine, May 2006
- “Everything’s Coming Up Roses: An Interview with TV Star Jamie Rose” from Autograph Collector Magazine, June 2006
- “Fabulous After 50” from Autograph Collector Magazine, July 2006
- “From Baywatch to Boxers: An Interview with Michael Bergin” from Autograph Collector Magazine, August 2006
- “Adrienne Barbeau: Scream Queen a Safe Bet for Two-Fers” from Autograph Collector Magazine, October 2006
- “An Interview with David DeCoteau” from AfterElton.com, October 2006
- “Catching Up with Oscar Nominee Meg Tilly” from Autograph Collector Magazine, November 2006
- “Janis Paige: The Enduring Talent of a Hollywood Glamour Gal” from Autograph Collector Magazine, December 2006/January 2007
- “Collecting by Proxy” from Autograph Collector Magazine, February/March 2007
- “Still Taking Our Breath Away: An Interview with Berlin’s Terri Nunn” from Autograph Collector Magazine, April/May 2007
- “Julianne Moore: From Daytime to Big Time – A Look at One of Hollywood’s Most Talented Actresses” from Autograph Magazine, June/July 2007
- “The Masters of Horror” (Roundtable interview with Jack Ketchum, Deborah LeBlanc, Brian Keene, and Scott Nicholson) from Autograph Magazine, August/September 2007
- “Mad About Marcia Cross” from Autograph Magazine, October/November 2007
- “From Bangor with Love: The Passion of Collecting King” from Autograph Magazine, January 2008
- “An Interview with Johnathan Schaech” from Autograph Magazine, May 2008
- “When the Artist Met His Muse” from My Diva: 65 Gay Men on the Women Who Inspire Them, 2009
- “Happy (En)Trails: Violence and Viscera on The Walking Dead” from Triumph of The Walking Dead: Robert Kirkman’s Zombie Epic on Page and Screen, 2011
- “Christopher Rice: On His New Novel ‘The Vines,’ the Gay Appeal of the Horror Genre, and Writing Supernatural Thrillers” from Lambda Literary Review, 2014
- “Wrestling with Gods and Monsters: In Conversation with Michael Thomas Ford” from Lambda Literary Review, 2016
- “What Came First the Monster or the Plot? In Conversation with Stephen Graham Jones” from It’s Alive: Bringing Your Nightmares to Life, 2018
- “Slasher Films Made Me Gay: The Queer Appeal and Subtext of the Genre“ from Ginger Nuts of Horror, 2019
- “Rejected! Ten Reasons Why and How to Avoid the Pitfalls of Rejection” from Writers Workshop of Horror 2, 2021
- “Laurie Strode: An Exploration of Trauma in the Slasher Film“ from Horror Homeroom Special Issue #5: The Neo-Slasher, 2021

== Awards and honors ==
Year	Nominated Work / Recipient	Award	Category	Result
2007	The Literary Six	Independent Publisher Book Awards	Horror	Won (Silver)
2007	The Literary Six	ForeWord Magazine's Book of the Year Awards	Gay/Lesbian Fiction	Finalist
2009	Unspeakable Horror: From the Shadows of the Closet	Bram Stoker Awards	Superior Achievement in an Anthology	Won
2009	Unspeakable Horror: From the Shadows of the Closet	Gaylactic Spectrum Awards	Best Other Work	Nominated
2009	Self	Bram Stoker Awards	Richard Laymon President's Award	Won
2019	“Slasher Films Made Me Gay: The Queer Appeal and Subtext of the Genre”	Bram Stoker Awards	Superior Achievement in Short Non-Fiction	Nominated
2023	Other Terrors: An Inclusive Anthology	Shirley Jackson Awards	Best Edited Anthology	Nominated
