= Housing Affairs Letter =

American newsletter

- Type: Newsletter
- Format: Online journal
- Owner: CD Publications
- Publisher: Mike Gerecht
- Editor: Tom Edwards
- Founded: 1961
- Headquarters: 8204 Fenton Street; Silver Spring, MD 20910; United States
- Website: HousingandDevelopment.com

Housing Affairs Letter is a news service (or newsletter) produced in Silver Spring, MD by CD Publications that covers the public, private and subsidized housing industries. It is one of the oldest continuing publications of its kind.

== History ==
Housing Affairs Letter was the first newsletter produced by CD Publications upon its founding in 1961. It began publication four years before the creation of the U.S. Department of Housing and Urban Development, and a significant percentage of its coverage since then has focused on HUD.

Over the years, HAL articles have been reprinted, referenced, quoted or mentioned in numerous periodicals and journals, including The Washington Post, the National Review, The Journal of Housing, and the Journal of Urban Law.

HAL has been mentioned in or used as a reference for many books, including:

- Problems in Political Economy: An Urban Perspective
- Where to Find Business Information: A Worldwide Guide for Everyone who Needs the Answers to Business Questions
- Leading Issues in Black Political Economy
- A Right to Housing: Foundation for a New Social Agenda
- The Encyclopedia of Housing
- The Review of Black Political Economy
- Housing Urban America
- Housing: Federal Policies and Programs
- Journalism That Matters: How Business-to-Business Editors Change the Industries They Cover
- A Different Vision
- HUD Scandals: Howling Headlines and Silent Fiascoes

Additionally, HAL has appeared in Congressional reports, in documents of city planning and development committees, and in multiple publications of such housing organizations as the Fannie Mae Foundation. In 2007, HAL appeared as "suggested additional reading" on Dr. Sammis B. White's syllabus for a class entitled "Housing Markets and Public Policy." It was mentioned alongside such respected national publications as Fortune, Forbes and the Wall Street Journal.

=== Current Coverage ===
HAL reports on the full housing industry, with emphases on HUD, Fannie Mae, Federal Reserve Board activities, Congressional legislation and Fair Housing.

=== Expansion ===
In 2007, HAL was changed to a web-based format and, along with CD Publications' other housing news services, was moved onto the web portal HousingandDevelopment.com.

== See also ==
- CD Housing Register
- Community Development Digest
- Landlord Law & Multi-housing Report
