= Kristi DeMeester =

Georgian short story horror writer

- Born: Georgia, U.S.
- Education: Kennesaw State University
- Website: www.kristidemeester.com

Kristi DeMeester is an American horror writer.

== Biography ==
Kristi DeMeester was born in Georgia, USA where she was raised in a strict fundamentalist religion household. Based in Atlanta now, she completed her masters in Creative Writing from Kennesaw State University in 2011. She has had her fiction published in magazines such as Apex, Black Static and The Dark as well as anthologized by Ellen Datlow in The Best Horror of the Year in both Volume 9 and 11. DeMeester also has published her first novel.

== Bibliography ==
Novels

- Beneath (2017)
- Such a Pretty Smile (2022)
- Dark Sisters (2025)

Collections

- Split Tongues (2016)
- Everything That's Underneath (2017)

Short Fiction

- The Beautiful Nature of Venom (2012)
- The Tying of Tongues (2013)
- The Long Road (2013)
- Like Feather, Like Bone (2013)
- December Skin (2014)
- To Sleep Long, to Sleep Deep (2014)
- Daughters of Hecate (2015)
- All That Is Refracted, Broken (2015)
- The Marking (2015)
- Everything That's Underneath (2015)
- To Sleep in the Dust of the Earth (2015)
- Split Tongues (2016)
- The Dream Eater (2016)
- The Fleshtival (2016)
- All the World When It Is Thin (2016)
- The Wicked Shall Come Upon Him (2016)
- The Rim of the World (2016)
- Floodwater (2016)
- In the Dark, Quiet Places (2016)
- Damnatio Ad Beastias (2016)
- The Sound That Grief Makes (2016)
- The Beautiful Thing We Will Become (2016)
- Slipping Petals from Their Skins (2017)
- The Language of Endings (2017)
- Abide with Me (2017)
- When We Are Open Wide (2017)
- The Wakeful (2017)
- A Sound from the Earth (2017)
- The Small Deaths of Skin and Plastic (2017)
- Birthright (2017)
- The Lightning Bird (2017)
- Worship Only What She Bleeds (2017)
- Saints in Gold (2017)
- My Sister's Omen (2017)
- "YesNoGoodbye" (2017)
- The Room in the Other House (2017)
- Learning to Drown (2018)
- Pyralidae (2018)
- Milkteeth (2018)
- A Life That Is Not Mine (2018)
- Stag (2018)
- With Lips Sewn Shut (2018)
- Golden Sun (2018) with Richard Thomas and Damien Angelica Walters and Michael Wehunt
- For Our Skin, a Daughter (2018)
- The Silence of Prayer (2019)
- A Song for Wounded Mouths (2019)
- A Crown of Leaves (2019)
- FiGen: A Love Story (2019)
- The Long Hour (2019)
- "For Every Sin, an Absolution" (2019)
- Umbra Sum (2020)
