= Del Howison =

American horror author, editor and actor (born 1953)

- Born: June 3, 1953 (age 73); Detroit, Michigan, United States
- Occupations: Film actor, author, editor, business owner
- Spouse: Sue Duncan

Del Howison (born June 3, 1953) is an American horror author, editor and actor.

== Life and career ==
Howison was born in Detroit, Michigan but moved to Los Angeles to pursue a career in acting; he appeared in low-budget horror films.

In 1995, Howison and wife Sue Duncan started Dark Delicacies, a store in Burbank, California devoted entirely to horror books, films and gifts. The store has also published a number of charity anthologies, including The Altruistic Alphabet and Conjuring Dark Delicacies (a horror-themed cookbook).

In January 2019, when Dark Delicacies had to move, film director Guillermo del Toro backed a fundraising campaign to save the bookstore.

In 2005, Howison and co-editor Jeff Gelb published Dark Delicacies: Original Tales of Terror and the Macabre (Carroll and Graf), which included stories by Ray Bradbury, Clive Barker, F. Paul Wilson, Chelsea Quinn Yarbro, David J. Schow, Steve Niles, Roberta Lannes and Gahan Wilson. In 2007, Howison and Gelb published Dark Delicacies II: Fear (Carroll and Graf).

Howison also co-edited The Book of Lists: Horror with Amy Wallace and Scott Bradley which was released in September 2008 by HarperCollins.

Howison has written non-fiction horror articles and interviews for such publications as Gauntlet and Rue Morgue magazine.

In 2010 he co-authored the book Vampires Don't Sleep Alone with Elizabeth Barrial under the pseudonym of D. H. Altair. That year he also released the book When Werewolves Attack under his own name. Both books were published by Ulysses Press.

In 2019 he wrote the hardback western novel The Survival of Margaret Thomas, published by Five Star Books.

In 2025 "What Fresh Hell Is This?" was released by Crystal Lake Publications. It is a collection of Howison's dark horror short stories through 2023.

In 2025 Howison and Duncan were honored with the Bram Stoker Award for Lifetime Achievement.

== Filmography ==
- Big Baby (2025)
- Angel With A Gun (2024)
- Transmission (2023)
- Evil Bong 888: Infinity High (2022)
- The Second Age of Aquarius (2021)
- Big Freaking Rat (2020)
- Death House (2017)
- Evil Bong 420 (2015)
- No Solicitors (2015)
- Bring Me the Head of Lance Henriksen (2010)
- Dahmer Vs. Gacy (2009)
- Ghost Hoax (2008)
- Blood Scarab (2008)
- Horrorween (2008)
- Her Morbid Desires (2007)
- The Naked Monster (2005)
- Countess Dracula's Orgy of Blood (2004)
- The Devil's Due at Midnight (2004)
- Boogie with the Undead (2003)
- Scarlet Countess (aka The Erotic Rites of Countess Dracula) (2001)
- Horrorvision (2001)
- The Vampire Hunters Club (2001)
- Blood Slaves of the Vampire Wolf (1996)
- Limp Fangs (1996)
- Lord of Illusions (1995)

== See also ==
- List of horror fiction authors
