= Possum (film) =

2018 film by Matthew Holness

- Theatrical release poster
- Directed by: Matthew Holness
- Screenplay by: Matthew Holness
- Based on: Possum by Matthew Holness
- Produced by: Wayne Marc Godfrey; James Harris; Robert Jones; Mark Lane
- Starring: Sean Harris; Alun Armstrong
- Cinematography: Kit Fraser
- Edited by: Tommy Boulding
- Music by: The Radiophonic Workshop
- Production companies: BFI Film Fund; Dark Sky Films
- Distributed by: Dark Sky Films
- Release dates: 25 June 2018 (Edinburgh International Film Festival); 26 October 2018 (United Kingdom)
- Running time: 85 minutes
- Country: United Kingdom
- Language: English
- Box office: $33,271

Possum is a 2018 British psychological horror film written and directed by Matthew Holness in his feature film debut, starring Sean Harris and Alun Armstrong. It centres on a disgraced children's puppeteer who returns to his childhood home and is forced to confront trauma he suffered there.

Possum is an adaptation of Holness' short story of the same name, published in the horror anthology The New Uncanny: Tales of Unease, and partially inspired by the theories on the uncanny by Sigmund Freud. Holness soon forgot about the idea of adapting the story until he had begun working on developing a possible horror film. As a fan of the horror genre, Holness stated he much preferred horror films that resonate with the audience and force them to reflect on the experience afterward. Possum's visual style was inspired by public information films Holness saw in his youth. Other inspirations include Dead of Night (1945), George A. Romero's Martin (1978), and German Expressionist films. Filming began in Norfolk, with additional filming taking place in Great Yarmouth and Suffolk. The film's score was composed by sound effects and experimental electronic music studio The Radiophonic Workshop, which marked their first soundtrack purposely constructed for a feature film.

Possum premiered at the Edinburgh International Film Festival on 25 June 2018, and later screened in the United States at the Brooklyn Horror Film Festival on 12 October 2018. It was later given a limited theatrical release in the United States, opening in five theatres on 2 November 2018; finishing its limited theatrical run with a gross of $33,271. Later, it was given a home media release. In addition to garnering multiple awards and nominations, it was generally praised by critics for Harris' performance, the film's atmosphere, score, and unsettling imagery, though the story prompted some criticism.

== Plot ==
Philip Connell, a disgraced children's puppeteer, is forced to return to his childhood home in Norfolk. The home, in disrepair due to a past fire, is shared by his decrepit uncle Maurice.

Philip is haunted by a spider-like marionette called "Possum." Throughout his time in Norfolk, he repeatedly attempts to dispose of the puppet, but it inexplicably returns to him each time. Philip recovers a picture book he made as a young boy. The book depicts Possum's origins and how it creeps upon unsuspecting, orphaned children, intent on devouring them in their beds. He is also plagued by strange visions and dreams of Possum creeping up on him in bed. Philip continues trying - and failing - to dispose of Possum.

During their interactions, Maurice frequently torments Philip by mentioning the circumstances that cost him his job and forcing Philip to recount traumatic experiences of childhood bullying. He laments Philip's attempts to dispose of Possum, reminding him that puppetry runs in their family. Philip frequently approaches a closed room in the house. Each time, Maurice asks if he plans to go in, to which he always replies no.

News reports mention a missing local boy, Michael, whom Philip encountered on the train ride to Norfolk. Authorities indicate that a man fitting Philip's description is a person of interest. Philip revisits his childhood school, though he is discouraged from lingering by the school's staff and treated with suspicion by the local residents. Maurice remarks to Philip that there was once a similar case of a boy being assaulted by a masked man. When Philip breaks down in tears, Maurice comforts him. As the search continues to mount, Maurice informs Philip that he will be spending some time away and warns Philip to not bring attention to himself, or trouble back to the house.

In a period of distress, Philip enters the school and requests to speak to his old form teacher, Mr. Grant. He tells the secretary that Mr. Grant "knew all about what had happened" and promised to go to the police with him. The confused secretary has him wait outside, but Philip overhears her speaking with the headmaster about calling the police and he flees. As he runs, Philip finds himself chased by Possum, until he is seemingly overwhelmed by it, and passes out. Awakening, he returns home to find Maurice gone, but now has horrifying visions of becoming Possum himself.

Philip enters the closed room, which is revealed to be badly charred from the fire. As he examines the items within, he is attacked by a masked man, who reveals himself to be Maurice. He lewdly taunts Philip about the deaths of his parents, which left him orphaned and in Maurice's care. He muses about how Philip always knew Maurice was the masked man who physically and sexually abused him throughout his childhood, but still never told anyone.

Maurice gleefully beats and molests a sobbing and mentally-regressed Philip. Suddenly, Philip hears a whimper from a locked chest in the corner. He overpowers Maurice and breaks his neck. Philip unlocks the chest, releasing a terrified Michael who scrambles away.

Sitting outside his house, Philip stares blankly ahead, with Possum's severed head in his lap.

== Cast ==
- Sean Harris as Philip Connell, a disgraced and mentally unstable children's puppeteer haunted by the traumatic abuse he suffered as a child at the hands of his uncle
- Alun Armstrong as Maurice, Phillip's abusive uncle who raised Phillip after the death of his parents
- Charlie Eales as Michael, a young boy who goes missing
- Simon Bubb as Mr. Evans
- Andy Blithe as Michael's Father
- Ryan Enever as Michael's Uncle

== Production ==
=== Concept and development ===
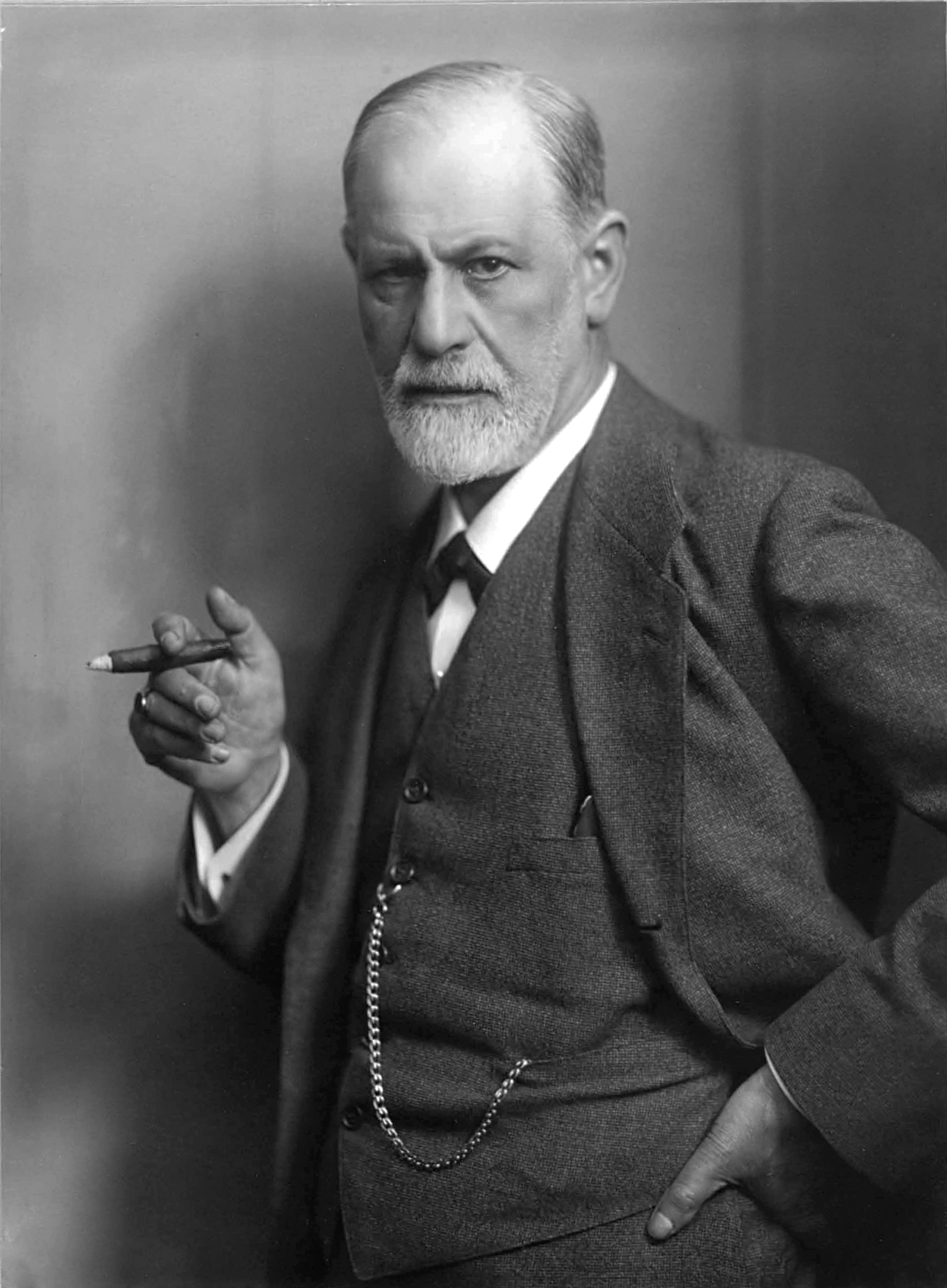
Both Holness' original short story and the subsequent adaptation was partially based upon the theories of the uncanny by psychologist Sigmund Freud.

Possum marks the feature film debut of English comedian, author, and director Matthew Holness. Holness had previously worked on the cult television series Garth Marenghi's Darkplace, which he wrote, directed, and starred in as the title character, as well as the publication of several short stories. Although normally associated with comedies, Holness admitted he had always been a fan of the horror genre and works with serious themes, but stressed that it had been difficult to break from his reputation for comedies due to the large following.

The film is an adaptation of Holness' own short story of the same name, which was published in the horror anthology The New Uncanny: Tales of Unease, and featured the publications of other writers. The story centered on a character unable to verbally and emotionally express himself due to childhood trauma, choosing instead to do so by creating a puppet. The basis for the story was partially drawn from theories on the uncanny by Sigmund Freud. According to Holness, The New Uncanny's publishers had all the writers read Freud's theory of the uncanny. The publishers then told the writers to choose a fear that intrigued them, and write a story in modern language. Holness ended up choosing two, a fear of doppelgängers and a fear of ventriloquists' dummies, combining the two fears to avoid being clichéd. After the story's publication, Holness soon forgot about the idea until he had begun working on developing a possible horror film. Expanding the short story into a film narrative, Holness drew upon his love of 1920s and '30s silent films, which he found to be "so brilliantly creepy", with the primary use of psychologically affecting body horror visual narratives. He wanted to replicate this same filmmaking technique, lamenting that many modern films overlooked them and ended up being less creepy. Opting to make "a modern silent film", Holness was then reminded of the original short story, which he felt would fit perfectly with his idea to express as little dialogue as possible.

The film's visual style was inspired by public information films that Holness had seen during his youth. These films, which were intended to shock youth out of making bad decisions, often depicted children being kidnapped, maimed, and/or killed. The films deeply disturbed Holness, who later recalled, "They were put on between children's programming during the day; you'd see these horrific, terrifying films – you got the impression that the adult world was a very tribal place. Of course, now we know several of those films are fronted by real-life monsters." Further inspiration for the film came from silent films such as F.W. Murnau's Nosferatu (1922). Holness also listed films such as George A. Romero's Martin (1978), and Dead of Night (1945) as inspirations for the film. When the film was originally announced, Holness stated in an interview with Screen Daily, "The film draws on the dark nightmares of silent German expressionist horror, British classics such as The Innocents (1961) and Don't Look Now (1973), as well as the claustrophobic suburban gothic of Pete Walker's Frightmare (1974).

=== Pre-production ===
"It was important for me to not give the audience those safety nets, to not allow them to feel like they knew where they were."

— Writer-director Matthew Holness on the development of the film's script

In June 2016 Holness announced the film's development. On 3 November 2016 it was officially announced that Holness was writing and directing the film. In an interview with PopMatters, Holness stated that writing the film's script involved extending the narrative from his original short story: "Short stories are different because they can be very short, they can be just about one scene, one place, one sole thing happening. Certainly with Possum I knew I needed to extend the narrative a bit, to widen it in order for it to be a film in which nothing much on the face of it happens. It needed a bigger sense of climax and confrontation than the original story had, even though the essentials of the short story are in the film." As a fan of the horror genre, Holness stated that he much preferred horror films that "linger with you", forcing the audience to reflect upon the experience afterwards. It was originally decided that intertitles would be used to voice the main character's thoughts throughout the film, with Holness drawing inspiration from the narration of silent films. The idea was later abandoned during the editing process, as Holness felt it slowed down the pacing of the film, instead opting for voice-over narration as he felt the audience could better understand the meaning behind such narration.

Developing the characters in the film, Holness stated that he wanted to "get into the heads of the characters", describing the film as "a very bleak and understated character piece." Holness stressed the importance of making the film 'through Philip's perspective of the world', ensuring that the character remained morally ambiguous. The role of Phillip was originally written with the intention of having John Amplas, who had starred in George Romero's Martin, in the lead role. The role instead went to Sean Harris, who had responded strongly to the idea of starring in the film after reading the script. Initially, Holness had been concerned whether the actor would be able to go to such an emotionally dark place: "the great thing about Sean is that he immerses himself in his characters and is able to go to those places and come back with something that's very affecting and truthful." Holness worked very closely with Harris on developing the character of Phillip, as Holness later recalled "We did a lot of prep work together, discussing Phillip and where he'd come from and what he'd been through, and Sean wasn't really interested in the horror side of it so much as he was getting to the truth of this character and expressing what he'd gone through for the audience." Alun Armstrong was also cast as Phillip's uncle Maurice, after originally turning it down due to scheduling conflicts for another project he was shooting in the United States.

=== Creature design ===
Actor Sean Harris with the Possum puppet. The practical model for the puppet was designed by Odd Studios, and was inspired by Holness' fear of spiders

The film's Possum puppet was designed by Sydney-based Odd Studios. The studio had previously contributed to the productions of Star Wars: Episode II – Attack of the Clones (2002), Alien: Covenant (2017), Mad Max: Fury Road (2015), and Pirates of the Caribbean: Dead Men Tell No Tales (2017). The idea behind the creation of the puppet came from his own fear of spiders, while clarifying that in the original short story, the Possum was made by Phillip, who constructed it out of pieces of roadkill, and dead animals, with Holness comparing the design to that of the Frankenstein's Monster. While developing the character for the film, Holness felt that the puppet's original design was "too much", prompting the decision to conceal the creature's design for as long as possible. Part of the decision to cut back on the character's screen time came from Holness' feelings that the audience would become desensitized to the puppet's horrific appearance and thus not be as effective. As Holness later stated in an interview, "You can see something horrific, but once you've seen it, the effect wears off, which is why we kept so much of it as secret as possible."

Holness worked closely with designer and close friend Dominic Hailstone on coming up with the puppet's final design. Macabre artworks and taxidermy were heavily referenced during the design process. As creature design supervisor Adam Johansen later stated in an interview, "We tried to achieve a very home made feel for Possum but one that is twisted and disturbing." Using the film's script, Hailstone constructed storyboards showing possible designs for the character, which he then presented to the writer-director. The character's initial design proved to be not as effective as originally thought, with Holness feeling that the puppet's face was "too expressive." With only a week before filming was scheduled to commence, Holness and Hailstone came up with the idea of having the character's face be inexpressive in which the audience could project their own fears onto it. Hailstone then sculpted the Possum's face, which was made to resemble Harris' character, in three to four hours, with Holness approving the final design. The film's reasonably low budget and tight production schedule limited the amount of time that the studio could spend on designing and constructing the character. The head, neck, and body of the Possum was constructed as a simple hand and rod puppet, with the body constructed out of foam latex and the head made out of fiberglass. The puppet's eight spidery legs were designed by Damian Martin, who constructed a jointed armature using multiple pick points of semi-rigid urethane, so that the puppeteering rods could be attached in multiple angles, and sides to allow more range and freedom while operating it. The puppet's complexity, including its eight fragile limbs, required multiple puppeteers to operate it during filming and presented numerous challenges.

=== Filming ===
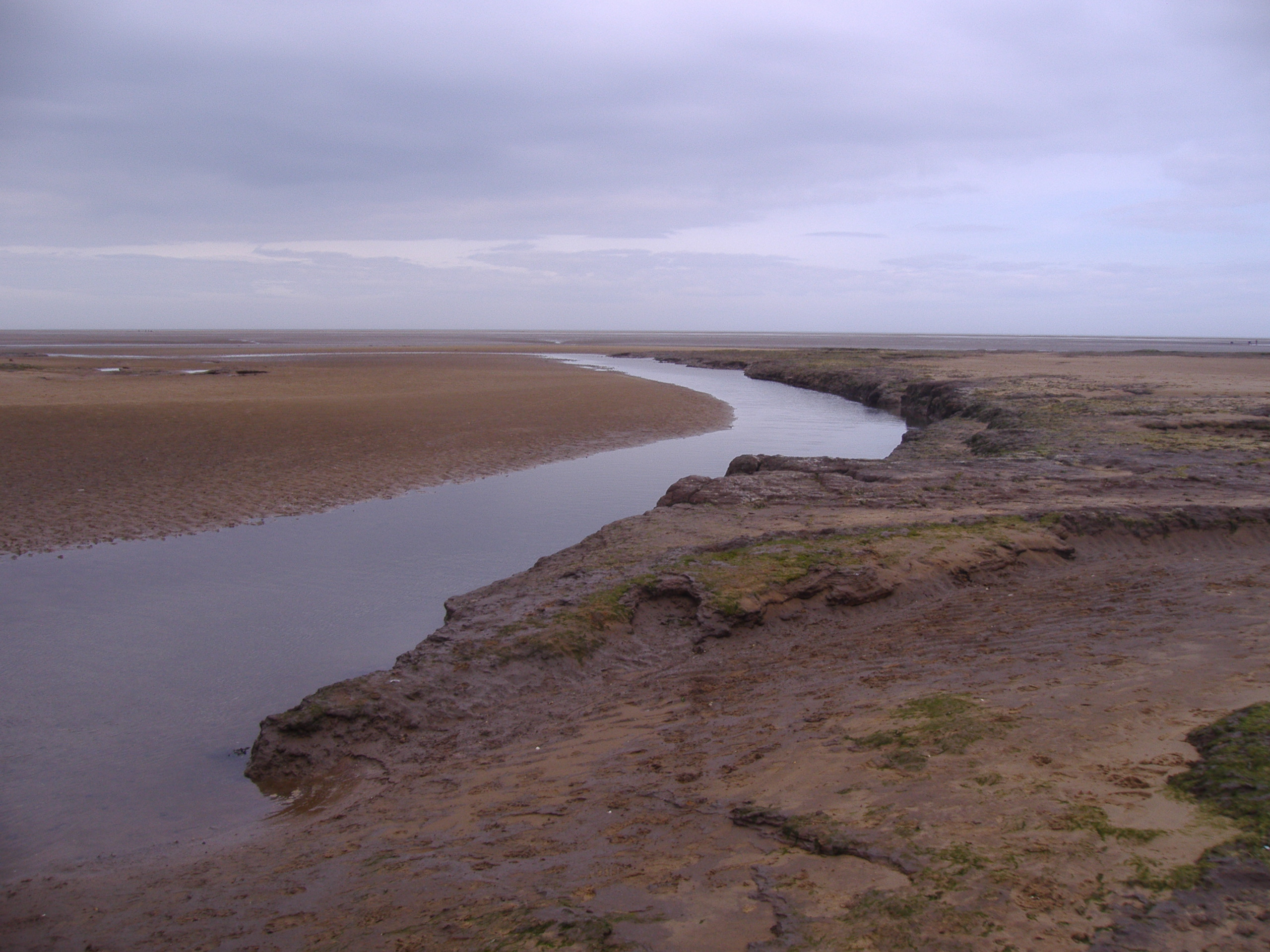
The marshes located in Stiffkey, Norfolk served as one of the film's shooting locations.

Principal photography began on 28 November 2016, with shooting locations occurring mostly in Norfolk. Additional filming took place in Great Yarmouth, and Suffolk, with Holness referring to the locations as "stunning and completely unique." The film was shot on a Kodak 35mm film, with Kit Fraser as the film's cinematographer, and production design by Charlotte Pearson.

The setting of the original short story was based on a stretch of the coast in Kent near Whitstable. However, the setting was later changed to Norfolk, due to its similarities and atmosphere, the latter of which Holness stated contributed to the overall mood and feel of the film. He would later discover that the Stiffkey marshes, one of the locations where the crew had filmed, was where the fabled Black Shuck was purported to haunt. Holness later describe the shooting experience as dark and very intense, stating, "there were many scenes in this film that were incredibly difficult and intense to shoot, particularly the final scene. They were dark and depressing to shoot, but that's where the truth of those scenes comes out."

Harris, a method actor of Stanislavski's system, would remain in character throughout the entirety of shooting to the point where the director felt that he was working with Phillip rather than Harris. Having only worked in television, Holness stated that the biggest difference in directing a feature film, for him, was the opportunity to work with "proper actors", who had a different discipline as opposed to television. The director also learned early in principal photography that he didn't need to shoot that many takes for scenes with Harris, as the actor "usually nailed it straight away." Both Harris and Armstrong only interacted with each other while filming their scenes together, as they wanted to create a genuine feeling of separation and tension.

=== Music ===
Possum features an original score constructed by the sound effects and experimental electronic music studio The Radiophonic Workshop, their first for a feature film. The score featured 29 tracks in total, that consisted of the studio's work and some unreleased alternate cues composed by Delia Derbyshire, the original studio member. It was released on 30 November 2018 through CD and digital download, and a vinyl edition was released during the Record Store Day 2021.

== Release ==
Possum made its premiere at the Edinburgh International Film Festival on 25 June 2018. It was later screened at the Galway Film Fleadh on 11 July, and on 27 August at the London FrightFest Film Festival. The film was later released theatrically in the United Kingdom on 26 October 2018. That same day, the film was screened at the Dead of Night Film Festival in Liverpool. On 15 November it was screened at the Mayhem Film Festival in the Broadway Cinema. The screening was followed by a question and answer session with Holness, which was hosted by Steven Sheil.

The film premiered in the United States at the Brooklyn Horror Film Festival on 12 October 2018. It received a limited theatrical release, opening in five theaters in the United States on 2 November 2018. Later, Possum was released via video on demand in the United States on 2 November 2018, coinciding with the film's limited theatrical release that same day. The film was released in the United States on DVD by Dark Sky Films on 12 February 2019. It was later released in the United Kingdom on DVD, Blu-ray and Digital HD by Bulldog Films on 4 March 2019.

== Reception ==
=== Box office ===
Possum was given a limited theatrical release in the United Kingdom on 26 October 2018, opening in seven theaters. It grossed a total of $11,596 during its opening weekend. During its second weekend, the film grossed a total of $4,075. The film would eventually attain a total gross of $33,225 by the end of its theatrical run.

=== Critical response ===
On review aggregator Rotten Tomatoes, Possum holds an approval rating of 88%, based on 43 reviews, and an average rating of 7.70. Its consensus reads: "Unsettling and absorbing in equal measure, Possum presents a dark character study rich with rewards for fans of chilling genre fare." On Metacritic, the film has a weighted average score of 64 out of 100, based on 5 critics, indicating "generally positive reviews". Reviews have generally praised the film for its atmosphere, cinematography, and score, and Harris' performance as the haunted puppeteer Phillip receiving almost universal praise. However, the film's story received some criticism, for its minimalist approach and 'unsatisfying' finale.

"Possum excels in ways some horror doesn't. It strikes the nerve between horror and emotion, between wanting to cry and wanting to scream.—It's a work of creeping revulsion that leaves you feeling stunned and traumatized, ultimately confronting you with truths that feel all too real."

— Katie Driscoll of the Starburst Magazine

Kim Newman of Empire praised Harris' performance, writing: "A disturbing, curiously beautiful British horror exercise. Recommended, but with a warning: next time you wake up in the middle of the night, you'll find Possum at the end of the bed." Peter Bradshaw from The Guardian called it "deadly serious, but carries with it an echo or ghost of how this same material could have been played as ironic black comedy." Neil Young of The Hollywood Reporter called it "a serious and dark journey into the labyrinths of cruelty and abuse", commending the film's acting and production design. Den of Geek's Daniel Kurland hailed the film as "the very best kind of psychological thriller that just continues to drill deeper into the same rich territory", praising Harris' performance, visuals, and its examination of trauma and abuse. Joseph Marczynski of Vice called it "deeply disturbing" and wrote, "Rich in symbolism but sparse in dialogue, Possum is a haunting and otherworldly exploration of Phillip's psyche as he struggles to shed the trauma of childhood abuse." Mark Butler from iNews praised the film's surreal atmosphere, unsettling imagery, soundtrack, and Harris' performance; calling it "a distinctly non-humorous, deeply unsettling psychological horror that leaves a thoroughly haunting impression." Dennis Harvey of Variety praised Harris' and Armstrong's performances, atmosphere, soundtrack and the "striking aesthetic". In his review, Harvey wrote: "Fans of conventional horror will no doubt sigh with boredom over the lack of action, but more adventurous viewers may lend this modest but distinctive enterprise its own eventual cult following." Ben Robins and Olly Richards from Time Out London praised Harris' performance, and wrote: "Icky and unsettling, this British horror film crawls under your skin." Highlighting the film's acting, unsettling imagery and sound design, Bloody Disgusting's Meredith Borders felt that the film's unconventional approach to its story made the film all the more unsettling.

The film was not without its detractors. Pat Brown from Slant gave the film a negative review, criticizing the film's sparsely written script and finale, while commending the film's atmosphere and haunting imagery. Concluding his review, Brown wrote: "Possum builds toward a revelation, but for such a visually oriented, sparsely written film, that revelation is surprisingly reliant on dialogue. As a result, there's little payoff for all the repetitive series of evocative visions and mute stares." Rich Cline from Shadows on the Wall praised the performances, but criticized the characters and situations as having "very little definition", concluding that the film was "definitely creepy, and often very yucky, but it's far too pretentious to be scary." Dave Aldridge of the Radio Times said the film was "too downright weird", but commended Harris' and Armstrong's performances.

=== Accolades ===
Award	Date of ceremony	Category	Recipient(s) and nominee(s)	Result	Ref.
Brooklyn Horror Film Festival Awards	25 October 2018	Best Actor	Sean Harris	Won	
Brooklyn Horror Film Festival Awards	25 October 2018	Best Supporting Actor	Alun Armstrong	Won	
Brooklyn Horror Film Festival Awards	25 October 2018	Best Cinematography	Kit Fraser	Won	
Fangoria Chainsaw Awards	21 October 2018	Best Creature FX	Adam Johansen	Nominated	
Golden Trailer Awards	28 May 2019	Best Foreign Horror Trailer	Bankside Films	Nominated	

== Legacy ==
In the years following its release, various media outlets have included Possum in their lists of the top horror films within the last five years. Horror film magazine Fangoria has also praised the film as one of the best horror films within the past decade. In 2019, Scott Weinberg of the entertainment website Thrillist included the film in his list of "The Best Horror Movies of 2018", favorably comparing it to the works of David Lynch and David Cronenberg.

Entertainment website Screen Rant included the film in their list of "10 Intense British & Irish Horror Movies That You've Probably Never Heard Of". Online publication Comic Book Resources placed the film at 7th place in their list of "The 25 Best Horror Movies Created in the Last 5 Years", with the site summarizing the film as "a delicate meditation on repressed trauma that's expressed through a troubled man's return home and the grim object that he embraces." In their celebration of the Halloween season, Polygon listed the film as a part of their "10 underrated horror movies to feast on this month". Collider placed it at No. 3 of its "10 Best British Horror Movies", describing it as "one of Britain's best and most powerful modern horror films".

== See also ==
- Friend of the World (2020), a film that relies on dialogue between two leads and is similarly unsettling to Possum.
- Magic (1978), a film with a similar premise of a delusional man whose puppet comes to life
