= Eric J. Guignard =

American novelist

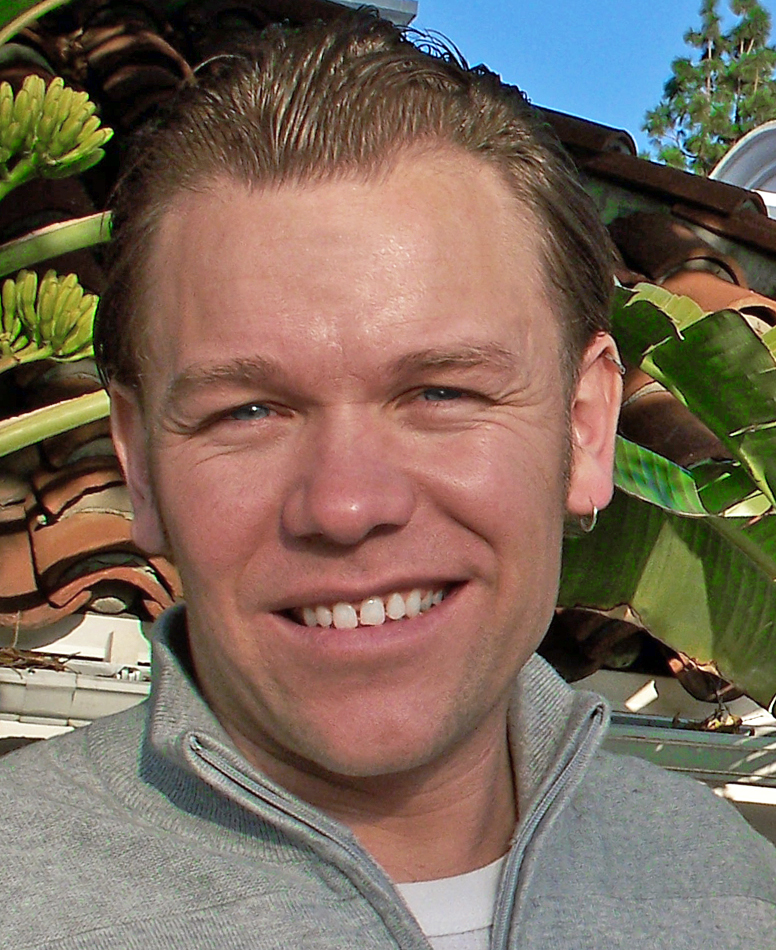
- Guignard in 2011
- Born: December 20, 1975 (age 50); Montebello, California, U.S.
- Occupations: horror author, publisher
- Spouse: Jeannette
- Children: 2
- Website: www.ericjguignard.com

Eric J. Guignard (born December 20, 1975, in Montebello, California) is an American horror, dark fantasy, and literary fiction anthologist, editor, and author. He is a lifelong resident of Southern California, and teaches Technical Writing through the University of California system.

== Career ==
=== As an author ===
Eric J. Guignard has written and published over two hundred short stories including "Experiments in An Isolation Tank," published in the 2012 anthology titled Chiral Mad by Written Backwards.; "The Tall Man," published in Shock Totem.; and "A Case Study in Natural Selection and How it Applies to Love," published in Black Static. His non-fiction works include "The H Word: Horror Fiction of Tomorrow," published in Nightmare Magazine.

=== As an editor ===
In 2017, he purchased the small press company Dark Moon Books. Under this imprint, he has released several anthologies including A World of Horror and After Death... which won a Bram Stoker Award for Best Anthology.

The press also published a series of introductory primers titled Exploring Dark Short Fiction: A Primer to.... Each release in this series promotes a specific author, including Steve Rasnic Tem (2017), Kaaron Warren (2018), Nisi Shawl (2018), Jeffrey Ford (2019), Han Song (2020), Ramsey Campbell (2021), and Gemma Files (2025).

Guignard also served as general editor of the Haunted Library of Horror Classics, co-edited with Leslie S. Klinger) and published by the Horror Writers Association and Poisoned Pen Press/Sourcebooks. The series consisted of Phantom of the Opera by Gaston Leroux, followed by The Beetle by Richard Marsh, Vathek by William Beckford, House on the Borderlands by William Hope Hodgson, Of One Blood by Pauline Hopkins, The Parasite and Other Tales of Terror by Arthur Conan Doyle, The King in Yellow by Robert W. Chambers, Ghost Stories of an Antiquarian by M.R. James, Gothic Classics: The Castle of Otranto and The Old English Baron by Horace Walpole and Clara Reeve, and The Mummy! by Jane Webb.

== Awards ==
=== Bram Stoker Awards ===
| Award | Category | Year | Nominated work | Result | Ref |
|---|---|---|---|---|---|
| Bram Stoker Awards | Anthology | 2013 | Dark Tales of Lost Civilizations | Nominated | |
| Bram Stoker Awards | Anthology | 2014 | After Death... | Won | |
| Bram Stoker Awards | Anthology | 2019 | A World of Horror | Nominated | |
| Bram Stoker Awards | Anthology | 2020 | Pop the Clutch | Nominated | |
| Bram Stoker Awards | Anthology | 2022 | Professor Charlatan Bardot's Travel Anthology... | Nominated | |
| Bram Stoker Awards | Collection | 2019 | That Which Grows Wild | Won | |
| Bram Stoker Awards | First Novel | 2020 | Doorways to the Deadeye | Nominated | |
| Bram Stoker Awards | Long Fiction | 2015 | "Dreams of a Little Suicide" | Nominated | |

=== Other honors ===
| Year | Nominated work | Award | Result | Ref |
|---|---|---|---|---|
| 2011 | "Solicitors Will Be Deleted" | Seventh International Short Story Contest | Special Commendation | |
| 2011 | "Thoughts of a Fish" | A Very Short Story Contest, February | Won | |
| 2013 | "Baggage of Eternal Night" | International Thriller Writers Awards Award for Best Short Story | Finalist | |
| 2014 | Soulmate | Writers of the Future Contest | Honorable Mention | |
| 2015 | "O Shades, My Woe" | Pushcart Prize for Best Short Story | Finalist | |
| 2022 | Professor Charlatan Bardot's Travel Anthology to the Most (Fictional) Haunted Buildings in the Weird, Wild World (2021 Edition) | Shirley Jackson Award for Best Anthology | Won | |
| 2022 | Professor Charlatan Bardot's Travel Anthology to the Most (Fictional) Haunted Buildings in the Weird, Wild World (2021 Edition) | World Fantasy Award for Best Anthology | Finalist | |

== Selected bibliography ==
=== Author ===
==== Novels and novellas ====
- Doorways to the Deadeye (2019, JournalStone) (novel) – ISBN 978-1947654976
- Baggage of Eternal Night (2013, JournalStone) (novella) – ISBN 978-1940161013

==== Collections ====
- That Which Grows Wild: 16 Tales of Dark Fiction (2018, Cemetery Dance) – ISBN 978-1949491005
  - “A Case Study in Natural Selection and How It Applies to Love”
  - "Last Days of the Gunslinger, John Amos"
  - "Momma"
  - "Footprints Fading in the Desert"
  - "The House of the Rising Sun, Forever"
  - “The Inveterate Establishment of Daddano & Co."
  - "Last Night..."
  - "Those Who Watch From On High"
  - "Vancouver Fog"
  - "A Curse and a Kiss"
  - "Whispers of the Earth"
  - "A Serving of Nomu Sashimi"
  - "Certain Sights of an Afflicted Woman"
  - "A Journey of Great Waves"
  - "A Quaint Ol’ Bigfoot Tale"
  - “Dreams of a Little Suicide"

=== Anthologies edited ===
All anthologies below are published under Dark Moon Books unless otherwise noted.

==== Exploring Dark Short Fiction ====
- Exploring Dark Short Fiction #1: A Primer to Steve Rasnic Tem (2017)
- Exploring Dark Short Fiction #2: A Primer to Kaaron Warren (2018)
- Exploring Dark Short Fiction #3: A Primer to Nisi Shawl (2018)
- Exploring Dark Short Fiction #4: A Primer to Jeffrey Ford (2019)
- Exploring Dark Short Fiction #5: A Primer to Han Song (2020)
- Exploring Dark Short Fiction #6: A Primer to Ramsey Campbell (2021)
- Exploring Dark Short Fiction #7: A Primer to Gemma Files (2025)

==== Horror Library ====
- Horror Library Volume 6 (2017, Cutting Block Books) (republished 2021 under Dark Moon Books)
- Horror Library Volume 7 (2022)
- Horror Library Volume 8 (2023)

==== Standalone ====
- Dark Tales of Lost Civilizations (2012)
- After Death… (2013)
- The Five Senses of Horror (2018)
- A World of Horror (2018)
- Pop the Clutch: Thrilling Tales of Rockabilly, Monsters, and Hot Rod Horror (2019)
- Professor Charlatan Bardot's Travel Anthology to the Most (Fictional) Haunted Buildings in the Weird, Wild World (2021)

== See also ==
- List of horror fiction authors
