= Christopher Fox (composer) =

English composer (born 1955)

Christopher Fox (born 10 March 1955) is an English composer and writer on music.

== Biography ==
He studied at the universities of Liverpool, Southampton and York, where his teachers included Hugh Wood and Jonathan Harvey. He received a PhD in composition from the University of York in 1984. From 1984 to 1994 he was a member of the composition staff at the Darmstadt New Music Summer School. He is currently Professor in Music at Brunel University, a post he took up in 2006. His music is widely performed, broadcast and recorded. He is also a prolific writer on music. In addition to concert works, Fox has collaborated with artists on gallery works, and with the poet Ian Duhig on a "musical box".

An important aspect of Fox's music is its stylistic breadth—whilst his principal considerations may seem to be with systems music and adopting a systematic approach, his music also serves a political function, is deeply rooted in the post-war Darmstadt traditions of applying psychological and intellectual models to the structure and content of music and at the same time exists in a world of diverse musical attitudes, including references to the popular arts, to historical music and to cross-cultural music. The stylistic range of his works is very aurally apparent and includes complex microtonal chamber works, large-scale modernist ensemble pieces, tape cut-up collages and minimalistic pieces for guitars and saxophones.

His writings on music have also been published widely, in the journals Contact (of which he was an editor), Contemporary Music Review, Musical Times and Tempo, and deal principally with new music, in particular experimental, minimalist and complex tendencies in American and European music. He was co-editor of Von Kranichstein zur Gegenwart (1996, DACO Verlag, Stuttgart), a history of 50 years of the Darmstadt Ferienkurse, and of Uncommon Ground: The Music of Michael Finnissy (1998, Ashgate Press, Aldershot).

== Recordings ==
- Inner: Straight Lines in Broken Times? / chant suspendu / Generic Compositions #3, #4, & #5 / Inner; performed by Anton Lukosevieze (cello); Metier Records (2001)
