= Richard Thomas (author) =

American author (born 1967)

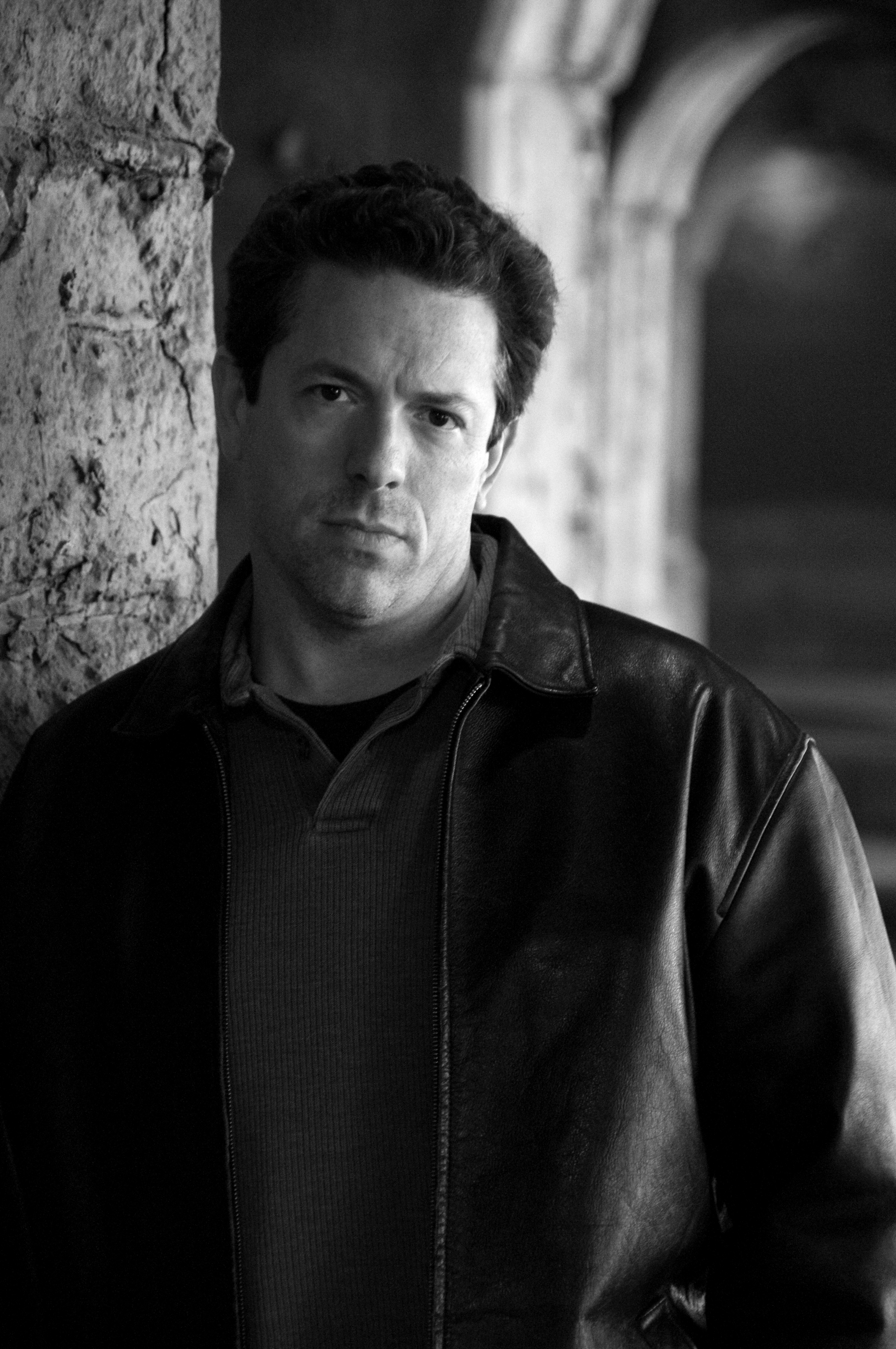
- Richard Thomas in Wicker Park, Illinois in 2010
- Born: November 21, 1967 (age 58); St. Louis, Missouri, United States
- Education: Bradley University (BS); Murray State University (MFA)
- Occupations: Novelist; short story writer; editor; teacher; publisher
- Writing career
- Genres: Neo-noir, horror, fantasy, science fiction, new-weird
- Notable works: Breaker (Thriller Award finalist), Spontaneous Human Combustion (Bram Stoker Award finalist), and Exigencies (Shirley Jackson Award finalist) as editor.
- Website: www.whatdoesnotkillme.com

Richard Thomas (born November 21, 1967) is an American author. His focus is on neo-noir, new weird, and speculative fiction, typically including elements of violence, mental instability, breaks in reality, unreliable narrators, the uncanny, and tragedy. His work is rich in setting and sensory details—often called maximalism. His writing has also been called transgressive and grotesque. In recent years, his dark fiction has added more hope, leaning into hopepunk. He was Editor-in-Chief at both Dark House Press (2012-2016) and Gamut Magazine (2017-2019 and 2023-2024).

== Biography ==
Thomas was born in St. Louis, Missouri, and grew up in Webster Groves. He earned a Bachelor of Science at Bradley University, in Peoria, Illinois, and in 2012 an MFA at Murray State University. He currently lives in Chicago.

Thomas was Editor-in-Chief at Dark House Press , an imprint of Curbside Splendor Publishing that launched in 2014 with The New Black. Work there was nominated for both the Bram Stoker Award and the Shirley Jackson Award. He was also the Editor of Gamut Magazine, a new online publication focusing on neo-noir, speculative fiction with a literary bent, that was funded by a successful Kickstarter, raising over $55,000. It was launched on January 1, 2017, shuttered in 2018, and relaunched as the House of Gamut on January 1, 2024.

In addition to his fiction he wrote a Storyville column at LitReactor.com for ten years before it shut down. He has taught creative writing at the Iowa Summer Writing Festival , Story Studio Chicago , LitReactor.com , and his own classes (online) . As of 2026 he also teaches at Writer's Digest University and is a writing coach at the Gilliam Writers Group .

== Bibliography ==
=== Novels ===
- Transubstantiate (Otherworld Publications) April, 2010
- Disintegration (Random House Alibi) May, 2015
- Breaker (Random House Alibi) January, 2016
- Incarnate (Podium Audio), September, 2024

=== Collections ===
- Herniated Roots: Stories (Snubnose Press) September, 2012
- Staring Into the Abyss (Kraken Press) April, 2013
- Tribulations: Stories (Crystal Lake Publishing / Cemetery Dance) April, 2016
- Spontaneous Human Combustion (Turner Publishing), February, 2022

== Nominations, awards and contests ==
- Winner, "Enter the World of Filaria" contest, 2009, at ChiZine for "Maker of Flight."
- Winner of the 2011 Cafe Doom / One Buck Horror short story contest for "Wicker Park Pause."
- “Terrapin Station,” Pear Noir #5, January 2011 (Pushcart nomination)
- “Fireflies,” Polluto #8, May 2012 (Honorable mention, Best Horror of the Year)
- “The Jenny Store,” Qualia Nous, Written Backwards, October 2014 (Bram Stoker-nominated anthology)
- "White Picket Fences," Shadows over Main Street, Hazardous Press, January 2015 (Honorable mention, Best Horror of the Year)
- "From Within," Slave Stories: Scenes from the Slave State, Omnium Gatherum, April 2015 (Honorable mention, Best Horror of the Year)
- Bram Stoker Award. 2014: nominated for Best Anthology—Burnt Tongues, Medallion Press (Co-Editor) and Qualia Nous, Written Backwards ("Jenny Store"); nominated for Best Short Story Collection: After the People Lights Have Gone Off by Stephen Graham Jones, Dark House Press (Publisher); nominated for Non-Fiction: Horror 101: The Way Forward, Crystal Lake Publishing ("The Journey: Rudy Jenkins Buries His Fears").| 2016: nominated for Best Anthology—Chiral Mad 3 edited by Michael Bailey ("The Offering on the Hill") AND Gutted: Beautiful Horror Stories edited by Doug Murano and D. Alexander Ward ("Repent") | 2017: Winner for Best Anthology—Behold!: Oddities, Curiosities and Undefinable Wonders, edited by Doug Murano ("Hireath"; nominated for Non-Fiction for Where Nightmares Come From: The Art of Storytelling in the Horror Genre edited by Joe Mynhardt and Eugene Johnson; 2022: nominated for Best Fiction Collection—Spontaneous Human Combustion, Turner Publishing (Keylight);
- Shirley Jackson Award. 2014: nominated for Best Short Story Collection—After the People Lights Have Gone Off by Stephen Graham Jones, Dark House Press (Publisher) | 2015: nominated for Best Anthology—Exigencies, edited by Richard Thomas; nominated for Best Short Fiction: "Wilderness" by Letitia Trent, in Exigencies (Editor and Publisher)
- This is Horror Award. 2014: Winner for Best Anthology: Burnt Tongues, Medallion Press (Co-Editor); Winner for Best Short Story Collection: After the People Lights Have Gone Off by Stephen Graham Jones, Dark House Press (Publisher).| 2015: Nominee for Best Short Story Collection: Vile Men, by Rebecca Jones-Howe, Dark House Press (Publisher); Nominee for Best Anthology: Exigences, Dark House Press (Editor and Publisher); Nominee for Best Press, Dark House Press (Editor-in-Chief).| 2016: Nominee for Best Novel: Paper Tigers, by Damien Angelica Walters, Medallion Press (Publisher).| 2017: Nominee for Best Magazine: Gamut (Editor, Publisher, Editor-in-Chief).|
- Disintegration (Random House Alibi), 2015: Best Fiction Books of 2015 (Entropy Magazine); Top Ten Books of 2015 (Cultured Vultures); Favorite Reads of 2015 (Shotgun Logic). Best Fiction Reads of 2015 (Quiet Fury Books).
- Best Horror of the Year: Volume Eight, June, 2016: "Wilderness" by Letitia Trent, in Exigencies (Editor and Publisher).
- "Repent," Gutted: Beautiful Horror Stories, Crystal Lake Publishing and "The Offering on the Hill," Chiral Mad 3, Written Backwards, 2016 (Bram Stoker Winner, Best Anthology)
- International Thriller Writers Awards. 2016: Finalist for Best eBook Novel: Breaker (Penguin Random House Alibi)
- Million Writers Awards. 2016: Notable story, "From Within" (reprinted online at Cease, Cows).
- “The Offering on the Hill,” Chiral Mad 3, March 2016 (Honorable mention, Best Horror of the Year)
- “Repent,” Gutted: Beautiful Horror Stories, June 2016 (Honorable mention, Best Horror of the Year)
- Gamut magazine had eighteen stories and poems listed as Honorable Mentions for Best Horror of the Year) . (Editor and Editor-in-Chief)
- "Golden Sun," Chiral Mad 4 included in The Best Horror of the Year, Volume Eleven. Co-written with Kristi DeMeester, Damien Angelica Walters, and Michael Wehunt. 2019
- "Sunk," The Off-Season included in The Best Horror of the Year, Volume Seventeen. 2025
- Judge for the 2026 World Fantasy Awards
