= CD Publications =

American news service firm

- Type: Privately held
- Industry: Publishing
- Founded: 1961
- Founder: Ash Gerecht
- Headquarters: Silver Spring, Maryland, U.S.
- Key people: Mike Gerecht, Publisher; Jim Rogers, Associate Publisher & Editorial Director
- Products: Online News Services

CD Publications began as a news service firm located in Silver Spring, Maryland, outside Washington, D.C. It produces web-based news services and newsletters, whose topics of coverage include housing, health care, education, funding, aging and Native Americans.

== History ==
CD Publications was founded in 1961 by Ash Gerecht of Kansas City, Missouri, and his wife, Gloria. The company was originally headquartered in Silver Spring, Maryland.

The first newsletter published was Housing Affairs Letter. It was followed by Community Development Digest (1965), Housing Market Report (1976), Managing Housing Letter (1978), Housing the Elderly (1982) and CD Housing Register (1983).

In 1984, the company added senior affairs to its housing-related subjects with Aging News Alert. In 1986, coverage was expanded to include grant-seeking with Federal Assistance Monitor and business in 1987 with Minorities in Business Insider. New topics of coverage came in late 1998 when Youth Crime Alert and Workplace Discrimination Alert were founded.

In 2001, the company began a transition from print-only publications to Web-based online news services. This project was led by veteran newsletter executive Jim Rogers, formerly of Inside Washington Publishers and Phillips Business Information, who served as the company's Assistant Publisher and Editorial Director.

During the decade in which the transition project began, several publications were folded into other publications. For example, Minorities in Business Insider became part of Federal & Foundation Assistance Monitor, as did Youth Crime Alert and Workplace Discrimination Alert. Healthcare Disparities Report became part of Community Health Funding Report, as did Disabilities Funding Report and Substance Abuse Funding News. Other CD Publications news products include: Aging News Alert, Children and Youth Funding Report, Private Grants Alert, Native American Report, and Community Development Digest.

In February 2011, the company's oldest publication, Housing Affairs Letter, celebrated its 50th anniversary.

In December 2013, the Gerecht family relinquished ownership of the company, selling it to Eli Global Research of Durham, North Carolina. Today, the company operates as CD Publications Group, a division of Eli Global. Rogers continues to serve as its managing editor.

=== Acquisitions ===
In late 1996, LRP Publications, in Horsham, Pennsylvania, sold Serving Elderly Clients, which CD Publications folded into the newly launched Senior Law Report. In late 1999, CD Pubs bought The Maturing Marketplace from Silver Spring-based Business Publishers, Inc., and folded it into Selling to Seniors, which at the time was edited by Allison Patterson. BPI then sold Federal Research Report in January 2001 (according to one report), which CD Pubs added to Federal Assistance Monitor. The company acquired Inside Housing from Housing Ink, also of Silver Spring, in mid-2001 and merged it into Housing Market Report, the report which also gained the readership of Construction News when that title was bought from Evans Publishing of Portland, Oregon, in December 2004.

In the second half of 2004, CD Publications acquired Health Grants & Contracts Weekly from LRP Publications of Palm Beach Gardens, Florida, and folded it into the twice-monthly Community Health Funding Report. In Fall 2006, the company acquired Native American Report and Native American Law Report from Eli Research and combined them into Native American Report. It also acquired Child Protection Report from the same group.

=== Sales, cancellations, internal mergers ===
In late 2006, Managing Housing Letter was merged with Landlord Law Report (est. 1998) to form Landlord Law & Multi-housing Report. Around the same time, Child Protection Report was folded into Children & Youth Funding Report, following an attempt to promote the former publication on its own.

In January 2007, Aid For Education Report, Disability Funding Report and Substance Abuse Funding News were converted to online-only publications in an attempt to lower costs and save them from cancellation. However, by mid year, DFN had been folded into SAF to create Substance Abuse & Disability Services Report, and AFE was folded into Federal Assistance Monitor (higher ed) and Children and Youth Funding Report (K-12). As part of the same deal in which the company acquired NAR and CPR, CD Publications sold Homeland Security Funding Report to Eli.

In September 2010, however, the company reprised its coverage of security-related issues with the creation of Public Safety Funding Report. One year later, that publication was folded into Community Development Digest.

== Publications (current) ==
=== Children & Youth Funding Report ===
Children & Youth Funding Report reports on public and private sources of funding for programs focused on high-risk, low income and underserved youth and children. CYF posts announcements of federal, foundation and private grants for child welfare, juvenile justice, education, health care and other related areas. It covers legislation, government policy, local programs, proposal-writing, and federal departments/agencies related to child services.

=== Community Health Funding Report ===
- Community Health Funding Report reports on sources of funding for healthcare concerns, such as substance abuse, teen pregnancy, minority healthcare, maternal/child health, chronic illness, mental health and HIV/AIDS programs. It also covers activities of Congress and federal agencies. CHF posts grant announcements, interviews, advice columns, case studies and budget updates. It also reports on healthcare reform and model programs.

=== Federal & Foundation Assistance Monitor ===
- Federal & Foundation Assistance Monitor reports on public and private sources of funding for community programs, including education, youth services and health care. It also covers activities of Congress and federal agencies. FAM posts federal funding announcements, private grants, legislative actions toward community programs, policy news and proposal-writing tips. It also covers fundraising workshops sponsored by the Foundation Center, the Support Center and other agencies.

=== Native American Report ===
- Native American Report reports on activities of Congress, the courts and federal agencies related to tribal interests. NAR publishes news articles on tribal issues related to health access, health promotion and disease management. It also provides updates on, among other things, education improvement and employment/job training programs. Other topics include the Bureau of Indian Affairs, taxation, regulations, Native American law, sovereignty and gaming disputes.

=== Private Grants Alert ===
- Private Grants Alert, which is taglined "your monthly round-up of the latest funding from foundations, corporations and individuals," publishes notices of funding for social service programs. PGA compiles and publishes a list of roughly 70 new private and corporate grant notices per month. It includes funder contact information and advice columns.

=== Community Development Digest ===
- Community Development Digest is one of the oldest professional community development periodicals still being produced. Also known as CD Digest or CDD, "the national newsletter on community and economic development" reports on the Community Development Block Grant program (CDBG) [1] and covers congressional legislation, agency regulations, court decisions and funding.

CDD's coverage of community development projects has included transit, as in February 1999 reports on federal light-rail systems to be funded under the 1998 Transportation Equity Act for the 21st Century. There's also a consistent emphasis on restoration efforts, of both historical and utilitarian structures.

In early 2008, CDD invested news space on lobbying efforts of the National Alliance of Community Economic Development Associations (NACEDA) for legislation to prevent home foreclosures, as well as attacks on the Bush Administration's proposed FY09 budget cuts to CDBG. Over the years, CDD has been sourced, referenced or mentioned in numerous books and reports. These include From Nation to States: The Small Cities Community Development Block Grant Program (1986), Understanding Local Economic Development (1999), Urban Planning in a Multicultural Society (2000) and Asset Building and Community Development (2001). CDD finds its way into local government meetings, either as a reference source or just through the endorsement of a meeting attendee. Among those who have posted their meeting minutes, with mention of CDD, online are the Allegany County (NY) Planning Board (September 15, 2004) and the Warren County (NY) Board Of Supervisors (October 13, 2006). Currently, CDD posts updates on such issues as community planning, infrastructure financing, enterprise zones, downtown and rural development, housing rehabilitation and preservation, and neighborhood revitalization. It also provides a "roundup" of state and local development efforts in urban and rural communities.

=== Housing Affairs Letter ===
Housing Affairs Letter is a news service (or newsletter) produced in Silver Spring, Maryland by CD Publications that covers the public, private and subsidized housing industries. It is one of the oldest continuing publications of its kind.

Housing Affairs Letter was the first newsletter produced by CD Publications upon its founding in 1961. It began publication four years before the creation of the U.S. Department of Housing and Urban Development, and a significant percentage of its coverage since then has focused on HUD.

Over the years, HAL articles have been reprinted, referenced, quoted or mentioned in numerous periodicals and journals, including The Washington Post, the National Review, The Journal of Housing, and the Journal of Urban Law.

HAL has been mentioned in or used as a reference for many books, including:

- Problems in Political Economy: An Urban Perspective
- Where to Find Business Information: A Worldwide Guide for Everyone who Needs the Answers to Business Questions
- Leading Issues in Black Political Economy
- A Right to Housing: Foundation for a New Social Agenda
- The Encyclopedia of Housing
- The Review of Black Political Economy
- Housing Urban America
- Housing: Federal Policies and Programs
- Journalism That Matters: How Business-to-Business Editors Change the Industries They Cover
- A Different Vision
- HUD Scandals: Howling Headlines and Silent Fiascoes

Additionally, HAL has appeared in Congressional reports, in documents of city planning and development committees, and in multiple publications of such housing organizations as the Fannie Mae Foundation. In 2007, HAL appeared as "suggested additional reading" on Dr. Sammis B. White's syllabus for a class entitled "Housing Markets and Public Policy." It was mentioned alongside such respected national publications as Fortune, Forbes and the Wall Street Journal.

HAL currently reports on the full housing industry, with emphases on HUD, Fannie Mae, Federal Reserve Board activities, Congressional legislation and Fair Housing.

=== Aging News Alert ===
Also known as "The Senior Services & Funding Report," Aging News Alert reports on senior programs, new funding and federal actions affecting the elderly. Its coverage includes the Older Americans Act, long-term care, Social Security and Medicare, transportation, health and nutrition, senior law and elder abuse. ANA covers congressional legislation and agency regulation. It also contains interviews with government officials and association representatives, and posts notices of aging-related grants.

== Notes ==
- "CD Publications acquires Weekly from LRP" (2004-09-07). Newsletter on Newsletters, The.
- "CD Publications.(Acquisitions)" (March 2007). Newsletter on Newsletters, The.
- "CD Publications launches two newsletters focusing on two growing problems in American society." (March 2004). Newsletter on Newsletters, The.
- "CD PUBLICATIONS' "LANDLORD LAW REPORT" NEWSLETTER." (1998-03-31).
- "Federal Research Report." (2001-01-31). COPYRIGHT 2001 JK Publishing, Inc.
- "CD PUBLICATIONS BUYS 'SERVING ELDERLY CLIENTS'; STARTS 'SENIOR LAW REPORT'" (1996-11-30). COPYRIGHT 1996 JK Publishing.
- "Homeland security subject of new title from CD Publications." (2002-12-31). Newsletter on Newsletters, The. COPYRIGHT 2002 Newsletter Clearinghouse. Found online at "Encyclopedia.com
- Malinowsky, H. Robert. "AIDS/STD News Report: Legislation, Funding, Grant Tips, R&D, News, December 9, 1998." (April 1999). AIDS BOOK REVIEW JOURNAL, University of Illinois at Chicago. Found online at "UIC.edu
- Morris, Andrew J. and Martin Degollo. "Information on Government People--Government documents relating to people". (2007-2008). Found online at "Govpeople.org https://web.archive.org/web/20081204204510/http://www.govpeople.org/Other_People/_PERIODICAL_PRESS_GALLERIES.htm
- "Acquisitions for NAIC Bibliographic Database and Reading Room Collections" (November 1998). National Aging Information Center. Found online at "Administration on Aging (https://web.archive.org/web/20061002234058/http://www.aoa.gov/naic/acqNov-98.html)".
- "Publications". A Grantseeker's Resource Guide To Obtaining Federal, Corporate and Foundation Grants. Federal Funding Resources. Found online at "www.tea.state.tx.us (http://www.tea.state.tx.us/opge/grantdev/seekers/document4.html)".
- "Brief, To-the-Point Messages Attract Prospective Donors" (2000-06-05). Substance Abuse Funding News. (c) CD Publications (March 31, 2000). Found online in A Fund Raiser's Newsyletter - June 2000 at "www.jointogether.org (http://www.jointogether.org/news/funding/trends/a-fundraisers-newsyletter-6-5-2000.html)".
- "Cultivating Future Supporters Raises Cash and Creates Pool of Volunteers" (Summer 1998). Fundraising Ideas That Work!. (c) CD Publications (April 1998). Found online in A FUND RAISER'S NEWSLETTER FROM JOYAUX ASSOCIATES at "www.lib.msu.edu (https://web.archive.org/web/20080907054738/http://www.lib.msu.edu/harris23/grants/news98su.htm)".
- "Acquisitions." (2001-07-15). Newsletter on Newsletters, The. Found online at "Allbusiness.com (http://www.allbusiness.com/marketing/direct-marketing-direct-mail/800493-1.html)".
- "Acquisition." (2005-01-17). Newsletter on Newsletters, The. Found online at "Allbusiness.com (http://www.allbusiness.com/marketing/direct-marketing-direct-mail/317824-1.html)".
- "Homeland security subject of new title from CD Publications." (2002-12-31). Newsletter on Newsletters, The. Found online at "Allbusiness.com (http://www.allbusiness.com/marketing/direct-marketing-direct-mail/396948-1.html)".
- "Acquisition." (1999-11-30). Newsletter on Newsletters, The. Found online at "Allbusiness.com (http://www.allbusiness.com/marketing/direct-marketing-direct-mail/355189-1.html)".
