= Jeff Gelb =

American writer and editor

- Occupations: Writer, editor
- Writing career
- Genres: Horror fiction, Fantasy
- Notable works: Dark Delicacies: Original Tales of Terror and the Macabre (2005)

Jeff Gelb is an American writer and editor. He won the 2005 Bram Stoker Award for Best Anthology with Del Howison for the book Dark Delicacies: Original Tales of Terror and the Macabre.

== Awards and nominations ==
In 2005, Gelb and co-editor Del Howison published Dark Delicacies: Original Tales of Terror and the Macabre (Carroll and Graf), which included stories by Ray Bradbury, Clive Barker, F. Paul Wilson, Chelsea Quinn Yarbro, David J. Schow, Steve Niles, Roberta Lannes, Gahan Wilson, and more. The book went on to win the 2005 Bram Stoker Award for Best Anthology.

In 2007, Gelb and co-editor Del Howison published Dark Delicacies II: Fear (Carroll and Graf). This book was nominated for a Bram Stoker Award and a Shirley Jackson Award for Best Anthology.

== See also ==
- List of horror fiction authors
