= Comma Press =

UK publishing house

- Founded: 2002
- Founder: Ra Page Sarah Eyre
- Country of origin: United Kingdom
- Headquarters location: Manchester
- Distribution: NBN International (UK); Independent Publishers Group (US)
- Publication types: Books
- Official website: commapress.co.uk

Comma Press is a publishing house based in Manchester, United Kingdom, that publishes short story anthologies and single-author collections in paperback and eBook formats.

== History ==
Comma Press was founded in 2002 by Sarah Eyre and Ra Page, a former editor at Manchester's City Life magazine. Comma Press is one of Arts Council England's National Portfolio Organisations for the funding period from 2018 to 2022.

Comma is a founding member and coordinator of The Northern Fiction Alliance, a cohort assembled to showcase the output of northern independent presses.

== Publications ==
Comma Press publishes anthologies of short stories, including the BBC National Short Story Award Anthology.

Comma Press publishes horror fiction as part of its Comma Modern Horror series. The New Uncanny: Tales of Unease (2008), edited by Sarah Eyre and Ra Page, asked fourteen writers to respond to Sigmund Freud's essay "The Uncanny". Matthew Holness's story from the collection, "Possum", was adapted into the 2018 film Possum. A follow-up anthology, The New Abject: Tales of Modern Unease, also edited by Eyre and Page, invited writers to respond to theories of the abject. The series also includes Phobic: Modern Horror Stories, edited by Andy Murray.

Comma runs the Dinesh Allirajah Prize for Short Fiction in collaboration with the University of Central Lancashire.

== Awards ==
In June 2017 Comma was awarded the inaugural "Northern Publisher of the Year" award at the Northern Soul Awards in Manchester.

The New Uncanny: Tales of Unease (2008) won the 2008 Shirley Jackson Award for Best Anthology.
