= Roberta Lannes =

American writer

Roberta Lannes (born December 1948) is an American writer of literary, mystery and horror fiction as well as articles, essays, reviews and poetry.

Lannes was born in Los Angeles, California where her father did financial management for small production companies formed by actors in the entertainment industry. Her early horror fiction often explored family relationships and abuse, and its frequently graphic nature led to Lannes's early involvement in the Splatterpunk movement. Her story "Goodbye Dark Love" is considered a classic in the genre, and her work also paved the way for later female writers of horror fiction. Her later work tends toward the mysterious and the psychological.

Lannes has published more than fifty short stories, often in anthologies edited by British editor Stephen Jones. Her stories have been reprinted in both Year's Best Horror and Fantasy, edited by Ellen Datlow, and Best New Horror, edited by Jones. An up-to-date listing can be found on her official website (see below). South African filmmaker Ian Kerkhof used Lannes's work (as well as that of J.G. Ballard, Henry Rollins, and Charles Manson) in his 1994 movie Ten Monologues From the Lives of Serial Killers.

In 1995, Silver Salamander Press released her first collection, The Mirror of Night. She has also contributed non-fiction essays to such books as Another 100 Best Horror Novels, edited by Stephen Jones and Kim Newman, and she appeared in the 1996 Horror Writers Calendar.

She is also an accomplished digital artist and photographer who has exhibited in galleries and designed iPhone App splash screens, CD covers for independent and alternative record labels, calendars and greeting cards. Her photography has been published in various magazines, most lately Issue 22 of "JPG Magazine".

Roberta taught secondary school journalism, English, photography, fine and digital art in the William S. Hart Union High School District from 1972 to 2009. Now retired, she is at work on numerous writing projects, graphic design and illustration.

She currently resides in Southern California with her British husband Mark Sealey, a journalist, poet, music critic, and retired senior software engineer for the Getty Museum.

== See also ==
- List of horror fiction authors
