= Bram Stoker Award for Best First Novel =

Award from Horror Writers Association

The Bram Stoker Award for First Novel is an award presented by the Horror Writers Association (HWA) for "superior achievement" in horror writing for an author's first horror novel.

== Winners and nominees ==
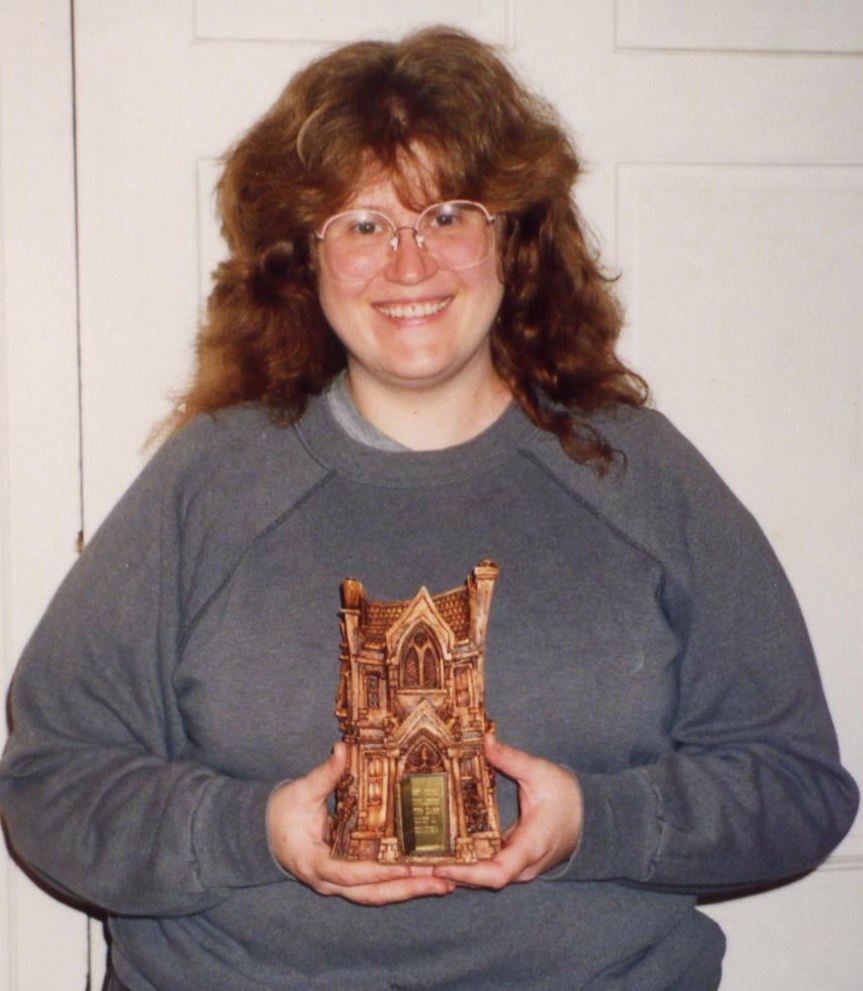
Nancy A. Collins with her 1989 Bram Stoker Award

Bram Stoker Award for Best First Novel
Year	Recipient	Title	Citation	Ref.
1987	Lisa Cantrell	The Manse	Winner	
1987	Clive Barker	The Damnation Game	Nominee	
1987	Rex Miller	Slob	Nominee	
1987	Tony Richards	The Harvest Bride	Nominee	
1987	Steve Rasnic Tem	Excavation	Nominee	
1988	Kelley Wilde	The Suiting	Winner	
1988	Michael Paine	Cities of the Dead	Nominee	
1988	Kevin J. Anderson	Resurrection, Inc.	Nominee	
1988	Allen Lee Harris	Deliver Us From Evil	Nominee	
1988	J. Michael Straczynski	Demon Night	Nominee	
1988	John L. Byrne	Fear Book	Nominee	
1989	Nancy A. Collins	Sunglasses After Dark	Winner	
1989	Tom Elliott (JW Paine)	The Dwelling	Nominee	
1989	Douglas Clegg	Goat Dance	Nominee	
1989	Dean Wesley Smith	Laying The Music To Rest	Nominee	
1989	Jean Paiva	The Lilith Factor	Nominee	
1990	Bentley Little	The Revelation	Winner	
1990	Alan Rodgers	Blood of the Children	Nominee	
1990	Tom Piccirilli	Dark Father	Nominee	
1990	T. Chris Martindale	Nightblood	Nominee	
1991	Kathe Koja	The Cipher	Winner	
1991	Melanie Tem	Prodigal	Winner	
1991	Chris Curry & L. Dean James	Winter Scream	Nominee	
1991	Dennis Danvers	Wilderness	Nominee	
1991	Ashley McConnell	Unearthed	Nominee	
1992	Elizabeth Massie	Sineater	Winner	
1992	Poppy Z. Brite	Lost Souls	Nominee	
1992	Brian D'Amato	Beauty	Nominee	
1992	Gary Raisor	Less Than Human	Nominee	
1992	Wayne Allen Salee	The Holy Terror	Nominee	
1993	Nina Kiriki Hoffman	The Thread that Binds the Bones	Winner	
1993	Yvonne Navarro	Afterage	Nominee	
1993	Richard Christian Matheson	Created By	Nominee	
1993	Anne Billson	Suckers	Nominee	
1993	Philip Nutman	Wet Work	Nominee	
1994	Michael Arnzen	Grave Markings	Winner	
1994	Jay R. Bonansinga	The Black Mariah	Nominee	
1994	Robert Devereaux	Deadweight	Nominee	
1994	Nancy Kilpatrick	Near Death	Nominee	
1995	Lucy Taylor	The Safety of Unknown Cities	Winner	
1995	Gary Bowen	Diary of a Vampire	Nominee	
1995	Tananarive Due	The Between	Nominee	
1995	Robert Girardi	Madeleine's Ghost	Nominee	
1995	Edo van Belkom	Wyrm Wolf	Nominee	
1996	Owl Goingback	Crota	Winner	
1996	Donald R. Burleson	Flute Song	Nominee	
1996	Greg Kihn	Horror Show	Nominee	
1996	Del Stone	Dead Heat	Nominee	
1997	Kirsten Bakis	Lives of the Monster Dogs	Winner	
1997	Stephen Dedman	The Art of Arrow Cutting	Nominee	
1997	Barry Hoffman	Hungry Eyes	Nominee	
1997	Mary Ann Mitchell	Drawn to the Grave	Nominee	
1997	Mary Murrey	The Inquisitor	Nominee	
1998	Michael Marano	Dawn Song	Winner	
1998	P.D. Cacek	Night Prayers	Nominee	
1998	Charlee Jacob	This Symbiotic Fascination	Nominee	
1998	Caitlin R. Kiernan	Silk	Nominee	
1999	J. G. Passarella	Wither	Winner	
1999	Steve Beai	Widow's Walk	Nominee	
1999	John Connolly	Every Dead Thing	Nominee	
1999	China Miéville	King Rat	Nominee	
2000	Brian A. Hopkins	The Licking Valley Coon Hunters Club	Winner	
2000	Simon Clark	Nailed by the Heart	Nominee	
2000	Mark Z. Danielewski	House of Leaves	Nominee	
2000	Douglas E. Winter	Run	Nominee	
2001	Michael Oliveri	Deadliest of the Species	Winner	
2001	Diana Barron	Phantom Feast	Nominee	
2001	d.g.k. goldberg	Skating on the Edge	Nominee	
2001	Joe Nassise	Riverwatch	Nominee	
2002	Alice Sebold	The Lovely Bones	Winner	
2002	Tina Jens	The Blues Ain't Nothing	Nominee	
2002	Michael Laimo	Atmosphere	Nominee	
2002	Scott Nicholson	The Red Church	Nominee	
2003	Brian Keene	The Rising	Winner	
2003	William D. Gagliani	Wolf's Trap	Nominee	
2003	Jeffrey Thomas	Monstrocity	Nominee	
2003	Jeff VanderMeer	Veniss Underground	Nominee	
2004	John Everson	Covenant	Winner	
2004	Lee Thomas	Stained	Winner	
2004	James Kidman	Black Fire	Nominee	
2004	Nick Mamatas	Move Under Ground	Nominee	
2005	Weston Ochse	Scarecrow Gods	Winner	
2005	Kealan Patrick Burke	The Hides	Nominee	
2005	Alan M. Clark and Jeremy Robert Johnson	Siren Promised	Nominee	
2006	Jonathan Maberry	Ghost Road Blues	Winner	
2006	Sarah Langan	The Keeper	Nominee	
2006	Nate Kenyon	Bloodstone	Nominee	
2006	Alexandra Sokoloff	The Harrowing	Nominee	
2007	Joe Hill	Heart-Shaped Box	Winner	
2007	Michael Louis Calvillo	I Will Rise	Nominee	
2007	John R. Little	The Memory Tree	Nominee	
2007	Mary SanGiovanni	The Hollower	Nominee	
2008	Lisa Mannetti	The Gentling Box	Winner	
2008	Christopher Conlon	Midnight on Mourn Street	Nominee	
2008	Michael McCarty and Mark McLaughlin	Monster Behind the Wheel	Nominee	
2008	David Oppegaard	The Suicide Collectors	Nominee	
2008	Joel A. Sutherland	Frozen Blood	Nominee	
2009	Hank Schwaeble	Damnable	Winner	
2009	S. G. Browne	Breathers	Nominee	
2009	Daniel G. Keohane	Solomon's Grave	Nominee	
2009	Paul Tremblay	The Little Sleep	Nominee	
2010	Benjamin Kane Ethridge	Black & Orange	Winner	
2010	Lisa Morton	The Castle of Los Angeles	Winner	
2010	Gemma Files	A Book of Tongues	Nominee	
2010	Lucy A. Snyder	Spellbent	Nominee	
2011	Allyson Bird	Isis Unbound	Winner	
2011	John Hornor Jacobs	Southern Gods	Nominee	
2011	Frazer Lee	The Lamplighters	Nominee	
2011	Thomas Roche	The Panama Laugh	Nominee	
2011	Brett J. Talley	That Which Should Not Be	Nominee	
2012	L. L. Soares	Life Rage	Winner	
2012	Michael Boccacino	Charlotte Markham and the House of Darkling	Nominee	
2012	Deborah Coates	Wide Open	Nominee	
2012	Charles Day	The Legend of the Pumpkin Thief	Nominee	
2012	Peter Dudar	A Requiem for Dead Flies	Nominee	
2012	Richard Gropp	Bad Glass	Nominee	
2013	Rena Mason	The Evolutionist	Winner	
2013	Kate Jonez	Candy House	Nominee	
2013	John Mantooth	The Year of the Storm	Nominee	
2013	Jonathan Moore	Redheads	Nominee	
2013	Royce Prouty	Stoker’s Manuscript	Nominee	
2014	Maria Alexander	Mr. Wicker	Winner	
2014	J. D. Barker	Forsaken	Nominee	
2014	David Cronenberg	Consumed	Nominee	
2014	Michael Knost	Return of the Mothman	Nominee	
2014	Josh Malerman	Bird Box	Nominee	
2015	Nicole Cushing	Mr. Suicide	Winner	
2015	Courtney Alameda	Shutter	Nominee	
2015	Brian Kirk	We Are Monsters	Nominee	
2015	John McIlveen	Hannahwhere	Nominee	
2015	John Claude Smith	Riding the Centipede	Nominee	
2016	Tom Deady	Haven	Winner	
2016	Barbara Barnett	The Apothecary’s Curse	Nominee	
2016	Greg Chapman	Hollow House	Nominee	
2016	Michelle Garza & Melissa Lason	Mayan Blue	Nominee	
2016	Stephanie M. Wytovich	The Eighth	Nominee	
2017	Robert Payne Cabeen	Cold Cuts	Winner	
2017	Andy Davidson	In The Valley of the Sun	Nominee	
2017	Matt Hayward	What Do Monsters Fear?	Nominee	
2017	Jeremy Hepler	The Boulevard Monster	Nominee	
2017	Scott Thomas	Kill Creek	Nominee	
2018	Gwendolyn Kiste	The Rust Maidens	Winner	
2018	Julia Fine	What Should Be Wild	Nominee	
2018	T.E. Grau	I Am the River	Nominee	
2018	Zoje Stage	Baby Teeth	Nominee	
2018	Tony Tremblay	The Moore House	Nominee	
2019	Sarah Read	The Bone Weaver's Orchard	Winner	
2019	Gemma Amor	Dear Laura	Nominee	
2019	Eric J. Guignard	Doorways to the Deadeye	Nominee	
2019	Michelle Renee Lane	Invisible Chains	Nominee	
2019	Caitlin Starling	The Luminous Dead	Nominee	
2020	EV Knight	The Fourth Whore	Winner	
2020	Polly Hall	The Taxidermist’s Lover	Nominee	
2020	Rachel Harrison	The Return	Nominee	
2020	Ross Jeffery	Tome	Nominee	
2020	Kate Reed Petty	True Story	Nominee	
2021	Hailey Piper	Queen of Teeth	Winner	
2021	Lisa Quigley	The Forest	Nominee	
2021	S. Alessandro Martinez	Helminth	Nominee	
2021	Terry Miles	Rabbits	Nominee	
2021	Nicole Willson	Tidepool	Nominee	
2021	LaTanya McQueen	When the Reckoning Comes	Nominee	
2022	Christi Nogle	Beulah	Winner	
2022	Erin Adams	Jackal	Nominee	
2022	Isabel Cañas	The Hacienda	Nominee	
2022	KC Jones	Black Tide	Nominee	
2022	Ally Wilkes	All the White Spaces	Nominee	
2023
2023	Christa Carmen	The Daughters of Block Island	Winner	
2023	Johnny Compton	The Spite House	Nominee	
2023	Eric LaRocca	Everything the Darkness Eats	Nominee	
2023	CJ Leede	Maeve Fly	Nominee	
2023	Sam Rebelein	Edenville	Nominee	
2024
2024	Monika Kim	The Eyes Are the Best Part	Winner	
2024	Donyae Coles	Midnight Rooms	Nominee	
2024	Jessica Drake-Thomas	Hollow Girls	Nominee	
2024	Jenny Kiefer	This Wretched Valley	Nominee	
2024	Lindy Ryan	Bless Your Heart	Nominee	
2025	Michael Wehunt	The October Film Haunt	Winner	
2025	Grace Daly	The Scald-Crow	Finalist	
2025	Karella Bitter	Moonflow	Finalist	
2025	Tanya Pell	Her Wicked Roots	Finalist	
2025	Hester Steel	The Faceless Thing We Adore	Finalist	
2025	Kathryn Tennison	Molting	Finalist	
2025	Viel Neena	Listen to Your Sister	Finalist	
