= Gary Raisor =

American horror author

- Writing career
- Genre: Horror

Gary Raisor is an American horror author best known for the novels Less Than Human, Graven Images, Sinister Purposes, and his extensive short fiction work. His novels garnered reviews. He was nominated for a Bram Stoker Award for Best First Novel for Less Than Human in 1992.

He also edited the anthology Obsessions with stories from Dean Koontz, Kevin J. Anderson, F. Paul Wilson, Dan Simmons, Joe R. Lansdale, and featured the story Lady Madonna by Nancy Holder, which won the Bram Stoker Award for Short Fiction in 1991.

Raisor has written numerous short stories, beginning in the 1980s in Night Cry Magazine and The Horror Show, working his way into a lot of "Best Of" anthologies. Today, Raisor concentrates primarily on screenplays and comics.

== Bibliography ==
=== Novels ===
- Less Than Human (1992)
- Graven Images (2000)
- Sinister Purposes (2005)

=== Anthologies ===
- Obsessions - Editor (1991)

=== Short fiction ===
- Occupational Hazard (1985)
- Making Friends (1985)
- The Old Black Hat (1986)
- The Accounting (1987)
- Identity Crisis (1987)
- Cheapskate (1988)
- The Night Caller (1989)
- Distant Thunder (1989)
- Empty Places (1989)
- The Laughing Man (1991)
- Stigmata (1991)
- Hell Train (1991)
- Sometimes, the Hands Remember (1993)
- The Right Thing (1994)
- If I Should Die Before I Wake (1998)
- Cleaning Compulsion (2002)
- Gran'mama (2002)
- Willpower (2003)
- Sacrifice (2009)

== Adaptations ==
His short story, The Night Caller was adapted as a short film in 2011 by Donna Thorland and Peter Podgursky.

His short story, Making Friends was adapted as a short film in 2010 by producer Greg Bartlett and director Marvin Suarez.

== See also ==
- List of horror fiction authors
