= Geoff LaTulippe =

American screenwriter and film director

- Born: Cleveland, Ohio, U.S.
- Occupation(s): Screenwriter, film director
- Years active: 2008 – present
- Notable work: Going the Distance (2010)

Geoff LaTulippe is an American screenwriter and film director best known as the writer of the 2010 film Going the Distance.

== Early life ==
LaTulippe was born in Cleveland, Ohio. His father's job as a casket salesman caused his family to move across the United States between numerous cities before they settled in Harrisburg, Pennsylvania. LaTulippe attended James Madison University in Virginia, where he studied film and writing.

== Career ==
Shortly after moving to Los Angeles, California, LaTulippe was hired as a script reader at New Line Cinema, a job he was offered by his friend who worked at the studio. After working there for two years, he tired of the job, saying that it "start[ed] to suck away [my] creativity". In July 2008, he sold a spec script titled Going the Distance to New Line Cinema, a story based on his friend David Neustadter's previous long-term relationship. The film was ultimately directed by Nanette Burstein and released in September 2010. After selling his first screenplay, he quit his job as a script reader and became a full-time writer.

It was announced in 2009 that LaTulippe would write a film adaptation of Breathers: A Zombie's Lament, a novel by S. G. Browne, although the film is yet to go into production. In 2011, he was approached by the talent agency William Morris Endeavor (WME) to create a humorous short film about their company. The result was Yom Kippur at WME, which starred J. B. Smoove. The short film's popularity snowballed and it caught the attention of Adam Goodman, the president of Paramount Film Group, who then contacted LaTulippe to offer him a job as a film director. In 2012 Paramount announced that LaTulippe would direct an as-yet unnamed film for the studio.
