= Dead of Night (disambiguation) =

Dead of Night is a 1945 British horror anthology film.

Dead of Night may also refer to:

== Film and TV ==
- Deathdream, aka Dead of Night, a 1974 Canadian horror film
- Dead of Night (TV series), a 1972 British TV series
- Dead of Night: A Darkness at Blaisedon (unsold 1969 TV pilot produced by Dan Curtis)
- Dead of Night (1977 film), a television anthology film directed by Dan Curtis and written by Richard Matheson
- Lighthouse (1999 film), a British horror film (released in the U.S. as Dead of Night)
- "Dead of Night" (Torchwood), a 2011 episode of the TV series Torchwood: Miracle Day
- Dylan Dog: Dead of Night, a 2011 US film
- Dead of Night, a 2019 Snapchat original programme

== Books and comics ==
- Dead of Night (zombie novels), a series of zombie apocalypse novels by Jonathan Maberry
- Dead of Night (Fighting Fantasy), a Fighting Fantasy gamebook
- Dead of Night (comics), a number of comic series from Marvel MAX
- The Dead of Night (novel), a novel in the Tomorrow series by John Marsden
- The Dead of Night, a book in the Cahills vs. Vespers series by Peter Lerangis
- Dead of Night, the eighth book in the Survivors novel series by Erin Hunter
- Dead of Night, the 80th book in the Hardy Boys Casefiles series

== Other uses ==
- "The Dead of Night", a song by Depeche Mode from their 2001 album Exciter
- "Dead of the Night", a song by Bad Company from their 1990 album Holy Water
- "Dead of Night", a 1947 episode of the radio series Escape adapted from a segment of the 1945 film
- "The Dead of the Night", a 1944 episode of the radio series Suspense
- At Dead of Night, a 2020 video game developed by Tim Follin
