= Pine Deep Trilogy =

Series of novels by Jonathan Maberry

- Ghost Road Blues; Dead Man's Song; Bad Moon Rising
- Author: Jonathan Maberry
- Country: United States
- Language: English
- Genre: Horror
- Publisher: Pinnacle Books
- Published: 2006 - 2008
- Media type: Print (Paperback)

The Pine Deep Trilogy is a series of supernatural horror novels by Jonathan Maberry. The series is set in Pine Deep, a fictional rural Pennsylvania town that becomes plagued by an evil force thought to have been killed thirty years prior. In the books the town is considered to be "the most haunted town in America" and has a booming supernatural tourism industry based around the town's history and Halloween. The trilogy is composed of Ghost Road Blues, Dead Man's Song, and Bad Moon Rising.

The first book in the series, Ghost Road Blues, won the Bram Stoker Award for Best First Novel in 2006 and was one of Complex magazine's "25 Best Horror Novels of the New Millennium".

Pine Deep also appears in a crossover short story of Jonathan Maberry's Joe Ledger series of books, Material Witness. In Material Witness, a stand-alone short story that takes place in the early days of Joe Ledger's service in the Department of Military Sciences (a top secret division of Homeland Security), Joe Ledger and the DMS must protect a Pine Deep resident spook and author who is in over his head with the wrong people and may know more than he is letting on and in Pine Deep, nothing is what it seems.

== Premise ==
Thirty years ago, Oren "Bone Man" Morse was murdered by several townspeople that believed that he was responsible for a series of brutal and gruesome murders in the town of Pine Deep. Before he was killed, Morse tried to explain that the killer was actually local townsperson Ubel Griswold. Morse had fought and killed Griswold, who had been committing the murders while in his werewolf form, but was unable to convince the townspeople of his innocence. Years later Griswold reawakens and with the help of local mechanic Vic Wingate and the psychopathic Ruger, plans to be reborn and exact unimaginable terror on the town. However just as Griswold has awakened, so has the Bone Man, the man who originally stopped Griswold's initial reign of terror on the town.

The series follows Malcolm Crow, owner of a local Halloween-themed craft store and a survivor of the original massacre. As a boy of nine, Crow was saved by the Bone Man who prevented Griswold from killing him. His fiancé, Val Guthrie, is also a survivor, though it was her family that suffered at Griswold’s hands. Their friend and the mayor of Pine Deep, Terry Wolfe, has been suffering a terrible psychological breakdown that has roots in a moment of childhood trauma where his sister was murdered by Griswold and he was nearly killed.

=== Ghost Road Blues ===
In Ghost Road Blues Crow and his friend Terry have begun having nightmares, with Terry having ones that show him either committing atrocities or watching his city burn. Meanwhile, Crow has been planning to propose to his girlfriend Val, only for her and her family to be brutally attacked by Karl Ruger. The event leaves Val's father dead, her sister-in-law mentally scarred, and both herself and Crow heavily wounded.

At the same time, the local newsboy Mike Sweeney has his own problems. His step-father Vic Wingate is physically and emotionally abusing him under the influence of Ubel Griswold and another town local wants Mike dead, believing that the voice in his head is God telling him that Mike is the Antichrist.

=== Dead Man’s Song ===
In Dead Man’s Song, Crow and local newsman Willard Fowler Newton, begin tracking the backstory of the events of thirty years ago, while at the same time Vic Wingate and Karl Ruger quietly begin building an army of the undead to prepare for Griswold’s return. They intend to launch the Red Wave, a massive attack scheduled for Halloween Night. While Crow and Newton are down in Dark Hollow, a remote spot where Griswold both lived and died, one of Ruger’s companions, Boyd, has become a strange kind of mindless vampire. While Griswold’s ghost sets a trap for Crow, Wingate sends Boyd after Val Guthrie. The attack ends with the death of Val's brother and the near death of his wife, but Val manages to survive and kill Boyd via a headshot. During this, Crow and Newton investigate Griswold's seemingly abandoned house in Dark Hollow, only to almost die after the porch collapses in on them and a swarm of cockroaches attempts to attack them. They just barely manage to survive, making it back to Val just as she manages to kill Boyd.

At the same time, Terry is spiraling deeper and deeper into depression and insanity due to the images he sees when he manages to sleep as well as the waking visions of the sister Griswold murdered. Terry begins to lose control of himself, snapping at others and acting out of character. It's only after he almost kills his wife while he was beginning to succumb to the evil inside of him that Terry throws himself out of a window in a suicide attempt. Meanwhile, Mike is still being stalked by Tow Truck Eddie, having a few close calls and being saved multiple times by the intervention of the ghost of Owen Morse.

=== Bad Moon Rising ===
Bad Moon Rising picks up at the end of the events of the previous novel. Val is temporarily hospital-bound, Terry is in a coma, and Mike frequently falls into fugue states where he begins to change into a vampire, as it was revealed in the previous book that he is the son of Ubel Griswold while he possessed a man later revealed to be Terry. Mike continues to be stalked by Tow Truck Eddie as Val, Newton, and Crow attempt to reach out to a Pennsylvania researcher that specializes in the occult, Jonatha.

Meanwhile, Vic Wingate continues to prepare for the upcoming "Red Wave" that will bring back Griswold on Halloween Night, only for Ruger to eventually end up killing his wife Lois and transforming her into a living vampire. She manages to avoid the temptation for human blood, which keeps her soul inside of her body. Lois manages to save her son Mike from being killed by Vic and allows Mike to escape, only for Ruger to force blood inside of her, causing her soul to leave her body.

Crow manages to convince some of the police force that had assisted in the earlier manhunt for Ruger to help with the vampiric threat, culminating in a showdown at Griswold's house that kills one of them and almost kills Vic. During this time the Red Wave begins to take effect in the town, with all paths of escape blown up by bombs and most of the townspeople taken out by candy and beverages spiked with psychedelic drugs. Most of the town is killed and Crow, Val, Mike, and the remaining police officer return to Griswold's home to keep him from rising. They are assisted in their efforts by Terry, who has transformed into a werewolf, but not before much of their group is dead. The group does barely manage to kill Griswold as outside help comes in to take care of the remaining living citizens of the town.

== Reception ==
Reception for the series was mixed to positive, with Dread Central praising the first two books. Publishers Weekly called the book "horror on a grand scale... reminiscent of Stephen King’s heftier works."

== Real world elements ==
Author Jonathan Maberry includes a number of real world elements in his novels, and this is most apparent in the final book of the trilogy, Bad Moon Rising. Pine Deep’s Halloween Festival is the centerpiece of the story and several actual celebrities from the horror industry appear as 'guest stars' including Ken Foree (star of the original Dawn of the Dead), makeup effects wizard Tom Savini, scream queens Brinke Stevens and Debbie Rochon, screenwriter Stephen Susco (The Grudge and Grudge 2), writer-director James Gunn (remake of Dawn of the Dead and Slither), drive-in movie critic Joe Bob Briggs, and actor, stuntman and haunted attraction consultant Jim O'Rear.

== Bibliography ==
- Maberry, Jonathan (June 2006). Ghost Road Blues. Pinnacle Books. ISBN 0-7860-1815-1. OCLC 69186176.
- Maberry, Jonathan (July 2007). Dead Man's Song. Pinnacle Books. ISBN 0-7860-1816-X. OCLC 144571430.
- Maberry, Jonathan (May 2008). Bad Moon Rising. Pinnacle Books. ISBN 0-7860-1817-8. OCLC 183263175.
