= Thomas Turino =

American ethnomusicologist and author (born 1951)

Thomas R. Turino (born December 12, 1951) is an American ethnomusicologist and author of several textbooks in the field, including the popular introductory book Music as Social Life: The Politics of Participation. His interests include the growth of nationalism through music and the role that music plays in creating the connections that define a society.

Raised in Saddle River, New Jersey, Turino graduated from Saddle River Day School in 1970.
