= Rot & Ruin =

2010 science fiction novel by Jonathan Maberry

- Author: Jonathan Maberry
- Cover artist: Christina Andrews
- Language: English
- Series: Rot & Ruin Series
- Genre: Science fiction
- Publisher: Simon & Schuster
- Publication date: United States: September, 2010 United Kingdom: August, 2011
- Publication place: United States
- Media type: Print (hardcover)
- Pages: 464
- Followed by: Dust & Decay

Rot & Ruin is a science fiction novel by American writer Jonathan Maberry, published by Simon & Schuster. It is an example of post-zombie apocalypse setting. Based upon the short story of the same name, the full-length novel was released in the United States September 2010 and in United Kingdom March 2011. It is the first in a series; its sequel, Dust & Decay, was released August 2011. Flesh and Bone was released in September 2012 and Fire and Ash was released August 2013. Bits and Pieces was released in September 2015. Set fourteen years after the zombie outbreak, the novel follows Benny Imura five months after he turns fifteen as he looks for a job so that his rations will not be halved. The novel is a third-person narrative that follows the protagonist, Benny Imura. Upon release, the book was generally well-received and received a majority of positive reviews.

== Synopsis ==
=== Setting ===
Fourteen years after the zombie outbreak, most living humans are spread out in small settlements relying on traders who pass through and the sparse gardens that a few people cultivate. Rot & Ruin is set in Mountainside, located in the Sierra Nevada mountains.

The Rot and Ruin, the land outside the fences, is the dangerous land where zombies live. Most people believe nothing of the old world exists beyond their enclave, and a sense of fatalistic survival pervades in the mind of most people who survived 'first night', the original zombie outbreak. Some of the younger generation are not ready to accept that as the only answer.

=== Plot summary ===
Following the zombie apocalypse, most people live in towns behind chain link fence, have surrendered most of the world, commonly referred to as 'the Rot & Ruin' to the undead. Having reached the age of 15 and no longer considered children, Benny Imura and his friend Louis Chong look for jobs. Benny resists the obvious option of apprenticing with his older, estranged brother Tom as zombie hunter (or as Tom refers to it, 'closure specialist'). Chong becomes a spotter for the local watch, but Benny finds no good fit and is still left without a job as his rations are about to be cut. Out of options, he finally asks Tom if he can be his apprentice. Tom accepts and the next morning they set out into the Rot and Ruin.

Travelling beyond the fence for the first time, Benny realizes that zombies are not monsters; they are victims and should be respected. Tom reveals to him the immorality of the hunters who maim the zombies to hunt them for sport, and how he differs from them, 'quieting' zombies at the behest of loved ones instead of bringing in zombie corpses for a bounty.

Benny and Tom go to a gated but abandoned suburban community known as Sunset Hollow, where Benny, Tom, and their family lived before the zombie outbreak. When they arrive at their former home, Tom explains that he has kept their infected parents trapped inside until Benny was old enough to help him 'quiet' their parents, giving them final peace. Tom needed Benny to be old enough to realize what Tom did wasn't just hunting the undead, but giving the infected and their loved ones closure, hence his reticence to destroy zombies randomly. Benny realizes that Tom was not a coward - he also comes to the realization that Tom rescued him from their infected parents the night of the outbreak. The brothers, reconciled in understanding and grief, collapse to the floor in tears, holding on to each other as they do.

Zombie Hunters have become a culture of celebrity and hero worship, including having trading cards made of them that are popular collectibles. A 'zombie card' of a nearly mythological girl known as 'The Lost Girl' piques Benny's interest. The card's artist, Rob Sacchetto, tells him more about the Lost Girl, who, despite being a small teenage girl, is reputed to have survived the Rot and Ruin on her own for years. Zombie Hunters Charlie Pink-eye and The Motor City Hammer stop Benny on his way home and demand he hand over the Lost Girl card. They threaten Benny, which reveals their true, violent evil nature to him, where he had admired both men previously. Tom arrives just in time to rescue Benny and escorts him home.

The incident sparks Benny's curiosity, and he, his friend Chong, as well as friends Morgie and romantic interest 'Nix' (short for Phoenix) Riley end up searching for The Lost Girl, but instead stumble across a horror called 'Gameland', where kidnapped children are forced to fight zombies for the entertainment of the crowd. Charlie Pink Eye and the Motor City Hammer have run the evil fighting pits for years, much to Tom's frustration. The Lost Girl turns out to be real, a young woman named Lilah who has experienced deep traumas living in the Rot and Ruin and as a result, has gone almost feral. She, the teens from town, and Tom combine forces to defeat Charlie, the Hammer and end Gameland forever.

On their trip home, Benny and Nix see a jumbo jet fly overhead, turn around, and fly away. They decide to pursue the jet and see where it came from.

== Awards ==
Rot & Ruin won the 2011 Eva Perry Mock Printz medal. It was also selected to be a finalist for the 2010 Cybils Award, and won the 2011 award. The novel also won four of the eleven nominations it received for Melinda Awards. It won Best Plot, Best Character Development for Benny, Best First Kiss for Benny and Nix, and Best Literary Boyfriend for Tom.

== Webtoon ==
In 2020, the book was adapted into a webcomic on Webtoon.
