= Grace Pak =

American cake artist

Grace "Grey" Pak
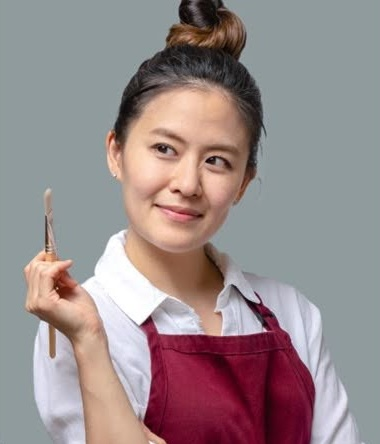
- Education: New York University (BFA) Columbia University (MS) International Culinary Center (Grand Diplôme)
- Occupation: Cake artist
- Years active: 2012–present
- Website: duchessofcameron.com

Grace "Grey" Pak is a fine art cake artist and entrepreneur based in New York City and Colorado. She is best known as the founder and owner of cake company Duchess of Cameron and for appearing in two seasons of the Netflix competition show Is It Cake?.

In early 2026, Duchess of Cameron was announced as an official Programming Partner of America250 to be the designer and project lead for the official cake of the United States' 250th birthday celebration in Washington, DC, in collaboration with Members of the US Congress and a team of Marine Corps chefs volunteering in their personal capacities and time.

== Education ==
Pak attended high school at Saddle River Day School in Saddle River, NJ. She then earned her BFA in Studio Art from New York University, where she was a Merit Scholar and a University Honors Scholar. Pak attended Columbia University to earn an M.S. in Neuroscience. A paper she co-authored was published in the Brain Sciences medical journal based on her clinical research work at the Columbia University Medical Center. She followed this with a Grand Diplôme with Distinction in Cake Techniques and Design from the International Culinary Center in New York City.

== Career ==
Pak founded cake company Duchess of Cameron in New York City in 2013.

=== Official Birthday Cake for the America Semiquincentennial ===
In early 2026, Pak was selected by the America250 organization and related Congressional Commission to serve as a Programming Partner and the cake artist for the official birthday cake for the 250th birthday of the United States. The cake project spanned several months and involved bipartisan participation from Members of Congress from all 50 US states, 5 territories, and the District of Columbia to symbolically represent all Americans in the making of the "gift to the nation" cake. Pak also received support with the making of the cake from a team of five Marine chefs, who volunteered on the project in their personal capacities and worked with Pak on prior projects, including for the US Marine Corps' 250th birthday in November 2025.

Members of Congress and the Washington, DC government personally contributed by hand to create or finish decorative elements that represented their respective constituencies. Pak visited most of these contributors in their Washington, DC offices on Capitol Hill.

Congressional Contributors
State/Territory/District	Name	Party	Cake Element
Alabama	Rep. Robert Aderholt	Republican	V8 engine
Alaska	Sen. Lisa Murkowski	Republican	Iditarod dog sled
American Samoa	Rep. Aumua Amata Coleman Radewagen	Republican	Fly whisk ("fue") and war club ("uatogi")
Arizona	Sen. Mark Kelly	Democratic	Grand Canyon
Arkansas	Rep. French Hill	Republican	Rice stalk
California	Rep. Norma Torres	Democratic	Film camera
Colorado	Rep. Diana DeGette	Democratic	Quantum particle
Connecticut	Sen. Chris Murphy	Democratic	Black Hawk helicopter
Delaware	Sen. Chris Coons	Democratic	"Fightin' Blue Hen"
District of Columbia	Senior Advisor to the Mayor Lindsey Parker		Washington, DC flag
Florida	Rep. Gus Bilirakis	Republican	Rocket
Florida	Rep. Anna Paulina Luna	Republican	Rocket
Georgia	Rep. Andrew Clyde	Republican	Rifle
Guam	Rep. James Moylan	Republican	Proa boat
Hawaii	Sen. Mazie Hirono	Democratic	Traditional Hawaiian quilt with taro design
Idaho	Rep. Russ Felcher	Republican	Horn of Plenty
Idaho	Rep. Mike Simpson	Republican	Horn of Plenty
Illinois	Rep. Nikki Budzinski	Democratic	Ear of corn and USPS mailbox (with Rep. Bergman, R-MI)
Indiana	Rep. Rudy Yakym	Republican	IndyCar
Iowa	Rep. Zach Nunn	Republican	Pig
Kansas	Rep. Tracey Mann	Republican	Sunflower
Kentucky	Rep. Hal Rogers	Republican	Banjo
Louisiana	Rep. Troy Carter	Democratic	Mardi Gras beads
Maine	Rep. Chellie Pingree	Democratic	
Maryland	Rep. Jamie Raskin	Democratic	Blue crab
Massachusetts	Rep. Lori Trahan	Democratic	DNA molecule with CRISPR
Michigan	Rep. Jack Bergman	Republican	Rocket motor and USPS mailbox (with Rep. Budzinski, D-IL)
Minnesota	Sen. Amy Klobuchar	Democratic	Hockey sticks and loon
Mississippi	Sen. Cindy Hyde-Smith	Republican	Catfish
Missouri	Rep. Wesley Bell	Democratic	F-15
Montana	Rep. Ryan Zinke	Republican	Rainbow trout
Nebraska	Rep. Mike Flood	Republican	Nebraska state capitol building
Nevada	Rep. Susie Lee	Democratic	Red Rock Canyon
New Hampshire	Rep. Maggie Goodlander	Democratic	Granite quarry
New Jersey	Rep. Bonnie Watson Coleman	Democratic	Diner sign
New Mexico	Rep. Gabe Vasquez	Democratic	Hot air balloon
New York	Rep. Tom Suozzi	Democratic	Empire State Building and NYC yellow cab
North Carolina	Rep. Don Davis	Democratic	Flue-cured tobacco
North Dakota	Rep. Julie Fedorchak	Republic	Honey and prairie rose
Northern Mariana Islands	Rep. Kimberlyn King-Hinds	Republican	Latte stones
Ohio	Rep. Marcy Kaptur	Democratic	"Dotting the 'I'"
Oklahoma	Rep. Stephanie Bice	Republican	OKC basketball
Oregon	Rep. Suzanne Bonamici	Democratic	Christmas tree
Pennsylvania	Rep. Chrissy Houlahan	Democratic	Steel beams and mushrooms
Puerto Rico	Rep. Pablo José Hernández	Democratic	Pava hat
Rhode Island	Rep. Gabe Amo	Democratic	Submarine
South Carolina	Rep. Sheri Biggs	Republican	Peaches
South Carolina	Rep. Joe Wilson	Republican	Peaches
South Dakota	Rep. Dusty Johnson	Republican	Bison
Tennessee	Rep. John Rose	Republican	Fiddle
Texas	Rep. August Pfluger	Republican	Oil derrick and pumpjack
US Virgin Islands	Rep. Stacey Plaskett	Democratic	Conch shell
Utah	Rep. Burgess Owens	Republican	Beehive
Vermont	Sen. Peter Welch	Democratic	Maple tap
Virginia	Rep. Jen Kiggans	Republican	Aircraft carrier
Washington	Rep. Emily Randall	Democratic	Washington State Ferry
West Virginia	Sen. Shelley Moore Capito	Republican	New River Gorge bridge
Wisconsin	Rep. Gwen Moore	Democratic	Cheese wheel
Wyoming	Sen. Cynthia Lummis	Republican	Bucking horse

The completed cake was unveiled to the public at the National Birthday Cake Tribute ceremony on July 4th, 2026 at the Library of Congress James Madison Building, hosted by America250. Pak delivered remarks alongside America250's VP of Government Relations, Thomas Jensen, as well as Representatives Vicente Gonzalez (D-TX) and Rudy Yakym (R-IN). The ceremony concluded with Reps. Gonzalez, Yakym, and Julie Fedorchak (R-ND) joining Pak in presenting the first slices of cake to a Tiger Scout and a Daisy Scout, symbolizing the present generation's service to the next generation. Reps. Fedorchak and Yakym were also Congressional contributors to the cake.

== Personal life ==
Pak says little publicly about her personal life, but has mentioned she is married, lives in New York City and Colorado, and grew up in northern New Jersey.

She is a fan of Formula 1 and attends races.

== Media appearances ==
Year	Type	Outlet	Title	Role	Streaming/Accessible On
2026	TV news	NBC4	"Behind the making of America's bipartisan birthday cake"	Story feature	NBC
2026	TV news	CNN	America 250 special event live coverage with Dana Bash and Boris Sanchez	Guest interviewee	CNN
2026	TV news	CNN	Inside Politics with Dana Bash	Story feature, guest interviewee	CNN
2026	Print news	New York Times	"Making America's Birthday Cake"	Story feature	New York Times
2026	Podcast	Politicology	"American Made"	Guest interviewee	Spotify, Apple Podcasts
2026	Podcast	The Sporkful with Dan Pashman onSiriusXM	"What Will America’s 250th Birthday Cake Look Like?"	Guest interviewee	Spotify, SiriusXM, Apple Podcasts, Amazon Music
2025	TV show	Food Network	Super Mega Cakes	Team Duff	HBO Max, Prime Video
2024	TV show	Netflix	Is It Cake? Holiday (All-stars)	Contestant	Netflix
2024	TV show	Netflix	Is It Cak3? (Is It Cake? Season 3)	Contestant	Netflix
2023	TV show	Cooking Channel	Stab That Cake!	Contestant	Discovery+, HBO Max, Disney+
2021	TV show	Food Network	Buddy vs. Duff	Judge	HBO Max, Disney+
2020	TV show	Food Network	Candy Land	Contestant	
2018	TV show	Food Network	Ridiculous Cakes	Contestant	
