= Schandra Singh =

American artist (born 1977)

Schandra Singh (born 1977) is an American artist.

== Biography ==
Schandra Singh is a first generation American, born in Suffern, New York, to immigrant parents. She is the daughter of Anand Singh, an Indian Maharaja and Gisa Singh (née Voigt) an Austrian model. She is the sister of actress Sabine Singh. She graduated from Saddle River Day School in 1985, received a MFA from Yale School of Art in 2006 and her BFA from Rhode Island School of Design in 1999.

Singh's large-scale paintings show people in relaxing situations as a form of escape from distress. Stylized and satirical, Singh’s oil works appear to be preoccupied by the absurdity of social notions of rest at a time of incredible unrest. She has been featured in numerous exhibitions in America, Europe and Asia, including: The Saatchi Gallery, London; Sébastien Bertrand, Switzerland; Nature Morte, NY and Berlin; Thomas Erben, NY; MOCA, Shanghai.

In April 2013, Singh was the focus of a story on the public radio program This American Life, where she recounted a tale of her correspondence with a mysterious man in London whose autistic son was a fan of her work. She was also featured in the podcast entitled ‘What Are The Economics of Art’ for The Economist, which won the Gold Lovie award for top podcast in Europe in 2017. Singh’s painting and voice were used to advertise the win.

Her painting about her personal experience of 9/11 in this interview has also been featured in New York Magazine. The 9/11 painting and other of her works were also featured in Elle Magazine, Vogue India, The Wall St. Journal India, and The Wall St. Journal (United States).

== Selected exhibitions ==
- 2010: If I'm Immune To It, I Don't Deserve To Be Here, Bose Pacia, New York, NY, USA
- 2009: The Empire Strikes Back: Indian Art Today, The Saatchi Gallery, London, UK
- 2008: The Sun is not Ridiculous, Galerie Bertrand & Gruner, Geneva, Switzerland
- 2007: Around and Around 1000 Times, RARE, New York; SCOPE New York, Lincoln Center
- 2006: Holiday Show, Baumgartner Gallery, New York
- 2003: Cleary, Gottlieb, Steen & Hamilton, New York; Broom Street Studio Inc., Woodstock
- 2002: Cycle de Vie, Black Box Studio, Los Angeles
- 1999: Invitational Show, Woods Gerry Gallery, Providence
