= Saddle River Day School =

Prep school in Saddle River, New Jersey, US

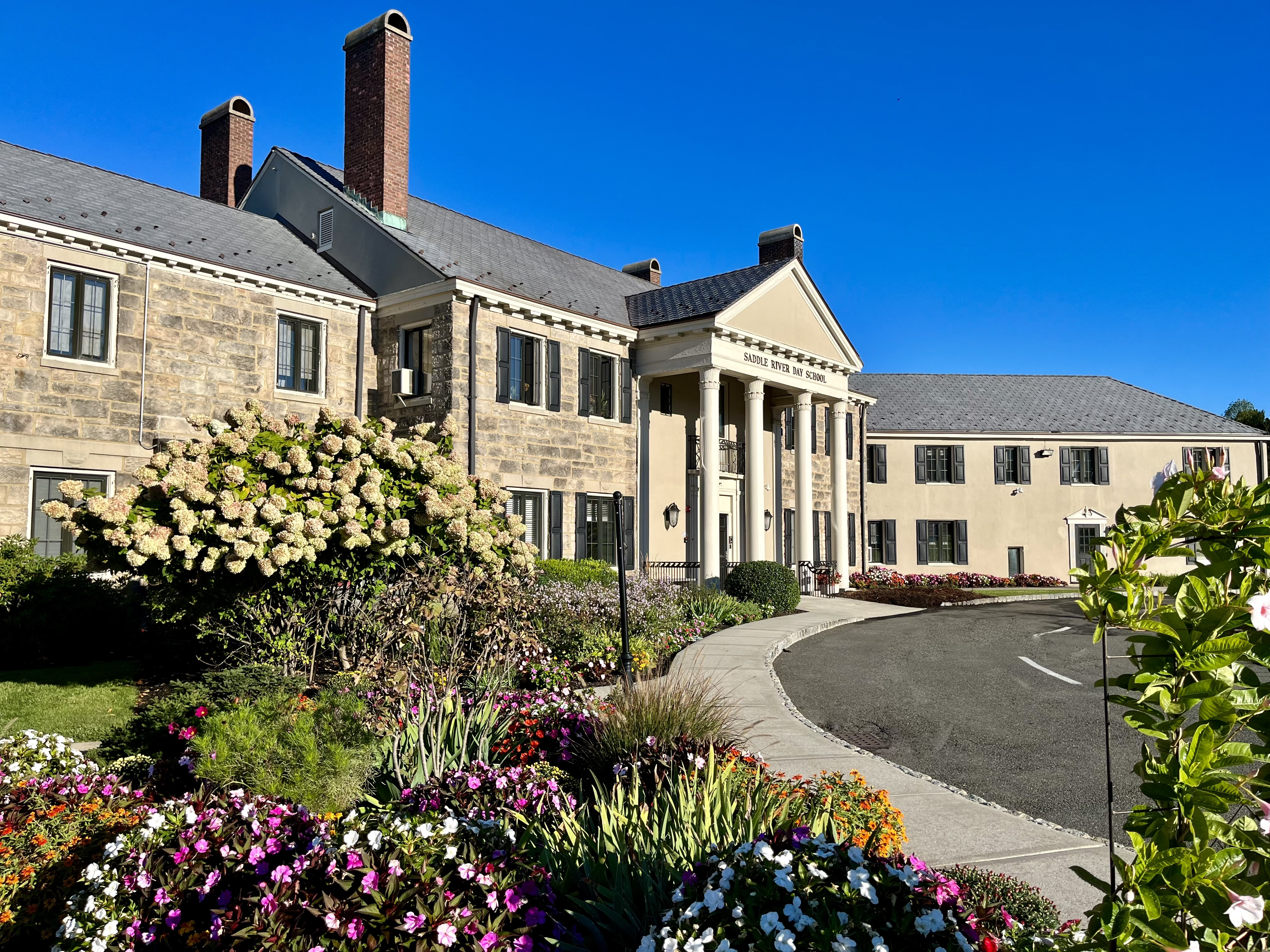

Location
- 147 Chestnut Ridge Road; Saddle River, Bergen County, New Jersey 07458; United States
- 41.030607°N 74.084815°W

Information
- Type: Private Day school
- Established: 1957
- NCES School ID: 00868768
- Head of school: Jalaj Desai
- Faculty: 61.0 FTEs
- Grades: K–12
- Enrollment: 447 (plus 33 in PreK, as of 2023–24)
- Student to teacher ratio: 7.3:1
- Campus: Suburban
- Colors: Navy blue Red and white
- Team name: Rebels
- Publication: Periscope (Alumni); Parents Guild Newslink
- Newspaper: The Rebel Report
- Yearbook: Retrospect
- Tuition: $54,100 (9–11), $55,100 (12) for 2026–27
- Website: www.saddleriverday.org

Saddle River Day School is a coeducational, college-preparatory independent day school, located in Saddle River, in Bergen County, New Jersey, serving students in Pre-K3 through twelfth grade. Its student body is drawn from communities in Bergen, Essex, Morris and Passaic counties in New Jersey and Rockland County in New York.

Saddle River Day School has three divisions: the Lower Division, the Middle Division, and the Upper Division. In 1966 it received accreditation from the Middle States Association of Colleges and Schools, which expires in July 2027. The school is also accredited by the New Jersey Department of Education and is a member of the New Jersey Association of Independent Schools and the National Association of Independent Schools.

As of the 2023–24 school year, the school had an enrollment of 447 students (plus 33 in PreK) and 61.0 classroom teachers (on an FTE basis), for a student–teacher ratio of 7.3:1.

== History ==
Saddle River Country Day School, founded by John C. and Diane M. Alford on June 24, 1957, opened in September 1960 after overcoming zoning disputes. Originally housed in a mansion on the Denison estate, the school served grades five through twelve with an initial enrollment of forty-five students. Over the years, the school expanded significantly, adding new buildings like Alford Hall and North Hall, growing its student body, and enhancing its academic and extracurricular programs. The school was renamed Saddle River Day School in 1980. Despite facing challenges in the early 1990s, including a decline in enrollment and leadership changes, the school rebounded, introducing new programs and expanding its facilities.

The campus currently features three buildings:

Main Hall: Houses the Lower School and offices for the Headmaster, Admissions, Development, Finance, and Administrative staff.

Alford Hall: Used by the middle school, Alford Hall features science and mathematics classrooms, the Athansia M. Tsoukas Laboratory, the Margaret Clark Laboratory, facilities for art and music, the entire performing Arts Center, and the Connell Science Wing.

North Hall: Contains the offices of the Upper School Dean, the Dean of Students, and the Director of College Placement. North Hall also includes The Center for Innovation and Entrepreneurship (CIE), a full kitchen, senior commons, a gymnasium, locker rooms, a fitness room, and a music room.

The "Building the Future" campaign successfully funded a fourth building (Hall of Science and Entrepreneurship), with an expected completion date of mid-2025.

== Curriculum ==
The Lower School utilizes phonics for language arts instruction. An IDEAS Lab (Innovation, Design, Engineering, Arts, and Science) encourages constructionism through student interactions with their physical environment. This manifests through lessons in robotics, critical thinking, 3D design, and basic coding. Foreign language instruction begins in Kindergarten, and continues as a requirement through 12th grade.

The Middle School offers a robust curriculum, with accelerated tracks in Science and Math, three world languages (Spanish, French, and Arabic), in addition to introductory courses in Business and Graphic Design.

The Upper School offers the following nineteen Advanced Placement courses: English Literature, English Language, United States History, European History, Human Geography, World History, Psychology, Macroeconomics, Music Theory, French, Spanish, Calculus AB and BC, Statistics, Biology, Physics C: Mechanics, Chemistry, Computer Science Principles and A.

Additionally, Upper School students can select a diverse range of electives from Linear Algebra, Artificial Intelligence, Middle Eastern Studies, and Photography.

Saddle River Day School also offers students in the 9th-12th grades the opportunity to participate in the yearly French Exchange Program. This program includes a two-week homestay in alternate years in Dijon, France.

== Athletics ==
The Saddle River Day School Rebels participate in the North Jersey Interscholastic Conference, which is comprised of small-enrollment schools in Bergen, Hudson, Morris and Passaic counties, and was created following a reorganization of sports leagues in Northern New Jersey by the New Jersey State Interscholastic Athletic Association (NJSIAA). Previously, the school was a member of the all-private Patriot Conference, but after a decision by the NJSIAA in February 2008, both Hawthorne Christian Academy and Saddle River Day School joined the Olympic Division of the Bergen County Scholastic League (BCSL) later that year, and remained in the conference until it was disbanded as part of the NJSIAA's 2010 realignment. The BCSL was disbanded as a part of a wide-ranging realignment of high school sports in northern New Jersey, and Saddle River Day moved to the new NJIC in the fall of 2010. With 133 students in grades 10-12, the school was classified by the NJSIAA for the 2019–20 school year as Non-Public B for most athletic competition purposes, which included schools with an enrollment of 37 to 366 students in that grade range (equivalent to Group II for public schools).

The girls basketball team won the Non-Public Group B state title in 2018 (defeating Rutgers Preparatory School in the tournament final) and 2019 (vs. Trenton Catholic Academy), and was declared as the Non-Public North B sectional champion in 2020 after finals were cancelled due to COVID-19. The team won their first title with a 73-49 win against Rutgers Prep in the finals of the Non-Public B tournament final. The 2019 team repeated as winner of the Non-Public B title against Trenton Catholic by a score of 79-67 in the title game. The teams advanced to the Tournament of Champions both seasons. In 2018, the team was the fifth seed, winning the quarterfinals by 92-63 against fourth-seeded University High School before losing to number-one seed Manasquan High School 80-67 in the semifinal game played at the RWJBarnabas Health Arena to finish at 24-7 for the season. The 2019 team was the second seed and won the semifinal round by a score of 76-63 against number-three seed Manchester Township High School before losing in the finals to top seed Franklin High School by a score of 65-57 and finishing the season at 28-3.

== Notable alumni ==
- Jay Feinberg (born 1968, class of 1986), founder and CEO of the Gift of Life Marrow Registry
- Jeremy Glick (1970–2001), a passenger on Flight 93 on September 11, 2001
- J. Mackye Gruber (born 1972, class of 1990), screenwriter and film director
- Natalie Jane (class of 2022), singer-songwriter
- Tor Lundvall (born 1968, class of 1987), painter and musician
- Aline Brosh McKenna (born 1967), screenwriter for 27 Dresses and The Devil Wears Prada
- Grace Pak (born 1987, class of 2005), cake designer featured on Netflix show Is It Cake?
- Danielle Pinnock (born 1988), actress, comedian and writer
- Lisa Rogak, author, primarily of biographies and other non-fiction books
- Schandra Singh (born 1977, class of 1995), artist whose work has been featured in New York, Elle and The Wall Street Journal
- Thomas Turino (born 1951, class of 1970), ethnomusicologist and author of several textbooks in the field
- Donna Thorland (born 1973, class of 1991), author and screenwriter
