= L. Dean James =

American fantasy and horror writer (1947–2018)

Lana Dean James (born 1947) is an American fantasy and horror writer. She co-authored Winter Scream (1991) with Chris Curry. It was both authors' debut novel, and was nominated for the 1991 Bram Stoker Award for Best First Novel. TSR, Inc. published James' trilogy "Red Kings of Wynnamyr". It consisted of Sorcerer's Stone (1991), Kingslayer (1992) and The Book of Stones (1993). James writes as L. Dean James and used the pen name Lisa Dean in her collaborations with Curry.

== Bibliography ==
All works are listed chronologically.

=== Novels ===
- Sorcerer's Stone (1991, TSR, ISBN 1-56076-074-5)
- Winter Scream (1991, Pocket, ISBN 0-671-68433-7, coauthored with Chris Curry)
- Kingslayer (1992, TSR, ISBN 1-56076-398-1)
- The Book of Stones (1993, TSR, ISBN 0-09-931701-X (UK), ISBN 978-1-56076-639-1 (US))
- Summerland (1994, Avon, ISBN 978-0-380-77325-1)
- Mojave Wells (1994, Avon, ISBN 0-380-77324-4)
- Cowgirls of the Mariposa (as Lana Dean James, 1995, Harpercollins, ISBN 0-06-106369-X)
