= Courtney Alameda =

American novelist

Courtney Alameda is an American novelist. She is author of the novels Shutter (2015), Pitch Dark (2018), Seven Deadly Shadows (2020; with Valynne E. Maetani), and World of Warcraft: War of the Scaleborn (2023), as well as co-creator of the Sons of Anarchy comic book Sisters of Sorrow.

== Biography ==
Courtney Alameda was born and raised in the San Francisco Bay Area, daughter of a police officer. She attended Brigham Young University, where she studied creative writing and obtained a degree in English. She also worked at a Barnes and Noble and the Provo City Library, specializing in adult and teen services at the latter.

Alameda made her debut with the 2015 young adult horror novel Shutter, for which she was nominated for the 2015 Bram Stoker Award for Best First Novel. In 2018, she published another young adult horror novel, a sci-fi named Pitch Dark; she was a finalist for the 2018 Cybils Award for Young Adult Speculative Fiction for that novel. She and Valynne E. Maetani co-authored Seven Deadly Shadows, a 2020 fantasy horror retelling of the 1954 film Seven Samurai. Silvana Reyes Lopez of Book Riot said: "You cannot not mention Courtney Alameda in a list of YA horror novels."

Alameda co-created the Sons of Anarchy comic book Sisters of Sorrow, which premiered in 2017. She authored World of Warcraft: War of the Scaleborn, a 2023 novelization of the video game's Dragonflight chapter. She wrote a short story for Don't Turn Out the Lights, a collection of tales inspired by Alvin Schwartz.

Alameda is Latina. A resident of Salt Lake City, She is married and owns a Welsh Corgi dog.

== Bibliography ==
- Shutter (2015) (Note: Reviews of this book:)
- Pitch Dark (2018)
- Seven Deadly Shadows (2020) (Note: Reviews of this book:)
- World of Warcraft: War of the Scaleborn (2023)
