= The Suicide Collectors =

2008 novel by David Oppegaard

- First edition cover
- Author: David Oppegaard
- Cover artist: Michelle Taormina
- Language: English
- Genre: Speculative Fiction
- Publisher: St. Martin's Press
- Publication date: December 2008
- Media type: Print (Hardcover, Paperback)
- Pages: 304
- ISBN: 978-0-312-38110-3

The Suicide Collectors is the debut novel of American author David Oppegaard. Published by St. Martin's Press in December 2008, it was a finalist for the 2008 Bram Stoker Award for Superior Achievement in a First Novel, awarded by the Horror Writers Association.

== Synopsis ==
The Suicide Collectors is set in a near future version of North America. A mysterious plague called the Despair has ravaged the earth, causing roughly 90% of its population to commit suicide. The Collectors appear after each suicide to collect the bodies. The story centers on Norman who leaves Florida on a journey to Seattle where a doctor may have a cure for the Despair.

== Reception ==
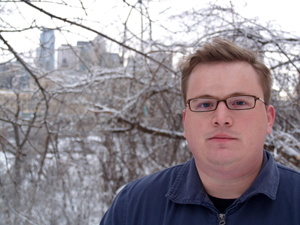
Oppegaard.

Publishers Weekly praised Oppegaard's "eloquent prose and haunting characters." Bookmarks Magazine said critics were "clearly affected by the images that populate Oppegaard's sorrowful world."
