= Rex Miller =

American novelist

- Rex Miller, date unknown
- Born: April 25, 1939; Sikeston, Missouri
- Died: May 21, 2004 (aged 65); Sikeston, Missouri
- Occupations: Writer, disc jockey
- Spouse: Carol Spangberg
- Writing career
- Genres: Horror, war novel
- Notable work: Slob
- Movement: Splatterpunk

Rex Miller Spangberg (April 25, 1939 – May 21, 2004), known professionally as Rex Miller, was an American novelist. He wrote a series of novels detailing the investigations of Jack Eichord, a fictional homicide detective who specialized in tracking down serial killers. Slob, the first novel in the series, introduced the character of Daniel Bunkowski, a half-ton killing-machine. In 1987, Miller was nominated for the Bram Stoker Award for Best First Novel for writing Slob.

Miller resurrected Daniel Bunkowski for three novels, Chaingang, Savant, and Butcher, that take place outside of the continuity of the Eichord series. Miller also wrote Profane Men, a novel set during the Vietnam War, in addition to the limited-edition novel St. Louis Blues.

Miller was also a popular disc jockey in the 1960s, and was considered an expert in the field of juvenile-related collectibles, particularly old time radio premiums.

Miller died in Sikeston, Missouri, on May 21, 2004, at the age of 65.

== Works by Miller ==
Chaingang (Daniel Bunkowski) series

- Slob (1987)
- Slice (1990)
- Chaingang (1992)
- Savant (1994)
- Butcher (1994)

Stand-alone novels

- Frenzy (1988)
- Stone Shadow (1989)
- Profane Men (1989)
- Iceman (1990)
- Saint Louis Blues (1992)

Anthologies containing stories by Rex Miller

- Hot Blood: Tales of Provocative Horror (1989)
- Masques III (1989)
- Stalkers (1990)
- Dick Tracy – The Secret Files (1990)
- Masques IV (1991)
- Hotter Blood: More Tales of Erotic Horror (1991)
- Solved (1991)
- Invitation To Murder (1991)
- Shock Rock (1992)
- Midnight Graffiti (1992)
- Hottest Blood (1993)
- Frankenstein: The Monster Wakes (1993)
- Predators (1993)
- Murder On Main Street (1993)
- Shock Rock II (1994)
- The Hot Blood Series: Deadly After Dark (1994)
- Dark Destiny: Proprietors of Fate (1995)
- Forbidden Acts (1995)
- The Hot Blood Series: Seeds of Fear (1995)
- Fear Itself (1995)
- It Came From The Drive-In (1996)
- The Hot Blood Series: Kiss and Kill (1997)
- The Crow: Shattered Lives and Broken Dreams (1998)

== See also ==
- List of horror fiction authors
- Splatterpunk
