= David Oppegaard =

American novelist (born 1979)

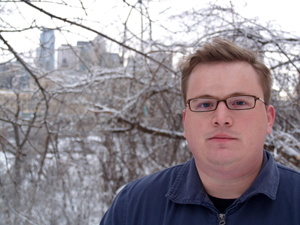
- Oppegaard in 2011
- Born: August 19, 1979 (age 47); Saint Paul, Minnesota, U.S.
- Education: Saint Olaf College (BA); Hamline University (MFA)
- Occupation: Novelist
- Writing career
- Language: English
- Notable work: The Suicide Collectors
- Website: davidoppegaard.com

David Oppegaard (born August 19, 1979) is an American novelist.

== Early life and education ==
Born in Saint Paul, Minnesota, Oppegaard earned a Bachelor of Arts degree from Saint Olaf College in Northfield, Minnesota, and a Master of Fine Arts degree from Hamline University in Saint Paul.

== Career ==
Oppegaard's first novel, The Suicide Collectors, was published in 2008. It was nominated for the Bram Stoker Award for Best First Novel by the Horror Writers Association. Oppegaard has published several subsequent novels and young-adult books, including the 2016 Minnesota Book Award finalist The Firebug of Balrog County and The Town Built on Sorrow.

Oppegaard's most recent novel is Claw Heart Mountain from CamCat Books (2023).

== Bibliography ==
- 2008 The Suicide Collectors
- 2009 Wormwood, Nevada
- 2012 The Ragged Mountains
- 2014 And the Hills Opened Up
- 2014 Breakneck Cove (novella)
- 2015 The Firebug of Balrog County
- 2017 The Town Built on Sorrow
- 2023 Claw Heart Mountain
