= Lisa Rogak =

American writer

Lisa Angowski Rogak is an American author, primarily of biographies and other non-fiction books. She is also a freelance magazine writer.

Barack Obama: In His Own Words, which Rogak edited, hit the New York Times bestseller list. Her biography of Stephen King, Haunted Heart, was nominated for a 2010 Edgar Award for Best Critical / Biographical Work.

Raised in Glen Rock, New Jersey, Rogak graduated from Saddle River Day School and briefly attended New York University before moving to New Hampshire.

== Partial bibliography ==
- Pretzel Logic: A Novel, Williams Hill Publishing, 1999
- Howard Dean: In His Own Words, St. Martin's Griffin/Thomas Dunne Books, 2003
- Death Warmed Over: Funeral Food, Rituals, and Customs from Around the World, Ten Speed Press, 2004
- Stones and Bones of New England: A Guide to Unusual, Historic, and Otherwise Notable Cemeteries, Globe Pequot, 2004
- The Man Behind the Da Vinci Code: An Unauthorized Biography of Dan Brown, Andrews McMeel Publishing, 2005
- Barack Obama: In His Own Words, PublicAffairs, 2008
- A Boy Named Shel: The Life and Times of Shel Silverstein, St. Martin's Griffin/Thomas Dunne Books, 2009
- Michelle Obama: In Her Own Words, PublicAffairs, 2009
- Haunted Heart: The Life and Times of Stephen King, St. Martin's Griffin/Thomas Dunne Books, 2010
- And Nothing But the Truthiness: The Rise (and further rise) of Stephen Colbert, St. Martin's Griffin/Thomas Dunne Books, 2011
- Dogs of War: The Courage, Love, and Loyalty of Military Working Dogs, St. Martin's Griffin/Thomas Dunne Books, 2011
- Dogs of Courage: The Heroism and Heart of Working Dogs Around the World, St. Martin's Press, 2012
- Dan Brown: The Unauthorized Biography, St. Martin's Press, 2013
- One Big Happy Family: Heartwarming Stories of Animals Caring for One Another, St. Martin's Press, 2013
- Angry Optimist: The Life and Times of Jon Stewart, Thomas Dunne Books, 2014
- Cats on the Job: 50 Fabulous Felines Who Purr, Mouse, and Even Sing for Their Supper, St. Martin's Press, 2015
- The True Tails of Baker and Taylor: The Library Cats Who Left Their Pawprints on a Small Town . . . and the World, St. Martin's Press, 2016
- Rachel Maddow: A Biography, St. Martin's Press/Thomas Dunne Books, 2020
- Who is Alex Trebek?: A Biography, St. Martin's Press/Thomas Dunne Books, 2020
- Propaganda Girls: The Secret War of the Women in the OSS, St. Martin's Press, 2025
