= Tamara Thorne =

American writer (born 1957)

- Born: November 20, 1957 (age 68); Los Angeles, California, U.S.
- Occupation: Writer
- Writing career
- Pen name: Chris Curry
- Language: English
- Period: 1991 to present
- Genre: Horror
- Notable awards: Bram Stoker Award (nominated, 1991)
- Website: tamarathorne.com

Tamara Thorne (born 20 November 1957 in Los Angeles, California), who also writes under the pen name Chris Curry, is a well-known, bestselling American horror writer. Her novel Winter Scream, co-authored with L. Dean James, was nominated for the 1991 Bram Stoker Award for Best First Novel. She has authored nearly 20 novels, including two novel series, multiple anthologies and several stand-alone works. They tend to be set in the Los Angeles area, where she has lived since she was born.

== Biography ==
Tamara Thorne was born in August 1957 in Los Angeles, California. She published her first novel, Winter Scream, in February 1991 under her pen name Chris Curry. The book was coauthored with L. Dean James. Since then, Thorne has authored nearly 20 novels, both standalone and in series. She authored two other series under her own name: the Sorority in 2003, and The Ghosts of Ravencrest series, coauthored with Alistair Cross, in 2014 and 2015.

Many of her books have sold strongly and she is well known in her chosen genre of horror.

== Writing ==
According to the Los Angeles Times, Thorne's novels are set in "made-up burgs" on the edge of Los Angeles, but Californians see the town in Bad Things as sounding a lot like Redlands, California, where Hollywood stars used to live. Moonfall resembles Oak Glen, and the "scary high desert retreat" in Thunder Road is drawn from Calico Ghost Town. Thorn responds that "My natural mind-set is bound to Los Angeles and the Inland Empire,...and in my books I like to use history and folklore from the real places."

== Reception ==
Thorne was nominated for the 1991 Bram Stoker Award for Best First Novel. The Horror Zine describes Thorne as being "a bestselling author between 1991 and 2002." The Los Angeles Times describes her as a "successful practitioner [of] terror."

The British horror writer Graham Masterton named a character in his Forest Ghost novel for Thorne.

== Bibliography ==
=== Novels ===
- Haunted (1991, Pinnacle, ISBN 0-7860-1684-1) (reviews:)
- Moonfall (1996, Pinnacle, ISBN 0-7860-1600-0)
- Body House (1999, Pinnacle, ISBN 0-8217-4467-4)
- Candle Bay (2001, Pinnacle, ISBN 0-7860-1311-7)
- Eternity (2001, Pinnacle, ISBN 0-7860-1310-9) (listed in The Year's Best Fantasy and Horror)
- Bad Things (2002, Pinnacle, ISBN 0-7860-1477-6)
- The Forgotten (2002, Pinnacle, ISBN 0-7860-1475-X) (review:)
- The Cliffhouse Haunting (2015, Glass Apple Press (ebook), coauthored with Alistair Cross)

==== Sorority series ====
- Eve (2003, Pinnacle, ISBN 0-7860-1539-X)
- Merilynn (2003, Pinnacle, ISBN 0-7394-3709-7 (hardcover), ISBN 0-7860-1540-3 (paperback))
- Samantha (2003, Pinnacle, ISBN 0-7394-3764-X (hardcover), ISBN 0-7860-1541-1 (paperback))
- The Sorority (2013, Kensington ISBN 0758285515; trilogy reissue of all three "sorority" novels)

==== The Ghosts of Ravencrest series ====
These titles were coauthored with Alistair Cross.

- Darker Shadows (2014, Glass Apple Press (ebook))
- Christmas Spirits (2014, Glass Apple Press (ebook))
- Night Moves (2015, Glass Apple Press (ebook))
- Dead Girls (2015, Glass Apple Press (ebook))

==== As Chris Curry ====
- Winter Scream (1991, Pocket, ISBN 0-671-68433-7, coauthored with L. Dean James)
- Trickster (1992, Pocket, ISBN 0-671-68434-5, coauthored with Lisa Dean)
- Panic (1993, Pocket, ISBN 0-671-74947-1)
- Thunder Road (1995, Pocket, ISBN 0-671-89737-3, was inspired by Calico Ghost Town. Reissued by Pinnacle in 2004. (review:)

=== Anthologies ===
These anthologies contain works by Thorne.

- Dark Seductions (1993, Zebra, ISBN 0-8217-4331-7)
- The Devil's Wine (2004, Cemetery Dance Publications, ISBN 1-58767-070-4, collection of poetry)

=== Nonfiction ===
- Ghosthunting Southern California: America's Haunted Road Trip with John B. Kachuba (2010, Clerisy, ISBN 1578604567)
