= Patient Zero: A Joe Ledger Novel =

2009 novel by Jonathan Maberry

Patient Zero
- Author: Jonathan Maberry
- Language: English
- Series: Joe Ledger Series
- Publisher: St. Martin's Griffin
- Publication date: March 3, 2009
- Media type: Print, e-book
- Pages: 432
- ISBN: 0312382855
- Followed by: The Dragon Factory

Patient Zero is a 2009 novel by American writer Jonathan Maberry and the first book in the Joe Ledger series. It was first published on March 3, 2009 through St. Martin's Griffin and follows a detective that must help prevent the world from being terrorized by a bioweapon that turns humans into zombies.

== Plot summary ==
The story follows Joe Ledger, a Baltimore detective, who is recruited into the Department of Military Sciences, a specialized entity of the US Government which answers only to the President, to prevent a terrorist plot against America. El Mujahid and his associates create a prion disease which causes victims to expire, then re-animate with minimal brain function; enough to find, attack and infect more people with "Seif al Din". Joe Ledger and the Department of Military Sciences must stop El Mujahid before he can release his newer and much more powerful strain of the pathogen in Philadelphia.

== Reception ==
Critical reception for Patient Zero has been largely positive and the book was nominated for a Bram Stoker Award. The book received positive reviews from the SF Site, New Straits Times, and The Gazette.
