= Jonathan Maberry =

American author (born 1958)

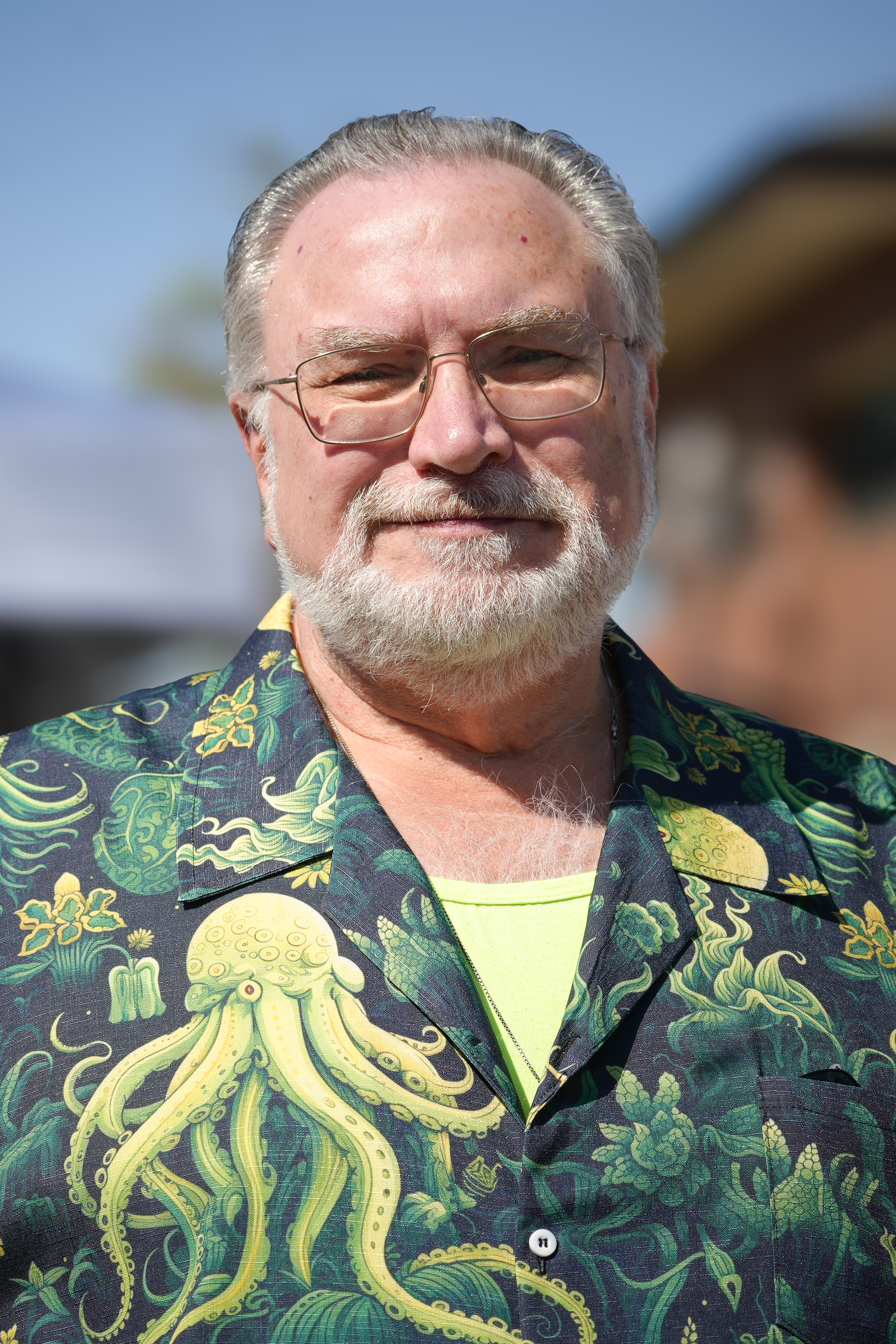
- Maberry at the San Diego Writers Festival 2026
- Born: May 18, 1958 (age 68); Kensington, Philadelphia
- Education: Temple University
- Occupation: Author
- Spouse: Sara Jo
- Writing career
- Pen name: Shane MacDougall
- Genre: Suspense fiction
- Notable works: Ghost Road Blues, Rot & Ruin, Dust and Decay, Flesh & Bone, "Fire and Ash"
- Notable awards: Multiple Bram Stoker Awards
- Website: Official website

Jonathan Maberry (born May 18, 1958) is an American suspense author, anthology editor, comic book writer, magazine feature writer, playwright, content creator and writing teacher/lecturer. He has been named one of the "Today's Top Ten Horror Writers" by Horror Novel Reviews.

== Early life ==
Jonathan Maberry was born in Kensington, Philadelphia, attended Frankford High School, and then went on to Temple University. Growing up in a rough neighborhood, he began learning martial arts at the age of 6.

== Career ==
=== Author ===
Maberry's early work featured martial arts as a topic, such as Judo and You (Kendall Hunt 1990), Ultimate Jujutsu (Strider Nolan, 2002) and Ultimate Sparring (Strider Nolan 2003).

In the next phase of his career, he departed from martial arts writing and wrote several books on the folklore and beliefs of the occult and paranormal, including The Vampire Slayers Field Guide to the Undead (Strider Nolan, 2000), written under the pen name of Shane MacDougall; Vampire Universe: The Dark World of Supernatural Beings That Haunt Us, Hunt Us and Hunger for Us (Citadel Press, 2006); The Cryptopedia, co-authored by David F. Kramer (2007); Zombie CSU: The Forensics of the Living Dead (2008); They Bite (also with David F. Kramer, 2009); and Wanted Undead or Alive (with Janice Gable Bashman, 2010). The Cryptopedia won the Bram Stoker Award for Best Non-Fiction.

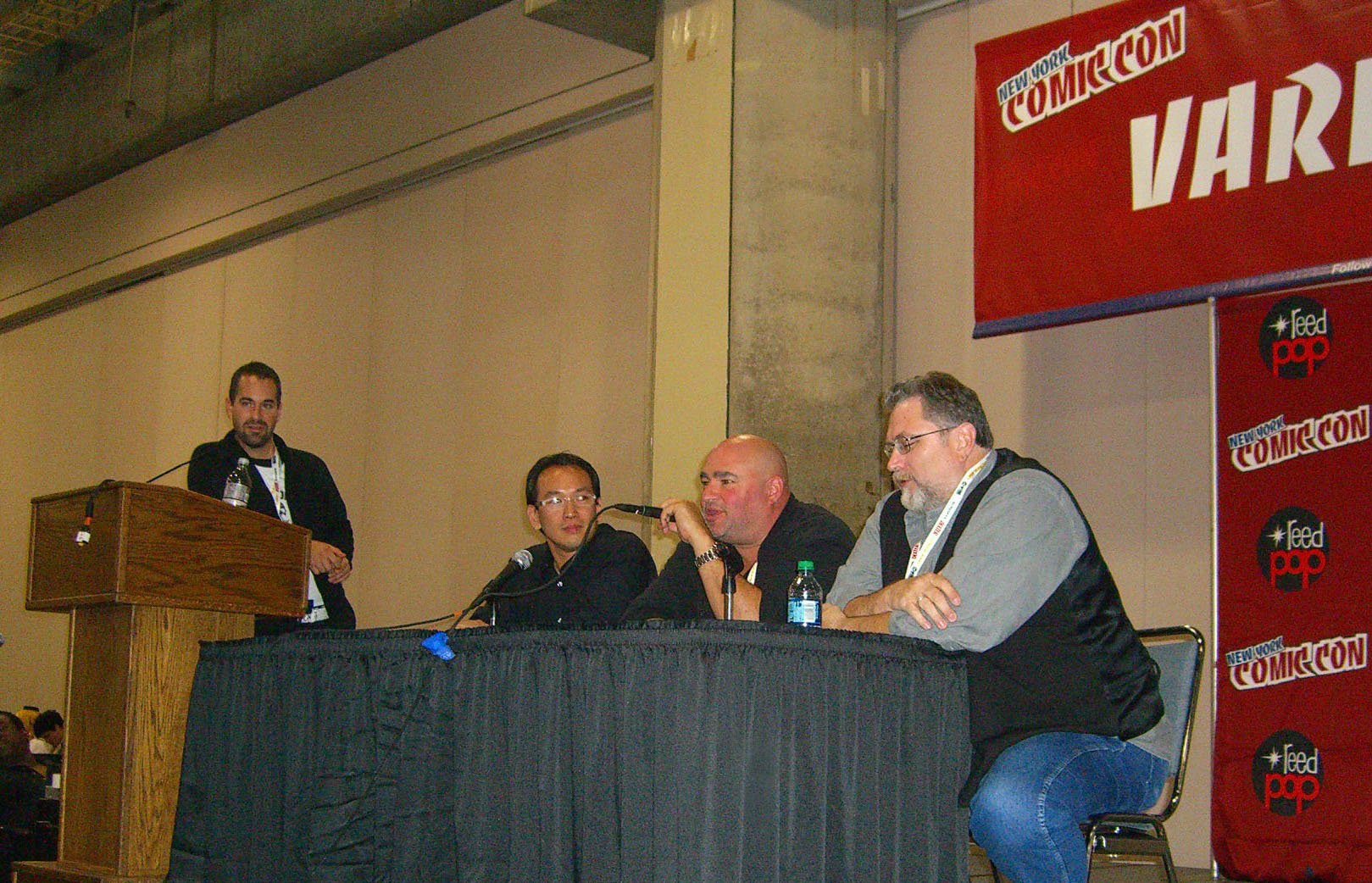
Maberry (right) at the 2012 New York Comic Con

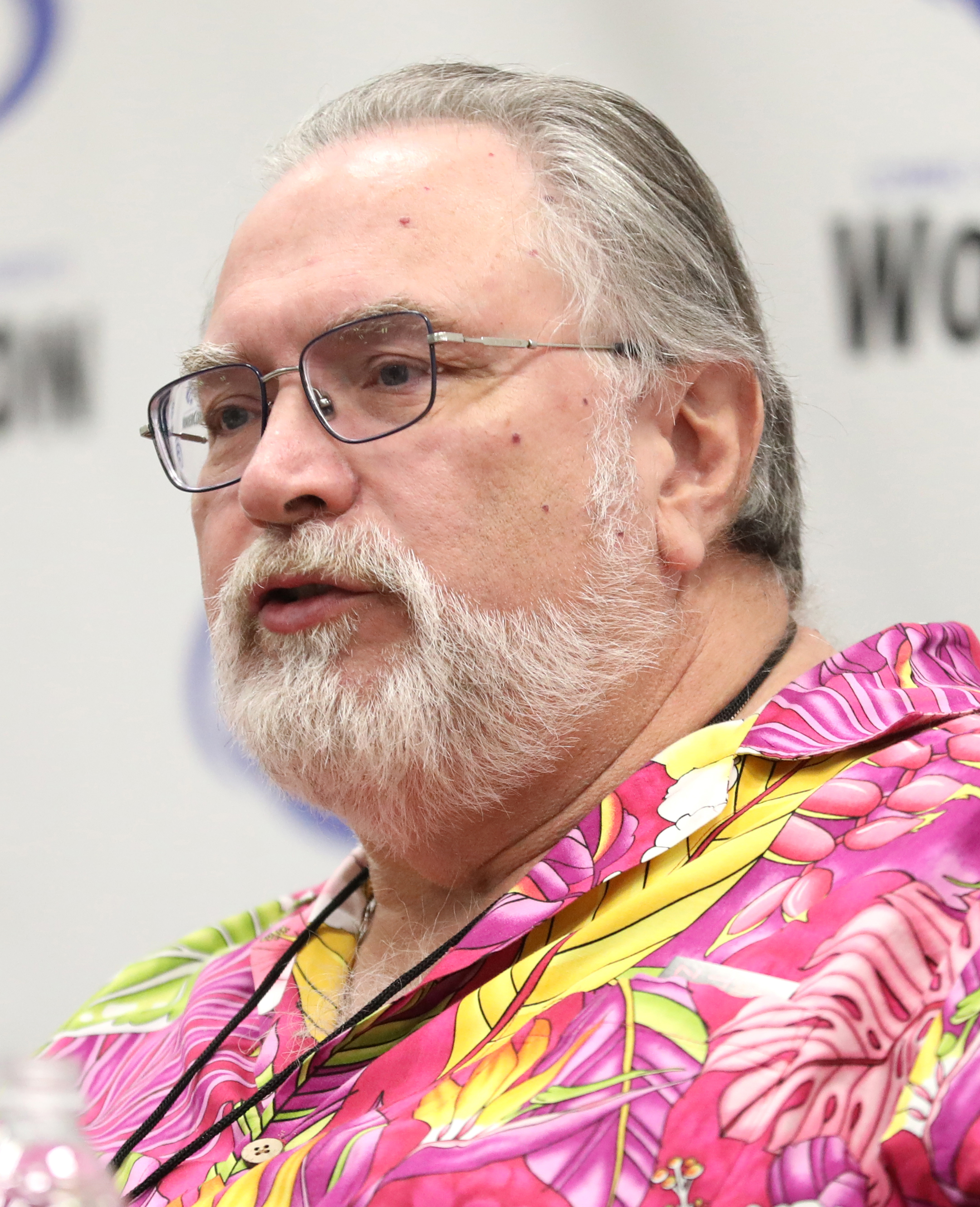
Maberry at the 2024 WonderCon

His first novel, Ghost Road Blues, won the 2007 Bram Stoker Award for Best First Novel. That book was the first of the Pine Deep Trilogy and was followed by Dead Man's Song (2007) and Bad Moon Rising (2008), all from Pinnacle Books.

Maberry is also a freelance comic book writer, first for Marvel and later for Dark Horse and IDW Publishing. His first story, "Wolverine: Ghosts", was published as a backup story in Wolverine: Anniversary, April 2009. In August 2009 he became the regular writer for Marvel's Black Panther series, starting on the 7th issue, and he wrote Marvel Zombies Return: Wolverine. In 2010, he wrote Doom War and Marvel Universe Vs The Punisher, Marvel Universe Vs Wolverine, Marvel Universe Vs The Avengers; Klaws of the Panther, and Captain America: Hail Hydra. He moved to Dark Horse Comics and produced a single miniseries, Bad Blood, with artist Tyler Crook, which went on to win the Bram Stoker Award for Best Graphic Novel. His work for IDW Publishing includes two collections of V-Wars, a five-issue standalone series Rot & Ruin: Warrior Smart, and his latest series Pandemic.

His bestselling work was the novelization of the 2010 film The Wolfman which starred Benicio del Toro, Anthony Hopkins, Emily Blunt, and Hugo Weaving. In March 2010, the novel reached No. 35 on the mass-market paperback section of The New York Times Best Seller List. It was nominated for and won the Scribe Award for Best Film Adaptation, issued by the International Association of Media Tie-in Writers.

In 2010, Maberry began writing young adult post-apocalyptic zombie stories. His first prestigious award was for his first young adult novel, Rot & Ruin (2010, Simon & Schuster). It won the 2010 Bram Stoker Award for Best Novel, was named in Booklist's Ten Best Horror Novels for Young Adults, an American Library Association Top Pick, a Bram Stoker and Pennsylvania Keystone to Reading winner; winner of several state Teen Book Awards including the Cricket, Nutmeg and MASL; winner of the Cybils Award, the Eva Perry Mock Printz medal, Dead Letter Best Novel Award, and four Melinda Awards. It became the first of a new series of post-apocalyptic zombie thrillers such as Dust & Decay (winner of a 2011 Bram Stoker Award) Flesh & Bone (winner of a 2012 Bram Stoker Award), Fire & Ash, a collection of short stories, Bits and Pieces, Broken Lands, and Lost Roads, which was released on August 25, 2020.

Maberry then launched a series called The Nightsiders that blends science fiction with horror. Book 1 of that series, The Orphan Army was named as one of the 100 Best Books for Children. A follow-up, Vault of Shadows was published in August 2016.

The series for which Maberry is best known is the Joe Ledger Series, in which a Baltimore police detective is recruited into a Special Ops unit attached to the mysterious Department of Military Sciences, which is run by enigmatic Mr. Church. Each of the books in the series pits Ledger and his team against a different kind of extreme science threat. In the first novel, Patient Zero, the threat is a pathogen that turns people into zombies. In the second book, The Dragon Factory, the villains are geneticists using cutting-edge science to restart the Nazi master race eugenics program. The rest of the series follows with The King of Plagues, Assassin's Code, Extinction Machine, Code Zero, Predator One, Kill Switch, Dogs of War; and Deep Silence. Maberry recently launched Rage, the first in the follow-up Rogue Team International series, also featuring Joe Ledger. A collection of Maberry's Joe Ledger short stories, Joe Ledger: Special Ops, was released by JournalStone. The series' main publisher, Griffin, released Joe Ledger: Unstoppable, an anthology of Ledger stories written by a variety of top suspense and mystery writers including Tim Lebbon, Scott Sigler, Steve Alten, Weston Ochse, Dana Fredsti, Christopher Golden, Joe McKinney, Jeremy Robinson, Javier Grillo-Marxuach, Sherrilyn Kenyon, Bryan Thomas-Schmidt, and others.

In 2015, Maberry released a rare standalone novel, Ghostwalkers, based on the Deadlands table top role playing game. The book was nominated for a Scribe Award for best original novel based on a licensed property.

His most recent standalone novel was Glimpse, published in March 2018 by St. Martin's Press. Glimpse is a chilling thriller that explores what happens when reality and nightmares converge, and how far one will go to protect the innocent when their own brain is a threat. Another standalone, Ink, will be released by St. Martin's Griffin as a trade paperback in 2020. Although a standalone, Ink has elements of other books, including characters and locations from the Pine Deep Trilogy, and the appearance of Monk Addison and Patty Cakes from Glimpse.

Maberry is also a prolific editor of anthologies in a variety of genre including dark fantasy (Out of Tune and Out of Tune Vol 2), science fiction/horror (The X-Files: Trust No One, The X-Files: The Truth is Out There, and The X-Files: Secret Agendas, all from IDW Publishing); horror (Nights of the Living Dead, with George A. Romero); mystery pastiche (Alternate Sherlocks, with Michael Ventrella), political thrillers with horror (V-wars, V-Wars: Blood and Fire, V-Wars: Night Terrors, and V-Wars: Shockwaves), and an anthology of horror stories for teens (Scary Out There) which features original stories and poetry by R.L. Stine, Ellen Hopkins, Linda Addision, Ilsa J. Bick, and many others.

In 2017, he published Devil's Advocate, one of the first two books in the X-Files Origins series. Maberry wrote the story about a young Dana Scully, while colleague Kami Garcia (Beautiful Creatures), wrote Agent of Chaos, a young Fox Mulder story.

Also in 2017, Maberry published Indigo, a collaborative work of fiction written with nine other authors including Charlaine Harris and Christopher Golden.

=== Film and television ===
In May 2010, Maberry's work was the basis of a television pilot written by Javier Grillo-Marxuach named "Department Zero", which was moved into active production by ABC Television.

In April 2018, it was announced that Netflix greenlit a television adaptation of the V-WARS novels and comics. Following the series announcement, it was confirmed that Maberry would be credited as an executive producer and creator for the Netflix series V Wars. Production for the first season began and ended in 2018 for a 10-episode first season. The series premiered on December 5, 2019.

=== Other work ===
Maberry is a speaker for the National Writers Union, a writing mentor for the Horror Writers Association and the Mystery Writers of America, a member of the International Thriller Writers and president of the NJ-PA Chapter of the Horror Writers Association.

Maberry is also a contributing editor for The Big Thrill, the monthly newsletter of the International Thriller Writers, and a founding partner of The Liars Club, a networking group of professionals in publishing and other aspects of entertainment.

== Personal life ==
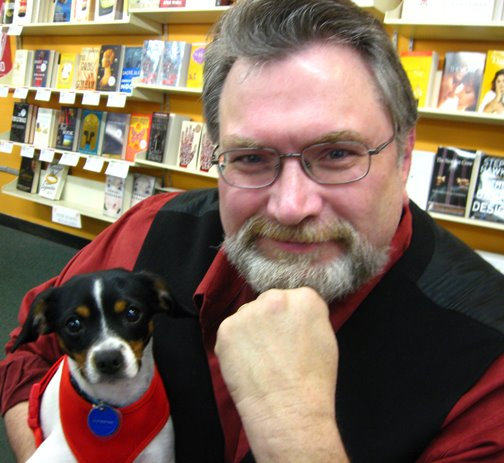
Jonathan Maberry and his dog Rosie in 2012

Maberry holds an 8th degree black belt in Shinowara-ryu Jujutsu. In 2004 he was inducted into the Martial Arts Hall of Fame.

== Awards ==
Maberry has won or been nominated for 17 Bram Stoker Awards between 2006 & 2021 in a variety of categories.

Work	Year & Award	Category	Result	Ref.
Ghost Road Blues	2006 Bram Stoker Award	First Novel	Won	
Ghost Road Blues	2006 Bram Stoker Award	Novel	Nominated	
The Cryptopedia: A Dictionary of the Weird, Strange & Downright Bizarre (with David F. Kramer)	2007 Bram Stoker Award	Non-Fiction	Won	
Zombie CSU	2008 Bram Stoker Award	Non-Fiction	Nominated	
Zombie CSU	2008 Black Quill Award	Dark Genre Book of Non-Fiction (Readers' Choice)	Won	
Joe Ledger: Patient Zero	2009 Bram Stoker Award	Novel	Nominated	
Wanted Undead or Alive: Vampire Hunters and Other Kick-Ass Enemies of Evil (with Janice Gable Bashman)	2010 Bram Stoker Award	Non-Fiction	Nominated	
Rot & Ruin	2010 Bram Stoker Award	Novel	Nominated	
Rot & Ruin	2010 Cybils Award	Young Adult	Won	
Rot & Ruin	2012-2013 South Dakota Library Association	SD Teen Choice Book Awards	MS Honor	
Rot & Ruin	2014 Utah Beehive Book Award	Young Adult	Nominated	
Joe Ledger #3: The King of Plagues	2011 Goodreads Choice Awards	Horror	Nominated	
Dust and Decay	2011 Bram Stoker Award	Young Adult Novel	Won	
Dust and Decay	2013 Westchester Fiction Award		Won	
Marvel Universe vs. Wolverine	2011 Bram Stoker Award	Graphic Novel	Nominated	
The Wolfman	2011 Scribe Award	Adapted Novel	Won	
Joe Ledger #4: Assassin's Code	2012 Goodreads Choice Awards	Horror	Nominated	
Flesh and Bone	2012 Bram Stoker Award	Young Adult Novel	Won	
Bad Blood (with Tyler Crook)	2014 Bram Stoker Award	Graphic Novel	Won	
Joe Ledger #5: Extinction Machine	2013 Goodreads Choice Awards	Horror	Nominated	
Joe Ledger #5: Extinction Machine	2014 Audie Awards	Science Fiction	Nominated	
Three Guys Walk into a Bar	2014 Bram Stoker Award	Long Fiction	Nominated	
Joe Ledger #6: Code Zero	2014 Goodreads Choice Awards	Horror	Nominated	
X-Files: Trust No One	2015 Bram Stoker Award	Anthology	Nominated	
Ghostwalkers	2016 Dragon Awards	Alternate History Novel	Nominated	
Ghostwalkers	2016 Scribe Awards	Original Novel - Speculative	Nominated	
Joe Ledger #8: Kill Switch	2016 Goodreads Choice Awards	Horror	Nominated	
Nights of the Living Dead (with George A. Romero)	2017 Bram Stoker Award	Anthology	Nominated	
	2017 Inkpot Award		Won	
Broken Lands	2018 Bram Stoker Award	Young Adult Novel	Nominated	
Banana Republic	2018 Scribe Award	Short Story	Won	
X-Files Origins: Devil's Advocate	2018 Scribe Award	YA Original	Won	
Glimpse	2018 Bram Stoker Award	Novel	Nominated	
Glimpse	2018 Dragon Awards	Horror Novel	Nominated	
Empty Graves: Tales of the Living Dead	2021 Bram Stoker Award	Fiction Collection	Nominated	
Diablo "The Toll of Darkness and Light"	2024 Scribe Awards	Short Story	Nominated	
Joe Ledger/Rogue Team International: Cave 13	2024 ITW Awards	Paperback Original Novel	Nominated	
Body of work	2025 Bram Stoker Awards	Lifetime Achievement	Won	

- 2003, Writer's Award, International Martial Arts Hall of Fame
- 2004, Martial Arts Hall of Fame (USA)

== Bibliography ==
=== Stand-alone novels ===
- The Wolfman (2010, Tor Books) – ISBN 978-0765365163
- Deadlands: Ghostwalkers (October 2010, Tor Books)
- Mars One (2016, Simon & Schuster)
- Indigo (2017, St. Martin's Press) – ISBN 978-1250076786
- Glimpse (2018, St. Martin's Griffin) – ISBN 978-1250209535

=== Night Universe ===
==== Pine Deep Trilogy ====
- Ghost Road Blues (June 2006, Pinnacle Books) – ISBN 978-1496705396
- Dead Man's Song (July 2007, Pinnacle Books) – ISBN 978-1441792136
- Bad Moon Rising (May 2008, Pinnacle Books) – ISBN 978-1496705419
- Monk Addison:
  - Ink (2020, St. Martin's Griffin) – ISBN 978-1250765888

==== Rot & Ruin series ====
- Rot & Ruin (September 2010, Simon & Schuster)
- Dust & Decay (August 2011, Simon & Schuster
- Flesh & Bone (September 2012, Simon & Schuster
- Fire & Ash (September 2013, Simon & Schuster) (finale)
- Bits & Pieces (September 2015, Simon & Schuster) (short story collection)
- Broken Lands series:
  - Broken Lands – Broken Lands #1/Rot & Ruin #6 (December 2018, Simon & Schuster)
  - Lost Roads – Broken Lands #2/Rot & Ruin #7 (August 2020, Simon & Schuster)

==== Joe Ledger series ====
- Patient Zero (March 2009, St. Martin's Griffin)
- The Dragon Factory (March 2010, St. Martin's Griffin)
- The King of Plagues (March 2011, St. Martin's Griffin)
- Assassin's Code (April 2012, St. Martin's Griffin)
- The Extinction Machine (March 2013, St. Martin's Griffin)
- Code Zero (March 2014, St. Martin's Griffin)
- Predator One (March 2015, St. Martin's Griffin)
- Kill Switch (April 2016, St. Martin's Griffin)
- Dogs of War (2017, St. Martin's Griffin)
- Deep Silence (October 2018, St. Martin's Griffin)
- Joe Ledger – Rogue Team International
  - Rage (November 2019, St. Martin's Griffin)
  - Relentless (July 2021, St. Martin's Griffin)
  - Cave 13 (August 2023, St. Martin's Griffin) ISBN 9781250619327, 9781250899200, 9781250619334
  - Burn to Shine (March 2025, St. Martin's Griffin)

==== Dead of Night series ====
- Dead of Night (2011, St. Martin's Griffin) – ISBN 978-0312552190
- Fall of Night (2014, St. Martin's Griffin) – ISBN 978-1250034946
- Dark of Night (2016, JournalStone) (novella)
- Still of Night (2018, JournalStone) – ISBN 978-1947654341

=== The Nightsiders ===
- The Nightsiders: The Orphan Army (2015, Simon & Schuster Books for Young Readers)
- The Nightsiders: Vault of Shadows (2016, Simon & Schuster Books for Young Readers)

=== X-Files Origins ===
- Devil's Advocate (2017, Imprint/Macmillan)

=== Kagen the Damned ===
- Kagen the Damned (May 2022, St. Martin's Griffin) – ISBN 978-1250783974
- "I Say Your Name in the Dark Nights" (short story) (November 2022, St. Martin's Griffin) – ISBN 9781250887658
- Son of the Poison Rose (January 2023, St. Martin's Griffin) – ISBN 9781250783998

=== Anthologies and collections ===
==== V-Wars: Chronicles of the Vampire Wars ====
- V-Wars (editor and principal writer – 2012, IDW Publishing)
- V-Wars: Blood and Fire (editor and principal writer – 2014, IDW Publishing)
- V-Wars: Night Terrors (editor and principal writer – 2016, IDW Publishing)
- V-Wars: Shockwaves (editor and principal writer – 2016, IDW Publishing)

==== Others ====
Anthology or Collection	Contents	Publication Date	Publisher	Comments
Joe Ledger: The Missing Files	Countdown Zero Tolerance Deep, Dark Material Witness Dog Days	2011	Blackstone	audio collection
Tales from the Fire Zone	Like Part of the Family Doctor Nine Property Condemned Adventure of the Greenbrier Ghost Cooked	2012	Blackstone	audio collection
An Apple for the Creature	Spellcaster 2.0	2012	Ace Penguin Group Jo Fletcher Books Wheeler Publishing Brilliance Audio	
21st Century Dead A Zombie Anthology	Jack and Jill	2012	St. Martin's	
Hungry Tales	Calling Death Chokepoint Pegleg and Paddy Save the World The Wind through the Fence	2013	Blackstone	audio collection
Joe Ledger: Special Ops	Countdown Zero Tolerance Deep, Dark Material Witness Changeling Mad Science Artifact The Handyman Gets Out Borrowed Power Inside the DMS Interview with Ray Porter	2014	JournalStone	short story collection
Darkness on the Edge of Town: Pine Deep Stories	Long Way Home Mister Pockets Property Condemned Whistlin' Past the Graveyard The Trouble	2015	Blackstone	audio collection
Strange Worlds	The Things That Live in Cages The Death Song of Dwar Guntha Plan 7 From Sin City Clean Sweeps The Vanishing Assassin	2015	Blackstone	audio collection
Whistling Past the Graveyard	Doctor Nine The Adventure of the Greenbrier Ghost Calling Death Flint and Steel The Death Song of Dwar Guntha Chokepoint Clean Sweeps Long Way Home Mister Pockets Property Condemned Whistlin' Past the Graveyard Cooked The Death Poem of Sensei Ōtoro Ink	2016	JournalStone	
Red Dreams and Other Stories	Red Dreams	2016	JournalStone	
Joe Ledger: Unstoppable	Introduction Atoll	2017		
Beneath the Skin: The Case Files of Sam Hunter		2017	JournalStone Blackstone	short story collection audio collection
A Wind Through the Fence	Pegleg and Paddy Save the World Plan 7 from Sin City. Red Dreams Saint John Spellcaster 2.0 She's Got a Ticket to Ride The Cobbler of Oz The Things That Live in Cages The Vanishing Assassin The Wind through the Fence Faces	2017	JournalStone	
A Little Bronze Book of Cautionary Tales	Ink Fat Girl With a Knife Jingo and the Hammerman Son of the Devil	2017	Borderlands Press	
Empty Graves		2021	WordFire Press	
Joe Ledger: Secret Missions Vol. 1		2021	Journalstone	
Joe Ledger: Secret Missions Vol. 2		2021	Journalstone	
Midnight Lullabies: Unquiet Stories and Poems	The Door Between Us ° A Small Taste of the Old Country ° Being Emily-Claire ° Calling Death ° Cooked ° Gavin Funke's Monster Movie Marathon ° Doctor Nine ° Lullaby ° The Things That Live in Cages ° Invasive Species ° Monk ° Road Beers with Norm and Tank at Twitchy's ° Saint John ° Son of the Devil ° The Scream ° When You See Millions of the Mouthless Dead Across Your Dreams in Pale Battalions Go	Sept. 2024	WordFire Press	Contains a Foreword by Joe R. Lansdale

=== Anthology editor ===
- Out of Tune Vol 1 (2014, JournalStone Publishing)
- Out of Tune Vol 2 (2016, JournalStone Publishing)
- X-Files: Trust No One (2015, IDW Publishing)
- X-Files: The Truth is Out There (2016, IDW Publishing)
- X-Files: Secret Agenda (2016, IDW Publishing)
- Scary Out There (2016, Simon & Schuster)
- Joe Ledger: Unstoppable (2017, Simon & Schuster) (with Bryan Thomas-Schmidt)
- Baker Street Irregulars (2017, Diversion Books) (with Michael Ventrella)
- Nights of the Living Dead (2017, St. Martin's Griffin) (with George A. Romero)
- Hardboiled Horror (2017, JournalStone Publishing)
- The Baker Street Irregulars: The Game's Afoot (2018, Diversion Books) (with Michael Ventrella)
- Aliens: Bug Hunt (2018, Titan Books)
- New Scary Stories to Tell in the Dark (2019, HarperCollins)
- Don't Turn Out the Lights (2020, HarperCollins)
- Aliens vs Predator: Ultimate Prey (2022, Titan Books)

=== Nonfiction ===
- Judo and You: A Handbook for the Serious Student (1991, Kendall Hunt) – ISBN 0-8403-6664-7
- Self-Defense for Every Woman (1992, Vortex Multimedia)
- Shinowara-ryo Jujutsu: A History (1993, Vortex Multimedia)
- Introduction to Asian Martial Arts (1993, Vortex Multimedia)
- Shinowara-ryo Jujutsu: Student Handbook (1994, Vortex Multimedia)
- The Martial Arts Student Log Book (October 2002)
- Ultimate Jujutsu: Principles and Practices (October 2002)
- Ultimate Sparring: Principles & Practices (January 2003)
- The Vampire Slayers' Field Guide to the Undead (2003, Strider Nolan Publishing) (as Shane MacDougall) – ISBN 1-932045-13-9
- Vampire Universe: The Dark World of Supernatural Beings That Haunt Us, Hunt Us and Hunger for Us (September 2006)
- The Cryptopedia: A Dictionary of the Weird, Strange, and Downright Bizarre (September 2007) (with David F. Kramer)
- Zombie CSU: The Forensics of the Living Dead (September 2008)
- THEY BITE!: Endless Cravings of Supernatural Predators (August 2008)
- Wanted Undead or Alive: Vampire Hunters and Other Kick-Ass Enemies of Evil (September 2010) (with Janice Gable Bashman)
- The Joe Ledger Companion (2017, JournalStone) (with Dana Fredsti & Mari Adkins)

=== Comics ===
- Marvel Universe vs. The Punisher (with Goran Parlov, 4-issue limited series, Marvel Comics, October–November 2010, tpb, 112 pages, hardcover, January 2011, ISBN 0-7851-4355-6, softcover, June 2011, ISBN 0-7851-4595-8)
- Marvel Universe vs. Wolverine (with Laurence Campbell, 4-issue limited series, Marvel Comics, June–August 2011, tpb, 112 pages, hardcover, November 2011, ISBN 0-7851-5692-5, softcover, May 2012, ISBN 0-7851-5653-4)
- Marvel Universe vs. The Avengers (with Leandro Fernández, 4-issue limited series, Marvel Comics, December 2012 – March 2013, tpb, 96 pages, softcover, April 2013, ISBN 0-7851-6616-5)
- Rot & Ruin (with Tony Vargas and Alex Roland, continuing series, IDW Publishing, September 2014 – Current)
- Captain America: Hail Hydra (Marvel Entertainment, 2011)
- Klaws of the Panther (Marvel Entertainment, 2011)
- Black Panther: DoomWar (Marvel Entertainment, 2009)
- Black Panther: Power (Marvel Comics, 2009)
- Marvel Zombies Return, Issue 3 (Marvel Comics, 2009)
- Punisher: Naked Kills (Marvel Comics, 2008)
- Black Panther: Age of Heroes (Marvel Comics, 2011)
- Wolverine: Flies to a Spider (Marvel Comics, 2009)
- Bad Blood Dark Horse Comics, 2014)
- V-Wars: Crimson Queen (IDW Publishing, 2014)
- V-Wars: All of Us Monsters (IDW Publishing, 2015)
- V-Wars: Gods of Death (IDW Publishing, 2019)
- V-Wars: The Complete Collection (IDW Publishing, 2019)
- Road of the Dead: Highway to Hell, Issues 1-3 (IDW Publishing, 2018–2019)
- Road of the Dead: Highway to Hell, Graphic Novel, ISBN 978-1-68405-478-7 (IDW Publishing, 2019)
- Pandemica, Issues 1-3 (IDW Publishing, 2019)
- Pandemica, Graphic Novel Collection (IDW Publishing, June 2020)

=== Audiobooks ===
- Lullaby, Narrated by Scott Brick, Audible Original, (Audible Studios 2018)
- Bewilderness, Part One: Threshold, Narrated by Shayna Small, Audible Original, (Audible Studios December 2020)
- Bewilderness, Part Two: What Rough Beast, Narrated by Shayna Small, Audible Original, (Audible Studios January 2021)
- Bewilderness, Part Three: Destroyer of Worlds, Narrated by Shayna Small, Audible Original, (Audible Studios February 2021)
