= Going the Distance (2010 film) =

- Theatrical release poster
- Directed by: Nanette Burstein
- Written by: Geoff LaTulippe
- Produced by: Adam Shankman; Jennifer Gibgot; Garrett Grant
- Starring: Drew Barrymore; Justin Long; Charlie Day; Jason Sudeikis; Christina Applegate
- Cinematography: Eric Steelberg
- Edited by: Peter Teschner
- Music by: Mychael Danna
- Production companies: New Line Cinema; Offspring Entertainment
- Distributed by: Warner Bros. Pictures
- Release dates: August 27, 2010 (United Kingdom); September 3, 2010 (United States)
- Running time: 102 minutes
- Country: United States
- Language: English
- Budget: $32 million
- Box office: $42.1 million

Going the Distance is a 2010 American romantic comedy film directed by Nanette Burstein, written by Geoff LaTulippe, and starring Drew Barrymore and Justin Long.

The plot follows Erin and Garrett, a young couple who fall in love one summer in New York City and try to keep their long-distance relationship alive when she moves back home to San Francisco.

Going the Distance was released by Warner Bros. Pictures in the United Kingdom on August 27, 2010 and in the United States on September 3, 2010. The film received mixed reviews from critics and grossed $42.1 million against a $32 million budget.

== Plot ==
Erin Langford is a graduate journalism student, recently hired as a summer intern at a New York City newspaper. Out with a friend at a bar, she meets Garrett, who interrupts her game of Centipede. They drink together and end up at his place, where they smoke marijuana and have sex while Garrett's roommate Dan "DJs their hook up". The next morning, before she can leave, Erin agrees to have breakfast with him. Telling him she is only in the city for six weeks, they agree to keep it casual.

Erin and Garrett soon develop feelings for each other, and she tries to get a permanent position at the paper. Before the end of her internship, she writes a well-received article and is told to contact them in January regarding possible job openings. Working for a record label, Garrett is assigned to manage a band he dislikes, and he begins to hate his job.

When Erin's six weeks are over, she and Garrett find it difficult to let go. After driving her to the airport and saying goodbye, Garrett runs after her. Admitting that he is crazy about her and wants to have a long-distance relationship, she agrees.

Over the following months, Erin and Garrett spend their free time trying to figure out when they can see each other. He gives her a surprise visit on Thanksgiving. After an emotional reunion, they go to Erin's sister Corinne's house, where she is staying, and start to have passionate sex on the dining room table.

Unbeknownst to them, Erin's brother-in-law Phil is having dinner at the table in the dark, and Corinne walks in on the awkward scene. The next day, they see The Boxer Rebellion perform. Garrett is jealous Erin is friends with Damon, a handsome bartender, and eventually has to return to NYC.

In January, Erin calls her former boss, but they are not hiring. Unable to find comfort in a phone conversation with Garrett, she gets drunk with Damon and almost kisses him, but goes home. Her professor recommends her for a position at the San Francisco Chronicle and she goes for an interview. Garrett tries to have phone sex with Erin, but it ends up being awkward, leaving both feeling ridiculous.

A month later, while Erin is packing for a weekend in NYC, she gets a call from the Chronicle and is offered the job. Upon arriving in New York, she tells Garrett about the job offer, blindsiding him with the news. Their happy reunion quickly devolves into a fight, causing Erin to spend the first night of her trip at a friend's.

They make up the next day, and Garrett calls Erin a week later saying he wants her to move to NYC, live together and start afresh. She agrees, but while visiting San Francisco to sort things out, a conversation with Corinne makes Garrett realize he should not be the reason Erin turns down the job. So, they part ways after an emotional conversation and a long hug at the airport.

Six months later, Erin's career is going well, having written her first front-page story. Garrett has not been with anyone since her, and quits his job to manage The Boxer Rebellion. He sends Erin tickets to their show and she goes, unaware he is the band manager.

At the concert he reveals he has moved to Los Angeles, only several hours from San Francisco, and they seize another chance at a relationship. Late that night they go back to Corinne's, interrupting her and Phil dry humping on the dining room table. The film ends as Corinne & Phil's daughter and Erin's niece, Maya, enters during the awkward moment, and they all scream "Maya! Statue!" at her to freeze.

== Cast ==
- Drew Barrymore as Erin Rankin Langford
- Justin Long as Garrett Scully
- Charlie Day as Dan Grant
- Jason Sudeikis as Box Saunders
- Christina Applegate as Corinne Berlin
- Kelli Garner as Brianna Jutsum
- Natalie Morales as Brandy
- June Diane Raphael as Karen Surgeoner
- Ron Livingston as Will Broderick
- Rob Riggle as Ron Surgeoner
- Leighton Meester as Amy
- Jim Gaffigan as Phil Berlin
- Kristen Schaal as Female Bartender
- Sarah Burns as Harper
- Matt Servitto as Hugh O'Keefe
- Maria Di Angelis as Receptionist
- Meredith Hagner as Tanning salon employee
- Oliver Jackson-Cohen as Damon
- Mick Hazen as Zeff
- Mike Birbiglia as Waiter

== Soundtrack ==
1. Generationals: "Either Way"
2. Georgie James: "Places"
3. Katie Herzig: "Hey Na Na"
4. Albert Hammond Jr.: "In Transit"
5. The Cure: "Just Like Heaven"
6. The Pretenders: "Don't Get Me Wrong"
7. The Boxer Rebellion: "Spitting Fire"
8. Cat Power: "Could We"
9. Band of Skulls: "Cold Fame"
10. Eels: "Prizefighter"
11. Passion Pit: "The Reeling" (Groove Police Remix)
12. Fanfarlo: "Harold T. Wilkins, or How to Wait for a Very Long Time"
13. The Replacements: "Here Comes a Regular"
14. The Boxer Rebellion: "If You Run"
15. Gotye: "Learnalilgivinanlovin"
16. The Airborne Toxic Event: "Half of Something Else"

Three additional songs can be accessed through a link on the CD and on the digital deluxe version:

1. The Boxer Rebellion – "Evacuate"
2. Joe Purdy – "Miss Me"
3. Edward Sharpe and the Magnetic Zeros – "40 Day Dream"

== Release ==
Initially, the film was to be released domestically on August 27, 2010, amid weak reviews, but Warner Bros. decided to push back its release date one week to September 3, to open on Labor Day weekend. Dan Fellman, Warner Bros. Domestic Distribution President, said: "Moving to the Labor Day weekend not only allows us to take advantage of the long holiday weekend, but gives us some distance from the other female-driven films releasing in August." Eventually, Going the Distance′s earliest release was on September 2, 2010, in eight countries including Australia, Argentina and Germany, one day before its North American release.

=== Box office ===
The film opened in 3,030 theaters in the United States and Canada on September 3, 2010, and grossed $6,884,964 in its opening weekend, ranking 5th at the box office behind The American, Machete, Takers and The Last Exorcism. It eventually grossed $17,804,299 in North America, ranking 120th domestically for 2010. In foreign markets it grossed $24,248,458, for a worldwide box office total of $42,052,757, making it the 118th highest-grossing film of 2010.

=== Critical response ===
On Rotten Tomatoes, the film holds an approval rating of 54% based on 166 reviews, with an average rating of 5.75/10. The site's critical consensus states: "It's timelier and a little more honest than most romantic comedies, but Drew Barrymore and Justin Long's screen chemistry doesn't make up for Going the Distance's overall flatness and convoluted story." On Metacritic, the film holds a weighted average score of 51 out of 100, based on 31 critics, indicating "mixed or average" reviews. Audiences polled by CinemaScore gave the film an average grade of "B" on an A+ to F scale.

USA Today′s Claudia Puig wrote, "This premise, with better writing, could have made a much more compelling movie.

A. O. Scott of The New York Times said the film "acknowledges both the difficulty and the comic potential of the arrangement, and does so with enough insight and charm to make you wonder why frequent-flier love is not a more popular theme in romantic comedies", while Michael O'Sullivan of The Washington Post described it as "filthy, funny and kind of sweet". Tom Long of The Detroit News stated that the film's "constant raunch factor balances out its romantic center in a way that will likely surprise and please many", and Mick LaSalle of the San Francisco Chronicle that it "captures the harshness and the sweetness of our time". Carrie Rickey of The Philadelphia Inquirer said "the film gets many things so right about the conflicts faced by a two-career couple looking for work in a shrinking economy", and Owen Gleiberman of Entertainment Weekly that the film is "the rare romantic comedy in which you can actually believe what you're seeing". Linda Barnard, film critic for Toronto Star, said that the film "is a reminder of the sorry state of the rom-com, where gross scenes and easy-to-write trash talk have replaced smart dialogue". Michael Phillips of the Chicago Tribune stated that "Geoff LaTulippe's story of a recession-era long-distance relationship and its hurdles takes its characters seriously", also praising Barrymore's performance, for whom The Boston Globe's film critic Wesley Morris said that "is becoming a serious comedic actor".

Justin Chang of Variety describes the film as "a bicoastal comedy with a bit of a bipolar disorder", while Kirk Honeycutt of The Hollywood Reporter panned the film and screenwriting implying that it is a "romantic comedy [which is] going wrong in so many different ways". Peter Travers, writing for Rolling Stone, concluded that "Barrymore and Long are both appealing, but not enough to sustain audience interest in the cinematic equivalent of dry-humping".
