= Dead of Night (novel series) =

Novel series by Jonathan Maberry and Rachael Lavin

Dead of Night is a series of zombie apocalypse novels by best-selling horror author Jonathan Maberry and Rachael Lavin. The series is set in Pennsylvania in fictional Stebbins County, featuring characters from Maberry's Joe Ledger book series, effectively serving as a sequel series to the latter.

== Books ==
- Dead of Night (2011)
- Fall of Night (2014)
- Dark of Night (2016)
- Still of Night (2018)

== Characters ==
- Herman Volker: Soviet defector, former scientist. Designs Lucifer 113 to punish serial killers - to force them to remain conscious in the grave while their body rots.
- Homer Gibbon: Serial killer who Dr. Volker infects with Lucifer-113. Instead of being buried immediately at the prison, his Aunt has his body brought to Stebbins for burial. Unlike other zombies, Gibbon retains control of his body and purposefully leaves the quarantine zone to spread the infection.
- Lee Hartnup: Funeral home director and first victim of Gibbon.
- Desdemona Fox: Police officer in Stebbins with military training who is primarily responsible for keeping the zombies from immediately overrunning the kids at the middle school. In Fall of Night, she leads the survivors at the middle school and with the help of Sam Imura, gets them out of Stebbins and on the road to Ashville. In Dark of Night, she meets Joe Ledger, and with him, eliminates a group of men who are worse than zombies.
- Bill Trout: Local Stebbins reporter who covers the story of Homer Gibbon and the outbreak. He obtains all of Dr. Volker's research notes and then makes it to the middle school where his reporting prevents the school from being fire bombed.
- Gregory "Goat" Weinman: cameraman partner to Billy Trout. After fleeing to Borderton, he is captured by Homer Gibbon and accompanies Gibbon to report on Gibbon's story.
- JT Hammond: Stebbins' Sheriff who is a father figure to Desdemona Fox. He dies at the end of Dead of Night when he takes the infected out of the middle school and reveals that he also has been bitten.
- Scott Blair: National Security Advisor who advises aggressive and lethal force from the beginning of the outbreak but is overruled by the President.
- General Simeon Zetter: Replaces Colonel Dietrich after Trout's broadcast. He strikes a deal with Fox and Trout to save the children at the middle school if they send out the infected from the school. Zetter then assures the President the outbreak is contained. In Fall of Night, Zetter discovers the outbreak is outside the quarantine zone and orders fire bombing of surrounding counties that aerosolizes the parasite larvae and leads to his own infection and subsequent death.
- Sam Imura: Former sniper for Department of Military Sciences. Is sent to Stebbins to recover the flash drives and report on whether the outbreak is contained. He then accompanies Fox and Trout to help the children escape the remaining zombies in Stebbins County.
