= Rachel Harrison (writer) =

American author of horror fiction

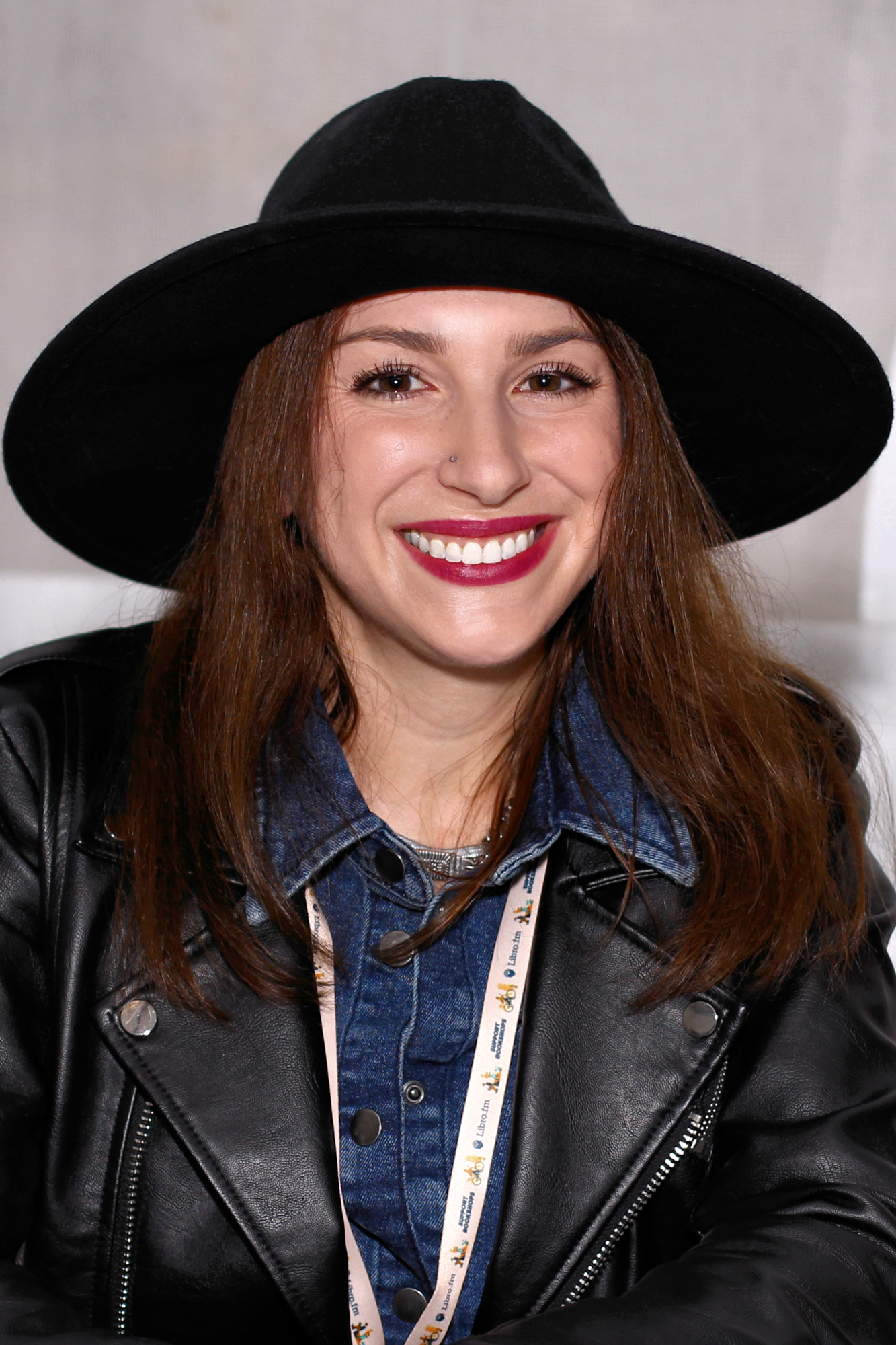
Harrison at the 2023 Texas Book Festival

Rachel Harrison is an American author of horror fiction.

== Career ==
Harrison has published eight books as of 2026. Three of Harrison's books have received starred reviews from Publishers Weekly or Library Journal.

Kirkus Reviews called The Return (2020) "a stylish and well-crafted horror debut" and noted, "Harrison successfully sustains a low, visceral dread throughout that eventually builds to a shocking crescendo [...] Patient readers who appreciate a slow burn with an explosive payoff will be rewarded". Publishers Weekly wrote: "The tension and nuance of Harrison’s complicated female friendships add depth to an already delicious, chilling debut".

Publishers Weekly wrote a critical review of Cackle (2021): "Readers will need a taste for black humor to stomach the deep pain hiding behind the sarcastic narration, and even then, this ode to choosing the weirder life ultimately delivers less empowerment than revenge fantasy". Library Journal, however, gave it a starred review, noting, that the novel "showcases Harrison’s strength at writing powerful and empowered women with razor-sharp wit and a touch of darkness".

Publishers Weekly was also critical of Such Sharp Teeth (2022), writing: "The comedic tone of Rory’s social interactions rubs weirdly against the trauma plot, and the ultimate management of Rory’s werewolf-ism feels too pat, with Harrison failing to drive home an analogy between the transformation and Rory’s inner turmoil. It’s an emotionally confusing and unsatisfying mess". Library Journal praised the book with another starred review, noting that Harrison's "latest is a rip-roaring, bloody adventure that also explores the wounds trauma can leave on both the body and the psyche" and her "style is gripping and will keep you reading way past your bedtime".

Paste reviewed her short story collection, Bad Dolls (2022), positively, noting: "Harrison reveals an astonishing knack for conveying a great deal about a person with a single clever observation." Bad Dolls was recommended by The New York Times, which said: "Harrison’s feminist horror novels are some of the most original and entertaining out there, and this story collection is right up there with her longer works".

Kirkus Reviews wrote in a 2025 review of Play Nice that "there are many emotionally devastating moments in this novel, but this one captures the essence of them all. Harrison knows that we are, all of us, haunted."

== Selected works ==
- The Return. Berkley, 2020.
- Cackle. Berkley, 2021.
- Such Sharp Teeth. Berkley, 2022.
- Bad Dolls. Penguin, 2022.
- Black Sheep. Penguin, 2023.
- So Thirsty. Berkley, 2024.
- Play Nice. Berkley, 2025.
- Kiss Slay Replay. Berkley, 2026.
