= Jenny Kiefer =

American horror author

Jenny Kiefer is an American horror author. She is the author of This Wretched Valley published by Quirk Books (2024). In addition to being an author, Kiefer owns and manages Butcher Cabin Books, a horror bookstore in Louisville, Kentucky.

Kiefer received a Master of Arts in English from the University of Louisville in 2017. She won the Miracle Monocle Editor's Award for Emerging Writers in 2017, as well as four Society of Professional Journalists Awards in 2018. She is a member of the Horror Writers Association.

== Publications ==
=== Novels ===
- This Wretched Valley. Quirk Books. 2024. ISBN 9781683693680.
- Crafting for Sinners. Quirk Books. 2025. ISBN 9781683694700.

=== Short stories ===
- Kiefer, J. L. (2022). "Palette". In McMillan, P. L.; Forse, Solomon (eds.). Howls from the Dark Ages. HOWL Society Press. ISBN 9781736780046.
