= Joe Ledger series =

Series of science fiction novels by Jonathan Maberry

The Joe Ledger Series
- (in publication order); Patient Zero (2009); The Dragon Factory (2010); The King of Plagues (2011); Assassin's Code (2012); Extinction Machine (2013); Code Zero (2014); Predator One (2015); Kill Switch (2016); Dogs of War (2017); Deep Silence (2018)
- Author: Jonathan Maberry
- Country: United States
- Genre: Science fiction, War novel, Military fiction, thriller
- Publisher: St. Martin's Griffin
- Published: 2009 – 2018
- Media type: Print (hardcover and paperback)

Joe Ledger is the name of an ongoing series of bio-terrorism thriller books written by Jonathan Maberry, beginning with the 2009 Patient Zero. The series also includes several short stories, audio originals and novellas.

The first three books in the series were optioned for a potential television series on ABC and a pilot was written by Javier Grillo-Marxuach. It was not picked up for a full series. In August 2024, it was announced that a television series adaptation of the novels was to be developed and produced by Chad Stahelski and his production studio.

== Synopsis ==
The series follows the titular Captain Joe Ledger, a former Army Ranger and Baltimore police detective. Joe is hired by a clandestine, investigative agency known as the Department of Military Sciences (DMS). The DMS is a shadow agency formed for the purpose of pursuing technologically advanced threats to the US and the world at large by terrorists. Threats encountered throughout the series range from designer pathogens that create zombies to transgenics used for ethnic cleansing.

== The Books ==
Patient Zero

- Intro Joe Ledger, welcome to the DMS: zombie Outbreak incoming.

The Dragon Factory

- Genetic experiments and Nazi scientists: countdown to Doomsday.

The King of Plagues

- The group that steers the world to their whim: A new King of Plagues has a plan.

Assassin's Code

- Vampires are real and emerging from their ancient catacombs.

Extinction Machine

- Alien Technology: the Truth is out there.

Code Zero

- Worst case scenario: Zombies, mutants, plagues, vampires, and tech. Kill the world.

Predator One

- New age of High Tech killing machines: the battlefield is everywhere.

Kill Switch

- All power is taken down, new assassins arise, the light is gone.

Dogs of War

- Robots, AI, and nanobots. No more human masters.

Deep Silence

- Into the mind of madness. The old ones awake.

== The Characters ==
Echo Team—Current members

- Captain Joseph Edwin "Joe" Ledger: Call sign "Cowboy". Main character. Before being recruited by the DMS, he was a detective for the Baltimore Police Department and a former U.S. Army Ranger. These professions have helped him control his rage issues following the rape of his ex-girlfriend Helen in high school, who ultimately committed suicide.
- First Sergeant Bradley "Top" Sims: Call sign, "Sergeant Rock", former Army Ranger. Lost his son Henry while his daughter Monique lost both legs during the War in Iraq.
- Harvey 'Bunny' Rabbit: Former Force Recon, call sign "Green Giant".
- Tracy Cole: Former policewoman, call sign "Gorgon". Joined the team in Dogs of War and was directly recruited by Top and Bunny. Suggested policemen Pete Smith and Brenden Tate for recruitment into Echo Team. Noted to be a very good hand-to-hand fighter.

Echo Team Members	Patient Zero	The Dragon Factory	The King of Plagues	Assassin's Code	Extinction Machine	Code Zero	Predator One	Kill Switch	Dogs of War	Total
Captain Joe "Cowboy" Ledger	X mark	X mark	X mark	X mark	X mark	X mark	X mark	X mark	X mark	9
First Sergeant Bradley "Top" "Sgt. Rock" Sims	X mark	X mark	X mark	X mark	X mark	X mark	X mark	X mark	X mark	9
Master Sergeant Harvey "Bunny" "Jolly Green Giant" Rabbit	X mark	X mark	X mark	X mark	X mark	X mark	X mark	X mark	X mark	9
Chief Petty Officer Samuel "Skip" "Joker" Tyler	X mark									1
Second Lieutenant Oliver "Ollie" "Scarface" Brown	X mark									1
Sergeant Robert "Big Bob" Faraday		X mark	X mark							2
Joey Goldschein			X mark							1
DeeDee "Scream Queen" Whitman			X mark							1
Khalid "Dancing Duck" Shaheed			X mark	X mark						2
John "Chatterbox" Smith			X mark	X mark						2
Lydia "Warbride" Ruiz				X mark	X mark	X mark	X mark	X mark		5
Pete "Prankster"					X mark					1
Ivan "Hellboy" Yankovich					X mark	X mark				2
Sam "Ronin" Imura					X mark	X mark	X mark	X mark	X mark	5
Duncan "Dunk" "Bad Wolf" MacDougall						X mark				1
Noah "Gandalf" Fallon						X mark				1
Montana "Stretch" Parker						X mark	X mark	X mark		3
Brian "Hot Zone" Botley							X mark	X mark		2
Ghost - Canine member of Echo			X mark	X mark	X mark	X mark	X mark	X mark	X mark	7

Other DMS members

- Dr. Rudolfo Ernesto "Rudy" Sanchez y Martinez: Joe's psychiatrist and best friend. He is a religious man and gets recruited into the DMS. Wears an eyepatch and walks with a cane due to injuries sustained in Extinction Machine.
- Mr. Church: Head of the DMS. Very little is known about Mr. Church. He has only one living relative as his wife and other daughter were killed due to his work. He likes vanilla wafers and usually wears tinted glasses to hide his eyes, and gloves on his hands following the extreme frost bite during the events of Predator One. He is also known as the "Deacon", "St. Germaine", "Cardinal", "Saishi", "Episkopos", and many other names—all as false as "Mr. Church".
- Major Grace Courtland: A former SAS soldier who was later recruited into the DMS. She is also a love interest for Joe Ledger. Killed by Conrad Veder during the Jakoby affair.
- Jerome "Bug" Taylor: A playful hacker that works for Mr. Church and the DMS. He was hired after he hacked the DHS as his senior project to find bin Laden.
- Dr. William Hu: Chief Scientist for the DMS. He is called an asshole by many of the DMS staff and also described as having no soul. Shot and killed in Kill Switch.
- Dr. Circe O' Tree: The daughter of Mr. Church and holds multiple Ph.D.s and master's degrees. She is the love interest of Rudy Sanchez; they marry in Extinction Machine.
- Gunnery Sergeant Bricklin Anderson: Former DMS field agent, lost leg in combat. Mr. Church's current assistant and bodyguard. First appeared in The Dragon Factory
- Brian 'Birddog' Bird: Logistics In Field Utility for the DMS. Ensures the field teams get all the hardware they need. Works closely with Brick. First appeared in Extinction Machine.
- Sam Imura: Former Echo Team sniper. Leaves Echo Team at the end of Kill Switch and begins running the Warehouse in Baltimore.
- Aunt Sallie: Mr. Church's second-in-command. It is implied that Church and Sallie used to be field agents together back in the day. Runs the Hangar at Floyd Bennett Field. Almost died during the events of Predator One. She and Joe have a less than amicable relationship.
- Doc Holliday: Hired to replace Dr. Hu. First appears in Deep Silence.

Enemies

- Sebastian Gault: A molecular biologist and bio-terrorist who helped fund the creation of the Seif al Din pathogen which causes those infected by it to re-animate into "zombies". He does not want to destroy the world but be the richest man in it. Joins the Seven Kings during King of Plagues, his title being the namesake of the book. Believed to be deceased after his boat explodes, but is found to be barely alive and acting as the last of the Seven Kings during Predator One. Killed by Joe at the end of the book.
- Hecate Jackoby: Geneticist who helped create bio-engineered creatures to sell to the rich.
- Paris Jackoby: Brother of Hecate and also a Geneticist.
- Eris: Leader of the Seven Kings and mother of Hugo Vox.
- The Seven Kings: A secret society and enemies to the Bonesmen that orchestrates world events in order to profit financially. Uses misinformation and disinformation and has agents seeded everywhere, making it difficult to track them down. Believed to be in shambles after the events of Predator One, as the last of the Seven Kings is killed at the end of the book.
- The Red Order/Knights: Group of Assassin Vampires that appear in the Assassins Code.
- Mother Night: Former DMS agent turned rogue bent on world destruction by using a bio-terror plot to infect everyone with the Seif-al-Din pathogen. Committed suicide.
- Nicodemus: Mysterious 'priest' who has no particular alignment. Aided the Seven Kings and disappeared after Assassin's Code but was found to be alive and well in Dogs of War, under the alias of John the Revalator. Enigmatic clues in Deep Silence suggest Mr. Church and Nicodemus may have once worked together long ago.
- Hugo Vox: Son of Eris and high up in the Seven Kings' command chain. Was a trusted ally of the US Government and Mr. Church. Worked as a recruiter for various black-ops teams. Became an international fugitive after his treachery came to light at the end of King of Plagues and killed by Mr. Church at the end of Assassin's Code.
- Zephyr Bain: Niece of Hugo Vox and lover of John the Revelator. Robotic and computer intelligence developer who creates Havoc, White Hat, and the AI system Calpurnia in Dogs of War.
- Valen Oruraka: Geophysicist, seismologist, and member of the Russian communist group called the New Soviet that tries to return Communist Russia to power in Deep Silence. Tasked by Gadyuka with collecting green Lemurian quartz for use in constructing movable God Machines which can cause earthquakes.

Allies

- Violin: Member of Arklight and the Mothers of the Fallen. Former love interest of Joe Ledger., in a relationship with Harry Bolt.
- Junie Flynn: A woman who runs a conspiracy podcast show and has some alien DNA from a covert experiment. She is another love interest for Joe Ledger and later becomes Joe's girlfriend in Code Zero.
- Alexander "Toys" Chismer: Former assistant/valet to Gault, then protégé of Vox, now on a path to redemption with the support of Church. Works with Junie at Freetech.
- Harry Bolt: CIA field agent, sarcastically and non-sarcastically known as the world's worst spy. Son of American legendary CIA Agent Harcourt Bolton. Develops a relationship with Violin in Kill Switch.
- Lydia Ruiz: Former Echo Team member. Left the team at the end of Kill Switch and joined Junie's company, Freetech, as Head of Security. Is in a relationship with Bunny.
- Lilith: Founder of Arklight and mother of Violin. Former lover of Mr. Church and current lover in Deep Silence.

== Bibliography ==
1. Patient Zero (2009)
2. The Dragon Factory (2010)
3. The King of Plagues (2011)
4. Assassins Code (2012)
5. Extinction Machine (2013)
6. Code Zero (2014)
7. Predator One (2015)
8. Kill Switch (2016)
9. Dogs of War (2017)
10. Deep Silence (2018)

=== Shorts ===
- Countdown (2011, Number 0.5)
- Zero Tolerance (2011, Number 1.1)
- Material Witness (2011, Number 1.2)
- Deep, Dark (2011, Number 1.3)
- Dog Days (2011, Number 2.1)
- Changeling(2011, Number 2.2)
- Mad Science (2011, Number 4.1)
- Borrowed Power (2013, Number 4.2)

=== Collections ===
- Joe Ledger: Special Ops [containing: Countdown, Zero Tolerance, Deep Dark, Material Witness, Changeling, Mad Science, Artifact, The Handyman Gets Out, Borrowed Power] (2014)
- Joe Ledger: Unstoppable (2017)

=== Spin-Offs ===
1. Rage: A Rogue Team International Novel (2019)
2. Relentless: A Joe Ledger and Rogue Team International Novel (Release Date: July 13, 2021)
3. Cave 13 (Release Date:August 29, 2023)
4. Burn to Shine: A Joe Ledger and Rogue Team International Novel (Release Date: March 4, 2025)
