= Breathers: A Zombie's Lament =

2009 novel by S. G. Browne

Breathers: A Zombie’s Lament
- Cover of Breathers: A Zombie's Lament
- Author: S. G. Browne
- Cover artist: Michael Windsor
- Language: English
- Genre: Horror, Satire, Humor, Fiction
- Publisher: Broadway Books
- Publication date: March 2009
- Publication place: United States
- Media type: Print Trade paperback
- Pages: 320 pp
- ISBN: 978-0-7679-3061-1

Breathers: A Zombie's Lament (Broadway Books) is a romantic zombie comedy novel by first-time author S. G. Browne, published in 2009. The story is told from the point of view of Andy Warner, a newly revived zombie who lives in his parents' basement, attends Undead Anonymous meetings, and is in love with another zombie, Rita, who killed herself by slashing her own throat. As he seeks to survive in a world that hates zombies, Andy must regularly consume formaldehyde while all he and every zombie really wants is to eat human flesh, which is forbidden.

== Plot summary ==
Andy Warner is a zombie, having reanimated after a fatal car wreck that killed his wife, orphaned his daughter, and left Andy disfigured and unintelligible. Reviled and discriminated against by a society that no longer considers him human, Andy is an outcast. He spends his new existence watching cable television in his parents’ wine cellar and attending Undead Anonymous meetings with other zombies, where he finds kindred souls in Rita and Jerry. After they meet Ray, a rogue zombie who introduces them to the joys of consuming human flesh, Andy embarks on a journey of self-discovery that leads to a media-driven, class-action lawsuit on behalf of the rights of zombies everywhere.

== Film adaptation ==
The film rights for Breathers have been purchased by Fox Searchlight Pictures, with Diablo Cody and Mason Novick co-producing and Geoff LaTulippe adapting the script.

== See also ==
- List of zombie short films and undead-related projects
