= Tony Richards (author) =

English dark fantasy and horror author (born 1956)

Tony Richards is an English dark fantasy and horror author. He was born in 1956 in Greenford, England, and educated at University College School, Hampstead, before going on to study law at Middlesex University. Although he has written science fiction, mystery, and even mainstream stories, he is principally an author of supernatural, dark fantasy, and horror fiction. He has published three full-length novels, five novellas, and more than sixty short stories. His work has seen print in most major genre outlets, and he is a frequent contributor to Cemetery Dance Magazine and to anthologies compiled by the British editor Stephen Jones. An avid traveller, his fiction is often set in locations he has visited, most notably in his 2004 stand-alone novella Postcards from Terri, where the peripatetic heroine of the title goes to Hong Kong, Japan, Africa, Switzerland, Nicaragua, Istanbul, Budapest, Barcelona, Ottawa, Chicago, New York, Vancouver, and San Francisco during the course of the story. It is this quality that prompted the editor, publisher, and critic John Pelan to say of him: He’s convincing … convincing enough that the locals will read about their city as described by Tony Richards and shudder. And that’s what we call a writers' writer. He has twice been nominated, first in 1988 for the Bram Stoker Award for Best First Novel for The Harvest Bride, and then in 2008 for the British Fantasy Award for Best Collection for Going Back. He is married to Louise Richards, and lives in London. His latest novel, Dark Rain, is set in the fictional town of Raine’s Landing, Massachusetts, and is intended to be the first of a series of books located there. The second such novel, Night of Demons, is scheduled for publication in 2009.

== Novels ==
- The Harvest Bride, Tor, 1987.
- Night Feast, Pan Macmillan, 1995.
- Dark Rain, Eos/HarperCollins, 2008.

== Collections ==
- Ghost Dance, Sarob Press, 2005.
- Going Back, Elastic Press , 2007.
- No-Man and Other Tales, Pendragon Press, 2007.
- Passport to Purgatory, Gray Friar Press , 2008.
- Shadows and Other Tales, Dark Regions Press , 2008.
