= Deborah Coates =

American author

Deborah Coates is an American author. She grew up in western New York, and currently lives in Ames, Iowa. Her stories have been included in Strange Horizons, SCIFICTION, Best American Fantasy 2008, Year's Best Fantasy 6, and Best Paranormal Romance.

== Bibliography ==
=== Novels ===
- Wide Open (March 13, 2012, ISBN 0-7653-2898-4)
- Deep Down (March 5, 2013, ISBN 0-7653-2900-X)
- Strange Country (May 27, 2014, ISBN 9780765329028)

=== Short stories ===
- "What Makes a River" (2010). Tor
- "A Wish for a Yak" (Alphabet Series Volume I, Book 15)
- "Cowgirls in Space" (2009). Asimov's Science Fiction, April–May 2009
- "How to Hide Your Heart (2008). Strange Horizons, 21 January 2008
- "The Whale's Lover (2008). Asimov's Science Fiction, January 2008
- "Articles of a Personal Nature (2007)
- "Chainsaw on Hand" (2007).
- "46 Directions, None of Them North" (2006). Asimov's Science Fiction, March 2006
- "Magic In a Certain Slant Of Light" (2005). Strange Horizons
- "I Am the Noise of Silence" (1999). The Age of Reason: Stories for a New Millennium
- "The Queen of Mars" (1998). Between the Darkness and the Fire: 23 Tales of Imaginative Fiction from the Internet
- "Tally" (1997). The Magazine of Fantasy & Science Fiction, May 1997
- "Flyboy (1995). A Starfarer's Dozen: Stories of Things to Come
- "Girls Who Never Stood a Chance" (2019). The Magazine of Fantasy & Science Fiction, July/August 2019
