= D. G. K. Goldberg =

American novelist

D. G. K. Goldberg (Diane Gail Kelly Goldberg) (October 20, 1953 – January 14, 2005) Kelly Goldberg graduated from Coker College and also received an MSSW from the University of Tennessee. After working at several agencies as a clinical social worker, she became a writer. As d.g.k. goldberg, she published two horror novels, Skating on the Edge and Doomed to Repeat It, and published hundreds of short stories and non-fiction articles. Her topics were varied and her writing appeared in publications as divergent as Chicken Soup for the Romantic Soul, More Monsters from Memphis, and Trackside. A lifelong NASCAR fanatic, much of her non-fiction dealt with the sport. She also traveled widely and wrote for many travel websites and publications. She was a member of the Horror Writers Association, the Science Fiction and Fantasy Writers of America, and the International Food, Wine and Travel Writers Association. The Goldberg Horror Award is named in her honor.

== Bibliography ==
- Skating on the Edge (novel, 2001) (Bram Stoker Award nominee)
- Doomed to Repeat It (novel, 2001)
- NASCAR for Rookie Fans (Audio CD, 2002)
- Queen of the Country (collection, 2008)
