= The Harvest Bride =

1987 novel by Tony Richards

The Harvest Bride is a novel by Tony Richards published in 1987.

== Plot summary ==
The Harvest Bride is a thriller with supernatural elements.

== Reception ==
Dave Langford reviewed The Harvest Bride for White Dwarf #99, and stated that "at once hurled aside on the grounds of excessive cuteness. I must try to be nicer."

== Reviews ==
- Review by Charles de Lint (1987) in Fantasy Review, May 1987
- Review by Don D'Ammassa (1987) in Science Fiction Chronicle, #96 September 1987
- Review by Phyllis McDonald (1988) in Interzone, #24 Summer 1988
