= Donna Thorland =

American screenwriter and author

Donna Thorland is an American screenwriter and author of historical fiction.

Raised in Bergenfield, New Jersey, Thorland graduated from Saddle River Day School in 1991. She later earned a degree in Classics and Art History from Yale University, and an MFA in Film Production from the USC School of Cinematic Arts.

As an author, Thorland's novels concern women during the American Revolution. Her "Renegades of the Revolution" series is published by Random House.

As a screenwriter, Thorland has written episodes for shows such as Tron: Uprising, Chilling Adventures of Sabrina, Salem, Shadow and Bone, and Good Witch.

== Publications ==
=== Renegades of the Revolution ===
- The Turncoat. New American Library. 2013. ISBN 978-0-451-41539-4.
- The Rebel Pirate. New American Library. 2014. ISBN 978-0-451-41540-0.
- Mistress Firebrand. New American Library. 2015. ISBN 978-0-451-47101-7.
- The Dutch Girl. New American Library. 2016. ISBN 978-0-451-47102-4.
