= S. G. Browne =

American novelist

S.G. Browne
- Born: December 20, 1965 (age 60); Sierra Vista, Arizona
- Education: University of the Pacific
- Occupation: Novelist
- Writing career
- Genres: Supernatural, Humor, Horror, Satire

S.G. “Scott” Browne is an American author of dark comedy and social satire. His debut novel, Breathers: A Zombie's Lament, is a dark rom-zom-com (romantic-zombie-comedy) told from the point of view of a zombie. His second novel, Fated, a black comedy about fate and destiny, was released on November 2, 2010. Lucky Bastard, a novel about a man with the ability to steal other people's luck with a handshake, was released April 17, 2012, and was his third published novel. His fourth novel is Big Egos, released in August 2013. Big Egos is about a drug that lets the user become an authorized fictional character or dead celebrity for 6–8 hours and a quality assurance employee who takes on an unsafe number of artificial identities.

== Biography ==
S.G. Browne was born in Sierra Vista, Arizona. He attended the University of the Pacific in Stockton, California, from 1984 to 1989, where he majored in business organization. It was during that time that Browne began to actively pursue writing.

In 1992, Browne moved to Santa Cruz, California, where he lived for fourteen years writing novels and short stories while working as an office manager.

In 1993, Browne's first short story “Wish You Were Here,” was published in Redcat magazine.

In 2006, Browne completed Breathers: A Zombie's Lament. Breathers eventually caught the attention of an agent, and in January 2008, Breathers was picked up by Broadway Books. The novel was released in March 2009 to overwhelmingly positive reviews.

Soon after its release, the film rights for Breathers were optioned by Fox Searchlight Studios to be produced by Diablo Cody. While a second option for the film rights was picked up, the film never went into production.

Browne’s second novel, Fated, was published by Penguin/NAL in November 2010.

On April 17, 2012, Browne's third novel, Lucky Bastard was published. It features a story of a private detective with the ability to steal other people's luck with a simple handshake. In June 2013, the television rights for Lucky Bastard were optioned by Entertainment One. No second option for the television rights was picked up.

== Other credits ==
Browne’s short stories have appeared in several anthologies, including The Living Dead 2.

Browne also penned the introduction to the regional zombie anthology Zombie St. Pete.
