= DeMott =

DeMott or De Mott is a given name and a surname. Notable people with the name include:

== Middle name ==
- James DeMott Condit (1821-1863), American politician and soldier

== Surname ==
- Ben Demott (1889–1963), Baseball pitcher
- Benjamin DeMott (1924–2005), American English professor
- Bill DeMott (born 1966), American retired professional wrestler
- John De Mott (1790–1870), American businessmen and politician
- Robert DeMott (born 1943), American author and scholar
- Wes DeMott, American political thriller writer

== See also ==
- Demott–Westervelt House, historic house in New Jersey, United States
