= Leisure Books =

Former book publisher

- Parent company: Dorchester Publishing (c. 1982–Present)
- Founded: 1957
- Founder: Harry Shorten
- Country of origin: United States
- Headquarters location: New York City
- Key people: Jean Marie Stine (book acquisitions & development editor); Don D'Auria (Executive Editor, 1995–2010)
- Publication types: Books
- Fiction genres: Horror, Thriller, Westerns
- Official website: www.leisurebookpublishing.com

Leisure Books was a mass market paperback publisher specializing in horror and thrillers that operated from 1957 to Present. In the company's early years, it also published fantasy, science fiction, Westerns, and the Wildlife Treasury card series.

Leisure Books offered a book sales club service. Typically, two free books were provided as an initial inducement. After that two books were sent on a monthly basis. Readers would have ten days to keep or return. If kept there would be a discount on the purchase price.

From around 1982 onward, Leisure Books was an imprint of Dorchester Publishing, shifting the company's focus away from fantasy and science fiction and more towards horror. As such, Leisure published novels and collections by a number of horror's notable authors, including Douglas Clegg, Stacy Dittrich, Ray Garton, J. F. Gonzalez, Brian Keene, Jack Ketchum, Richard Laymon, Deborah LeBlanc, Edward Lee, Ronald Malfi, Graham Masterton, T. V. Olsen, and Sarah Pinborough.

Leisure horror titles won numerous awards, including the Bram Stoker Award and the International Horror Guild Award. In addition, a Leisure title was given the 2002 World Fantasy Award.

== History ==
Harry Shorten founded Leisure Books in 1957.

Leisure's Westerns line notably featured re-issues of the work of Max Brand, among others. The company published six titles in Nelson DeMille (as Jack Cannon)'s Joe Ryker Series in 1975–1976.

Leisure Books published the Wildlife Treasury educational animal encyclopedia for young children between 1975 and 1981.

Beginning in 1976, Leisure Books published Gardner Fox's fantasy series featuring the barbarian Kyrik: Warlock Warrior, Kyrik Fights the Demon World, Kyrik and the Wizard's Sword, and Kyrik and the Lost Queen.

By the year 2000, Leisure Books was the only American publisher with a line of horror books.

Effective September 2010, Leisure Books, along with the remainder of Dorchester's mass market paperback lines, were canceled as print publications. Future titles were slated to be available only as e-books. After pushback from authors over cancelled and unfulfilled contracts, Leisure suspended operations entirely; the parent company Dorchester shortly went out of business.

== Selected list of titles by author ==
=== 1957–1981 ===
- Nelson DeMille (as Jack Cannon):
  - Joe Ryker Series
    - The Sniper (1974)
    - The Hammer of God (1974)
    - The Agent of Death (1975)
    - The Smack Man (1975)
    - The Cannibal (1975)
    - The Night of the Phoenix (1975)
- R. V. Fodor and G. J.Taylor, :
  - Impact! (1979) ISBN 0-8439-0648-0
- Gardner Fox:
  - Kyrik Series:
    - Kyrik: Warlock Warrior (1975)
    - Kyrik Fights the Demon World (1975)
    - Kyrik and the Wizard's Sword (1976)
    - Kyrik and the Lost Queen (1976)
- William Greenleaf
  - Time Jumper (1980)
- L. Ron Hubbard
  - Death's Deputy (Fantasy Publishing Company, Inc., 1948; mass market paperback re-issue by Leisure Books, 1971)
- Lloyd Kropp:
  - The Drift (Doubleday, 1969; mass market paperback reprints in 1971 [Belmont Books] and 1979 [Leisure Books])

=== 1982–2010 ===
- Christopher Belton:
  - Isolation (2003) ISBN 0-8439-5295-4
  - Nowhere to Run (2004) ISBN 0-8439-5380-2
- Raymond Benson:
  - Sweetie's Diamonds (Five Star/Thomson Gale, 2006; mass market paperback edition by Leisure Books, 2007)
  - A Hard Day's Death (2008)
  - Dark Side of the Morgue (March 2009)
- Parris Afton Bonds:
  - Spinster's Song (1992) ISBN 0-84-393316-X
- Mort Castle:
  - Cursed Be the Child (1994)
- Simon Clark:
  - Ghost Monster (2009) ISBN 978-0-8439-6179-9
  - Darkness Demands (2001) ISBN 978-0-8439-4898-1
  - Blood Crazy (1995) Hodder Headline, reissued by Leisure Books, 2001, ISBN 978-0-8439-4825-7
- Douglas Clegg:
  - The Halloween Man (1998)
  - The Nightmare Chronicles (1999)
  - You Come When I Call You (2000)
  - Mischief (2000)
  - The Infinite (2001) — sequel to The Nightmare House (which was published by Cemetery Dance)
  - Naomi (2001)
- Wes DeMott:
  - The Fund (2004)
  - Heat Sync (2006)
- Dennis Etchison:
  - (editor) The Museum of Horrors (2001)
- John Everson:
  - Covenant (Delirium Books, 2004; Leisure Books, 2008)
  - Sacrifice (Delirium Books, 2007; Leisure Books, 2009)
  - The 13th (Necro Publications, 2009; Leisure Books, 2009)
  - Siren (Bad Moon Books, 2010; Leisure Books, 2010)
- Christine Feehan:
  - Lair of the Lion (2002)
  - Dark Guardian (2002)
  - Dark Destiny (2004)
- Brian James Freeman:
  - (as James Kidman) Black Fire (Cemetery Dance Publications, hardcover, and Leisure Books, paperback 2004)
- Steve Gerlach:
  - Rage (2003): Wild Roses Productions. (January 2004): Bloodletting Press. Published as a 26-copy leather-bound hardcover and 300-copy limited hardcover. ISBN 0-9720859-2-0 (2004): Leisure Books. Published as a mass market paperback. ISBN 0-8439-5311-X
- Zane Grey:
  - Tonto Basin (1921; mass market paperback by Leisure Books, 2006)
- Teri A. Jacobs:
  - The Void (2002)
- Ruby Jean Jensen (as R.J. Hendrickson):
  - Hear the Children Cry (1982)
- Brian Keene:
  - Ghoul (February 2007)
  - Dead Sea (August 2007)
  - Darkness On the Edge of Town (October 2008)
  - Castaways (February 2009)
  - Urban Gothic (August 2009)
  - The Rising Series
    - The Rising (April 2003): Delirium Books (January 2004)
    - City of the Dead (January 2005): Delirium Books(June 2005)
  - Earthworm Gods series
    - Earthworm Gods (September 2005): Delirium Books, Republished as The Conqueror Worms (May 2006): Leisure Books, Republished again under its intended title Earthworm Gods (December 2012) Deadite Press ISBN 0-8439-5416-7
  - Levi Stoltzfus Series
    - Dark Hollow (July 2006): (released in hardcover as The Rutting Season) Bloodletting Press. (February 2008)
    - Ghost Walk (August 2008)
    - A Gathering of Crows (August 2010)
- Nate Kenyon:
  - Bloodstone (Five Star Publishing, 2006; Leisure Books, 2008)
  - The Reach (2008)
  - The Bone Factory (July 2009)
  - Sparrow Rock (May 2010)
- Jack Ketchum:
  - The Girl Next Door (Warner Books, 1989; mass market paperback by Leisure Books)
  - The Lost (2001)
  - Peaceable Kingdom (2003)
  - Old Flames (2008)
  - (co-written with Lucky McKee) The Woman (2010)
- Richard Laymon:
  - Among the Missing (Headline Publishing Group & Leisure Books, 1999)
- Deborah LeBlanc:
  - Family Inheritance (2004)
  - Grave Intent (2005)
  - A House Divided (2006)
  - Morbid Curiosity (2007)
  - Water Witch (2008)
- Edward Lee:
  - Infernal Angel (2003): Cemetery Dance Publications. Published as a 26-copy leather-bound hardcover and 750-copy limited hardcover. (January 2004): Leisure Books. Published as a Mass Market Paperback.
  - Messenger (August 2004): Leisure Books. Published as a Mass Market Paperback.
  - The Backwoods (October 2005): Leisure Books. Published as a Mass Market Paperback.
  - Flesh Gothic (February 2005): Leisure Books. Published as a Mass Market Paperback.
  - Gast (2007) (October 2009): Leisure Books. Revised, retitled Black Train, and published as a Mass Market Paperback.
  - House Infernal (October 2007): Leisure Books. Published as a Mass Market Paperback.
  - Brides of the Impaler (September 2008): Leisure Books. Published as a Mass Market Paperback.
  - Golemesque (March 2009): Necro Publications. Published as a 26-copy leather-bound hardcover and 300-copy limited hardcover. (April 2009): Leisure Books. Published as Golem as a Mass Market Paperback.
- Ronald Malfi:
  - Snow (March 2010)
- James A. Moore:
  - Fireworks (Meisha Merlin Publishing, 2001 and Leisure Books, 2003) ISBN 0-8439-5247-4
  - Under the Overtree (Meisha Merlin Publishing, 2000 and Leisure Books, 2002) ISBN 0-8439-5110-9
  - Chris Corin series
    - Possessions (2004) ISBN 0-8439-5171-0
    - Rabid Growth (2005) ISBN 0-8439-5172-9
- T. V. Olsen:
  - The Stalking Moon, Doubleday (publisher) 1965, new ed. Leisure Books 5/2010, ISBN 978-0-8439-4180-7
  - Mission to the West, Ace 1/1973, new ed. Leisure 9/1997, ISBN 978-0-8439-4308-5
  - Starbuck's Brand, Belmont Tower 1974, new ed. Leisure 11/1997, ISBN 978-0-8439-4326-9
  - Westward They Rode, Ace 1/1976, new ed. Leisure 7/1996, ISBN 978-0-8439-4021-3
  - Track the Man Down, Manor Books 1976, new ed. Leisure 10/1998, ISBN 0-8439-4369-6
- Sarah Pinborough:
  - The Hidden (2004) ISBN 978-0843954807
  - The Reckoning (2005) ISBN 978-0843955507
  - Breeding Ground (2006) ISBN 978-0843957419 — End-of-the world novel where most of the population is wiped out by giant spiders that human women have given birth to
  - The Taken (2007) ISBN 978-0843958966 — ghostly revenge novel
  - Tower Hill (2008) ISBN 978-0-8439-6052-5 — about a small town in America in supernatural peril of Biblical proportions
  - Feeding Ground (2009) ISBN 0843962933 — sequel to Breeding Ground
- Brian Pinkerton:
  - Abducted (2004)
  - Vengeance (2005)
- Al Sarrantonio:
  - The Orangefield Cycle
    - Halloweenland (Leisure Books Mass Market Paperback 2007; Cemetery Dance limited edition hardcover, 2009; Crossroad Press e-book, 2012) - A novel length book that includes elements of The Baby and much more new material (the Leisure paperback also includes the original version of The Baby as a bonus).
- John Skipp:
  - The Long Last Call (2006, Cemetery Dance Publications; Limited edition hardcover / Leisure Books, 2007; paperback)
- T. M. Wright:
  - Sleepeasy (Victor Gollancz 1993, Leisure, 2001)
