= List of satyrs in popular culture =

Satyrs often make appearances in modern popular culture.

== Books and stories ==
- The serviceman who works for Pan in Stephen King's short story "The Lawnmower Man" is a satyr in disguise.
- The Satyr is an oft-made reference to the Dionysian in Friedrich Nietzsche's The Birth of Tragedy.
- Gnostic satyrs of both genders appear in Umberto Eco's Baudolino.
- Mr Tumnus is a faun and main character in The Lion, the Witch and the Wardrobe, as well as appearing in two other books in the Chronicles of Narnia series, by C. S. Lewis. Satyrs appear occasionally throughout the series.
- Grover Underwood in the Percy Jackson & the Olympians series is a satyr.
- Gleeson Hedge and his son Chuck in The Heroes of Olympus series are satyrs.
- In the young adult series, Fablehaven, satyrs are one of the many creatures found within the preserve, and several of them (Newel, Doren and Verl) play a significant role.
- Satyrs appear in the Oliver Onions story "Io" (1911).
- Satyr is one of many species of mutated creatures found on Earth in Roger Zelazny's 1966 Hugo award winning novel This Immortal.
- Satyrs appear in the Italian fairy tale Costanza / Costanzo by Giovanni Francesco Straparola. The protagonist, Costanzo, catches a satyr for the king. The satyr is able to reveal Costanzo's true identity as a woman.
- In Hans Christian Andersen's fairy tale "The Shepherdess and the Sweep" (1845), a bearded and horned satyr carved into the mahogany door of a curio cabinet is known as "Major-general-field-sergeant-commander Billy goat's legs" and threatens a porcelain shepherdess on a nearby table top with taking her for his wife. The shepherdess shudders in horror and flees the house with her lover, a porcelain chimney sweep with a princely face "as fair and rosy as a girl's".
- In Brian Keene's Dark Hollow (previously published as The Rutting Season) a satyr is summoned by a Pennsylvanian witch practicing black Pow-wow (folk magic) and uses its Pan Pipes to hypnotise and abduct women in order to procreate with them.
- In Peter S. Beagle's The Last Unicorn, the Satyr is one of the Creatures of the Night, Brought to Light in Mommy Fortuna's Midnight Carnival.
- Erotic romance author Elizabeth Amber's Lords of Satyr series follows satyr heroes—men who sprout second penises and fur upon the full moon.
- In the Book Satyrday Matthew was a satyr who raised the boy, Derin, from infancy.
- The creature in the 1914 short story "An Episode of Cathedral History" by M.R. James is variously described as a satyr and a Lamia.

== Comics ==
- Greg Tragos, a main character in Skin Deep, is a goat Satyr. There are also horse satyrs and fauns shown throughout the rest of the comic.
- In several Marvel Family stories, Satyrs appear as villains.

== Film and television ==
- The Pastoral Symphony section of Disney's Fantasia features baby Satyrs, sometimes called Fauns.
- In Guillermo del Toro's 2006 film Pan's Labyrinth, a young girl encounters a faun at the entrance to a magical kingdom. He gives her three challenges to determine if she is the long-lost princess of the Underworld.
- In Disney's 1997 film Hercules, the character Phil sports the name of the hero Philoctetes and the appearance of a satyr.
- In Ridley Scott's Legend, the villain Darkness bears many similarities to a satyr. Scott said that he wanted Darkness to be "very sexual", so wanted him to be a satyr.
- In the 1981 film Clash of the Titans, Zeus transforms Calibos into a satyr-like creature who is subsequently shunned and forced to live as an outcast in the swamps and marshes.
- Satyr is also the title of an award winning adult film starring Jenna Jameson.
- In Manos: The Hands of Fate, one of the characters, Torgo, was intended to be a satyr.
- In the 2008 Disney film Bedtime Stories the character Mickey (Russell Brand) is seen in one of Skeeter Bronson's (Adam Sandler) stories as a Satyr–Faun.
- In the adverts for O2 the actor Jim Howick plays a Satyr–Faun.
- Satyrs appear as the main antagonists in the Buck Rogers in the 25th Century episode "The Satyr". They are later revealed to be the result of a plague that turns adult males into satyr-like monsters.
- Satyrs appear in the second episode of Atlantis, "A Girl By Any Other Name". These satyrs are monkey-like creatures with goat-like eyes who serve the Maenads.
- In the 2017 film My Little Pony: The Movie, the Storm King resembles a satyr with the upper body of a baboon.
- In High Guardian Spice, Professor Moss Phlox is a blacksmith satyr who is Parsley's teacher and one of the school's guardians.

== Gaming ==
- In the computer game series Warcraft, Satyrs appear as corrupted Night Elves.
- In the video game God of War, the satyr is an enemy found towards the end of the game. They are depicted as extremely skilled fighters and are some of the toughest enemies found.
- The video game Gladius has Satyrs available as playable characters.
- In the game Mortal Kombat: Armageddon, the centaur Motaro, along with his entire race, have been cursed. In the game, the centaurs are said to have been turned into minotaurs; however, they resemble satyrs.
- The original Doom video game and its sequel Doom II: Hell on Earth feature two demonic creatures named Hell Knight and Baron of Hell as enemies. Both are satyrs with the ability to generate ectoplasmic energy.
- The Diablo video game series depicts several clans of satyrs (under the "generic" name of Goatmen) as enemies serving Diablo and his minions.
- In the PC game Titan Quest, Satyrs are a common enemy appearing in many different variations, and are the staple "trash mob" of the game's first act set in ancient Greece.
- In the PC game Rift, Satyrs are a damaging pet of the Druid, a soul of the Cleric calling.
- In the tabletop card game Magic: The Gathering, Satyrs are featured as hedonistic revelers on the Greek myth-inspired plane of Theros, and a satyr known as Xenagos the Reveler is the primary antagonist of the Theros block.

== Miscellaneous ==
- The Christian antagonist, Satan, is often depicted as a satyr-like being since between the late Middle Ages to Early Modern period, the link being pagan religions and the sinful pleasures that satyrs enjoy.
- The Satyr is the name of a satirical newspaper written by students of Manchester University.
- Satyr is the name of the union of the four revues at the faculty of science of the University of Copenhagen.
- Satyr is the pseudonym of Sigurd Wongraven, one of the founding members of black metal band Satyricon.
