= Cargo Cult Press =

Publisher of limited-edition horror novels

Cargo Cult Press was launched in 2008 by Brian and Beth Cartwright to publish limited edition books in the horror genre. Cargo Cult Press is particularly notable for bringing to the collector's market writers such as Andersen Prunty and Gina Ranalli, known primarily in for their work in the Bizarro genre. Cargo Cult Press titles were distributed only through the Horror Mall website and a small number of specialty booksellers. Despite the low print runs typical of the small press, their first publication, "Population Zero", was nominated for a Bram Stoker Award in Superior Achievement in Long Fiction.

== Publications ==
- "Population Zero" by Wrath James White (November 2008): Published as a 26-copy leather-bound hardcover and 150-copy limited hardcover.
- "Injustice" by Steve Gerlach (March 2009): Published as a 26-copy leather-bound hardcover and 150-copy limited hardcover.
- "Amber Rising" by Steve Gerlach (March 2009): Published as a 135-copy limited softcover.
- "Remains" by Michael McBride (March 2009): Published as a 26-copy leather-bound hardcover and 150-copy limited hardcover.
- "Market Adjustment" by Andersen Prunty (April 2009): Published as a 20-copy leather-bound hardcover and 86-copy limited hardcover.
- "The Sorrow King" by Andersen Prunty (June 2009): Published as a 26-copy leather-bound hardcover and 150-copy limited hardcover.
- "The Nocturne" by Steve Gerlach (August 2009): Published as a 26-copy leather-bound hardcover and 150-copy limited hardcover.
- "House of Fallen Trees" by Gina Ranalli (September 2009)
- "Valley of the Dead" by Kim Paffenroth (October 2009) Published as a 26-copy leather-bound hardcover and 150-copy limited hardcover.
- "Sex, Death, & Honey" by Brian Knight (October 2009)

== Digital Publications ==
- "Skin Flowers" by Gina Ranalli (2008)
- "The Night the Moon Made a Sound" by Andersen Prunty (2008)

== Subsidiary Presses ==
=== Six Little Friends ===
Originally proposed in March 2009 (20 March 2009) with the first title, "Sex, Death, & Honey" by Brian Knight, to be released in September 2009. The Six Little Friends imprint was to cater to the high-end collector's market, with low limitations, rare materials and the finest craftsmanship on par with such publishers as Infernal House and Charnel House. The press was subsequently put on hiatus on 31 March 2009 due to the late-2000s recession causing extremely low preorders where "Within four days all sales ceased" and vocal criticism on Horror Mall's The Haunt forum of the high price, $175 for the limited edition and $500 for the lettered edition, three times the price of a standard Cargo Cult limited and double the price of a Cargo Cult lettered edition.

== Reviews, Recognition, and Awards ==
Wrath James White was on the short list of nominees for the 2009 Bram Stoker Awards for "Population Zero".

Shroud Magazine interviewed Brian Cartwright in Issue #5 (May 2009).

Pod of Horror reviewed the Gina Ranalli title "House of Fallen Trees" in Podcast #53 (June 2009).

Rue Morgue interviewed Kim Paffenroth and reviewed "Valley of the Dead" in Issue #93 (September 2009).
