= Christopher Belton =

British writer

- Born: Christopher Stephen Belton; 25 August 1955 (age 71); Dalston, Hackney, London
- Died: 11 May 2024 (aged 69); Yokohama, Japan
- Occupation: Writer / translator (Japanese to English)
- Spouse: Michiyo Kato
- Children: 2
- Relatives: Terrance Belton & Bernice Belton
- Writing career
- Language: English / Japanese
- Genres: Non-fiction (linguistics, history, culture) and fiction (suspense, mystery, horror, fantasy)
- Website: www2.gol.com/users/cmb/

Christopher Belton (born 25 August 1955 in Hackney, London, UK) is a writer of both fiction and non-fiction, and a Japanese/English translator working from Yokohama, Japan.

Belton first moved to Japan in 1978 with his Japanese wife, and apart from four years in London between 1983 and 1987, he has lived in Japan ever since. Turning freelance in 1991, Belton has published more than 60 books as an author, more than 70 as a translator, and is well known in Japan for his contributions to literature, English learning and the publishing industry.

== Biography ==
Born and brought up in Hackney, North London, Belton attended Queensbridge Infants School, Gayhurst Junior School and Upton House Secondary School. Excelling at music, he won a scholarship to receive individual tuition from the Royal Academy of Music at the age of fourteen, and also played second trumpet for the London Schools Symphony Orchestra for a brief period in 1969. He spent two years with the chorus of the Royal Opera House Covent Garden as a juvenile, during which he appeared in the operas Peter Grimes, Tosca, Don Carlos, Don Giovanni, Falstaff, Norma and others, and was part of a three-week tour of West Berlin and Munich undertaken by the Royal Opera House in April 1970. He also appeared in Belasario, staged by the students of the Royal Academy of Music, at the Sadler's Wells Opera House in 1972.

Belton then turned his attention to modern music and played the guitar in several unsuccessful rock bands, occasionally moonlighting as a session musician, before becoming disillusioned with the music business in 1975 and moving from London to Dartmouth, Devon, with his wife, Michiyo, where they lived for the subsequent three years.

Belton and his family moved to Japan in 1978, where he taught English in Tokyo and its surrounding prefectures. They moved back to the UK in 1983, where he started working for the London office of JTB (Japan Travel Bureau.) He was transferred to the Tokyo office in 1987 and worked there until he resigned to become a freelance translator in 1991.

Despite his background in music, Belton stated in an interview with Ken Tamai (published in 決定版シャドーイング (ISBN 4-902091-13-5) in 2004,) that he has been writing for most of his life, with his first book penned at the age of eight (a biography of the cricketer Colin Cowdry.) His first published work, Crime sans Frontieres, was released in the UK in 1997 and was nominated, although not long-listed, for the prestigious Booker Prize. This attracted the attention of several Japanese publishers, resulting in Belton writing and publishing more than sixty books over the course of the following years.

== Published works ==
=== English language (author) ===
- Quotes from Literature (Ladder Series Level 5: collection of quotations from famous literature). Japan: IBC Publishing, December 2020. ISBN 978-4-7946-0646-4
- A State of Mind (collection of autobiographical essays). JPN: IBC Publishing Inc., 2013. ISBN 978-4-7946-0255-8
- Nowhere to Run (suspense novel). USA: Leisure Books (an imprint of Dorchester Publishing), 2004. ISBN 0-8439-5380-2
- Isolation (technothriller). USA: Leisure Books (an imprint of Dorchester Publishing), 2003. ISBN 0-8439-5295-4
- Crime Sans Frontieres (suspense novel). UK: Minerva Press, 1997. ISBN 1-86106-704-6

=== Foreign language (author) ===
(English titles are direct translations, not official titles)

- Knowledgeable and Intellectual English Conversation - Edition 2 (知識と教養の英会話＜第2版＞) (Japanese language non-fiction). Japan: DHC, June 2018. ISBN 978-4-88724-608-9
- TRANSCULTURE:Transcending Time, Region and Ethnicity (English language university textbook). Japan: Kinseido, February 2017. ISBN 4-7647-4042-7
- How to Enjoy Roald Dahl in English (ロアルド・ダールが英語で楽しく読める本) (Japanese language non-fiction). Japan: CosmoPier Publishing, October 2016. ISBN 4-864541-06-X
- Reading Harry Potter Vol. 8 in the Original English (「ハリー・ポッター」Vol.8が英語で楽しく読める本) (Japanese language non-fiction). Japan: CosmoPier Publishing, October 2016. ISBN 4-864540-99-3
- Intensive Reading: Fun Way to Learn English (楽しく習得! 英語多読法) (Japanese language non-fiction). Japan: Chikuma Shobo, July 2016. ISBN 978-4-480-68960-3
- Sophisticated English Conversation for Adults (大人のための知識と教養の英会話) (Japanese language non-fiction). Japan: DHC, June 2014. ISBN 978-4-88724-553-2
- Quotes from Literature (世界文学の名言) (English/Japanese language non-fiction). Japan: IBC Publishing, May 2014. ISBN 978-4-79460-279-4
- What to Say in English at Times Like This (こんなとき英語ではこう言います) (Japanese language non-fiction). Japan: CosmoPier Publishing, February 2013. ISBN 978-4-86454-027-8
- Sophisticated English Conversation for Non-Native Speakers (日本人のための教養ある英会話) (Japanese language non-fiction). Japan: DHC, June 2012. ISBN 978-4-88724-527-3
- Reincarnates: Die without Sin (健太、斧を取れ！) (Japanese language fantasy novel). Japan: Gentosha, November 2010. ISBN 978-4-344-01911-9
- First Time in London (初めてのロンドン – イギリス英会話入門 ) (Hungul language non-fiction). South Korea: Vitamin Book, September 2010. ISBN 978-89-92683-35-7
- Great Britain in the 21st Century (English language university textbook). Japan: Nan'Undo, January 2009. ISBN 978-4-523-17612-1
- British English Listening (ゆっくりだから聞きとれる！イギリス英語のリスニング) (Chinese language non-fiction). Taiwan: Jong Wen Books, September 2007. ISBN 978-957-532-358-5
- Reading Your Way to English Comprehension (英語は多読が一番!) (Japanese language non-fiction). Japan: Chikuma Shobo, December 2008. ISBN 978-4-480-68799-9
- Selected Essays from Harry Potter and Mysterious Britain (イギリス英語で聞く「ハリー・ポッターと不思議の国イギリス」) (Japanese language non-fiction). Japan: CosmoPier Publishing, July 2008. ISBN 978-4-902091-61-8
- Harry Potter and Mysterious Britain (ハリー・ポッターと不思議の国イギリス) (Japanese language non-fiction). Japan: CosmoPier Publishing, June 2008. ISBN 978-4-902091-58-8
- Knowledgeable and Intellectual English Conversation (知識と教養の英会話) (Japanese language non-fiction). Japan: DHC, June 2008. ISBN 978-4-88724-475-7
- Reading Harry Potter Vol. 7 in the Original English (「ハリー・ポッター」第7巻が英語で楽しく読める本) (Japanese language non-fiction). Japan: CosmoPier Publishing, November 2007. ISBN 978-4-902091-53-3
- British English Listening (ゆっくりだから聞きとれる！イギリス英語のリスニング) (Japanese language non-fiction). Japan: DHC, September 2007. ISBN 978-4-88724-453-5
- The Complete Book of Writing (ライティング･パートナー) (Japanese language non-fiction). Japan: CosmoPier Publishing, February 2007. ISBN 978-4-902091-47-2
- First Time in London (初めてのロンドン – イギリス英会話入門 ) (Chinese language non-fiction). Taiwan: Jong Wen Books, November 2008. ISBN 957-532-316-5
- An Introduction to English Conversation (英会話の勉強の仕方) (Japanese language non-fiction). Japan: Kenkyusha, June 2006. ISBN 4-327-44086-8
- Reading Harry Potter Vol. 6 in the Original English (「ハリー・ポッター」第6巻が英語で楽しく読める本) (Japanese language non-fiction). Japan: CosmoPier Publishing, October 2005. ISBN 4-902091-36-4
- English Phrases in Japanese (この英語、日本語ではこういう意味) (Japanese language non-fiction). Japan: CosmoPier Publishing, April 2005. ISBN 4-902091-28-3
- First Time in London (初めてのロンドン – イギリス英会話入門 ) (Japanese language non-fiction). Japan: Kenkyusha, April 2005. ISBN 4-327-44083-3
- Japanese Phrases in English (この日本語、英語ではこう言うの) (Japanese language non-fiction). Japan: CosmoPier Publishing, March 2005. ISBN 4-902091-27-5
- Spoken British English—Basic Course (イギリス英語教本 – ベーシック･コース) (Japanese language non-fiction). Japan: Kenkyusha, October 2004. ISBN 4-327-44082-5
- Reading the Harry Potter Series in the Original English (Special Revised Edition) (「ハリー・ポッター」が英語で楽しく読める本＜増補改訂版＞) (Japanese language non-fiction). Japan: CosmoPier Publishing, July 2004.
- Reading Harry Potter Vol. 4 in the Original English (「ハリー・ポッター」第4巻が英語で楽しく読める本) (Japanese language non-fiction). Japan: CosmoPier Publishing, May 2004. ISBN 4-902091-14-3
- British Humour (イギリス人に学べ！英語のジョーク) (Japanese language non-fiction). Japan: Kenkyusha, April 2004. ISBN 4-327-45175-4
- Reading Harry Potter Vol. 3 in the Original English (「ハリー・ポッター」第3巻が英語で楽しく読める本) (Japanese language non-fiction). Japan: CosmoPier Publishing, March 2004. ISBN 4-902091-11-9
- Reading the Harry Potter Series in the Original English (「ハリー・ポッター」が英語で楽しく読める本) (Korean language non-fiction). South Korea: Darakwon Publishing, January 2004. ISBN 89-7255-871-0
- Reading Harry Potter Vol. 2 in the Original English (「ハリー・ポッター」第2巻が英語で楽しく読める本) (Japanese language non-fiction). Japan: CosmoPier Publishing, January 2004. ISBN 4-902091-09-7
- Reading Harry Potter Vol. 1 in the Original English (「ハリー・ポッター」第1巻が英語で楽しく読める本) (Japanese language non-fiction). Japan: CosmoPier Publishing, December 2003. ISBN 4-902091-08-9
- Reading Harry Potter Vol. 5 in the Original English (「ハリー・ポッター」第5巻が英語で楽しく読める本) (Japanese language non-fiction). Japan: CosmoPier Publishing, November 2003. ISBN 4-902091-07-0
- Reading the Harry Potter Series in the Original English (「ハリー・ポッター」が英語で楽しく読める本) (Japanese language non-fiction). Japan: CosmoPier Publishing, June 2003. ISBN 4-89023-140-4
- Business Translation Databook (ビジネス翻訳データブック) (Japanese language non-fiction reference book). Japan: DHC, May 2000. ISBN 4-88724-180-1
- Kokkyo Naki Hanzai (国境なき犯罪) (Japanese translation of Crime Sans Frontieres). Japan: DHC Publishing, June 1999. ISBN 4-88724-155-0

=== Foreign language (co-author) ===
- Yoichi Hareyama, co-author. Just Read the Story! Journal of a Businessman Day 31 to Day 60 (ストーリーを楽しむだけでいい! ビジネス英語奮闘記 31日目～60日目) (Japanese language non-fiction). Japan Sanshusha, 2020. ISBN 978-4384059687
- Yoichi Hareyama, co-author. Just Read the Story! Journal of a Businessman Day 1 to Day 30 (ストーリーを楽しむだけでいい! ビジネス英語奮闘記 1日目～30日目) (Japanese language non-fiction). Japan Sanshusha, 2019. ISBN 978-4384059670
- Yoichi Hareyama, co-author. Pocketbook Edition: Carefully Selected English Sentences for Business People (話したい人のための丸ごと覚える厳選英文100 ) (Japanese language non-fiction). Japan: Discover 21, 2014. ISBN 978-4-7993-1624-5
- Sally Kanbayashi, co-author. Reading Alice in Wonderland in English (やさしい英語で「不思議の国のアリス」を読もう) (Simplified abridgement of Lewis Carroll's Alice in Wonderland for non-native speakers). Japan: Kadokawa, 2014. ISBN 978-4-04-600187-0
- Yoichi Hareyama, co-author. Carefully Selected English Sentences for Business People (話したい人のための丸ごと覚える厳選英文100 ) (Japanese language non-fiction). Japan: Discover 21, 2013. ISBN 978-4-7993-1304-6
- Yoichi Hareyama, co-author. Nihonjin Nara Kanarazu Machigaeru Eigo (超キホンの日常会話なのに日本人なら必ず間違える英語) (Japanese language non-fiction). Japan: Daiwa Shobo, 2012.
- Yoichi Hareyama, co-author. Chohasso de Simple ni Tsutaeru Eikaiwa (超発想でシンプルに伝える英会話) (Japanese language non-fiction). Japan: Chukei Shuppan, 2011. ISBN 978-4-8061-4143-3
- Tatsuro Yoneyama, co-author. New TOEIC Super Training—Listening (新TOEICテストスーパートレーニング リスニング編) (Chinese language non-fiction). Taiwan: Jia-xi Books, 2010. ISBN 978-986-7293-89-3
- Naoyuki Naganuma, co-author. English Etymology Network (英単語 語源ネットワーク) (Japanese language non-fiction). Japan: CosmoPier Publishing, May 2010. ISBN 978-4-902091-81-6
- Yoichi Hareyama, co-author. English Language Techniques for Twitter (Twitter英語術) (Japanese language non-fiction). Japan: Jitsugyo-no-Nihonsha, 2010. ISBN 978-4-408-10845-2
- Tatsuro Yoneyama, co-author. New TOEIC Super Training—Listening (新TOEIC テストスーパートレーニング － リスニング編) (Chinese language non-fiction). Taiwan: Nonagon Culture, February 2010. ISBN 978-986-7293-89-3
- Yuichiro Yoshinari and Hitoshi Mitsuya, co-authors. STEP Examination Grade #2-Sub (23日完成－例文で覚える英検単語集－準2級) (Japanese language non-fiction). Japan: ASK. 2009. ISBN 978-4-87217-706-0
- Tomiko Yamakami, co-author. STEP Examination Grade #2 (23日完成－例文で覚える英検単語集－2級) (Japanese language non-fiction). Japan: ASK, 2009. ISBN 978-4-87217-705-3
- Tetsuya Kimura and Izumi Mizushima, co-authors. New TOEIC Super Training 555 (新TOEICテスト スーパートレーニング 実戦活用例文555) (Japanese language non-fiction). Japan: Kenkyusha, 2008. ISBN 978-4-327-43063-4
- Tatsuro Yoneyama, co-author. New TOEIC Super Training—Listening (新TOEIC テストスーパートレーニング － リスニング編) (Chinese language non-fiction). Taiwan: Royal Road Publishing, 2008. ISBN 978-4-327-43061-0
- Tetsuya Kimura and Izumi Mizushima, co-authors. New TOEIC Super Training—Grammar/Vocabulary (新TOEICテストスーパートレーニング 文法・語彙問題編) (Chinese language non-fiction). Taiwan: Royal Road Publishing, 2007. ISBN 978-986-6763-35-9
- Tatsuro Yoneyama, co-author. New TOEIC Super Training—Reading (新TOEICテストスーパートレーニング リーディング編) (Japanese language non-fiction). Japan: Kenkyusha, 2008. ISBN 978-4-327-43060-3
- Listening Strategies for the TOEIC Test (English language university textbook). Japan: ASK, 2008. ISBN 978-4-86312-052-5
- Yoichi Hareyama, co-author. 300 Sample Sentences Using 1,900 Indispensable Words (たったの300例文でこんなに身につく英単語 Must 1900) (Japanese language non-fiction). Japan: Asuka Publishing, 2007. ISBN 978-4-7569-1136-0
- Tetsuya Kimura and Izumi Mizushima, co-authors. New TOEIC Super Training—Grammar/Vocabulary (新TOEICテストスーパートレーニング 文法・語彙問題編) (Japanese language non-fiction). Japan: Kenkyusha, 2007. ISBN 978-4-327-43059-7
- Tatsuro Yoneyama, co-author. New TOEIC Super Training—Listening (新TOEICテストスーパートレーニング リスニング編) (Japanese language non-fiction). Japan: Kenkyusha, 2007. ISBN 978-4-327-43061-0
- Mikako Fujioka, co-author. TOEIC Test-2400 Vocabulary (TOEIC Test – 速効英単語2400) (Japanese language non-fiction). Japan: Kodansha, 2006. ISBN 4-7700-4061-X
- Yoichi Hareyama, co-author. Snowball's Adventure (スノーボールの冒険) (Japanese language fiction). Japan: Gentosha, 2006. ISBN 4-344-01231-3
- Noriko Hirota, co-author. The Unchanging Face of Great Britain (English language university textbook). Japan: Kinseido, 2005. ISBN 4-7647-3797-3
- Yoichi Hareyama, co-author. Business English (ビジネス英語の教科書) (Japanese language non-fiction). Japan: Mikasa Shobo Publishing, 2004. ISBN 4-408-10590-2
- Yoichi Hareyama, co-author. English Sense—Learning from a Native Speaker (英語のセンス – ネイティブに学ぶ英語術) (Japanese language non-fiction). Japan: Kawade Shobo, 2004. ISBN 4-309-90563-3
- Yoichi Hareyama, co-author. Improving Your English with a 2-Line Diary (｢2行日記｣で英語がカンタンにうまくなる！) (Japanese language non-fiction). Japan: Mikasa Shobo Publishing, 2004. ISBN 4-8379-6225-4
- Yoichi Hareyama, co-author. TOEIC Test—Big Bang Vocabulary Learning Method (TOEICテスト英単語ビッグバン速習法) (Japanese language non-fiction). Japan: PHP Bunko, 2003. ISBN 4-569-66073-8
- Yoichi Hareyama, co-author. Minute English Conversation (1分間「英会話」BOOK) (Japanese language non-fiction). Japan: Mikasa Shobo Publishing, 2003. ISBN 4-8379-6208-4
- Yoichi Hareyama, co-author. English Conversation Based on 5 Sentence Patterns (5文型で話せる音読英会話) (Japanese language non-fiction). Japan: Seishun Publishing, 2003. ISBN 4-413-03423-6

=== Newspaper/magazine contributions ===
- "Novels & Mysteries," serialization of a mystery novel. Asahi Weekly: July 2022 – September 2022.
- "Tote Bags & Diamonds," serialization of a humorous suspense novel. Asahi Weekly: October 2021 – December 2021.
- "The Morrison Darts," serialization of a humorous novel. Asahi Weekly: January 2021 – March 2021.
- "The Farmhouse on Windy Hill," serialization of a mystery novel. Asahi Weekly: October 2017 – March 2018.
- "Greyhurst Manor and the Swiss Connection," serialization of a mystery novel. Asahi Weekly: October 2016 – March 2017.
- "The Greyhurst Legend," serialization of a mystery novel (sequel to Greyhurst Manor). Asahi Weekly: October 2015 – March 2016.
- "Greyhurst Manor," serialization of a mystery novel. Asahi Weekly: October 2014 – March 2015.
- "Halcombe Lighthouse," serialization of a mystery novel. Asahi Weekly: October 2013 – March 2014.
- "A Crisis for Burdock Farm," serialization of a fantasy novel. Asahi Weekly: April 2012 – March 2013.
- "Roland Vance," serialization of the Roland Vance series of private investigator stories. Asahi Weekly: April 2011 – March 2012.
- "Mystery in the Mountains," serialization of mystery novel. Asahi Weekly: January – March 2011.
- "Ryoma-den" (竜馬伝), regular column on the life and times of Sakamoto Ryōma, a tie-in with NHK's TV drama. Tacho-Tadoku Magazine (Cosmopier): March – December 2010.
- "Treasure in the Mountains," serialization of mystery novel. Asahi Weekly: April – December 2010.
- "Happy Reading," monthly column providing advice on reading specific genres of English-language fiction. Asahi Weekly: April 2009 – March 2010.
- "Bestseller wa Omoshiroi," regular column on reading specific novels (notably best-sellers) in the original English. Tacho-Tadoku Magazine (CosmoPier): October 2006 – August 2110.
- "Gateway to Hell," serialization of fantasy-horror novel. Tacho-Tadoku Magazine (CosmoPier): March 2009 – January 2010.
- Multiple one-off articles.

=== Translated works ===
Predominantly non-fiction works on art, design, architecture, politics and Japanese culture, but also official translator of Yuka Shimada's bestselling "Bam and Kero" series for children.

=== Miscellaneous ===
Belton acts as a freelance proofreader/editor for the Japanese translations of overseas literature. He has been involved in the publication of approximately 70 translated works, including the works of Peter Carey, Arundhati Roy, Barbara Kingsolver, Amy Sohn, etc.

In addition to writing textbooks for use in universities, Belton has also contributed essays for use in the Crown Plus English Series (Level 2), a textbook for English study on the National Curriculum for junior high schools in Japan.

== Personal life ==
Belton is married to Michiyo (née Kato, b. 24 June 1951), with whom he has two sons: Shane (b. 25 May 1976) and Jamie (b. 4 February 1980). He currently lives in Yokohama, Japan.
