= Dead Sea (disambiguation) =

The Dead Sea is a landlocked salt lake bordered by Jordan to the east, the West Bank to the west and Israel to the southwest.

Dead Sea may also refer to:

- Dead Sea (film), a 2024 American crime horror film written and directed by Phil Volken
- Dead Sea (novel), a 2007 novel by Brian Keene
