= The Conqueror Worm (disambiguation) =

"The Conqueror Worm" is an 1843 poem by Edgar Allan Poe. It may also refer to:

- Witchfinder General (film), 1968 film retitled The Conqueror Worm for its United States release
- The Conqueror Worm (comics), 2001 Hellboy mini-series
- The Conqueror Worms, 2006 novel by Brian Keene
