= Parris Afton Bonds =

American historical romance author

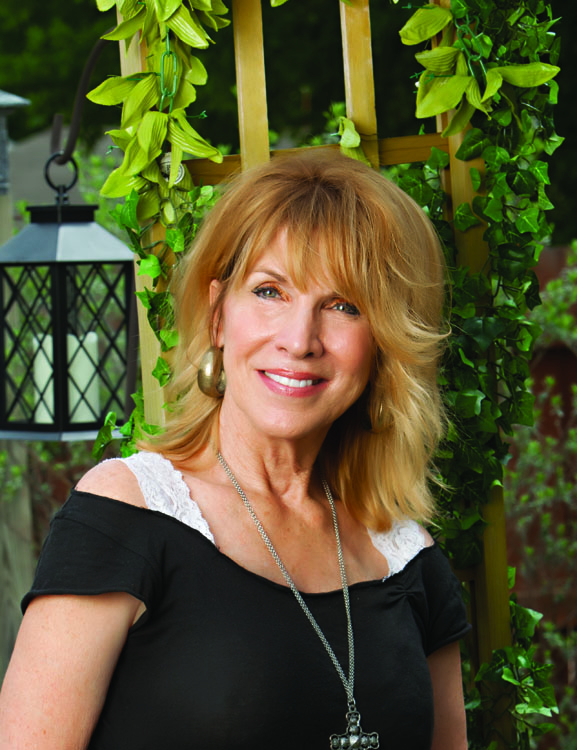
- Parris Afton Bonds
- Born: Parris Afton Bonds; Tampa, Florida, United States
- Occupations: Writer, novelist
- Writing career
- Period: 1972–present
- Genres: Romance; Historical romance
- Website: parrisaftonbonds.com

Parris Afton Bonds is an American historical romantic fiction novelist. She is the co-founder of Romance Writers of America.

Bonds started her professional writing career in the early 1970s with her first sale to Modern Secretary magazine, and in 1981 Time magazine called Bonds one of the many women who supplement their family income by writing romance novels. Her predominant genre is historical romance, but her works include other genres such as westerns, murder mysteries, sagas, and international thrillers. Bonds is a regular on bestseller lists and has been published in more than a dozen languages. ABC's Nightline heralded her as one of the three bestselling authors of romantic fiction in America.

She co-founded both Romance Writers of America, of which she was the first Vice President, and Southwest Writers Workshop. The Parris Award was established in her name by the Southwest Writers Workshop to honor published writers who give outstandingly of their time and talent to other writers. She has donated her time, teaching creative writing to female inmates and school children, both of whom she considers her captive audiences.

Bonds is named after Paris, Kentucky, where she was conceived, and the River Afton in Scotland. She was born in Tampa, Florida, and grew up in Oak Cliff, outside Dallas, Texas. Legendary Locals of Oak Cliff features Bonds in its chapter, "Creative Legends and Locals."

She is the author of more than fifty books and the mother of five sons, two of whom were born In Mexico City, where she lived in the early 1970s. Currently, she resides in Querétaro, Mexico. Writers who influenced Bonds early on were Dorothy Dunnett, Rafael Sabatini, Sergeanne Golan, Frank Yerby, Daphne du Maurier, Samuel Shellabarger, Jan Westcott, and Edna Ferber.

== Works ==
A list of some of the works by Parris Afton Bonds.

=== Books ===
- Blue Bayou - 1986 / (Fawcett) / ISBN 0-44-912607-2
- Blue Moon - 1985 / (Ballantine) / ISBN 0-44-990154-8
- The Calling of the Clan - 2016 / (Paradise Publishing) / ASIN B01N660FWI
- The Captive - 2013 / (Paradise Publishing) / ASIN B00GQ0BN22
- Dancing with Crazy Woman - 2013 / (Paradise Publishing) / ASIN B00C2C1RNI
- Dancing with Wild Woman - 2013 / (Paradise Publishing) / ASIN B007C7WOPI
- Deep Purple - 1984 / (Fawcett) / ISBN 0-58-606633-0
- Dream Keeper - 2014 / (Paradise Publishing) / ASIN B00KC52J4S
- Dream Time - 2014 / (Paradise Publishing) / ASIN B00K8O8FKU
- Dust Devil - 2013 / (Paradise Publishing) / ASIN B00C53PH76
- The Flash Of The Firefly - 2013 / (Paradise Publishing) / ASIN B00CWI33O8
- For All Time - 1992 / (HarperCollins) / ISBN 0-06-108012-8
- Indian Affairs - 2013 / (Paradise Publishing) / ASIN B008JLF4U8
- Kingdom Come: Temptation - 2013 / (Paradise Publishing) / ASIN B00H9VCJG6
- Kingdom Come: Trespass - 2015 / (Paradise Publishing) / ASIN B00S8G0WWO
- Lavender Blue - 1983 / (Paradise Publishing) / ASIN B00GLEXN58
- Love Tide - 1980 / (Popular Library) / ISBN 0-44-504521-3
- Made For Each Other - 2013 / (Paradise Publishing) / ASIN B007Y0694U
- Man For Hire: Book II - Midsummer Madness Trilogy - 2013 / (Paradise Publishing) / ASIN B00LVI15HW
- Midsummer Midnight - October 1985 / (HarperCollins) / ISBN 0-37-307113-2
- Mood Indigo - 1988 / (Fawcett) / ISBN 0-44-990134-3
- No Telling - 2014 / (Paradise Publishing) / ASIN B00OFHDSG2
- Renegade Man - 2013 / (Paradise Publishing) / ASIN B007Y0688M
- Run To Me - 2013 / (Paradise Publishing) / ASIN B007QEA8FK
- Savage Enchantment - 1979 / (Popular Library) / ISBN 0-445-04332-6
- The Savage - 1995 / (Dorchester) / ISBN 0-8439-3784-X
- Snow And Ice - 1987 / (Paradise Publishing) / ASIN B00RSIDPNG
- Spinster's Song - 1992 / (Leisure Books) / ISBN 0-84-393316-X
- Stardust - 1983 / (Paradise Publishing) / ASIN B00T5IW006
- Sweet Enchantress - 2013 / (Paradise Publishing) / ASIN B00HIR06X4
- Sweet Golden Sun - 1978 / (Popular Library) / ISBN 0-44-504226-5
- The Wildest Heart - 2014 / (Paradise Publishing) / ASIN B00NKQ9VCY
- Wanted Woman - 1987 / (HarperCollins) / ISBN 0-37-307189-2
- Widow Woman - 2013 / (Paradise Publishing) / ASIN B007SXUT80
- Wind Song - 2013 / (Paradise Publishing) / ASIN B007R8UUGW

=== Novellas and anthologies ===
- "Written in the Stars" in Valentine Sampler - Anthology|Valentine Sampler - 1993 / (Leisure Books) / ISBN 0-84-393378-X
- "Ravished!" in Silhouette Summer Sizzlers - Anthology|Silhouette Summer Sizzlers - 1989 / (HarperCollins) / ISBN 0-37-348217-5
- "At First Sight: A Novella" - 2017 / (Paradise Publishing) / ASIN B06XTHWC4V
- "The Latest and the Greatest" - 2014 / (Paradise Publishing) / ASIN B00OMENP66
