= Time Jumper =

1980 novel by William Greenleaf

- First edition
- Author: William Greenleaf
- Language: English
- Publisher: Leisure Books
- Publication date: 1980

Time Jumper is a science fiction novel by American writer William Greenleaf, published in 1980 by Leisure Books.

== Plot summary ==
Greenleaf's first novel, Time Jumper, is a coming-of-age novel set in Earth's distant future. The story revolves around two contrasting characters: a dwarf named Erin and an adolescent boy named Randi. Erin lives in a city sealed beneath a protective shield, where everything is artificially engineered, even the birds in the trees. The citizens isolate themselves in their crystal towers, caring only about wealth and status. In stark contrast, Randi lives with his tribe in a much different and more primitive environment: the wilderness outside the domed city.

Erin is a loner and something of a freak in a society which values perfection. He wants more out of life and spends his time secretly working on his passion, a time-traveling machine like the one built thousands of years ago by the legendary Joc-Sindor. However, Joc-Sindor's attempt to jump through time failed catastrophically, killing thousands and obliterating an area of the city now known as the Black Plain. Erin's task is to find the piece of the puzzle that Joc-Sindor missed and avoid making the same mistake.

The story begins when Erin receives a message telling him that the solution to his problem lies in the city's library, a forgotten room hidden in the cavern beneath the city. Books are no longer produced, for nobody reads them. Erin's discovery of a book containing Joc-Sindor's handwritten notes sets off a series of mysterious and frightening events. It appears that someone has taken an interest in Erin's secret development of the time jumper, but whether this individual wants him to fail or succeed is not clear. In the process of pursuing answers, Erin learns surprising truths about his heritage, Joc-Sindor, and the priesthood that rules the city.

Meanwhile, in his village beyond the city's shield, Randi wonders about the giant golden bubble and the city inside it, known as Chalmarene, or "place of death". Years ago, his brother died when he dared to touch the surface of the impenetrable shield. Despite the rules in his village discouraging any interest in the bubble, which has existed unchanging for as long as his people can remember, Randi becomes determined to enter it somehow.

In the end, Erin becomes the captive of a rogue priest seeking to sabotage the time jumper in his bid for power and revenge. Intending to kill Erin, the priest leads him through a hidden passageway to the outside, and for the first time, Erin sees the wilderness beyond the shield. By chance, Randi comes upon them while visiting the bubble, accompanied by his dog. The dog—the first real animal Erin has ever seen—attacks the priest, saving Erin's life. Erin and Randi then become unwitting ambassadors for their two cultures, and they embark on an effort to prepare their people for future encounters.
