= Ghoul (novel) =

2007 novel by Brian Keene

- First edition
- Author: Brian Keene
- Cover artist: Dave Kendall
- Language: English
- Genre: Horror novel
- Publisher: Leisure Books
- Publication date: 2007
- Publication place: United States
- Media type: Print (Hardback & Paperback)

Ghoul is a horror novel by Brian Keene, first published in 2007. The novel follows three young boys during summer vacation as they learn that a ghoul is threatening the peace of their town. It has been published in both English and German and Ghoul was adapted into a television film that aired in 2012 on Chiller.

== Plot summary ==
The novel follows Timmy, Barry, and Doug, three friends looking forward to summer vacation. They initially spend their time playing in the cemetery where Barry's father Clark works as a caretaker, unaware that it houses a ghoul. Clark has been hiding the ghoul's murders and even kidnaps a woman to serve as its sexual partner. As the murders and disappearances continue the town grows suspicious, particularly after some local boys go missing.

The boys investigate the events and grow suspicious of Clark. Barry and Doug also bond over revelations that each is being abused by a parent; Doug experiencing sexual abuse from his mother while Barry is physically abused by Clark. While trying to escape his mother's abuse by going to a friend's house, Doug discovers Clark with the ghoul. He is then kidnapped and taken to the ghoul's underground lair.

Barry and Timmy stage a rescue attempt that ends with the gruesome discovery that the ghoul has killed Doug. They also find the kidnapped woman, who they free. In the ensuing struggle Clark is crushed by dirt falling from a backhoe and the ghoul melts in the sunlight due to it pursuing the fleeing woman and Barry.

In the epilogue, occurring twenty years later, Timmy's father is being buried in the cemetery and Barry is the caretaker. Barry's son has bruises consistent with abuse, and Timmy realizes the ghoul was not the only monster in the cemetery.

== Development ==
Of the novel, Keene has stated that he drew upon his own childhood experiences, telling the Huffington Post that "Ghoul was what my world looked like, growing up in the late-seventies and early-eighties, and what I thought it looked like. A lot of my personal experiences went into it. It wasn’t just Timmy’s coming of age story. It was mine."

== Release ==
Ghoul was first published in paperback in the United States in 2007 through Leisure Press, an imprint of Dorchester Publishing. A hardcover special edition was released the same year through Delirium Books. It was republished in 2012 through Deadite Press and was released in German the following year through Borsdorf bei Leipzig Festa Verlag.

== Reception ==
Cemetery Dance reviewed the novel in 2019, writing that "Brian Keene took me on a journey with Ghoul, and it was visceral and painful and emotional and I’ll never forget it." HorrorNews.net also praised the book.

== Film adaptation ==
Keene received an offer to adapt Ghoul into a film around 2009, which he accepted. Gregory Wilson was named as the film director and William M. Miller, the writer of Headspace, was brought on to adapt the novel. Nolan Gould was brought on to portray the character of Timmy; prior to this Keene had thought Gould would be a good fit for the role after watching him on Modern Family. Jacob Bila, Trevor Harker, Catherine Mary Stewart, and Barry Corbin were also brought on as actors. Filming took place in Baton Rouge, Louisiana in 2011 and utilized the same sound stage as True Blood and Battle: Los Angeles.

Ghoul was released to Chiller in 2012 and was released to home video on January 8 of the following year. The movie received reviews from Cinema Crazed and HorrorNews.net, the latter of which noted that it was "very much in the Stephen King tradition of horror tales centred around children" but that "several things conspire against it being a success: a very poor period sense, a script that apes the mechanics of a King story without the richness, and a central narrative that doesn’t stand up to scrutiny."
