= Dead Sea (novel) =

2007 novel by Brian Keene

- First edition
- Author: Brian Keene
- Cover artist: Dave Kendall
- Language: English
- Genre: Horror novel
- Publisher: Delirium Books
- Publication date: 2007
- Publication place: United States
- Media type: Print (hardback & paperback)
- Preceded by: Ghoul
- Followed by: Tequila's Sunrise

Dead Sea is a horror novel featuring zombies by Brian Keene, first published in 2007. It is not set in the same world as The Rising.

== Plot ==
The streets of the city are no longer safe. They are filled with zombies - the living dead, rotting predators driven only by a need to kill and eat. For Lamar Reed and a handful of others, their safe haven is an old ship out at sea. But it will soon become a deathtrap, and they'll learn that isolation can also mean no escape.

== Reviews ==
A review in Publishers Weekly states, "With another bleak vision of the zombie apocalypse, Keene makes a triumphant return to the still-thriving subgenre he helped revive with his 2004 debut The Rising [..] Delivering enough shudders and gore to satisfy any fan of the genre, Keene proves he's still a lead player in the zombie horror cavalcade."

Dark Scribe Magazine's review of the book states, "Brian Keene consistently pumps out high-quality works of horror in both the small press and the mass market. While Dead Sea may not be as groundbreaking or as original as his previous works, it is still just as gripping and fast-paced a read as anything else he has written. If you’re a die-hard fan of zombies or just like your horror tales with lots of action, Keene has another treat in store for you."
