= Shamrock Alley =

2009 novel by Ronald Malfi

- Author: Ronald Malfi
- Language: English
- Genre: Crime fiction
- Publisher: Medallion Press
- Publication date: September 2009
- Publication place: United States
- Media type: Print (Hardback & ebook)
- Pages: 467
- ISBN: 978-1933836942 (first hardcover edition)
- Preceded by: Passenger
- Followed by: Snow

Shamrock Alley is a crime novel written by American novelist Ronald Malfi. It was originally published in 2009 by Medallion Press. The novel is based on a real-life investigation Malfi's father, a retired Secret Service agent, had worked back in the 1970s against The Westies. This is also the final novel where the author used his middle name on the cover and title page. The novel won a Silver Independent Publisher Book Awards medal (IPPY) for Best Mystery/Suspense/Thriller.

== Synopsis ==
Following an influx of counterfeit money, Secret Service agent John Mavio goes undercover with an Irish gang known as the West Side Boys in Manhattan's Hell's Kitchen. Mavio's goal is to shut down the ring of organized crime and flush out the source of the counterfeit money, an operation that is perhaps the worst in history. The gang is led by two Irish thugs from Hell's Kitchen, Mickey O’Shay and Jimmy Kahn. These two violent criminals have been terrorizing the Upper West Side for years, and are involved in more than just a counterfeit operation—the local police have been investigating them for many years in connection with countless unsolved homicides. O'Shay and Kahn have inflicted gruesome deaths on numerous victims by bludgeoning, stabbing, shooting, and cutting into pieces the bodies of those who got in their way or refused to cooperate with their treacherous schemes. This brutality has even earned them some fear from the Mafia.

Mavio's undercover role takes him deeper and deeper into the gruesome world of O'Shay, Kahn, and the rest of the West Side Boys. His life undercover is brutal and dangerous, and not only detrimental to his own well-being, but puts at risk the lives of Katie, his pregnant wife, and his dying father.

== Reception ==
The book received generally favorable reviews. BookReview.com called it "an interesting police procedural" while one Booklist reviewer stated, "This is a gripping thriller, similar to the novels of Gerald Petievich, the Secret Service agent turned author (To Live and Die in L.A. is his most well-known title), but with more emotional and moral depth. The author's previous books have garnered him acclaim and a small but devoted audience; this one could easily lift him into the mainstream." Author Lorenzo Carcaterra called the novel "a bottom-of-the-ninth, two-out, grand slam home run of a book."
