= Floating Staircase =

2011 novel by Ronald Malfi

- Author: Ronald Malfi
- Language: English
- Genre: Horror
- Publisher: Medallion Press
- Publication date: October 2011
- Publication place: United States
- Media type: Print (Hardback & Paperback)
- Pages: 492
- ISBN: 978-1-60542-436-1 (first paperback edition)
- Preceded by: Cradle Lake
- Followed by: The Narrows

Floating Staircase is a ghost story/mystery novel by American writer Ronald Malfi. It was published in 2011 by Medallion Press, with a limited edition hardcover collectors edition from Thunderstorm Books, which contained an original author's "Afterward" not in the paperback novel. The novel was nominated by the Horror Writers Association for a Bram Stoker Award for Best Novel, and it won a Gold IPPY Award for best horror novel of 2011.

== Synopsis ==
After the success of his latest novel, Travis Glasgow and his wife Jodie purchase their first home in the western Maryland town of Westlake, across the street from Travis' brother Adam and his family. Initially, life seems idyllic, with the picturesque lake behind the house and the rekindling friendship between Travis and Adam. Travis also begins to confront the darkness of his childhood and the guilt he's felt since his younger brother's drowning, which he blames himself for. However, the house's tranquility is short-lived. Strange noises disturb Travis' sleep, and his dreams are haunted by ghosts. Barely glimpsed shapes flit through the dimly lit hallways, but most perplexing is the mysterious set of wooden stairs emerging from the lake behind the house. As Travis investigates, he uncovers more about the Dentmans, the previous owners, and learns how young Elijah Denman drowned in the lake under circumstances strikingly similar to his brother's.

== Connections to other novels ==
The protagonist Travis Glasgow is also mentioned in Malfi's 2004 novel, The Fall of Never, although only peripherally, as the author of a novel titled Silent River. This is the name of one of Travis Glasgow's books as mentioned in Floating Staircase.

In Chapter 17 of Floating Staircase, Travis hallucinates a dream in which he believes he is "married to a woman with a monster growing in her belly, and my name was Alan, and we lived by our own special lake in a different part of the country." This is a direct reference to Alan Hammerstun, the protagonist in Malfi's novel Cradle Lake. In Cradle Lake, Alan Hammerstun has a similar dream where he believes he is Travis Glasgow, although Travis's name is not used in that text.

== Reception ==
The book received generally favorable reviews, with some reviewers touting it as "well-developed and unpredictable" and a "must-read novel." A reviewer for the New York Journal of Books stated, "Floating Staircase deserves to stand alongside a Stephen King or a Dean Koontz--at their best...[it is] a mature horror yarn, but, deep down, it is also an exploration of obsessions, and in particular the obsession it takes to be a writer." Publishers Weekly called the book's ending "surprising and expertly set up."
