= Steve Gerlach =

Australian thriller writer (born 1971)

Steve Gerlach (born 6 September 1971) is an Australian thriller writer. He currently lives in Melbourne, Victoria.

His works include numerous short stories and almost ten novels - eight of which have been published, or are soon to be published, in the United States.

== Bibliography ==
- The Nocturne (1999): Probable Cause Productions. Limited paperback edition. ISBN 0-9578641-0-8
  - (June 2009): Cargo Cult Press. Published as a 26-copy leather-bound hardcover and 150-copy limited hardcover.
- Love Lies Dying (2002): Probable Cause Productions. Limited paperback edition. ISBN 0-9578641-1-6
  - (December 2006): Bloodletting Press. Published as a 26-copy leather-bound hardcover and 300-copy limited hardcover. ISBN 978-0-9768531-5-2
- Rage (2003): Wild Roses Productions.
  - (January 2004): Bloodletting Press. Published as a 26-copy leather-bound hardcover and 300-copy limited hardcover. ISBN 0-9720859-2-0
  - (2004): Leisure Books. Published as a mass market paperback. ISBN 0-8439-5311-X
- Cell Candy (January 2004): Bloodletting Press. Published as a 300-copy limited softcover.
- Hunting Zoe (2004): Wild Roses Productions. Limited hardcover.
  - (March 2008): Bloodletting Press. Published as a 26-copy leather-bound hardcover and 300-copy limited hardcover. ISBN 978-1-935006-00-8
- Lake Mountain (August 2005): Bloodletting Press. Published as a 26-copy leather-bound hardcover and 400-copy limited hardcover. ISBN 0-9768531-0-8
- A Killer Stalks the Outback (2005) ASIN B000BQ2IG2
- Cloning Around (2005) ASIN B000BQ2IFS
- Amber Rising (March 2009): Cargo Cult Press. Published as a 135-copy limited softcover.
- Injustice (March 2009): Cargo Cult Press. Published as a 26-copy leather-bound hardcover and 150-copy limited hardcover.
  - (Written in 1991. Unpublished until 2009.)
- Harmony Chokes (unreleased)
- A Thousand Mettle Folds - Cut I: The Fall
- Within His Reach - Tasmaniac Publications
- Autopsy I, II and III - Three part series published through Legumeman Books in Australia.

== Other work ==
Steve Gerlach was the editor of In Laymon's Terms

Steve Gerlach was the historical advisor to the Australian film Let's Get Skase.
