= The Narrows (Malfi novel) =

2012 novel by Ronald Malfi

- First edition
- Author: Ronald Malfi
- Language: English
- Genre: Horror
- Publisher: Samhain Publishing
- Publication date: 2012
- Publication place: United States
- Media type: Print (Paperback)
- Pages: 401
- Preceded by: Floating Staircase
- Followed by: December Park

The Narrows is a horror novel by American writer Ronald Malfi. It was published in 2012 by Darkfuse Publications in a limited edition hardcover for collectors, then as a trade paperback and ebook with Samhain Publishing. In an interview, Malfi suggests the idea for the novel came from his interest in attempting to write a vampire novel that had no vampires in it: "I thought, What if I could write a vampire novel without vampires? What type of creature could take their place--a creature that, throughout history, may have given birth to the vampire legend? And that opened up the door to all these thoughts." The book contains three epigraphs from Bram Stoker's novel Dracula.

== Synopsis ==
The novel begins in the week before Halloween in the fictional western Maryland town of Stillwater in the days after a terrible flood has washed up the body of a hairless boy along the shores of the local culvert known as the Narrows. When two young boys, Matthew Crawly and Dwight Dandridge, go down to the Narrows to inspect the body of a dead deer, Matthew sees a figure he believes to be his estranged father up on the hill outside the town's abandoned plastics factory. That evening, Matthew is alerted to a figure out in his yard, whom he believes to be his father, but is really a vampire-like creature taking the form of his father. The creature takes Matthew away in the night.

Meanwhile, Maggie Quedentock is returning home late from an affair with her husband's friend when she strikes a pale, childlike creature with her car. Police arrive, to include Stillwater Police Sergeant Ben Journell, who find no trace of anyone having been struck by Maggie's car.

In the morning, Matthew's teenage sister Brandy awakes to find him missing and the back door of the house standing open. A search of the yard reveals Matthew's shirt with a series of strange holes running vertically down the back. When Matthew fails to show up that evening, Brandy's mother calls the police and reports Matthew missing.

That same evening, Maggie and her husband Evan get in a fight over the dent in Maggie's car. After Evan leaves for work on the night shift, Maggie catches a glimpse of the pale, childlike creature out in the yard. She tells her lover, Tom Schuler, to come over. Tom arrives, but before she can let him in the house, he is attacked and killed by the creature. The next morning, there is no sign of the creature. Maggie realizes she has to get rid of Tom's car before Evan gets home, so she drives it into town and abandons it.

Ben takes up the search for the Crawly boy, while simultaneously learning of instances of cattle mutilation that have occurred on local farms, where the animals appear partially digested by something akin to acid. At least one eyewitness claims to have glimpsed a pale figure outside at night. He learns from the local coroner that the body of the hairless boy who had washed up in the Narrows after the flood has mysteriously disappeared from the morgue.

Maggie is confronted by her husband about her affair after he finds Tom's cell phone in their yard. During their fight, Evan is attacked and killed by the childlike creature, who excretes digestive acid on him before devouring him. Maggie locks herself in the house again, with Evan's shotgun.

Brandy goes to Ben and tells him that she learned from Matthew's friend that Matthew had witnessed something strange at the old plastics factory the day he disappeared. Ben and Brandy go to the factory, where they find heaps of bat guano in what looks like an abandoned nest of sorts. When they return to Brandy's house, Brandy gives Ben the shirt with the holes down the back. Ben recognized the puncture marks in the shirt as the same marks that were on the hairless boy's back when they recovered the body from the banks of the Narrows. Meanwhile, Brandy hears a noise outside at night, and when she goes to see about it, she catches a glimpse of the pale, vampire-like creature Matthew had become, before he vanishes through the cornfield.

A second boy, Billy Leary, disappears under similar circumstances, while other people in Stillwater claim to have seen visages of their dead loved ones while others are attacked by pale, childlike creatures in the night. Billy's father, Bob Leary, hears a noise in his fireplace. He looks up the chimney to see his son there, surrounded by bats. Billy attacks and kills his father.

Maggie goes to her neighbors' for help, and the police are called. Ben shows up and Maggies says she hurt her husband. Ben takes Maggie to the station for questioning. Ben returns to the Quedentock house with another officer, where they find empty shotgun shells and blood but no bodies. Ben returns to the station to speak with Maggie, but gets a call that the Crawly boy's body was discovered in an abandoned house. They boy's body is recovered and brought to the police station during a thunderstorm. The roads are flooded and the coroner is unable to make it into town. Brandy meets up with Ben again and says that she doesn't believe her brother is actually dead, but that he's changed into a vampire-like creature. Ben doesn't believe her, and drives her back home. Meanwhile, at the police station, Matthew's body reanimates and kills Maggie and some police officers. Ben surveys the carnage when he returns, he finds Shirley, this dispatcher, hiding in a closet. Ben realizes that the recent bat infestation has something to do with what was going on, and if he could find the bats' new roost, since they'd vacated the plastics factory, he might find the cause of the problem. They had previously caught a bat, which they kept in a birdcage, and Ben straps a small vehicle tracker to it and sets it free, hoping it will lead him to the roost.

Ultimately, the bat leads Ben—as well as Brandy—to a disused grain silo in a deserted part of Stillwater. Inside the silo, the rafters are teeming with bats, which serve as concealment for a creature that is some parts amphibious, some parts insectile, and wholly alien. The pale, childlike creatures and being fed off the mother-creature by the mother's segmented tail, which inserts into a column of punctures along the spines of the boys. When Ben looks at the creature, he can see it reflect Ben's emotions on its own face, taking the appearance of Ben's beloved, deceased father. Ben attempts to burn the silo down, but as it collapses, the pale boys and the mother-creature try to escape. Ben shoots and kills the mother-creature.

In the epilogue, Brandy returns to the plastics factory to find her brother and the Leary boy turning back into normal children, while Ben leaves town, following the portable tracker, in search of the next bat infestation.

== Reception ==
The book received generally favorable reviews, with Publishers Weekly calling it a "smartly written novel [that] succeeds as both an allegory of smalltown life and a tale of visceral horror." Dreadful Tales suggested this is Malfi "at his best," while Shroud Magazine said, "the characters will stay with you, and the town will haunt you in this most memorable book."
