= Dark Hollow (novel) =

2006 horror novel by Brian Keene

- First Edition Cover
- Author: Brian Keene
- Original title: The Rutting Season
- Cover artist: Jeremy Caniglia
- Language: English
- Genre: Horror
- Publisher: Bloodletting Press
- Publication date: July 2006
- Publication place: United States
- Media type: Print (Paperback)
- Pages: 269
- ISBN: 0-9768531-2-4 First edition
- Preceded by: Kill Whitey
- Followed by: Ghost Walk

Dark Hollow is a 2006 horror novel (first published as The Rutting Season) written by Brian Keene. It tells the story of Adam Senft, a struggling writer who discovers that an evil satyr has been summoned by Nelson LeHorn, a local witch. The satyr is hypnotising and abducting women in Adam's local town in order to procreate with them. Adam must convince his friends and the police that the satyr is real in order to destroy it.

The story takes place in York County, Pennsylvania and is loosely based on Rehmeyer's Hollow, and Pennsylvania Dutch pow-wow.

== Plot summary ==
Adam Senft, a struggling writer, is out walking his dog in the forest behind his house when he hears pan pipes playing. Following the sound, he finds one of his neighbors, Shelly Carpenter, fellating the stone statue of a satyr which appears to change into a living creature. Unsure of what he's seen, Adam flees the forest.

At home, Adam and his wife Tara are struggling with their marriage after a miscarriage. When their neighbor Shannon Legerski disappears, her husband Paul is arrested as a suspect. As the police begin door-to-door investigations, Detective Ramirez questions Adam, and reveals that two more women have disappeared, including Shelly Carpenter. Adam lies about seeing Shelly with the satyr.

Adam goes to Shelly Carpenter's house and finds satyr hoof-prints in the garden outside. The police and fire service organize a search of the local forest, but the police dogs refuse to enter the forest. Adam and a group of men enter the forest, where they find another large hoof print and a stone with strange lettering carved into it.

The next morning, Tara claims she dreamed of a hairy man standing outside under their bedroom window and playing a flute. Adam finds hoofprints under the window. He confides in his friends who research on the internet about satyrs. That night, the satyr tries to hypnotize and abduct Tara and a neighbor, Claudine. Adam, Claudine's husband Dale, and their neighbors Merle and Cliff manage to drive the satyr off.

Adam thinks the satyr has something to do with Nelson LeHorn, a local farmer who was rumored to be a "black" Pow-wow witch. They leave their neighbor Cory to look after Tara and Claudine, then drive to the abandoned LeHorn farmhouse where they find Nelson's diaries, which explain how he summoned the satyr which impregnated his wife, whom he killed by throwing her from their attic window. The house is attacked by possessed trees. They escape from the house by setting fire to the trees which also starts a forest fire, but the trees have destroyed Merle's truck, forcing them to start walking home. By the time they get home, it has become night and the satyr has returned, hypnotized and abducted Tara and Claudine and killed Cory.

Adam, Dale, Cliff and Merle head into the forest, but are stopped by Detective Ramirez. They convince him and the police to help them, but are attacked by possessed trees. They find the satyr Hylinus engaged in an orgy with the abducted women, whom it has hypnotized. The satyr turns the hypnotized women on the men, while Adam's dog Big Steve attacks Hylinus, who kills it. Adam and the men manage to kill the satyr by using their belief in white magic. The forest fire destroys the remains of the satyr.

Months later, Tara is pregnant, and Adam discovers from an ultrasound scan that she is pregnant with a baby satyr. The novels ends with Adam contemplating that he has to go upstairs and do what needs to be done; kill his wife. He notes, wearily, "I am so tired."

== Film adaptation ==
Dark Hollow was optioned for film in 2009.

== Editions ==
- Trade Paperback (Bloodletting Press, Jul. 2006): OriginalThe title on the front cover is flat (non-embossed). 269 pages; ISBN 0976853124; Dimensions (inches): 8.8 x 6 x 0.8
- Mass Market Paperback (Leisure Books, Feb. 2008): The title on the front cover is raised (embossed). 305 pages; ISBN 0-8439-5861-8.
- Hardcover (SFBC, Jun. 2010): The title on the front cover is flat (non-embossed); ISBN 1616645555; Dimensions (inches): 7.9 x 5.8 x 1.5
- Mass Market Paperback (Deadite Press, Jun. 2012): The title on the front cover is raised (embossed). 290 pages; ISBN 1-62105030-0; Dimensions (inches): 8.4 x 5.4 x 0.8
