= William Greenleaf (American novelist) =

American sci-fi author (born 1948)

William Greenleaf (born August 9, 1948) is an American author. He was born in Illinois, spent most of his life in southern Arizona, and now lives in New Mexico near Santa Fe. He is a graduate of Arizona State University and worked as a corporate strategic and financial planner before changing careers to become a novelist, freelance book editor, and creative writing instructor.

== Published works ==
Although Greenleaf has ghostwritten novels in many genres, as well as a variety of non-fiction books, he is best known for the science fiction novels published under his own name. His novels are traditional science fiction with the common theme of the resilience of the human spirit and the ability of ordinary people, when threatened by extraordinary circumstances, to reach into themselves for the resources necessary to survive.

== Works ==
=== Novels ===
- Time Jumper (Leisure Books - 1980)
- The Tartarus Incident (Ace/Berkeley - 1983)
- The Pandora Stone (Ace/Berkeley - 1984)
- Starjacked! (Ace/Berkeley - 1987)
- Clarion (Tor Books - 1988)
- Bloodright (Mundania Press - 2011)

=== The Tartarus Incident ===
For his second novel The Tartarus Incident, Greenleaf developed a complex future environment in which the Earth-based United Nations Space Administration (UNSA) oversees space exploration and colonization efforts. Interstellar travel involves a co-ordinated series of "skips" through a physical realm known as the Kohlmann stream. This background scenario was used for several of Greenleaf's novels.

In The Tartarus Incident, arguably Greenleaf's best-known work, an UNSA audit ship called the jack-a-dandy vanishes during a routine jump through the K-stream to a planet called Sierra. The five accountants aboard find themselves stranded on an unfamiliar planet, with no way to communicate with their base vessel, Graywand. Forced to hunt for a solution themselves, they are woefully unprepared for the ship's malfunctions, the planet's withering heat and the mental pressures of being stranded in an alien wilderness.

Back on Graywand, commclerk Lars Clemens tries to determine what went wrong, persevering despite the bureaucratic incompetence of his superiors. He finally discovers that, due to a series of avoidable human errors, the jack-a-dandy has arrived on an unexplored planet known as Tartarus — another name for Hell.

Meanwhile, the crew of the jack-a-dandy face more bad news. Wandering from the ship, one of them has discovered an abandoned alien city and has disappeared into the catacombs beneath it. Realizing that he has taken with him an essential part of the ship's drive, the other crew members are forced to venture into the elaborate tomb in pursuit.

Lost in the pitch-dark maze of the tomb, the crew is hunted by terrifying creatures — mindless, cannibalistic descendants of the original builders of the city. Two crew members die in the panicked hours that follow, while a third sacrifices himself to spare the others just minutes before help arrives from UNSA.

=== The Pandora Stone ===
The 1984 novel The Pandora Stone is a complex novel involving a mysterious alien artifact and a powerful group of individuals who are determined to acquire it at all costs.

The story begins when the contract courier Arlo Field is assigned to acquire and transport a mysterious alien artifact to UNSA headquarters on the planet Sierra. Two hundred years ago, the artifact, a large crystal, was hidden on an undeveloped Fringe planet and UNSA wants to find out why. Soon, Field learns that Isterbrandt, a powerful criminal organization, is also desperate to obtain the crystal. If Isterbrandt succeeds, it will be able to control all of humanspace.

After he obtains the crystal, Field quickly finds himself under attack by corrupt UNSA guardsmen. He is aided by a young woman from Earth who claims that the alien artifact belongs to her. The two escape to Earth, which was abandoned centuries ago after a plague killed millions. Now, only a small population remains, known as the Sgor na Lyurr. The plague has left them with certain unique qualities, including a kind of telepathic link called the "pallaise".

The Sgor na Lyurr explain that the crystal came from the Nninjinti, an intelligent race who visited Earth long ago. Through a mechanism hidden on Earth, the Nninjinti opened up the K-stream, the pathway along which humans travel through space. If the Nninjinti crystal can be united with the mechanism, the story goes, the Nninjinti will return and grant humans access to the rest of the galaxy. However, the Sgor na Lyurr suspect that the Nninjinti may have ulterior motives. Their strange symbiotic relationship with humans' longtime adversaries — a terrifying alien race known as the "cobra" — suggests that the Nninjinti may intend to enslave humanity in the same way.

During a climactic confrontation with Isterbrandt forces, Field destroys the mechanism and the crystal, and possibly the Nninjinti themselves. He is aided by a lone cobra who has come to Earth to save its species from extinction. Although the destruction of the mechanism should have closed the K-stream and ended human space travel, they are surprised to find that it and the pallaise are one and the same. As a result, the K-stream is kept open, and the cobra have a chance at survival and peace with humanity.

=== Starjacked! ===
An underlying positive theme of Greenleaf's novels encompasses the ability of ordinary people, when faced with adversity, to reach inside themselves for the resources necessary to overcome it. This theme is an underlying element in Starjacked!, which explores the resilience and inner strength of children.

In Starjacked!, the reporter Leo Blannon and his streamer pilot, Erek Speros, follow a tip and discover the location of Copernicus, an UNSA starship hijacked by a rogue UNSA Guard captain and a band of Fringe outlaws. While trying to document their find, their streamer is captured by the much larger ship.

Aboard the ship, Blannon and Speros escape the guards with the help of young stowaways Gillie and Joby, orphaned children who take them to their hideout deep in the ship. Their first priority is to send a message to UNSA, alerting them to the location of Copernicus and requesting help. This difficult task becomes more complicated when they learn that the crew is preparing to skip to a new destination: the penal colony planet Kisatchie.

While guards search for them with orders to kill them on sight, the stowaways form a plan to stop the ship from skipping to Kisatchie before help can arrive. At the same time, Blannon works to uncover the dark motives behind the hijacking. In a confrontation with UNSA Captain Xavier Cassady, he learns that Cassady has a personal grudge to settle on Kisatchie. He intends to help the outlaws break their cohorts out of prison, but only so that he can destroy them and bring an end to the death and destruction they have wreaked among the Fringe planets.

In the final scenes, the stowaways, with the help of UNSA Guard officers, take control of the ship and halt the skip to Kisatchie. The leader of the outlaws, Victor Troy, tries to salvage his plan by stealing a ship called the Wasp and its load of 30 interstream missiles, the deadliest weapons known to man. Working together, Speros, Gillie and Cassady foil Troy's attempt, resulting in the destruction of the Wasp and ending Troy's reign over the Fringe. Captain Cassady gives his own life to ensure that Troy is defeated.

=== Clarion ===
In Clarion, Dorland Avery is a psi-player who uses his empathic powers to manipulate audiences' emotions onstage. One night after a performance, he is confronted by a man from the planet Clarion. Two hundred years ago, Clarion was settled by a group of colonists and then was lost when its co-ordinates were mysteriously erased from all navigation computers. Now the people of Clarion need Dorland's help. High Elder Brill, the leader of Clarion's tyrannical religious cult, has been using the revelations of an alien named Lord Tem as an excuse to commit terrible atrocities.

The narrator of the story, Dorland's business manager Paul, is shocked to learn that the reclusive Dorland was born on Clarion and was once in training for the eldership. His empathic skills and his history on Clarion may help the rebels discover the truth about Lord Tem and challenge Brill's power. Dorland has strong motives to accomplish this: his own parents, wife and daughter were executed by Brill as heretics.

Feeling that they have no other choice, Dorland and Paul travel to Clarion, where the only city sits on the edge of ancient ruins left by an intelligent species known as the Tal Tahir. Joining a small band of rebels, they sneak into Elder Brill's temple and see the terrifying Lord Tem with their own eyes — and feel its mind probing theirs. This encounter touches off their desperate effort to resolve the mystery of the Tal Tahir, while also evading Brill's loyal army of deacons.

Hidden in the alien ruins, the rebels discover another member of the Tal Tahir, Elli, whose gentle nature provides a sharp contrast to Lord Tem's. With Elli's compassionate guidance, Dorland finds a solution to the desperate situation on Clarion. In the climactic scene, Dorland, Paul and Elli together successfully turn the people against the elders, whose power is soon dismantled. In the end, Paul and the others realize that Elli and Lord Tem were not living beings, but rather interactive holograms designed by the Tal Tahir as entertainment. Sadly, the advanced technology that produced the characters is thousands of years old, and the Tal Tahir are long gone.

=== Bloodright ===
Bloodright is a departure from Greenleaf's earlier novels in that it takes place on present-day Earth, though it continues the theme that, when faced with extraordinary perils, ordinary people can reach into themselves for resources they didn’t know they possessed.

The story begins when a pair of aliens who call themselves Zeke and Simon arrive on Earth, landing their little red spaceship on a rural stretch of road in southern Arizona. The president sends his science advisor, Kathy Stratton, and chief of staff, Ray Corbett, to Arizona to find out who the aliens are and what they want. Stratton and Corbett offer a business proposal that, they claim, will bring untold riches to the people of Earth. According to Zeke and Simon, humankind is the only Blood species (sentience) in the Milky Way galaxy, and thus owns it. Every star, every planet, every pebble in the galaxy belongs to the people of earth. Other species will be wanting to colonize planets in the newly discovered galaxy, and they will have to pay for leasehold rights. Under the partnership proposal, Zeke and Simon will negotiate those deals and split the profits with the people of Earth.

Zeke and Simon do not look like aliens. They look like friendly, pudgy, five-foot-tall teddy bears. Making expert use of the extensive media coverage that descends on them, the "Teddies" launch an effective PR campaign that quickly brings public opinion to their side and puts pressure on the president to accept their offer.

Accompanying the Teddies is a small, monkey-like animal they call a durriken. They say it is a pet, but 15-year-old Nikki Jamison knows the odd little creature is far more than a pet. When she first caught sight of it shortly after Zeke and Simon landed their spaceship across the road from her house, she saw something in the durriken's eyes that dredged up long-buried emotions. Now she is desperate for another look at the durriken. She needs to know if what she saw in its strange eyes was real.

Oscar Villalobos, a former corporate lawyer who now works as a flunkie for a local news crew, was also shocked by what he saw in the durriken's small black eyes. He, too, is determined to have another look. He needs to know if what he saw was real or imagined. He needs to know if the durriken really did look deep into his past and dredge up emotions that were best left untouched.

While Corbett and Stratton deal with the antics of Zeke and Simon, as well as their own differences, and move closer to accepting the partnership proposal, Jamison and Villalobos slip unnoticed into the Teddies' spaceship. They soon learn that Zeke and Simon are not the friendly back-slappers they pretend to be. Trapped in a weird, impossibly vast labyrinth inside the ship, knowing their chances for survival are slim, they discover the truth about the aliens. They also learn about the complex network of interaction between sentient species throughout the universe, and the elegantly simple system of law that holds it together — and they learn that a partnership with Zeke and Simon will not bring riches to the human race, but extinction.
