= Wildlife Treasury =

Animal Encyclopedia

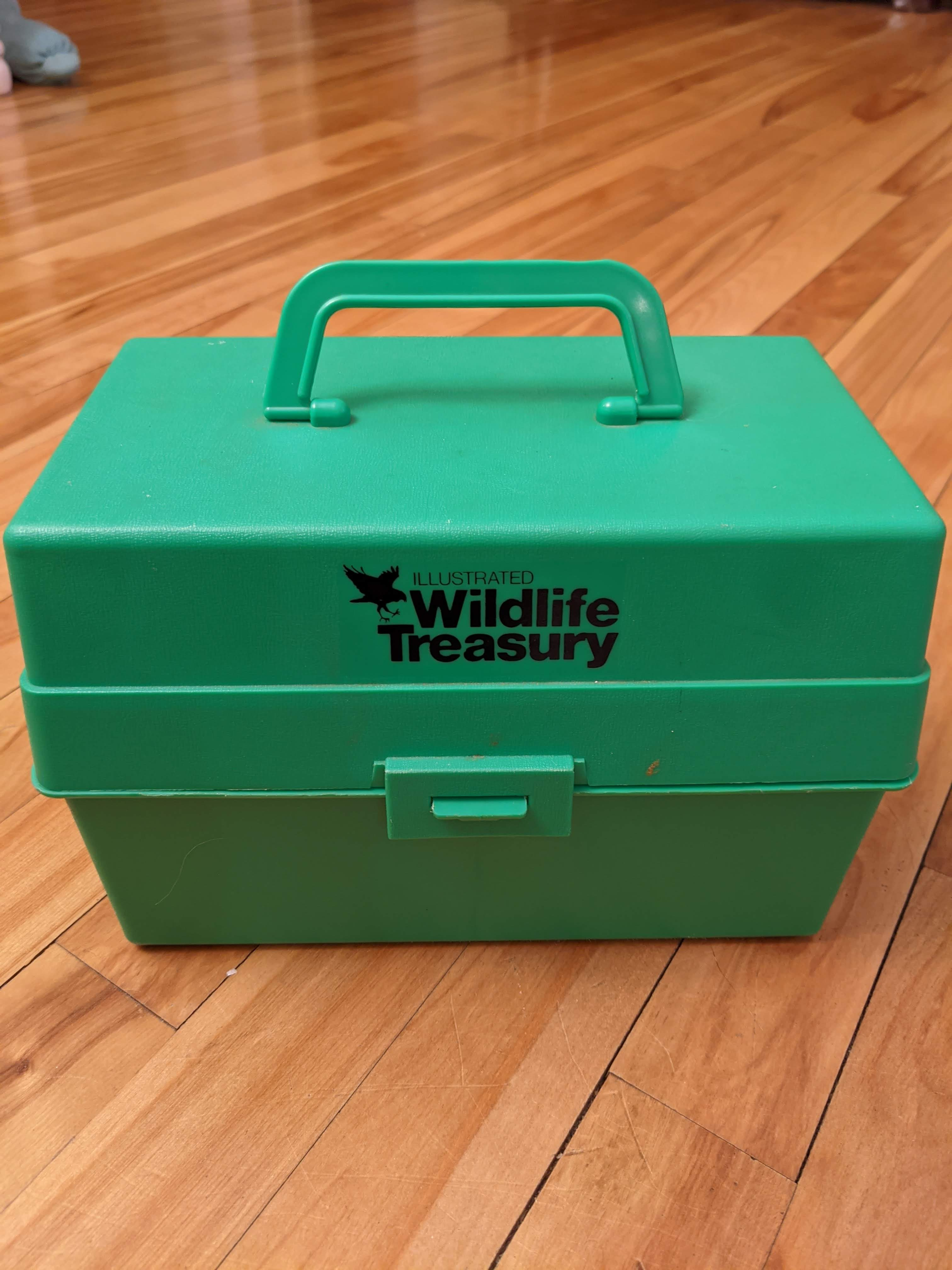
Illustrated Wildlife Treasury Card Set

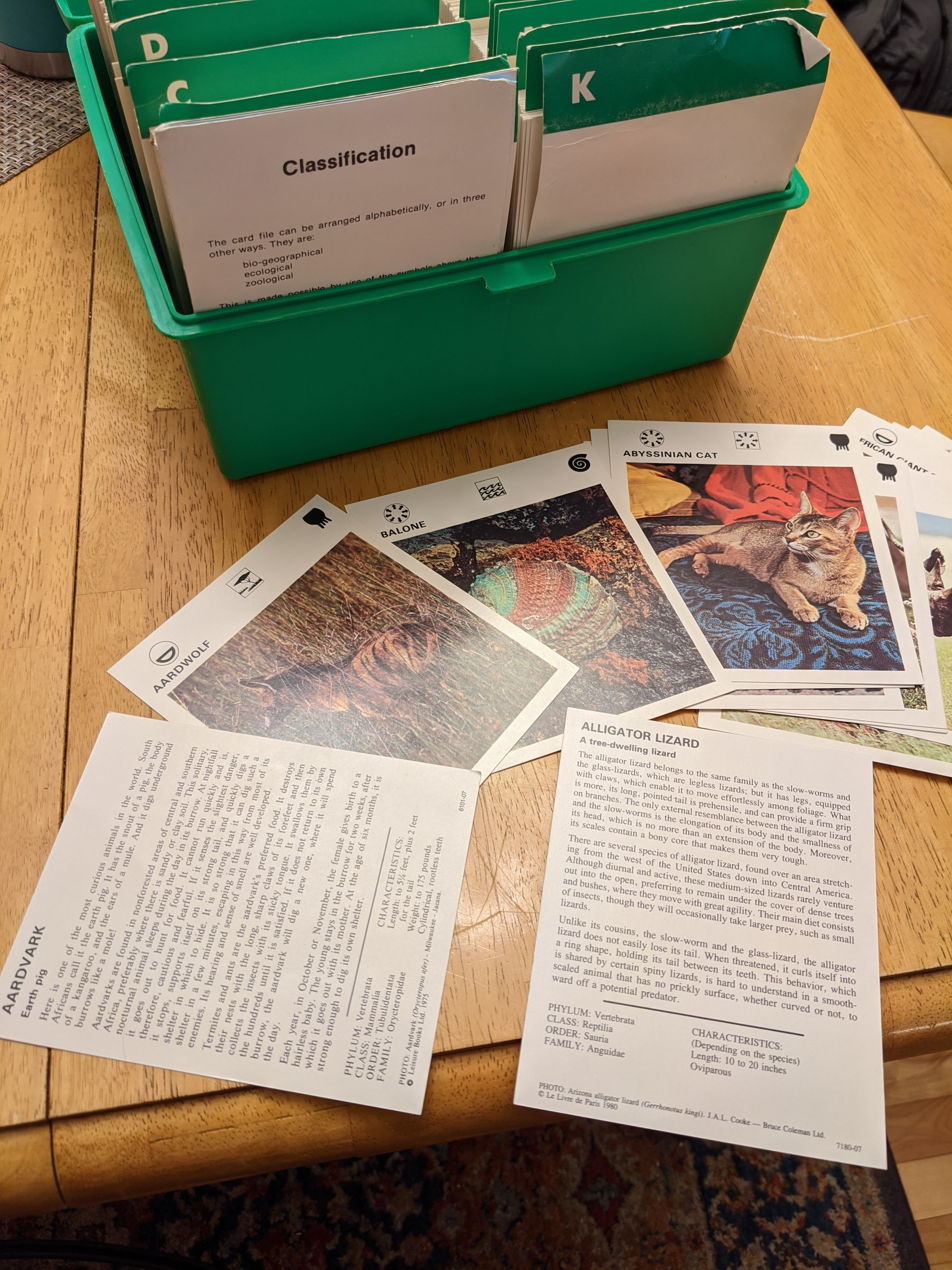
Illustrated Wildlife Treasury Cards, examples of front and back

Wildlife Treasury was an educational animal encyclopedia for young children published between 1975 and 1981 by Leisure Books.

== Description ==
The encyclopedia was released in a series of "Wildlife Cards" showing entries on specific animals, with over one thousand cards in all. The Wildlife cards were available through a monthly subscription, with the first set provided with a green plastic carrying case. The cards' themes were split into three categories: bio-geographical, ecological, and zoological.

The Wildlife Treasury Cards were mainly released in the United States, but a different version of the cards were also available in Canada. Canadian cards had rounded corners, to distinguish from the U.S. Cards, and were unnumbered. The card sizes, pictures, and write-ups were identical between U.S. and Canadian version. One version of the Canadian set had a box with a transparent plastic lid and no handle. It's not clear whether these were from the same company and just a library version.

== Commercial Advertisement ==
An often remembered trait of the "Wildlife Treasury" series was an advertisement featuring an excited young boy describing some of the cards in his wildlife collection. The Rhinoceros, Proboscis monkey, and Platypus are all discussed, at the end of which the young boy exclaims: "They're all in my Wildlife Treasury!!" The commercial ran on American television for several years in the 1980s, most significantly on Nickelodeon.
