= December Park =

2014 novel by Ronald Malfi

- Author: Ronald Malfi
- Language: English
- Genre: Thriller
- Publisher: Medallion Press
- Publication date: May 13, 2014
- Publication place: United States
- Media type: Print (hardback & paperback)
- Pages: 534 pp.
- ISBN: 978-1605425917 (first paperback edition)
- Preceded by: The Narrows
- Followed by: Little Girls

December Park is a coming of age/bildungsroman suspense novel written by Ronald Malfi. It was published in 2014 by Medallion Press, with a limited hardcover collectors edition from Cemetery Dance Publications. Malfi has credited this book with being his most autobiographical to date, citing that the fictional town of Harting Farms and its titular neighborhood park are based on the Maryland suburb of Severna Park, where Malfi grew up.

== Synopsis ==
The novel takes place over the course of one year, 1993-1994, and focuses on a group of friends growing up in a small bayside community called Harting Farms, Maryland, located on the shores of the Chesapeake Bay. The novel is narrated by 15-year-old Angelo "Angie" Mazzone, who relays the story of a child abductor and murderer who has been plaguing his hometown called the Pied Piper by local police. When the novel opens, Angie and his two best friends, Scott Steeple and Peter Galloway, witness local police extricating the body of a dead girl from the woods that surrounds December Park, a local suburban park. Later, they inform their friend Michael Sugarland of what they saw, and each boy is affected by the event in a different way. Later, Angie befriends his new neighbor and classmate, the awkward Adrian Gardiner, and introduces him to his circle of friends. When Adrian learns of the Piper and the girl found in the woods, he confesses that he recently discovered a heart-shaped locket near where the body was found which must have belonged to the girl. From there, the five friends make a pact, agreeing to continue searching for clues as to the identity of the Piper, who continues his abductions throughout the course of the novel.

== Inspiration ==
In an April 2014 interview with the Severna Park Voice Malfi said that the impetus for the novel began when he was attending Severna Park High School, with his intention being to write a horror novel that included his friends as main characters and many of the locations of his hometown of Severna Park as the backdrop. The book went through several drafts and title changes until, two decades later, it was published as a coming-of-age thriller. Malfi has often referred to the novel as a "fictionalized memoir with a serial killer subplot," and notes that the fictional town of Harting Farms is a derivative of the Arnold, Maryland neighborhood of Harting Farm. Names of local landmarks have been changed, with, for example, "Governor Highway" in the book replacing the real Governor Ritchie Highway and the "Generous Superstore" as a stand-in for the chain of grocery stores known as Giant Food of Maryland.

== Reception ==
The book received generally favorable reviews, with Booklist touting that "horror and crime fans will find much to like here" while Horror Novel Reviews called the novel "a consistently engaging read, and one that should have you turning the pages long into the night....a great book about childhood. Malfi's at the top of his game, and December Park is a must-have for horror readers. Highly recommended." Reader reviews were mixed, with some suggesting this was Malfi's strongest book to date while others complained about the languid pace of the novel and the fact that it did not involve any supernatural or horror genre elements.
