= Ronald Malfi =

American writer

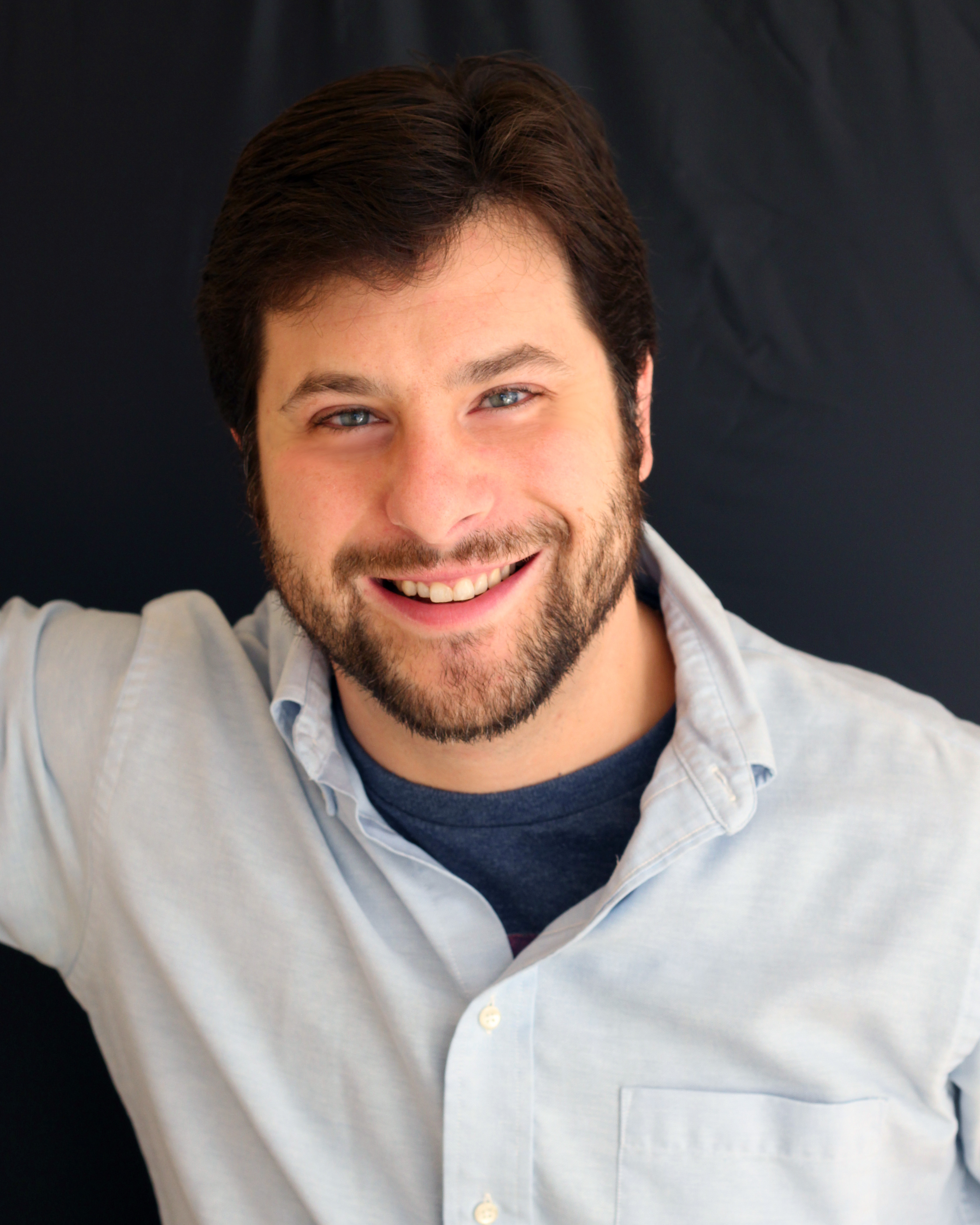
- Ronald Malfi in 2013
- Born: April 28, 1977 (age 49); Brooklyn, New York
- Occupations: Novelist; short story writer; screenwriter
- Writing career
- Genres: Horror fiction, mainstream fiction, crime fiction
- Literary movement: Speculative fiction
- Website: ronmalfi.com

Ronald Malfi (born April 28, 1977) is an American novelist whose genres include horror, thrillers, mainstream, and literary fiction. Malfi is also a musician, having fronted the Baltimore-based alternative rock band Nellie Blide as well as his current project, Veer. He currently lives in Maryland.

== Life and career ==
Ronald Malfi was born on April 28, 1977, in Brooklyn, New York. His father was a Secret Service agent and his mother was a stay-at-home mom, who eventually raised four children, of which Ronald was the eldest. His father's job saw the family transferred to various cities throughout the northeast until they eventually relocated to Severna Park, Maryland, where Ronald attended Severna Park High School until his graduation in 1995. Malfi went on to study at Anne Arundel Community College and ultimately received a degree in English from Towson University in 1999.

Malfi began writing stories at an early age. His earliest short stories and small press novels saw Malfi using his full name, Ronald Damien Malfi, but he later dropped his middle name for his mass market releases. As for his daily writing routine, Malfi has said he typically tries to write about 15 pages a day. He is considered one of the new wave of literary, or "art house," horror novelists.

In 2009, his novel Shamrock Alley, based on the true exploits of his own father, a retired Secret Service agent who went undercover and infiltrated the violent Irish gang in Manhattan known as The Westies, was released and optioned for television. The novel also won a Silver Independent Publisher Book Awards medal (IPPY) in the thriller/suspense/mystery novel category in 2010.

In 2010, his novel Snow was released in paperback to much acclaim, as reviewers touted the novel's near-flawless pacing and descriptive writing. Malfi claims the novel was "feverishly hammered out in about two weeks." The plot of the novel follows a group of strangers in to a town in Iowa which has been overrun by snow phantoms that can turn people into flesh-hungry zombies.

In 2011, the publication of his novel Floating Staircase garnered him much praise, and the novel won a Gold IPPY Award and was nominated by the Horror Writers Association for the Bram Stoker Award for best novel of 2011.

During a 2011 radio interview, Malfi stated that most of his fiction deals with the concept of lost or confused identity.

Malfi is also a musician, who has composed music for independent films, and was the lead singer/songwriter and rhythm guitarist for the Baltimore-based alternative rock band Nellie Blide (from 2000 to 2002) and his current project, Veer.

== Novels ==
- The Space Between (2000)
- The Fall of Never (2004)
- The Nature of Monsters (2006)
- Via Dolorosa (2007)
- Passenger (2008)
- Shamrock Alley (2009)
- Snow (Lesiure Books, 2010)
- The Ascent (2010)
- Cradle Lake (2011)
- Floating Staircase (2011)
- The Narrows (2012)
- December Park (2014)
- Little Girls (2015)
- The Night Parade (2016)
- Bone White (2017)
- Come With Me (2021)
- Black Mouth (2022)
- Small Town Horror (2024)
- Senseless (2025)
- The Hive (2026)

== Novellas ==
- Borealis (2009)
- The Stranger (2009)
- The Separation (2011)
- Skullbelly (2011)
- After the Fade (2012)
- The Mourning House (2012)
- A Shrill Keening (2014)
- Mr. Cables (2020)

== Collections ==
- Ronald Malfi Thriller Collection (2012)
- They Lurk: 4 Novellas (2014)
- We Should Have Left Well Enough Alone (2018)
- Ghostwritten: 4 Novellas (2022)

== Awards and acknowledgments ==
"I Know What You Are" (poem)
- Second Place (amateur), "Dracula '97" from the Transylvanian Society of Dracula.

Shamrock Alley
- Independent Publisher Book Award (Silver)

Floating Staircase
- Nominated for a Bram Stoker Award for Best Novel of 2011
- Independent Publisher Book Award (Gold Medal of Honor)
- Winner (third place), Vincent Preis International Horror Award

Cradle Lake
- Benjamin Franklin Independent Book Award (Silver)

Little Girls
- Shortlist - American Library Association's Year's Best in Genre Fiction

== See also ==
- Delirium Books
- Leisure Books
- Kensington Books
