= Nate Kenyon =

American novelist

- Occupation: Novelist
- Writing career
- Genres: Thriller, Horror, science fiction
- Website: www.natekenyon.com

Nate Kenyon is an American author of thrillers, science fiction, and horror novels and short fiction. His latest book, Day One, was released by Thomas Dunne Books on October 1, 2013.

Kenyon's first novel, Bloodstone (Five Star Publishing, 2006; Leisure Books, 2008), was a Bram Stoker Award finalist and was voted the Preditors and Editors Horror Novel of the Year for 2006. His second novel, The Reach, was also a Bram Stoker Award finalist. The Reach received a starred Publishers Weekly review, and was optioned for film. Kenyon's other novels include The Bone Factory (Leisure Books, July 2009) and Sparrow Rock (Leisure Books, May 2010). He has also written a science fiction novella, Prime (Apex Books, July 2009).

Kenyon has written two novels for Blizzard Entertainment and Pocket Books based on Blizzard's video game franchises, StarCraft and Diablo. StarCraft Ghost: Spectres was released in November 2010. Spectres is the sequel to the novel StarCraft Ghost: Nova, written by Keith R. A. DeCandido. Diablo: The Order was released in May 2012.

Kenyon is a member of the Horror Writers Association and International Thriller Writers.

Kenyon finished the Diablo III novel, Storm of Light, in late 2013.
