= Deborah LeBlanc =

American horror author

- Born: Lafayette, Louisiana, U.S.
- Occupation: Author
- Children: 3
- Writing career
- Genre: Horror fiction
- Website: deborahleblanc.com

Deborah LeBlanc is an American horror author. LeBlanc was born in Lafayette, Louisiana, the oldest of three children. She grew up in Scott, a small town west of Lafayette, where she learned to love reading and writing at an early age. LeBlanc is an active member of several writers groups and has won numerous awards from her colleagues and national writing associations. LeBlanc served as president of the Horror Writers Association from 2006 to 2010.

LeBlanc has served as a sales representative for an oil company, an executive vice-president for a transportation company, and has created two corporations of her own, one involving fuel, the other management consultation for funeral service. LeBlanc lives in Cajun south-central Louisiana with her three daughters.

== Bibliography ==
- Family Inheritance (Leisure Books, 2004)
- Grave Intent (Leisure Books, 2005)
- A House Divided (Leisure Books, 2006)
- Morbid Curiosity (Leisure Books) (2007)
- Water Witch (Leisure Books, 2008)

== See also ==
- List of horror fiction writers
