= Snow (Malfi novel) =

2010 novel by Ronald Malfi

- First edition
- Author: Ronald Malfi
- Language: English
- Genre: Horror novel
- Publisher: Leisure Books
- Publication date: March 2010
- Publication place: United States
- Media type: Print (Hardback & Paperback)
- Pages: 311
- ISBN: 978-0-8439-6355-7 (first paperback edition)
- Preceded by: Shamrock Alley
- Followed by: The Ascent

Snow is a horror novel written by Ronald Malfi. It was published in March 2010 by Leisure Books, with a limited edition hardcover published by Altar 13, which contained additional material not in the original novel. Snow is the seventh book published by the author after The Space Between, The Fall of Never, The Nature of Monsters, Via Dolorosa, Passenger, and Shamrock Alley.

== Synopsis ==
The novel, which is broken up into two sections, "The Storm" and "Surviving," follows a group of strangers who become stranded at Chicago's O'Hare International Airport on Christmas Eve when a snow storm blows in. Todd Curry wants to see his estranged son Justin and his ex-wife Brianna for the holidays, having disappointed them in previous years. Kate Jansen also wants to get home for the holiday, as do fellow travelers Fred and Nan Wilkinson.

The group, led by Todd, rents an SUV and attempts to drive to their respective destinations in Iowa, but their plans are changed when they nearly run over a man wandering through the snow. The SUV is wrecked so the travelers walk to Woodson, the nearest town. They learn that this town is overrun by phantoms that are made of snow, or a snow-like substance, and these phantoms have the ability to enter human beings and turn them into cannibalistic zombies.

The travelers fend off the creatures and make their way through the town in search of any working vehicles, telephones, or computers, as the creatures, and the storm that accompanies them, seem to have rendered all mechanical devices useless. Eventually, Todd and Kate find survivors in the basement of the town's police station. There's Tully, a rough-around-the-edges townperson; Brendan and Molly, a couple with a baby on the way; Bruce, the town's remaining police officer; and Charlie and Cody, kids who also happen to be brother and sister. At the police station, Todd and Kate learn that mechanical devices that had not been in the town when the attack started still function properly.

In the last daring effort to escape Woodson, Todd, Brendan, and Bruce venture back out into the streets to locate Todd's laptop computer, which he had carried with him and left at the Pack 'N Go, the town convenience store. Once they find it and return to the police station, they are able to rig up the computer to fiber optics cables and the internet and send for help from nearby police stations. When help arrives in the form of the National Guard, the creatures have retreated into a swirling hole in the sky and disappear. Todd is then shot but not killed by Molly who blames Todd for the death of Brendan. As Todd recovers in the hospital, he is visited and questioned by two federal agents. It is then that he learns the events in Woodson had not been isolated and that there were many towns throughout North America that had suffered a similar fate.

== Reception ==
The book received moderate to favorable reviews, with one reviewer suggesting, "I highly recommend bumping this title to the top of your to-read list" while HorrorNews praised the book's "wonderful characters" and "atmospheric prose".
