= Demott–Westervelt House =

Historic house in New Jersey, United States

- U.S. National Register of Historic Places
- New Jersey Register of Historic Places
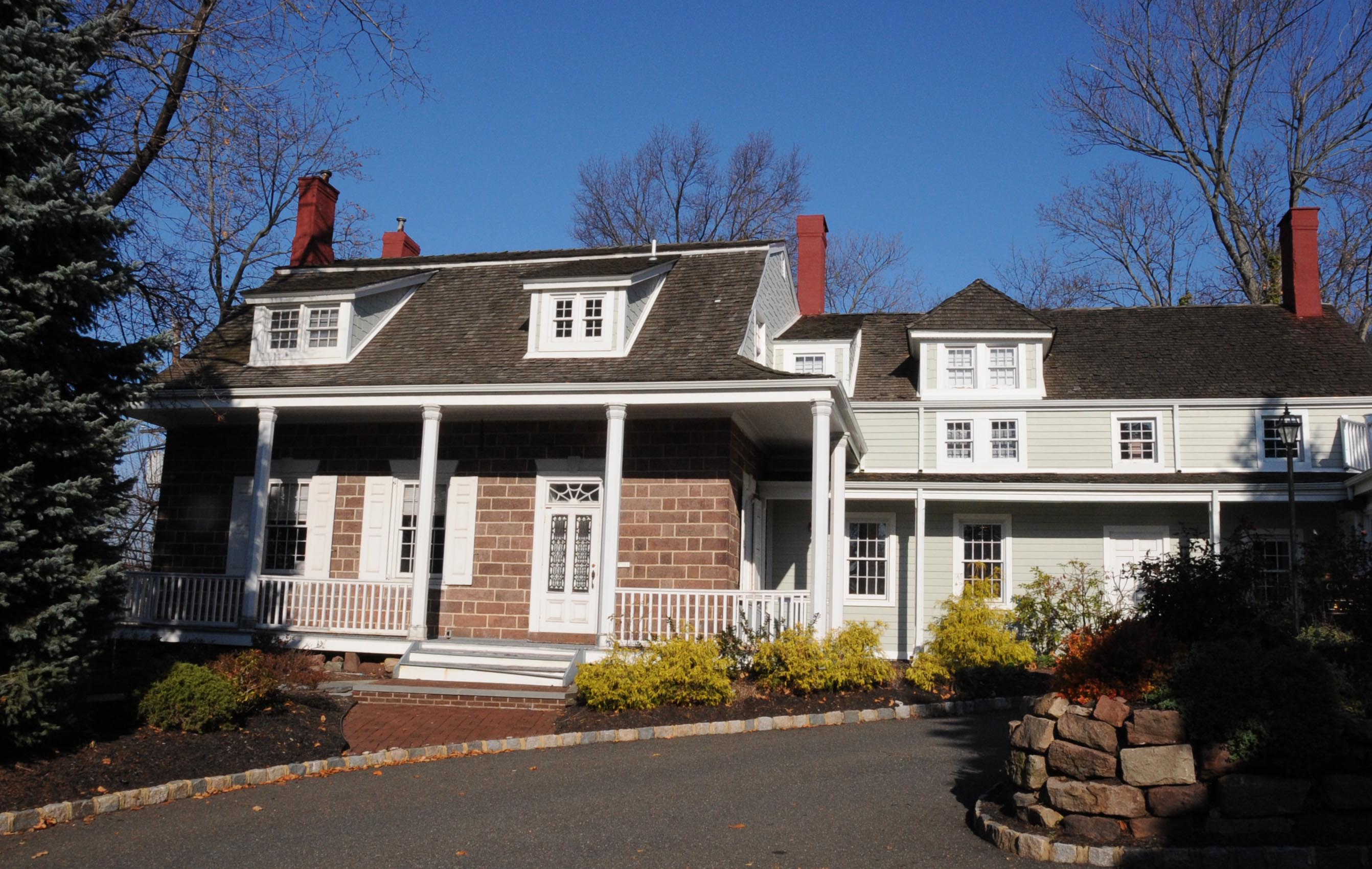
- (2015)

- Location within Bergen County, New Jersey Location within New Jersey Location within the United States
- Location: 285 Grand Avenue, Englewood, New Jersey
- Coordinates: 40°53′1″N 73°58′38″W
- Built: 1808
- Built by: Peter Westervelt
- MPS: Stone Houses of Bergen County TR
- NRHP reference No.: 83001500
- NJRHP No.: 473

Significant dates
- Added to NRHP: January 9, 1983
- Designated NJRHP: October 3, 1980

The Demott–Westervelt House, also known as the Peter Westervelt House, is located at 285 Grand Avenue in the city of Englewood in Bergen County, New Jersey, United States. The historic stone house was built in 1808 by Peter Westervelt for Henry Demott. It was documented by the Historic American Buildings Survey (HABS) in 1936. It was added to the National Register of Historic Places on January 9, 1983, for its significance in architecture and exploration/settlement. It was listed as part of the Early Stone Houses of Bergen County Multiple Property Submission (MPS).

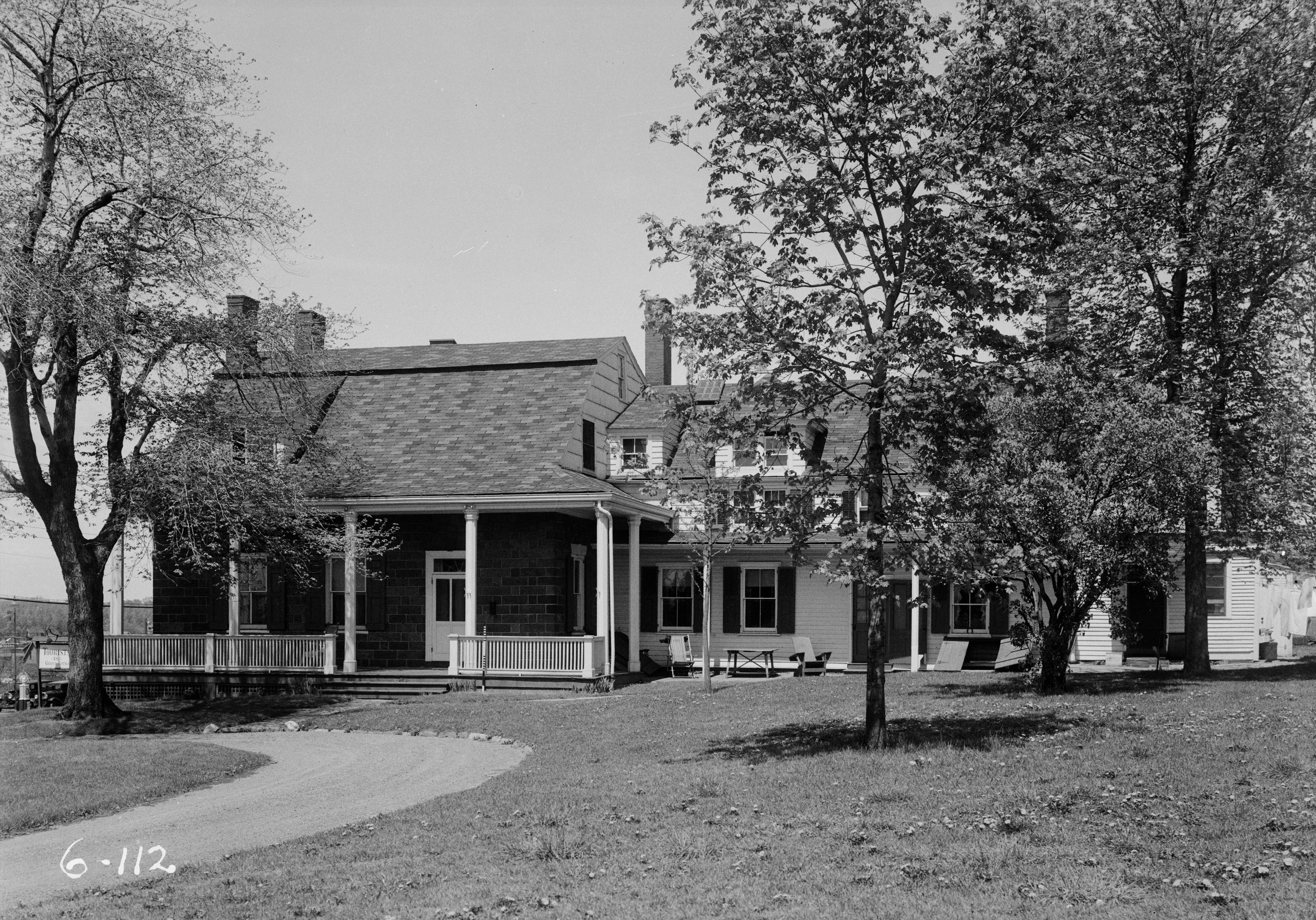
HABS photo from 1936

== See also ==
- National Register of Historic Places listings in Bergen County, New Jersey
