= City of the Dead (novel) =

2005 book by Brian Keene

- Author: Brian Keene
- Language: English
- Genre: Horror novel
- Publisher: Delirium Books
- Publication date: 2005
- Publication place: United States
- Media type: Print (hardback & paperback)
- Preceded by: The Rising

City of the Dead is a novel by Brian Keene published in 2005. It is the sequel to The Rising.

== Plot ==
Jim finds Danny alive as the book opens but the living dead soon converge on their location. Frankie and Martin join Jim in the house and they are soon trapped in the attic. As they see Danny's neighbor in his panic room across the way the zombies set fire to the house. They rig a ladder between the two houses and everyone but Frankie makes it across, Frankie however has a two-story fall into a swimming pool below. Meanwhile: Don, Martin, Jim, and Danny regroup and make a run for Don's Ford explorer. Upon escaping the garage they find Frankie fighting zombies in the front yard badly hurt from the fall and shot several times. They rescue her as she goes into shock.

Back in Hellertown Ob has taken Baker's body and is instructing his minions to make a motor pool from all the abandoned vehicles. Ob is distressed that Jim is alive and escaping him, he begins to fantasize killing Martin and Jim. Here he divulges that the Siqqusim can see the life auras coming from the living. Ob is then killed by some hiding guardsmen who he discovers.

Their escape is short lived as Frankie left the keys in the Humvee and the zombies are in hot pursuit. They use the Humvee to force the car into an accident. Jim regains consciousness as zombies are trying to pull Danny from the wreckage and biting his arm. Jim loses it and violently kills the zombie, punctuating each blow with the words "I told you to leave my son alone." Martin has been thrown from the car and his head had turned a full 180 degrees around. Jim smashes his head in with a rock as he reanimates proclaiming "There is no God". Jim leads the zombies away distracting them from his party including a very badly injured Frankie making plans to meet them in what looks like an abandoned parking structure. There is a legless zombie hiding in a car who alerts more zombies to the groups presence. Jim races back to the structure as the group races for the roof. Almost simultaneously a helicopter shows up using a powerful sonic device that kills all the zombie birds and almost kills Jim. They rescue Jim and take him to Ramsey towers.

Ob reanimates in a new body that is in great shape. His host died of a heart attack while masturbating. His old host had knowledge of secret armories for the NYPD as well as the National Guard. He uses this knowledge to help arm his army as he sends for his forces in Hellertown as well as across the country. He also learns that all human life in Europe and Asia has been eliminated.

Ob then lays siege to last remaining humans holed up in Ramsey towers, using heavy artillery he is able to breach the supposedly impenetrable building. With the approaching forces the remaining humans are falling apart as the zombies storm the towers and eradicate them. Jim, Frankie, and a few others escape into the sewers only to be followed by Ob and his forces. Three of the company are killed by Zombie rats, one of a gunshot wound, one eaten by a zombie crocodile, and one having his throat slit by another zombie. Ob personally confronts Jim telling him he is glad to be the one ending his incredible journey; Jim then uses a flamethrower on a gas line killing Ob and the surrounding zombies. Frankie and Danny are eventually killed by zombie rats in their sleep.

Sometime before the final act however, Frankie has a dream in which the spirit of Martin talks to her, laying out the complex plan set up by Ob and his minions. The plan shows her that surviving the zombies would have been just the first ordeal. The undead were merely the first wave, with the purpose of eliminating all human and animal life. Once that task is accomplished, other demons would begin the assimilation of the plants and insects. It is also revealed that Jim, Danny and the rest of the characters from the books are reunited in some sort of afterlife and are happy.

== Reception ==
Don D'Ammassa of the SF, Fantasy & Horror's Monthly Trade Journal wrote: "Less ambitious and original than his other novels, but no less well written." Monica S. Kuebler of the Rue Morgue wrote that the novel "cranks the action up to eleven and, Keene deserves serious props for. ending the novel as he does."
