= The Conqueror Worms =

Post-apocalyptic-themed horror novel by Brian Keene

- First (limited) edition (original title)
- Author: Brian Keene
- Original title: Earthworm Gods
- Language: English
- Genre: Post-apocalyptic horror
- Publisher: Delirium Books
- Publication date: Sep 2005
- Publication place: United States
- Media type: Print (paperback)
- Pages: 301 pp (first edition)
- ISBN: 0-8439-5416-7 (first edition, paperback)
- OCLC: 63186484

The Conqueror Worms (alternate title Earthworm Gods) is a post-apocalyptic horror novel written by author Brian Keene. "Earthworm Gods" was a 9,000-word short story that simultaneously was printed in 4x4 and No Rest for the Wicked.

An indirect sequel to this tale, the 19,000 word novella The Garden Where My Rain Grows, appeared in Fear of Gravity; it was set in the same world, but the characters and situation differed.

These two tales, short story and novella, were later re-imagined as an 85,000 word novel entitled Earthworm Gods that was published by Delirium Books. The title was altered to The Conqueror Worms when the paperback edition was released by Leisure Books, but the content (aside from minor spelling/grammatical alterations) was the same.

== Plot summary ==
Teddy Garnett, an older man and war veteran, tells the story of a global flood that has left humanity in tatters. Holed up in his mountain home in West Virginia, Teddy and his buddy, Carl Seaton, struggle through daily life, puzzling over things even stranger than a 40-day rainstorm, including the giant slime-coated holes that keep showing up in Teddy's yard and the giant worm-like creature that ate a robin outside of Teddy's window. Meanwhile, Teddy is reeling over the loss of his wife Rose and the mysterious fate of his children and grandchildren.

Before long, Teddy and Carl are fending off man-eating earthworms the size of buses. A helicopter crash nearby brings Kevin and Sarah, the last two survivors of an outpost in Baltimore, into Teddy's story; their tale makes up the bizarre second part of the book that explores the insanity doom can inspire. Kevin serves as the narrator for this tale and he tells about how he and a group of survivors faced off against all kinds of terror in Baltimore, including Satanists who make sacrifices to a mysterious beast known as Leviathan.

The story concludes with a showdown back at Teddy's house with a creature so monstrous, it scares even the killer earthworms.

== Editions ==
- Leather-Bound Hardcover (Delirium Books, Sept. 2005): Limited to 52 signed and lettered copies. Also includes the short story "Take Me To The River," which is set in the same universe as Earthworm Gods.
- Limited Edition Hardcover (Delirium Books, Sept. 2005): Limited to 400 signed and numbered copies. 229 pages.
- Mass Market Paperback (Leisure Books, May 2006): 326 pages; Dimensions (inches): 6.9 x 4.2 x 0.9; ISBN 0-8439-5416-7.
