= Wes DeMott =

American writer

- Born: Roseburg, Oregon, U.S.
- Occupation: Writer
- Writing career
- Genre: Political thriller

Wes DeMott is an American political thriller writer who was born in Roseburg, Oregon. He honorably served in the U.S. Navy, is a former FBI agent, private investigator, and has worked as an actor.

== Bibliography ==
- Loving Zelda, A Story of Change Reluctantly Told (2011), ISBN 978-1-61220-043-9 Admiral House Publishing
- The Typhoon Sanction (2011), ISBN 978-1-61220-044-6. Admiral House Publishing
- Tortuga Gold, A Mayday Salvage and Rescue Adventure (2011), ISBN 978-1-61220-045-3 Admiral House Publishing
- Walking K (1998), ISBN 0-9659602-6-9. 9780965960267. Admiral House
- Vapors (1999), ISBN 0-9659602-7-7, ISBN 978-0-9659602-7-4 Admiral House
- Stiny, (2000) ISBN 80-7218-336-2, ISBN 978-80-7218-336-4. Czech translation of Vapors, published by Alpress.
- Árnyak (2001), ISBN 963-9261-50-5, ISBN 978-963-9261-50-1, Hungarian translation of Vapors, Athenaeum (Hungary).
- Фонд (2008), ISBN 978-5-17-039121-9, ISBN 978-5-9713-7250-9, 978-5-226-00257-1. Russian translation of Vapors.
- The Fund (2004), ISBN 0-8439-5446-9, ISBN 978-0-8439-5446-3. Leisure Books
- Heat Sync, (2006), ISBN 0-8439-5545-7. 9780843955453. Leisure Books
- The Fund, audio book (2009) ISBN 978-1-60548-200-2. Books in Motion.
- Heat Sync, audio book (2009) ISBN 978-1-60548-204-0. Books in Motion
- "Walking K", audio book (2009), ISBN 978-1-60548-351-1. Books in Motion
