= The Rising (Keene novel) =

2003 book by Brian Keene

- Author: Brian Keene
- Cover artist: Alan M. Clark
- Language: English
- Genre: Horror novel
- Publisher: Delirium Books
- Publication date: April 2003
- Publication place: United States
- Media type: Print (Hardback & Paperback)
- ISBN: 1-929653-41-7 (first edition, hardback)
- OCLC: 52499502
- Followed by: City of the Dead

The Rising is the first book in a series of zombie-themed horror novels written by author Brian Keene. This title won the Bram Stoker Award for Best First Novel in 2003. The Rising was optioned for both film and video game adaptation in 2004.

== Plot summary ==
The story starts off in the aftermath of a particle accelerator experiment. Somehow the experiment has opened some sort of interdimensional rift allowing demons to possess the dead. As the dead come back to life, a zombie plague results.

The story's protagonist is Jim Thurmond, a construction worker living in West Virginia. Hiding away in a bomb shelter, which was previously constructed because of a fear of the aftermath of Y2K, Thurmond holds off packs of roving zombies, many of which were his neighbors and one of which is his recently deceased second wife who was pregnant. A distraught Jim laments his situation and worries about his son, Danny, who is living with Jim's first wife in upstate New Jersey. Jim considers suicide when unexpectedly Jim's cellphone rings with a message from his son, Danny. Danny whispers into the phone that he is hiding from the zombies in his mother's attic. Jim's suicidal thoughts turn around into a new purpose - to rescue Danny. Jim packs some supplies from the shelter and heads out into an apocalyptic United States overrun with gruesome sights. Jim fights his way out of the shelter by killing his undead neighbors and even his undead second wife, who taunts him with his unborn daughter. The moment he leaves the shelter, Jim is on the run discovering that the undead possess the ability to think, drive cars, use weapons, and set traps for the living.

Meanwhile, a scientist named Baker, who was working on the particle accelerator, is trapped within the confines of his underground workspace. Baker feels as if he is directly responsible for the zombie plague, believing that his experiment is what allowed the demons through to the human world. An old colleague is trapped inside a room, a member of the undead who refers to himself as Ob. The zombie named Ob explains that he comes from somewhere called The Void. The Void is part of The Labyrinth that exist in all "Levels" (multidimensional planes of existence), and where The Thirteen exist - Ob is one of The Thirteen. He learns that the zombies are not occupied by their original selves but instead a different evil entity with access to the host body's memories. Baker eventually escapes and finds his life being saved by Worm, a deaf young man whom the grateful Baker takes under his wing.

Jim eventually meets Martin, a wise elderly black minister. The two join forces to find Danny and soon run into many life-threatening situations such as packs of roving zombies, backwood cannibals seeking extra food and undead wildlife. Among their exploits, they run into a father and son in hiding, who help them along the way until tragedy strikes in a double suicide for the two. At the same time, Frankie, a heroin user and prostitute who is trying to hide from a vengeful pimp, narrowly escapes disaster in the Baltimore Zoo begins a trek out of the cities and into the country. Somewhere within Pennsylvania, the National Guard has seized control of the area. Led by the sociopath Colonel Schow, the soldiers abuse their authority by violently drafting people into their slave force, turning women into sexual slaves, and torturing anyone who questions them. Amongst all this chaos a lone private named Skip, who is disgusted with his comrades' behavior, looks to escape. Frankie eventually meets up with Jim and Martin. Together they help Jim reach his destination, New Jersey.

In the final chapter all the main characters meet which results in a scene of extreme violence providing a cliffhanger conclusion that raises more questions than answers. The story is continued in the sequel, City of the Dead.

== Editions ==
- Ultra Edition Hardcover (Delirium Books, April 2003): Limited to 6 signed and numbered copies, bound in leather and packaged in a leather hinge box. 324 pages; Dimensions (inches): 1.25 x 8.50 x 5.75.
- Leather-Bound Hardcover (Delirium Books, April 2003): Limited to 26 signed and numbered copies. 324 pages; Dimensions (inches): 1.25 x 8.50 x 5.75.
- Limited Edition Hardcover (Delirium Books, April 2003): Limited to 300 signed and numbered copies. 324 pages; Dimensions (inches): 1.25 x 8.50 x 5.75; ISBN 1-929653-41-7.
- Mass Market Paperback (Leisure Books, Jan. 2004): The title on the front cover is raised (embossed). 336 pages; Dimensions (inches): 0.95 x 6.78 x 4.24; ISBN 0-8439-5201-6.
- Mass Market Paperback, Second Printing (Leisure Books, 2005): The title on the front cover is flat (non-embossed). 336 pages; Dimensions (inches): 0.95 x 6.78 x 4.24; ISBN 0-8439-5201-6.
- Mass Market Paperback, Third Printing (Leisure Books, 2006): The title on the front cover is flat (non-embossed). 336 pages; Dimensions (inches): 0.95 x 6.78 x 4.24; ISBN 0-8439-5201-6.

== Reception ==
Mark Athitakis of The New York Times wrote that the novel "revels in its blunt and vesceral descriptions of the undead." Don D'Ammassa of the SF, Fantasy & Horror's Monthly Trade Journal wrote: "It's not the most cheerful of stories, but it's well written, suspenseful, and frequently scary." Liisa Ladouceur of the Rue Morgue called the novel an "action-packed page-turner" and wrote that Keene's writing is "direct and disgusting".
