= Dorchester Publishing =

American publishing company

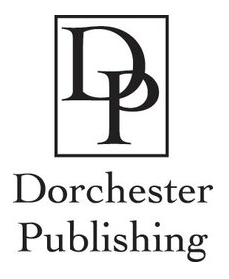
- Founded: 1971; 55 years ago
- Country of origin: United States
- Headquarters location: 200 Madison Avenue, Suite 2000; New York City 10016
- Key people: Don D'Auria (Executive Editor, 1995–2010)
- Publication types: Books, magazines
- Fiction genres: Romance, Horror, Thrillers Western
- Imprints: Leisure Books (c. 1982–2010); Love Spell
- Official website: dorchesterpub.com

Dorchester Publishing was a publisher of mass market paperback books. Although mostly known for romance, Dorchester also published horror, thriller and Western titles.

== Publication lines ==
Dorchester was the original publisher of the Hard Case Crime line of pulp-style mysteries. In addition, Dorchester distributes the Family Doctor series of health guides in the US and Canada. Their Love Spell imprint handles the newer types of romance, and complements their more traditional Leisure Books imprint. They also have an imprint for thrillers, the Smooch imprint for young adult literature, and Making It for trade paperback chick-lit novels.

Dorchester also publishes romance magazines such as True Confessions and True Story. Dorchester offers book clubs, fan registries, and a comprehensive website for readers. Dorchester books are featured in their "Dear Reader Book Clubs", which allows readers to read a chapter a day from the book for a week.

== History ==
Dorchester Publishing was founded in 1971, and claims to be the oldest independent mass market publisher in America.

Dorchester acquired Leisure Books in c. 1982, making it into a Dorchester imprint and eventually transitioning Leisure into a horror line.

They added the Love Spell imprint in 1993, and new thriller and young adult imprints in 2003. In 2004, they launched their trade paperback chick-lit imprint Making It, and with Charles Ardai they co-founded the Hard Case Crime imprint.

Also in 2004, Dorchester purchased magazine publisher Sterling/MacFadden, acquiring with it several romance magazines.

In August 2010, after two years of big drops in sales, Dorchester announced a temporary shift from printing books on paper to e-books and print-on-demand services. At the same time, they announced that they would be setting new royalty rates for their authors. However, in October 2010, the Mystery Writers of America removed Dorchester from their list of Approved Publishers citing failure to pay authors their advances and royalties. In November, Dorchester's former CEO, John Prebich, resigned and was replaced by Robert Anthony; Anthony promised that his first step would be to review the publisher's royalty process. In October 2010, Dorchester announced that publication of the Hard Case Crime imprint would be transferred from Dorchester to Titan Books, and in January and February 2011, Dorchester offered to sell off the names of several of its discontinued magazines.

At the end of 2011, BroadLit purchased the subscriber databases and content of True Romance and True Love magazines—including more than 12,000 stories, photos, and illustrations from the 1920s to 2011. BroadLit is publishing both print and e-book compilations of stories from the magazines, grouped by themes, under the TruLOVE Collection umbrella.

In March 2011, horror author Brian Keene announced a boycott of Dorchester over claims that it was still not paying its authors and that it had sold books to which it did not own the sales rights; Keene was joined by dozens of other authors, editors, artists, and organizations. Dorchester responded by promising to suppress sales of reverted books and to pay its authors what they are owed.

In August 2012 Amazon Publishing announced that it had acquired at auction the publishing contacts of over 1000 books from Dorchester Publishing. Dorchester authors were offered the opportunity to join Amazon Publishing and receive the full back royalties that Dorchester indicated were owed. Under the terms of Amazon's bid, any former Dorchester Publishing authors that chose not to work with Amazon Publishing will have their rights revert to them to pursue other publishing opportunities including self-publishing via the Kindle Direct Publishing platform.
