= Brian Keene =

American author and podcaster (born 1967)

- Born: September 22, 1967 (age 59)
- Occupation: Novelist
- Writing career
- Period: 1997–present
- Genre: Horror
- Notable works: The Rising, The Conqueror Worms
- Website: briankeene.com

Brian Keene (born September 22, 1967) is an American author, podcaster, and film producer, primarily known for his work in horror, dark fantasy, crime fiction, and comic books. He has won the 2014 World Horror Grandmaster Award and two Bram Stoker Awards. In addition to his own original work, Keene has written for media properties such as Doctor Who, Thor, Hellboy, Alien, Masters of the Universe, and The X-Files.

== Early life ==
Keene was born in 1967. He grew up in both Pennsylvania and West Virginia, and many of his books take place in these locales. After graduating high school, he served as a radioman in the U.S. Navy aboard an LPD. After his enlistment ended, Keene worked a variety of jobs before becoming a full-time writer. Among them were stints as a foundry worker, truck driver, data entry clerk, dockworker, telemarketer, customer service representative, repo man, bouncer, disc jockey, salesman, store manager, daycare instructor, custodian. In interviews, he credits this diverse background as the key to the characters that populate his books.

== Bibliography ==
=== The Rising Series ===
1. The Rising (2003): Delirium Books
2. City of the Dead (2005): Delirium Books
3. The Rising: Selected Scenes from the End of the World (2013). Deadite Press.
4. The Rising: Deliverance (2015). Deadite Press.
5. The Fall (Coming Soon)

=== Earthworm Gods Series ===
1. Earthworm Gods (2005): Delirium Books,
  1. Republished as The Conqueror Worms (2006). Leisure Books.
  2. Republished again under its intended title Earthworm Gods (2012). Deadite Press.
2. Earthworm Gods II: Deluge (2013). Deadite Press. (originally serialized on his website)
3. Earthworm Gods: Selected Scenes From the End of the World (2013). Deadite Press.

=== Levi Stoltzfus Series ===
1. Dark Hollow (2006): (released in hardcover as The Rutting Season) Bloodletting Press. (February 2008): Leisure Books.
2. Ghost Walk (August 2008): Leisure Books
3. A Gathering of Crows (August 2010): Leisure Books
4. The Last of the Albatwitches (2015). Deadite Press.

=== Clickers Series (with J. F. Gonzalez) ===
1. Clickers II: The Next Wave (2007). Delirium Books.
2. Clickers III: Dagon Rising (2010). Delirium Books.
3. Clickers vs. Zombies (2014). Deadite Press.

=== The Lost Level Series ===
1. Hole in the World (2019). Apex Publications.
2. The Lost Level (2015). Apex Publications.
3. The Chinese Beetle (2016). Thunderstorm Books. (chapbook)
4. Return to the Lost Level (2018). Apex Publications.
5. Beneath the Lost Level (Coming Soon)

=== The Labyrinth Series ===
1. The Seven (2015–18). Online serial. Self-Published through Patreon and physically in 2021
2. Submerged. Online serial. Self-published through Patreon and physically in 2022
3. Splintered. Online serial. Self-published through Patreon and physically in 2023

=== The Rogan Series (w/Steven L. Shrewsbury) ===
1. King of the Bastards (2015). Apex Publications.
2. Throne of the Bastards (2017). Apex Publications.
3. Curse of the Bastards (2022). Apex Publications.

=== Non-Series ===
- Terminal (2004). Bloodletting Press. Revised and expanded (2005): Bantam Spectra
- Ghoul (2007) Leisure Books (2007): Delirium Books
- Dead Sea (2007) Leisure Books (2007): Delirium Books
- Shades (with Geoff Cooper) (2007): (Out of Print) Cemetery Dance Publications
- Kill Whitey (2008): Cemetery Dance Publications (2008): Delirium Books
- Darkness on the Edge of Town (2008): Infernal House Press (2010): Leisure Books. Revised and expanded version of previous edition.
- Castaways (2009): Leisure Books (2009). Bloodletting Press
- Urban Gothic (2009): Leisure Books
- The Girl on the Glider (2010) Cemetery Dance Publications
- Entombed (2011). Deadite Press. (takes place in same world as Dead Sea but not a direct sequel)
- Take the Long Way Home (2011). Deadite Press.
- Jack's Magic Beans (2011). Deadite Press.
- Scratch (2011) Cemetery Dance Publications
- The Damned Highway (2012) Dark Horse Publishing
- Alone (2012). Thunderstorm Books.
- The Cage (2012) Deadite
- Sundancing (2013). Thunderstorm Books.
- An Occurrence in Crazy Bear Valley (2014). Deadite Press.
- Sixty-Five Stirrup Iron Road (2014). Deadite Press.
- The Complex (2016). Deadite Press.
- Pressure (2016) Thomas Dunne Books
- School's Out (2017)
- White Fire (2018). Deadite Press.

=== Collections ===
- No Rest For The Wicked (2001): (Out of Print) Imaginary Worlds Publishing.
- No Rest For The Wicked Redux (2001): (Out of Print) Vox 13 Publishing.
- Fear of Gravity (2004). Delirium Books.
- A Little Silver Book of Streetwise Stories (2007) Borderlands Press.
- Unhappy Endings (2008). Delirium Books.
- A Conspiracy of One (2012). Thunderstorm Books.
- Blood on the Page (2014) Self-Published
- Apocrypha (2014). Thunderstorm Books.
- Libra Nigrum Scienta Secreta (The Black Book of Secret Knowledge) with J. F. Gonzalez (2015) Arcane Wisdom (Limited release)
- Where We Live and Die (2015) Lazy Fascist Books
- The Cruelty of Autumn (2015). Thunderstorm Books. Published as a limited hardcover.
- All Dark, All the Time (2016) Self-Published
- Good Things for Bad People (2017). Thunderstorm Books. Published as a limited hardcover.

=== Novellas & novelettes ===
- Tequila's Sunrise (2007). Bloodletting Press.
- Redemption (with Shane Ryan Staley) (2008): HM
- Dead Man Living (Ongoing). Self published through Patreon
- With Teeth (2021). Death’s Head Press.

=== Non-fiction ===
- End of the Road (2016). Cemetery Dance. Weekly column.
- Brian Keene's Complete History of Horror Fiction (2017-Ongoing). Cemetery Dance. Ongoing column.

=== Anthologies edited ===
- In Delirium (January 2006): (Delirium Books). Published as a 26-copy leather-bound and a hardcover 274-copy limited hardcover.
- New Dark Voices II (2009): (Delirium Books). Published as a hardcover 150-copy limited hardcover.
- The Daughters of Inanna (2015). Thunderstorm Books. Published as a limited hardcover.
- Clickers Forever: A Tribute to J.F. Gonzalez (2018). Thunderstorm Books.

== Awards ==
- 2001 Bram Stoker Award for Best Non-Fiction (for "Jobs In Hell")
- 2003 Bram Stoker Award for Best First Novel (for "The Rising")
- 2004 Shocker Award for Non-Fiction (for "Sympathy for the Devil")
- 2014 World Horror Grand Master Award
- 2015 Imaginarium Film Festival Awards for Best Screenplay, Best Short Film Genre, and Best Short Film Overall (for "Fast Zombies Suck")

2016 Imadjinn Award for Best Fantasy Novel (for "King of the Bastards")

- 2017 This Is Horror Award for Nonfiction Podcast of the Year (for The Horror Show with Brian Keene).

In 2004 and 2005, Keene spearheaded a Books For Troops program, in which various horror authors supplied free, signed books to American troops serving in Iraq, Afghanistan, and elsewhere around the world. Keene was honored for this in 2005 by the 509th Logistics Fuels Flight Squadron based at Whiteman A.F.B. in Missouri.

In 2014, an American flag was flown in Keene's honor in Afghanistan and presented to him by the United States Army International Security Assistance Force.

Keene is one of the few writers who has spoken inside the headquarters of the Central Intelligence Agency in several closed sessions.

== Comics and graphic novels ==
In 2006, three stories from Keene's Fear of Gravity were adapted in the graphic novel Brian Keene's FEAR. The stories were "Castaways", "Red Wood", and the award-winning "The King, in: Yellow".

In 2008, Marvel Comics announced that Keene would be writing for them. His first project for the company was the four-issue limited series for their MAX imprint: Dead of Night: Devil-Slayer.

Keene wrote the 25-issue series "The Last Zombie" for Antarctic Press.

Keene's work for DC Comics has included Doom Patrol, the 2010 "DCU Halloween Special", and "Masters of the Universe: The Origin of Hordak". He was originally part of the writing team for Future's End but left the project along with writer Greg Rucka, also walking away from writing Animal Man and Booster Gold.

In 2017, Keene returned to DC Comics to spearhead "DC House of Horror".

== Film adaptations ==
- In 2006, the short story "The Ties That Bind" was turned into a short film, and it had its world premiere on April 4, 2009, at the Garden State Film Festival.
- In 2009, Dark Hollow was optioned for film by director Paul Campion.
- Ghoul was made into a TV movie directed by Gregory Wilson and starring Nolan Gould and debuted on the Chiller Network on April 13, 2012.
- In July, 2015, a film adaptation of Keene's short story "Fast Zombies Suck" was released for free via YouTube.
- In December, 2016, The Naughty List, a film adaptation of Keene's short story "The Siqquism Who Stole Christmas" was released for free via YouTube and Vimeo.

== Podcast ==
From 2015 to 2020, Keene hosted a weekly podcast called The Horror Show With Brian Keene. Keene and co-hosts Dave Thomas and Mary SanGiovanni discussed horror-related news and events, writing and publishing, and interviewed various horror authors, publishers, musicians, actors, and filmmakers.

== Personal life ==
Keene currently lives in York, Pennsylvania.

Since 2012, he has been in a romantic relationship with fellow author Mary SanGiovanni. The two were married on May 27, 2023.

On June 5, 2018, he suffered first and second degree burns to his face, and second and third degree burns to his arm after an accident while burning brush on a friend's property (during flood clean-up), and was sent to recuperate in a burn unit. Due to a lack of insurance, a GoFundMe was set up to pay the medical bills.

== Philanthropy ==
Keene is actively involved in fundraising for the Scares That Care charitable organization.

In August 2017, Keene was made a member of the board of directors for the Scares That Care charitable organization.
