= Bloodletting Press =

Publishing house focused on horror fiction

Bloodletting Press was launched in 2002 by Larry Roberts to publish works in the horror genre specifically for the collector's market, producing low print run limited editions intended for collectors and unique heirloom Lettered Editions for the high-end collectors. They were originally located in Modesto, California, but have since relocated to Welches, Oregon. Several of the Lettered Editions have been signed in blood and housed in metal traycases, in one example designed as a trailer complete with working interior lights. The main focus, however, of the press is the Novella Series, Novelette Series, and Chapbook Series. In recent years they have added the Steve Gerlach library, a project to publish his complete works which have been previously only available in his native Australia. Another project is the Jonathan Crowley Library which collects and keeps in print the genre work of James A. Moore. Bloodletting Press is also one of a few small presses that risks putting out new genre authors whose titles having been successful within this context go on to wider mass market publishers, such as Rage, Succulent Prey and The Rutting Season. In 2009, the Horror Writers Association awarded to Bloodletting Press its Specialty Press Award for their "outstanding design and production techniques" in publishing the "modern masters of the horror field".

For a time, Bloodletting Press also distributed other small press titles via their website, and in January 2008 with Delirium Books, combined their distribution arms of their individual presses into the Horror Mall. Each press had previously published and distributed their own titles.

== Novels ==
- Breeder by Douglas Clegg (2002): Published as a 26-copy leather-bound hardcover and 500-copy limited hardcover.
- Rage by Steve Gerlach (2003): Published as a 26-copy leather-bound hardcover and 300-copy limited hardcover.
- Neverland by Douglas Clegg (2003): Published as a 26-copy leather-bound hardcover and 400-copy limited hardcover.
- Siren Promised by Alan M. Clark & Jeremy Robert Johnson (2003): Published as a 26-copy leather-bound hardcover and 250-copy limited hardcover.
- Darklings by Ray Garton (2004): Published as a 26-copy leather-bound hardcover and 300-copy limited hardcover.
- The Fear Report by Elizabeth Massie (2004): Published as a 26-copy leather-bound hardcover and 300-copy limited hardcover.
- The Cleansing by Shane Ryan Stayley (2005): Published as a 26-copy leather-bound hardcover and 150-copy limited hardcover.
- Lake Mountain by Steve Gerlach (2005): Published as a 26-copy leather-bound hardcover and 400-copy limited hardcover.
- Succulent Prey by Wrath James White (2005): Published as a 26-copy leather-bound hardcover and 100-copy limited hardcover.
- Love Lies Dying by Steve Gerlach (2006): Published as a 26-copy leather-bound hardcover and 300-copy limited hardcover.
- The Rutting Season by Brian Keene (2006): Published as a 26-copy leather-bound hardcover and 400-copy limited hardcover.
- Ancient Eyes by David Niall Wilson (August 2007): Published as a 26-copy leather-bound hardcover and 300-copy limited hardcover.
- Tequila's Sunrise by Brian Keene (October 2007): Published as a 26-copy leather-bound hardcover and 500-copy limited hardcover.
- Shackled by Ray Garton (January 2008): Published as a 26-copy leather-bound hardcover and 400-copy limited hardcover.
- Hunting Zoe by Steve Gerlach (March 2008): Published as a 26-copy leather-bound hardcover and 300-copy limited hardcover.
- Castaways by Brian Keene (March 2009): Published as a 26-copy leather-bound hardcover and 300-copy limited hardcover.
- Trolley No. 1852 by Edward Lee (May 2009): Published as a 26-copy leather-bound hardcover and 300-copy limited hardcover.

== Novella Series ==
- Book #1: Boneland by Jeffrey Thomas (2004): Published as a 26-copy leather-bound hardcover and 400-copy limited hardcover.
- Book #2: Terminal by Brian Keene (2004): Published as a 26-copy leather-bound hardcover and 400-copy limited hardcover.
- Book #3: Thrust by Tom Piccirilli (2005): Published as a 26-copy leather-bound hardcover and 400-copy limited hardcover.
- Book #4: Vessels by Kealan Patrick Burke (2006): Published as a 26-copy leather-bound hardcover and 400-copy limited hardcover.
- Book #5: Desecration by Michael Laimo (2007): Published as a 26-copy leather-bound hardcover and 400-copy limited hardcover.
- Book #6: Hero Wrath James White & J.F. Gonzalez (June 2008): Published as a 26-copy leather-bound hardcover and 400-copy limited hardcover.

== Novelette Series ==
- Book #1: Apocalypse Green by Brian Knight (March 2008): Published as a 52-copy hardcover and 300-copy limited softcover.
- Book #2: Patchwork by James A. Moore (January 2009): Published as a 52-copy hardcover and 300-copy limited softcover.

== Chapbook Series ==
- Book #1: Mr and Miss Torso by Edward Lee (2002): Published as a 52-copy hardcover and 300-copy limited softcover.
- Book #2: The Baby by Edward Lee (2003): Published as a 52-copy hardcover and 300-copy limited softcover.
- Book #3: Ever Nat by Edward Lee (2003): Published as a 52-copy hardcover and 300-copy limited softcover.
- Book #4: Wormwood Nights by Charlee Jacob (2005): Published as a 52-copy hardcover and 300-copy limited softcover.
- Book #5: Eye of the Guardian by Ray Garton (2005): Published as a 52-copy hardcover and 300-copy limited softcover.
- Book #6: The Hollow Earth by Steven Savile (2007): Published as a 52-copy hardcover and 300-copy limited softcover.

== Non-series chapbooks ==
- Cell Candy by Steve Gerlach (2003): Published as a 300-copy limited softcover.
- Absinthe by Jack Ketchum & Tim Lebbon (2006): Published as a 52-copy hardcover and 500-copy limited softcover.
- Little Boy Blue by James A. Moore (March 2008): Published as a 400-copy limited softcover.
- Book of Souls by Jack Ketchum (May 2008): Published as a 52-copy hardcover (December 2008) and a 500-copy limited softcover.

== Subsidiary presses ==
=== Infernal House ===
- Darkness on the Edge of Town by Brian Keene (December 2008): Published as a 26-copy lettered hardcover and as a 176-copy limited hardcover.
- Haunter of the Threshold by Edward Lee (May 2009): Published as a 26-copy lettered hardcover and as a 176-copy limited hardcover.
- The Woman by Jack Ketchum & Lucky McKee (October 2010): Published as a 26-copy lettered hardcover and as a 176-copy limited hardcover.

=== Morning Star ===
- Judas Goat by Greg F. Gifune (December 2008): Published as a 400-copy limited hardcover.
- Terminal: The Play by Brian Keene & Roy C. Booth (February 2009): Published as a 300-copy limited hardcover.
- Stone Tears by Brian Keene (February 2009): Published as a 300-copy limited softcover chapbook.
- The Damned by William Ollie (March 2009): Published as a 204-copy limited hardcover.
- Vendetta by James A. Moore (April 2009): Published as a 300-copy limited hardcover.
- Dreams in Black and White by John R. Little (June 2009): Published as a 300-copy limited hardcover.
- The Severed Nose by Jeff Strand (July 2009): Published as a 52-copy leather-bound hardcover and as a 300-copy limited softcover chapbook.
- Blaze of Glory by Weston Ochse (September 2009): Published as a 200 copy limited edition and a 26 leather-bound hardcover in traycase.
- By Bizarre Hands Rides Again by Joe R. Lansdale (September 2010): Published as a 300 copy limited edition and a 26 leather-bound hardcover in traycase.
- Cherry Hill by James A. Moore (December 2010): Published as a 150 copy limited edition and a 26 leather-bound hardcover in traycase.
- 1000 Mettle Folds by Steve Gerlach and Amanda Kool (September 2010): Published as a 150 copy limited edition.
- SPORE by John Skipp and Cody Goodfellow (March 2011): Published as a 150 copy limited edition.
- Smile No More by James A. Moore (May 2010): Published as a 150 copy limited edition and a 26 leather-bound hardcover in traycase.
- Death and Desire in the Age of Women by Michael Louis Calvillo (June 2011): Published as a 150 copy limited edition.

=== Arcane Wisdom ===
- Great God Pan and Other Weird Tales by Arthur Machen (November 2009): Published as a 200-copy limited hardcover.
- Ouroboros by Michael Kelly & Carol Weekes (March 2010): Published as a 150-copy limited hardcover.
- Moonchild by Aleister Crowley (October 2010): Published as a 300-copy limited hardcover.
