= Dark Regions Press =

- Status: Active
- Founded: 1985
- Founder: Joe Morey
- Successor: Chris Morey
- Country of origin: United States
- Headquarters location: Portland, Oregon
- Distribution: Ingram Content Group Book Distribution (ipage)
- Key people: Chris Morey - Owner and Publisher, Brian M. Sammons - Managing Editor of Weird Fiction, James R. Beach - Consultant
- Fiction genres: Horror, Dark Fiction, Fantasy, Science Fiction
- Imprints: Black Labyrinth, I AM THE ABYSS
- Official website: http://www.darkregions.com/

Dark Regions Press was an independent specialty publisher of horror, dark fiction, fantasy and science fiction, specializing in horror and dark fiction in business since 1985 founded by Joe Morey. They gained recognition around the world for their creative works in genre fiction and poetry. Dark Regions Press was awarded the Horror Writers Association 2010 Specialty Press Award and the Italian 2012 Black Spot Award for Excellence in a Foreign Publisher. They produced premium signed hardcover editions for collectors as well as quality trade paperbacks and ebook editions. Their books have received seven Bram Stoker Awards from the Horror Writers Association.

DRP published hundreds of authors, artists, and poets such as Clive Barker, Joe R. Lansdale, Santiago Caruso, Ramsey Campbell, Kevin J. Anderson, Vincent Chong, Bentley Little, Michael D. Resnick, Rick Hautala, Bruce Boston, Robert Frazier, W.H. Pugmire, Simon Strantzas, Jeffrey Thomas, Charlee Jacob, Richard Gavin, Tim Waggoner and hundreds more. Dark Regions Press created specialty books and creative projects for over twenty-nine years.

The press had staff throughout the United States working virtually but also had a localized office in Portland, Oregon from where they shipped their orders and maintained the primary components of the business.

Dark Regions Press staff, authors, artists and products have appeared in FANGORIA Magazine, Rue Morgue Magazine, Cemetery Dance Magazine, Dark Discoveries Magazine, Publishers Weekly, Kirkus Reviews, Booklist Online, LA Times, The Sunday Chicago Tribune, The Examiner, Playboy, Comic-Con, Wired, The Huffington Post, Horror World, Barnes & Noble, Amazon, iBooks, Sony Reader store and many other publications and vendors.

As of July 17, 2024 the company website has been down and the owner has been incommunicado.

== List of Authors ==
- Michael A. Arnzen
- Allyson Bird
- Clive Barker
- Robert Borski
- Bruce Boston
- Ramsey Campbell
- Mort Castle
- James Chambers
- G.O. Clark
- Christopher Conlon
- Gary William Crawford
- James Dorr
- David Dunwoody
- Gabrielle Faust
- Janet Fox
- Robert Frazier
- Jim Gavin
- Richard Gavin
- Rick Hautala
- Angeline Hawkes
- C.J. Henderson
- Brian A. Hopkins
- Sarah A. Hoyt
- Charlee Jacob
- Julia Jeffrey
- Shaun Jeffrey
- Michael Kelly
- Caitlín R. Kiernan
- Joe R. Lansdale
- Mary Soon Lee
- Michael McBride
- Daniel McGachey
- Joe McKinney
- Gary McMahon
- William Meikle
- Paul Melniczek
- Wayne Miller
- Tom Moran
- Gene O'Neill
- Scott Nicholson
- Weston Ochse
- William Ollie
- Jeffrey Osier
- Tom Piccirilli
- W.H. Pugmire
- Gina Ranalli
- Mike Resnick
- Tony Richards
- Gord Rollo
- Steven Savile
- David B. Silva
- Harry Shannon
- Marge Simon
- Dave Smeds
- Jeff Strand
- Simon Strantzas
- Jeffrey Thomas
- Scott Thomas
- Mary Turzillo
- Laura J. Underwood
- Steve Vernon
- Tim Waggoner
- Frank Walls
- Jason Whitley
- David Niall Wilson
