= Delirium Books =

American horror fiction publisher

- Status: Inactive
- Founded: 1999
- Founder: Shane Ryan Staley
- Country of origin: United States
- Headquarters location: Indiana
- Fiction genres: Horror

Delirium Books, launched in the summer of 1999 by Shane Ryan Staley, was a horror publisher in the collector's market, producing low print-run limited editions intended for collectors and readers alike. Limited-edition books published by Delirium were reputed to sell out quickly, making their publications highly collectable. Delirium Books published The Rising, the first book in a series of zombie-themed horror novels written by Brian Keene, which won the Bram Stoker Award for Best First Novel in 2003.

In 2005, Delirium Books won the Bram Stoker Award for Excellence in Specialty Press Publishing, presented by the Horror Writers Association. The same year, Delirium took home the first annual Shocker Award for Small Press of the Year, presented by Shocklines.com.

Per Staley, Delirium Books ceased activities in January 2013.

== Magazines ==
Some of the first offerings from Delirium Books were magazines, all digest-sized with color covers. The print run for these magazines is unknown.

- Delirium #1 (Winter 1999)
- Delirium #2 (Summer 2000)
- Delirium #3 (Fall 2000)
- Delirium #4 (Winter 2001)

== Chapbooks ==
- Burnt Offerings by Shane Ryan Staley (1999): Published as a 150-copy limited soft cover.
- Human Oddities by Barbara Malenky (Winter 2000): Published as a soft cover with an unknown print run.
- Chocolate Jesus and Other Weird Perversions by Shane Ryan Staley (Spring 2000): Published as a soft cover with an unknown print run.
- Shuggoth Cacciatore and Other Eldritch Entrees by Mark McLaughlin (Spring 2000): Published as a soft cover with an unknown print run.
- Smoke Signals by Octavio Ramos Jr. (Winter 2001): Published as a soft cover with an unknown print run.
- Tales of Love and Death by W. H. Pugmire (Spring 2001): Published as a soft cover with an unknown print run.
- The Rising: Necrophobia by Brian Keene, Brett McBean, Michael Oliveri, and John Urbancik (May 2004): Published as a 26-copy limited hardcover and 500-copy soft cover.

== Hardcover Line ==
Delirium's Hardcover Line features first-edition titles produced in limited editions with full-color dust jackets. Delirium produces true limited-edition hardcovers, as the runs in this line are signed and numbered from less than 50 to 500 copies. The first five Hardcover Line books were released without dust jackets. Beginning in September 2008, the Hardcover Line is published as a subscription of 150 copies.

=== 1999 ===
- The House Spider and Other Strange Visitors by Kurt Newton (August 1999): Published as a 50-copy limited hardcover. Approximately 40 copies were actually printed.
- Demons, Freaks, and Other Abnormalities by Michael Laimo (October 1999): Published in as a 150-copy limited hardcover. Approximately 100 copies were actually printed.

=== 2000 ===
- I Love You and There is Nothing You Can Do About It by Gerard Houarner (January 2000): Published as a 200-copy limited hardcover. Approximately 125 copies were actually printed.
- Terror Incognita by Jeffrey Thomas (March 2000): Published as a 200-copy limited hardcover. Approximately 125 copies were actually printed.
- Up, Out of Cities that Blow Hot and Cold by Charlee Jacob (May 2000): Published as a 20-copy leather-bound hardcover (Delirium's first leather-bound) and a 300-copy limited hardcover. Approximately 200 copies of the limited hardcover were actually printed.
- Cage of Bones and Other Deadly Obsessions by John Everson (October 2000): Published as a 300-copy limited hardcover.

=== 2001 ===
- Cobwebs and Whispers by Scott Thomas (June 2001): Published as a 250-copy limited hardcover.
- Heretics by Greg F. Gifune (August 2001): Published as a 50-copy limited hardcover.
- 4 x 4 by Brian Keene, Geoff Cooper, Michael Oliveri and Michael T. Huyck Jr. (October 2001): Published as a 100-copy limited hardcover. Initially, the printer balked at including the signature sheets, because the authors scrawled obscene messages on many of them.

=== 2002 ===
- Dark Testament edited by Shane Ryan Staley (January 2002): Published as a 200-copy limited hardcover and a 100-copy trade hardcover.
- Dark Demons by Kurt Newton (March 2002): Published as a 150-copy limited hardcover.
- Maternal Instinct by J. F. Gonzalez (April 2002): Published as a 150-copy limited hardcover.
- Guises by Charlee Jacob (June 2002): Published as a 15-copy leather-bound hardcover and a 150-copy limited hardcover.
- Atmosphere by Michael Laimo (July 2002): Published as a 15-copy leather-bound hardcover and a 300-copy limited hardcover. Delirium's first full-length novel.
- Visions Through A Shattered Lens by Gerard Houarner (September 2002): Published as a 15-copy leather-bound hardcover and a 300-copy limited hardcover.

=== 2003 ===
- Mean Sheep by Tom Piccirilli (January 2003): Published as a 26-copy leather-bound hardcover and a 400-copy limited hardcover.
- The Rising by Brian Keene (April 2003): Published as a 26-copy leather-bound hardcover, and a 300-copy limited hardcover.
- Sesqua Valley and Other Haunts by W. H. Pugmire (July 2003): Published as a 250-copy limited hardcover.
- No Rest At All by Brian Keene (August 2003): Published as a 15-copy leather-bound hardcover and a 150-copy limited hardcover.
- The Bleeding Season by Greg F. Gifune (October 2003): Published as a 250-copy limited hardcover.
- All the Lonely People by David B. Silva (December 2003): Published as a 26-copy leather-bound hardcover and a 300-copy limited hardcover.

=== 2004 ===
- Dreadful Delineations by John Maclay (January 2004): Published as a 250-copy limited hardcover.
- The Attraction by Douglas Clegg (March 2004): Published as a 26-copy leather-bound hardcover and a 500-copy limited hardcover.
- Fear of Gravity by Brian Keene (March 2004): Published as a 26-copy leather-bound hardcover and a 400-copy limited hardcover.
- Nether: Improper Bedtime Stories by Scott Thomas and Jeffrey Thomas (June 2004): Deluxe edition of Honey is Sweeter Than Blood and Shadows of Flesh. Published as a 26-copy leather-bound hardcover.
- Honey Is Sweeter Than Blood by Jeffrey Thomas (June 2004): Published as a 250-copy limited hardcover.
- Shadows of Flesh by Scott Thomas (June 2004): Published as a 250-copy limited hardcover.
- New Dark Voices by Michael Oliveri, Gene O'Neill and John Urbancik (August 2004): Published as a 300-copy limited hardcover.
- Deathrealms edited by Stephen Mark Rainey (September 2004): Published as a 350-copy limited hardcover.
- Covenant by John Everson (November 2004): Published as a 250-copy limited hardcover.
- Sleepwalker by Michael Laimo (November 2004): Published as a 250-copy limited hardcover.
- Sympathy For The Devil: The Best of Hail Saten Vol. 1 by Brian Keene (December 2004): Published as a 150-copy limited hardcover.

=== 2005 ===
- City of the Dead by Brian Keene (January 2005): Published as a 26-copy leather-bound hardcover and a 300-copy limited hardcover.
- Scarecrow Gods by Weston Ochse (March 2005): Published as a 26-copy leather-bound hardcover and a 300-copy limited hardcover.
- Broken Angel by Brian Knight (May 2005): Published as a 26-copy leather-bound hardcover and a 300-copy limited hardcover.
- My Eyes are Nailed, but I Still See by David Niall Wilson and Brett Alexander Savory (July 2005): Published as a 220-copy limited hardcover. David Niall Wilson did a chapbook in late August 2005 to accompany this book, but it is not a Delirium publication.
- Vestal by Charlee Jacob (September 2005): Published as a 250-copy limited hardcover.
- Earthworm Gods by Brian Keene (September 2005): Published as a 400-copy limited hardcover.
- Earthworm Gods by Brian Keene (October 2005): Published as a 52-copy leather-bound hardcover.
- Deep Night by Greg F. Gifune (November 2005): Published as a 26-copy leather-bound hardcover and a 150-copy limited hardcover.
- Night of the Daemon: Night Trilogy Part 3 by Harry Shannon (December 2005): Published as a 26-copy leather-bound hardcover and a 174-copy limited hardcover.

=== 2006 ===
- Thirteen Specimens by Jeffrey Thomas (January 2006): Published as a 26-copy leather-bound hardcover and a 150-copy limited hardcover. The leather-bound hardcover was packaged with an exclusive 30-copy hardcover chapbook entitled Thirteen More Specimens.
- Running With The Devil: The Best of Hail Saten Vol. 2 by Brian Keene (January 2006): Published as a 150-copy limited hardcover.
- In Delirium edited by Brian Keene (January 2006): Published as a 26-copy leather-bound and a hardcover 274-copy limited hardcover.
- The Pines by Robert Dunbar (May 2006): Published as a 26-copy leather-bound hardcover and a 240-copy limited hardcover.
- Blindsided by Barry Hoffman (May 2006): Published as a 26-copy leather-bound hardcover (June 2006 and a 185-copy limited hardcover.
- Scary Rednecks and Other Inbred Horrors by Weston Ochse and David Whitman (June 2006): Published as a 220-copy limited hardcover.
- Hacks by Brian Knight (July 2006): Published as a 26-copy leather-bound hardcover (September 2006) and a 250-copy limited hardcover.
- His Pain by Wrath James White (November 2006): Published as a 245-copy limited hardcover.
- Demon! by William F. Nolan (November 2006): Published as a 250-copy limited hardcover. Reprint.
- Collected Tales of the Baja Express by Gene O'Neill (November 2006): Published as a 237-copy limited hardcover. Limited to preorders.
- Clickers by J. F. Gonzalez (December 2006): Published as a 344-copy limited hardcover. Limited to preorders.

=== 2007 ===
- The Rising: Death in Four Colors by Brian Keene (February 2007): Published as a 500-copy limited hardcover.
- Recalled to Life: The Cycle of the Aegis Trilogy Book 1 by Weston Ochse (September 2007): Published as a 52-copy leather-bound hardcover and a 500-copy limited hardcover.
- The Sinister Mr. Corpse by Jeff Strand (February 2007): Published as a 26-copy leather-bound hardcover (March 2007) and as a 250-copy limited hardcover.
- Ghoul by Brian Keene (March 2007): Published as a 52-copy leather-bound hardcover and a 400-copy limited hardcover.
- Sacrifice by John Everson (March 2007): Published as a 250-copy limited hardcover. Sequel to Covenant.
- Clickers II: The Next Wave by J. F. Gonzalez and Brian Keene (April 2007): Published as a 52-copy leather-bound hardcover and a 500-copy limited hardcover.
- The Shore by Robert Dunbar (May 2007): Published as a 52-copy leather-bound hardcover (June 2007) and a 500-copy limited hardcover.
- Demogorgon by Brian Lumley (May 2007): Published as a 26-copy leather-bound hardcover (June 2007) and a 300-copy limited hardcover.
- Dominion by Greg F. Gifune (June 2007): Published as a 275-copy limited hardcover.
- God's End by Michael McBride (June 2007): Published as a 52-copy leather-bound hardcover (July 2007) and a 500-copy limited hardcover.
- The New Fear: The Best of Hail Saten Vol. 3 by Brian Keene (July 2007): Published as a 150-copy limited hardcover.
- Dead Sea by Brian Keene (September 2007): Published as a 52-copy leather-bound hardcover (October 2007) and a 250-copy limited hardcover.
- In Delirium II edited by John Everson (December 2007): Published as a 26-copy leather-bound hardcover and a 274-copy limited hardcover.

=== 2008 ===
- The Infected by Michael McBride (February 2008): Published as a 26-copy leather-bound hardcover (April 2008) and a 300-copy limited hardcover.
- Blood in Electric Blue by Greg F. Gifune (March 2008): Published as a 26-copy leather-bound hardcover (May 2008) and as a 250-copy limited hardcover.
- Gleefully Macabre Tales by Jeff Strand (March 2008): Published as a 300-copy limited hardcover.
- Saying Uncle by Greg F. Gifune (June 2008): Published as a 150-copy limited hardcover. Reprint of December Girl Press trade paperback.
- Dead and Gone by Harry Shannon (August 2008): Published as a 150-copy limited hardcover and as a trade paperback in the Paperback Book Club.
- The Golden Thread: The Cycle of the Aegis Trilogy Book 2 by Weston Ochse (September 2008): Published as a 250-copy limited hardcover.
- Passenger by Ronald Damien Malfi (September 2008): Published as a 150-copy limited hardcover and as a trade paperback in the Paperback Book Club.
- Ghost Walk by Brian Keene (September 2008): Published as a 300-copy limited hardcover.
- Manhattan Grimoire by Sandy DeLuca (October 2008): Published as a 150-copy limited hardcover.

=== 2009 ===
- New Dark Voices 2 edited by Brian Keene (February 2009): Published as a 150-copy limited hardcover.
- Children of Chaos by Greg F. Gifune (February 2009): Published as a 150-copy limited hardcover.
- Bloodletting by Michael McBride (March 2009): Published as a 150-copy limited hardcover.
- Unhappy Endings by Brian Keene (April 2009): Published as a 300-copy limited hardcover.
- Benjamin's Parasite by Jeff Strand (May 2009): Published as a 150-copy limited hardcover.
- Reservoir Gods by Brian Knight (June 2009): Published as a 150-copy limited hardcover.
- Primitive by J. F. Gonzalez (July 2009): Published as a 150-copy limited hardcover.
- The Girl In The Woods by David Jack Bell (August 2009): Published as a 150-copy limited hardcover.
- From Ashes by Sandy DeLuca (September 2009): Published as a 150-copy limited hardcover.
- Long After Dark by Greg F. Gifune (October 2009): Published as a 150-copy limited hardcover.
- Devil-Tree by Steve Vernon (November 2009): Published as a 150-copy limited hardcover.

== Trade Paperbacks ==
- The Dead Inn edited by Shane Ryan Staley (January 2001): Published as a 500-copy trade hardcover. Delirium's first anthology.
- Heretics by Greg F. Gifune (August 2001): Published as a 250-copy limited trade paperback.
- "I'll Be Damned" by Shane Ryan Staley (September 2001): Published in September 2001 as a 250-copy limited trade paperback and a 500-copy trade paperback.
- 4 x 4 by Brian Keene, Geoff Cooper, Michael Oliveri and Michael T. Huyck Jr. (October 2001): Published as a 400-copy limited trade paperback. Initially, the printer balked at including the signature sheets, because the authors scrawled obscene messages on many of them.
- The House Spider and Other Strange Visitors by Kurt Newton (2002): Unknown print run.
- Demons, Freaks, and Other Abnormalities by Michael Laimo (2002): Unknown print run.
- I Love You and There is Nothing You Can Do About It by Gerard Houarner (2002): Unknown print run.
- Terror Incognita by Jeffrey Thomas (2003): Unknown print run.
- Up, Out of Cities that Blow Hot and Cold by Charlee Jacob (2003): Unknown print run.
- Dark Demons by Kurt Newton (March 2002): Published as a 500-copy trade paperback.
- Maternal Instinct by J. F. Gonzalez (April 2002): Published as a 500-copy trade paperback.
- Guises by Charlee Jacob (June 2002): Published as a 500-copy trade paperback.
- Host by Bryan Eytcheson (August 2005): Published as a 1500-copy trade paperback. First book in the Trade Paperback series.
- Fear of Gravity by Brian Keene (November 2005): Published as a 1500-copy trade paperback. Second book in the Trade Paperback series.
- Sympathy For The Devil: The Best of Hail Saten Vol. 1 by Brian Keene (January 2006): Published as a 1500-copy trade paperback. Third book in the Trade Paperback series.
- Slime After Slime: A Short Story Collection by Mark McLaughlin (May 2006): Published as a 1500-copy trade paperback. Fourth book in the Trade Paperback series.
- Deep Night by Greg F. Gifune (May 2006): Published as a 1500-copy trade paperback. Fifth book in the Trade Paperback series.
- Running With The Devil: The Best of Hail Saten Vol. 2 by Brian Keene (July 2007): Published as a 1500-copy trade paperback. Sixth book in the Trade Paperback series.
- No Further Messages by Brett Alexander Savory (November 2007): Published as a 1500-copy trade paperback. Seventh book in the Trade Paperback series.
- Oogie Boogie Central by M. Stephen Lukac (February 2008): Published as a 1500-copy trade paperback. Eighth book in the Trade Paperback series.
- The Rising: Selected Scenes from the End of the World by Brian Keene (July 2008): Published as a 1500-copy trade paperback. Ninth book in the Trade Paperback series.
- Clickers by J. F. Gonzalez and Mark Williams (July 2008): Published as a 1500-copy trade paperback. Tenth book in the Trade Paperback series.
- Saying Uncle by Greg F. Gifune (August 2008): Published as a 1500-copy trade paperback. Eleventh book in the Trade Paperback series.

=== Paperback Book Club ===
- The Bleeding Season by Greg F. Gifune (October 2007): First book in the Paperback Book Club. Reprints hardcover.
- Dreadful Delineations by John Maclay (November 2007): Second book in the Paperback Book Club. Reprints hardcover.
- Broken Angel by Brian Knight (December 2007): Third book in the Paperback Book Club. Reprints hardcover.
- The Condemned by David Jack Bell (January 2008): Fourth book in the Paperback Book Club. Reprints hardcover.
- Oogie Boogie Bounce by M. Stephen Lukac (February 2008): Fifth book in the Paperback Book Club. Original.
- Dominion by Greg F. Gifune (March 2008): Sixth book in the Paperback Book Club. Reprints hardcover.
- Daemon by Harry Shannon (April 2008): Seventh book in the Paperback Book Club. Reprints hardcover.
- Scarecrow Gods by Weston Ochse (May 2008): Eighth book in the Paperback Book Club. Reprints hardcover.
- Thirteen Specimens by Jeffrey Thomas (June 2008): Ninth book in the Paperback Book Club. Reprints hardcover.
- Clickers II: The Next Wave by J. F. Gonzalez and Brian Keene (July 2008): Tenth book in the Paperback Book Club. Reprints hardcover.
- Dead and Gone by Harry Shannon (August 2008): Eleventh book in the Paperback Book Club. Reprints hardcover.
- Passenger by Ronald Damien Malfi (September 2008): Twelfth book in the Paperback Book Club. Reprints hardcover.
- Manhattan Grimoire by Sandy DeLuca (October 2008): Thirteenth book in the Paperback Book Club. Reprints hardcover.
- New Dark Voices 2 edited by Brian Keene (February 2009): Fourteenth book in the Paperback Book Club. Reprints hardcover.
- Children of Chaos by Greg F. Gifune (February 2009): Fifteenth book in the Paperback Book Club. Reprints hardcover.

== Ultra Editions ==
Delirium publishes the Ultra Series, genuine leather books housed in a leather hinged box. Buyers have the option to personalize their copies by getting their names on a special "thanks" page from the author, as well as having their book personally inscribed. Only 26-36 copies are produced of each title.

- Mean Sheep by Tom Piccirilli (January 2003): Published as a 6-copy ultra hardcover, an early prototype for the Ultra Collector's series.
- The Rising by Brian Keene (April 2003): Published as a 6-copy ultra hardcover, an early prototype for the Ultra Collector's series.
- Book #1: Punktown by Jeffrey Thomas (May 2003): Published as a 26-copy ultra hardcover. Delirium's first official release in the Ultra Collector's series.
- Book #2: Broken On The Wheel Of Sex by Jack Ketchum (July 2003): Published as a 26-copy ultra hardcover.
- Book #3: The Logan Chronicles by William F. Nolan (October 2003): Published as a 26-copy ultra hardcover. Included a signed drawing by Nolan.
- Book #4: Sixteen Sucking Stories by Brian Lumley (January 2004): Published as a 35-copy ultra hardcover. Included an audio CD of Lumley reading "The Mirror of Nitocris".
- Book #5: Crota by Owl Goingback (May 2004): Published as a 26-copy ultra hardcover.
- Book #6: The Parasite by Ramsey Campbell (October 2004): Published as a 26-copy ultra hardcover.
- Book #7: Far Out: The Incredible Adventures of Sam Space by William F. Nolan (January 2005): Published as a 26-copy ultra hardcover.
- Book #8: My Soul to Keep by Tananarive Due (December 2006): Published as a 26-copy ultra hardcover.

== Dark Homage Series ==
=== Volume One: Lovecraft ===
- Book #1: Epiphany: A Flying Tiger's Story by Stephen Mark Rainey (September 2003): Published as a 100-copy limited hardcover.
- Book #2: The Seventh Victim by Charlee Jacob (November 2003): Published as a 100-copy limited hardcover.
- Book #3: The Man Who Killed Kew Gardens by Brain Lumley (January 2004): Published as a 100-copy limited hardcover.
- Book #4: The Arms of the Sun by Jeffrey Thomas (March 2004): Published as a 100-copy limited hardcover.
- Book #5: The God of Foulness by Matt Cardin (June 2004): Published as a 100-copy limited hardcover.
- Book #6: An Outsider by John Pelan (September 2004): Published as a 100-copy limited hardcover.

== Dark Essential Series ==
This series focuses on titles that have never before seen print in hardcover. In each limited-edition hardcover, Delirium includes special original bonus material not found in the original paperbacks. Each book is signed by the author and limited to no more than 200 copies.

At the end of each year, Delirium offers custom-made slipcases to house the entire volume of books. This slipcase features the Dark Essentials logo as well as the volume lineup.

=== Volume One ===
- Book #1: Dragonfly by Brian Knight (October 2003): Published as a 26-copy leather-bound hardcover and a 100-copy limited hardcover.
- Book #2: Hexes by Tom Piccirilli (December 2003): Published as a 26-copy leather-bound hardcover and 100-copy limited hardcover.

=== Volume Two ===
- Book #1: Soma by Charlee Jacob (February 2004): Published as a 15-copy leather-bound hardcover and a 150-copy limited hardcover.
- Book #2: Grave Markings by Michael Arnzen (April 2004): Published as a 15-copy leather-bound hardcover and a 150-copy limited hardcover.
- Book #3: Ravenous Ghosts by Kealan Patrick Burke (July 2004): Published as a 15-copy leather-bound hardcover and 150-copy limited hardcover.
- Book #4: The Many by David B. Silva (August 2004): Published as a 15-copy leather-bound hardcover and a 150-copy limited

hardcover.

- Book #5: The Deceased by Tom Piccirilli (October 2004): Published as a 15-copy leather-bound hardcover and a 150-copy

limited hardcover.

- Book #6: AAAIIIEEE!!! by Jeffrey Thomas (December 2004): Published as a 15-copy leather-bound hardcover and a 150-copy limited hardcover.

=== Volume Three ===
- Book #1: Hush by Tim Lebbon and Gavin Williams (April 2005): Published as a 200-copy limited hardcover.
- Book #2: Deathgrip by Brian Hodge (June 2005): Published as a 200-copy limited hardcover.
- Book #3: A Lower Deep by Tom Piccirilli (August 2005): Published as a 200-copy limited hardcover.
- Book #4: Prodigal by Melanie Tem (December 2005): Published as a 200-copy limited hardcover.
- Bonus Book: The Wishnik by Kurt Newton (October 2006): Offered free with subscription to the Dark Essentials, Vol. 3 series. Published as a 115-copy limited hardcover.

=== Volume Four ===
- Book #1: Excavation by Steve Rasnic Tem (August 2006): Published as a 200-copy limited hardcover.
- Book #2: Untigahunk: Stories and Myths of the Little Brothers by Rick Hautala (February 2007): Published as a 200-copy limited hardcover.
- Book #3: Prototype by Brian Hodge (September 2007): Published as a 200-copy limited hardcover
- Book #4: Demonologist by Michael Laimo (December 2007): Published as a 200-copy limited hardcover.

== Exclusives Series ==
Delirium Books Exclusive Series (known as the X-series) are extremely limited-edition hardcovers that are only sold in preorder, within a reservation period of 1–3 months. The total number of books ordered in the reservation period becomes the total print run.

- Book #1: Host by Bryan Eytcheson (January 2004): Published as a 50-copy limited hardcover.
- Book #2: Down To Sleep by Greg F. Gifune (May 2004): Published as a 77-copy limited hardcover.
- Book #3: Motivational Shrieker by Mark McLaughlin (September 2004): Published as an 82-copy limited hardcover.
- Book #4: Body Counting by David Whitman (April 2005): Published as a 92-copy limited hardcover.
- Book #5: Descent by Sandy Deluca (July 2005): Published as a 100-copy limited hardcover.
- Book #6: Slime After Slime: A Short Story Collection by Mark McLaughlin (November 2005): Published as a 100-copy limited hardcover.
- Book #7: The Dark Underbelly of Hymns by Martin Mundt (April 2006): Published as a 100-copy limited hardcover.
- Book #8: Jigsaw by Gord Rollo (October 2006): Published as a 100-copy limited hardcover.
- Book #9: No Further Messages by Brett Alexander Savory (November 2007): Published as a 100-copy limited hardcover.
- Book #10: The Condemned by David Jack Bell (November 2007): Published as a 100-copy limited hardcover.
- Book #11: Broken Shadows by Tim Waggoner (February 2009): Published as a 100-copy limited hardcover.

== Special Edition Series ==
- Book #1: A Puppet Show For No One by Jeffrey Thomas (March 2004): Published as a 26-copy leather-bound hardcover. Included a puppet by Jesse Wroblewski and Florence Ivy
- Book #2: Scary Rednecks: The Appalachian Omnibus by Weston Ochse and David Whitman (November 2004): Published as a 26-copy leather-bound hardcover.
- Book #3: The Doll Who Ate His Mother by Ramsey Campbell (September 2005): Published as a 26-copy leather-bound hardcover. Included a doll created by Jesse Wroblewski of Puppet Terrors and Florence Ivy.
- Book #4: The Rising: Selected Scenes From the End of the World by Brian Keene (March 2006): Published as a 32-copy leather-bound hardcover with two addition copies produced (one for the publisher and one for the author). Also published as a 500-copy limited hardcover (October 2007). A reprint trade paperback published in (July 2008).
- Book #5: Earthworm Gods: Selected Scenes from the End of the World by Brian Keene (July 2008): Published as a 32-copy leather-bound hardcover with two addition copies produced (one for the publisher and one for the author). Also the same month published as a 500-copy limited hardcover. A trade paperback was scheduled but cancelled before release.

== Chapbooks Series ==
Starting in the Fall of 2005, Delirium began publication of signed, limited hardcover chapbooks. As of September 2008, the Chapbook Series has been placed on hiatus.

- Book #1: Failure by John Everson (January 2006): Published as a 500-copy limited hardcover.
- Book #2: Imprint by Patrick Lestewka (June 2006): Published as a 500-copy limited hardcover.
- Book #3: Pickman's Motel by Mark McLaughlin (April 2007): Published as a 300-copy limited hardcover.
- Book #4: Blood Wish by Michael McBride (October 2007): Published as a 300-copy limited hardcover.
- Book #5: Divagations by John Maclay (May 2008): Published as a 300-copy limited hardcover.
- Book #6: Suckers: An Andrew Mayhem/ Harry McGlade Thriller by J. A. Konrath and Jeff Strand (May 2008): Published as a 300-copy limited hardcover.

== Subsidiary Presses ==
=== Corrosion Press ===
- Luster by Shane Ryan Staley (February 2002): Published as a trade paperback.
- Confessions of an Archivist by Patrick Lestewka (March 2003): Published as a trade paperback.
- Dead Santa by Shane Ryan Staley (December 2005): Published as a softcover chapbook.
- Corrosion: Volume 1 by Shane Ryan Staley (April 2006): Published as a trade paperback.
- Corrosion: Volume 1 by Shane Ryan Staley (June 2006): Published as a 150-copy limited hardcover.
- Where's Bin Laden? by Shane Ryan Staley (March 2007): Published as a 150-copy limited hardcover and as a trade paperback.
- Ugly Heaven, Beautiful Hell by Carlton Mellick III and Jeffrey Thomas (November 2007): Published as a 150-copy limited hardcover.
- Ugly Heaven, Beautiful Hell by Carlton Mellick III and Jeffrey Thomas (December 2007): Published as a trade paperback.
- Monster Behind the Wheel by Michael McCarty and Mark McLaughlin (September 2008): Published as a 150-copy limited hardcover.

=== December Girl Press ===
- Saying Uncle by Greg F. Gifune (February 2003): Published in as a trade paperback.
- Settling in Nazareth by Sandy DeLuca (August 2003): Published as a trade paperback.

=== Dimension House ===
==== The Godhead Trilogy ====
- Book #1: Towing Jehovah by James Morrow (March 2004): Published as a 26-copy leather-bound hardcover.
- Book #2: Blameless in Abaddon by James Morrow (May 2004): Published as a 26-copy leather-bound hardcover.
- Book #3: The Eternal Footman by James Morrow (July 2004): Published as a 26-copy leather-bound hardcover.
- Supplemental Volume: Reflections and Refractions by James Morrow (2004): Published as a 26-copy limited hardcover chapbook.

==== The Dreamlands Series ====
- Book #1: Hero of Dreams by Brian Lumley (October 2004): Published as a 52-copy leather-bound hardcover.
- Book #2: Ship of Dreams by Brian Lumley (February 2005): Published as a 52-copy leather-bound hardcover.
- Book #3: Mad Moon of Dreams by Brian Lumley (June 2005): Published as a 52-copy leather-bound hardcover.
- Book #4: Iced on Aran by Brian Lumley (December 2005): Published as a 52-copy leather-bound hardcover.
- Book #5: Questers for Kuranes: Two Tales of Hero and Eldin by Brian Lumley (April 2006): Published as a 52-copy leather-bound hardcover.
