= Harry Shannon =

Harry Shannon may refer to:

- Harry Shannon (actor) (1890–1964), American character actor
- Harry Shannon (songwriter) (born 1948), American songwriter
