= Necropolitan Press =

Defunct American specialty small press

- Status: Defunct in 2001, re-started in 2008
- Founded: 1993
- Founder: Jeffrey Thomas
- Country of origin: United States
- Headquarters location: Westborough, Massachusetts & New Paltz, New York
- Distribution: Worldwide
- Publication types: Limited edition books and magazines
- Fiction genres: Horror, Science fiction, Dark Fantasy, the Unclassifiable
- Official website: Necropolitan-Press.com

Necropolitan Press, founded in 1993 by editor and author Jeffrey Thomas, is an independent publisher in the genres of horror, science-fiction, dark fantasy, and "the Unclassifiable." Necropolitan Press ceased producing new releases in 2001.

In March 2008, it was announced that Necropolitan Press would be resuming a publication schedule, beginning with Paul G. Tremblay's The Harlequin & The Train novella.

== History ==
Jeffrey Thomas founded Necropolitan Press in 1993 in reaction to his discovery of the then-flourishing small press, causing him to become so enthused with the idea that he "developed the desire to produce some publication or other" of his own. Thomas chose the name for his publishing imprint due to the sound of it—fond of the similarity to the word Metropolitan but with a horrific bent. At the time, Thomas worked as a paste up artist in a print shop, allowing him to create the Necropolitan Press releases during his breaks by using a "light table to paste up the pages the old fashioned way, with an exacto knife and wax."

The initial publication from Necropolitan Press was The End magazine, which ran for four issues under the imprint with a fifth issue being released as a co-production with artist Jon C. Gernon's Zero Publishing. Throughout its run, this fiction anthology zine received newsstand distribution in addition to catalog sales, the internet—at the time—not being a viable distribution alternative. In 1995, Thomas would begin releasing single author and anthology chapbooks, starting with his own collection The Bones of the Old Ones and Other Lovecraftian Tales and averaging one non-magazine release per year. Necropolitan Press releases maintained low print runs; Jeff VanderMeer's The Hoegbotton Guide to the Early History of Ambergris, by Duncan Shriek, for instance, was produced in a 300-copy edition.

Necropolitan Press ceased producing new releases in 2001, the reasons being the press's financial drain on Thomas and the desire of Thomas to focus on his own work. Thomas would later lament this decision, stating that he "always had a great enthusiasm for publishing, [and that he] found it extremely rewarding to bring the work of other authors to the hands of readers eager for something a little out of the ordinary."

In December 2007, Thomas mentioned in an interview that Necropolitan Press may be resurrected with the help of Nick Curtis, whose involvement would alleviate the previous financial and time-related strains the venture placed on Thomas. Curtis was an enthusiast of Thomas's work who had created and maintained an official website for Thomas (including a blog and forum), all of which had revealed to Thomas "his [Curtis's] innovative approach to graphic design." According to Thomas, Curtis proposed the resurrection of Necropolitan Press. Officially, Thomas holds the position of "Publisher/Editorial Director" while Curtis is termed the "Assistant Publisher/Design Director".

Leading up to the resurrection, Thomas had "been talking to some very talented authors in regard to potential new projects." In March 2008, prior to the official announcement of the publishing imprint's return, Paul G. Tremblay mentioned that his forthcoming novella The Harlequin & The Train would be released on Necropolitan Press. In April 2008, Thomas made the official announcement of the press's return and of the forthcoming novella.

== Magazines published ==
The first project published by Necropolitan Press was The End magazine, which ran five issues at the rate of one a year starting in 1993. The fifth and final issue was produced in cooperation with New York–based artist Jon C. Gernon's Zero Publishing imprint, the Necropolitan Press designation used to denote editor Jeffrey Thomas's work on the title.

== Works published ==
=== 2008+ ===
The following is a list of all the Necropolitan Press anthology and single author collection titles announced/printed since the relaunch of the imprint in 2008.

Title	Author	Year	Length	ISBN
The Harlequin & the Train	Paul G. Tremblay	June 2009	155 pp	978-0-9818320-0-5
Limited to 400 trade paperback copies. An expanded edition of the short story bearing the same name.

=== 1995–2001 ===
The following is a list of all the Necropolitan Press anthology and single author collection titles printed during the initial years of the company. One additional title was announced, The Terrible Woman and Other Erotic Horrors by Scott Thomas, but this was withdrawn from the publishing schedule on May 5, 2001—the intended contents were later released in Nether: Improper Bedtime Stories as well as Shadows Of Flesh, both released by Delirium Books in 2004.

Title	Author	Year	Length
The Hoegbotton Guide to the Early History of Ambergris, by Duncan Shriek	Jeff VanderMeer	November 1999	84 pp
A tour guide through the dream city of Ambergris, presented as an actual "artifact" from Ambergris, builds upon the world introduced in Dradin, In Love: A Tale of Elsewhen & Otherwhere (Buzzcity Press, 1996). This chapbook was listed as one of the Books of the Year by acclaimed British author Brian Stableford in Vector, the critical journal of the British Science Fiction Association.
Terata: Anomalies of Literature	Jeffrey Thomas, ed.	1998	64 pp
A collection of horror and dark fantasy short fiction and poetry. Included the following authors: Deidrea Cox, James Doig, Todd H.C. Fischer, Valerie Hardin, Rod Heather, Jason Kuhl, Kurt Newton, David Rogers, Norman Rudnick, Robert Sagirs, Douglas M. Stokes, Mary Winters, MB. Wolf, and Thomas Zimmerman. Featuring artwork by: Jon C. Gernon, Jeffrey Thomas, Robert Thomas, and Curtis Wilcox. One of Kurt Newton's contributions received an Honorable Mention in The Year's Best Fantasy and Horror.
Tales Of Sesqua Valley	W. H. Pugmire	August 1997	66 pp
A collection of the dark fantasy and Lovecraftian horror by the widely-respected weird story-teller W. H. Pugmire. A second printing of the book was made, the sole difference being the cover stock: the first printing had a glossy white cover while the second printing had grainy gray cardstock cover.
A Vampire Bestiary	Jeffrey Thomas, ed.	1996	64 pp
A volume of seven unique and unexpected takes on the vampire tale... from the erotic to the gothic, from science-fiction to the Lovecraftian (Nyarlathotep as vampire). Included the following authors: James Ambuehl, Jeff Dennis, Joanne S. Kanarkiewicz, J. M. Rozanski, W. H. Pugmire, Margaret Smith, and Scott Thomas. Featuring artwork by: Lynn Aude, Doug Ferrin, Jon C. Gernon, Jeffrey Thomas, Scott Thomas, and Curtis Wilcox. Scott Thomas contribution received a recommendation from the Bram Stoker Awards.
The Bones of the Old Ones and Other Lovecraftian Tales	Jeffrey Thomas	1995	70 pp (first printing)
A collection of Lovecraft-inspired fiction and poetry. In January 1999, a second printing was offered that included four additional pages of artwork. The first printing had a glossy white cover while the second printing had a green cardstock cover. Three stories and one poem from this collection received Honorable Mentions in The Year's Best Fantasy and Horror: Ninth Annual Collection.
