= J. F. Gonzalez =

American novelist

Jesus F. Gonzalez
- Born: May 8, 1964; Inglewood, California, U.S.
- Died: November 10, 2014 (aged 50); Hershey, Pennsylvania, U.S.
- Occupations: Novelist, Public speaker
- Writing career
- Pen name: J. F. Gonzalez
- Genre: Horror
- Notable works: Clickers, Primitive

Jesus F. Gonzalez (May 8, 1964 – November 10, 2014) was an American author, primarily of horror fiction (writing under the pseudonym J. F. Gonzalez). He has written many notable novels and has done collaborations with Bram Stoker Award winners Mike Oliveri and Brian Keene. His novel Survivor has been optioned to be filmed by Chesapeake Films, and Clickers has been optioned by Cooked Goose Productions.

He primarily worked in the horror genre, with works published by such diverse companies as Leisure Books, Kensington Books, HarperCollins, Cemetery Dance Publications, Delirium Books, Bloodletting Press, and others. Ellen Datlow has listed his works in her "Recommended Reads" in her annual Year's Best Fantasy and Horror anthologies.

== Biography ==
J. F. Gonzalez was the author of several acclaimed novels of terror and suspense including Clickers (with Mark Williams), Clickers II: The Next Wave (with Brian Keene), Survivor, Bully, Fetish, and many others, as well as over 60 short stories and numerous articles.

Born in Inglewood, California, Jesus Gonzalez was raised in the nearby suburb of Gardena. Following graduation from high school, in 1982, he attended college, and then dropped in and out for the next several years before quitting for good in 1986. He has been a file clerk, a warehouse worker, a word processor, a computer graphic artist, a magazine editor, a freelance writer, an advertising copywriter, a secretary/administrative assistant, a database administrator, a web master, and an IT Help Desk technician.

== Death ==
On November 10, 2014, Gonzalez died of cancer. He lived in Lititz, Pennsylvania.

== Bibliography ==
=== The Clickers Series ===
1. Clickers (with Mark Williams) (1999)
2. Clickers II: The Next Wave (with Brian Keene) (2007)
3. Clickers III: Dagon Rising (with Brian Keene) (2010)
4. Clickers vs. Zombies (with Brian Keene) (2014)

=== Stand Alone Novels ===
- Conversion (2000)
- Shapeshifter (2003)
- Maternal Instinct (2002)
- Survivor (2004)
- Fetish (2005)
- The Beloved (2005)
- Bully (2006)
- Voyeur (as Angel Garcia) (2006)
- Hero (with Wrath James White) (2008)
- Primitive (2009)
- The Corporation (2010)
- Back From The Dead (2011)
- They (2013)
- The Killings (with Wrath James White) (2013)
- Retreat (2016) (released posthumously)

=== Collections ===
- Maternal Instinct (2002)
- Old Ghosts and Other Revenants (2002)
- When the Darkness Falls (2006)
- The Summoning and Other Eldritch Tales (2010)
- Libra Nigrum Scienta Secreta (The Black Book of Secret Knowledge) (with Brian Keene) (2015) Arcane Wisdom (Limited release)

=== Chapbooks ===
- That's All Folks! (2004)
- Restore From Backup - with Mike Oliveri (2007)
- Secrets (forthcoming, 2010)
- Do Unto Others (2010)
- It Drinks Blood (2011)

=== Anthologies edited ===
- Tooth and Claw (2002)
