= Greg F. Gifune =

US author

- Born: November 12, 1963 (age 62); Framingham, Massachusetts, U.S.
- Occupations: Novelist; short story writer; editor
- Writing career
- Genres: Horror fiction, Contemporary fantasy, Crime fiction
- Website: gregfgifune.com

Greg F. Gifune (born November 12, 1963, in Middlesex County, Massachusetts) is a horror author, the recipient of multiple Bram Stoker Award and International Horror Guild Award nominations in addition to one for the British Fantasy Award.

Christopher Rice calls Gifune, "The best writer of horror novels and supernatural thrillers at work today."

Gifune has written 17 novels, in addition to screenplays and published collections of short stories.

He is also the editor-in-chief of Thievin' Kitty Publications (Link) and the former editor—from 1998 to 2004—of the fiction magazine The Edge: Tales of Suspense (Link).

A full-time author and editor, Gifune resides in Marion, Massachusetts, with his wife Carol and a bevy of felines. As of 2011 he was living in Wareham, Massachusetts.

== Bibliography ==
Heretics (collection)

- Aug. 2001 50-copy Limited Edition Hardcover (Delirium Books)
- Aug. 2001 250-copy Limited Edition Trade Paperback (Delirium Books)

Drago Descending

- Nov. 2001 Trade Paperback (The Fiction Works)

Saying Uncle

- Feb. 2003 Trade Paperback (December Girl Press/Delirium Books)

Night Work

- March 2003 Trade Paperback (The Fiction Works)
- June 2004 Trade Paperback (BookSurge Publishing)

The Bleeding Season

- Oct. 2003 250-copy Limited Edition Hardcover (Delirium Books)

Down to Sleep (collection)

- May 2004 77-copy Limited Edition Hardcover (Delirium Books)

Deep Night

- Oct. 2005 26-copy Deluxe Edition Hardcover (Delirium Books)
- Oct. 2005 150-copy Limited Edition Hardcover (Delirium Books)
- June 2006 Trade Paperback (Delirium Books)

A View from the Lake

- Jan. 2006 Trade Paperback (Blindside Publishing)

Dominion

- Jun. 2007 275-copy Limited Edition Hardcover (Delirium Books)

Blood in Electric Blue

- 2008 Hardcover (Delirium Books)
- Feb. 2009 Trade Paperback (Delirium Books)

Judas Goat

- 2008 Limited Edition Hardcover (Morning Star)
- Oct. 2010 E-Book (DarkFuse)

Children of Chaos

- 2009 Hardcover and Trade Paperback (Delirium Books).

Kingdom of Shadows

- Dec. 2009 E-Book (DarkFuse)
- 2009 Trade Paperback (Delirium Books)
- Jan. 2010 Limited Edition Hardcover (Delirium Books)

Sorcerer

- Oct. 2010 E-Book(DarkFuse)

Long After Dark

- Feb. 2010 Limited Edition Hardcover (Delirium Books)
- Jun. 2013 Trade Paperback (Delirium Books)

Gardens of Night

- Jan. 2010 Signed Limited Edition Hardcover (Uninvited Books)
- Oct. 2010 Trade Paperback (Uninvited Books)

Catching Hell

- May 2010 Hardcover (Cemetery Dance Publications)
- Nov. 2011 E-Book (Samhain Publishing)

The Living and the Dead

- 2010 Signed Limited Edition Hardcover (Delirium Books)
- Jun. 2013 E-Book (DarkFuse)

Dreams the Ragman

- 2011 Hardcover (Delirium Books)

Midnight Solitaire

- Aug. 2011 Hardcover (Delirium Books)

Lords of Twilight

- Dec. 2011 E-Book(DarkFuse)
- 2012 Hardcover (Delirium Books)

Apartment Seven

- 2011 Hardcover (Delirium Books)
- Jan. 2014 E-Book(DarkFuse)

== See also ==
- List of horror fiction authors
