= Michael Oliveri =

American novelist

Michael Oliveri is the Bram Stoker Award-winning author of Deadliest of the Species. His work has appeared in several anthologies and magazines including A Walk on the Darkside, New Dark Voices, The Best of Horrorfind, and the upcoming In Laymon’s Terms. He is one of the collaborators on the fan-favorite 4×4 collection with Brian Keene, Geoff Cooper, and Michael T. Huyck Jr. Oliveri wrote the comic Werewolves: Call of the Wild from Moonstone Books.

== Bibliography ==
Books

- Deadliest of the Species (2001)
- The Pack: Winter Kill (2009)

Collections

- 4 × 4 (2001) (with Geoff Cooper, Michael T Huyck, Brian Keene)
- New Dark Voices (2004) (with Gene O'Neill and John Urbancik)
- Muy Mal co-written with John Urbancik, and Weston Ochse
- Inazuma free short story

== Awards ==
Bram Stoker Award First Novel winner (2002): Deadliest of the Species

== Personal information ==
- Mike currently resides near Peoria, IL
- Mike studies Shuri-ryū karate under Sensei Trent Miller and Shihan Joseph Walker

== See also ==
- List of horror fiction authors
