= Jeffrey Thomas (writer) =

American science fiction and horror writer

- Born: October 3, 1957 (age 68)
- Occupation: Writer
- Writing career
- Genres: Science fiction, horror
- Website: www.facebook.com/jeffrey.thomas.71

Jeffrey Thomas (born October 3, 1957) is a prolific writer of science fiction and horror, best known for his stories set in the nightmarish future city called Punktown, such as the novel Deadstock (Solaris Books) and the collection Punktown (Ministry of Whimsy Press), from which a story was reprinted in St. Martin's The Year's Best Fantasy and Horror #14. His fiction has also been reprinted in Daw's The Year's Best Horror Stories XXII, The Year's Best Fantastic Fiction and Quick Chills II: The Best Horror Fiction from the Specialty Press. He has been a 2003 finalist for the Bram Stoker Award (Best First Novel) for Monstrocity, and a 2008 finalist for the John W. Campbell Award for Deadstock.

Other books by Thomas include the novels Letters from Hades (Bedlam Press) and Monstrocity (Prime Books), and the novella Godhead Dying Downwards (Earthling Publications). The German edition of Punktown has cover art by H. R. Giger.

Thomas is also responsible for Necropolitan Press, an independent publisher in the genres of horror, science fiction, dark fantasy, and "the unclassifiable.", which was founded in 1993 and ceased production between 2001 and March 2008.

== Personal life ==
Jeffrey Thomas lives in Northbridge, Massachusetts with his daughter Jade. His brother Scott is also an accomplished short story writer, collected in such books as Cobwebs and Whispers (Delirium Books) and Westermead (Raw Dog Screaming Press).

== Punktown ==
=== Setting ===
Punktown is a far future megalopolis, infamous for its level of crime. Originally given the name Paxton, it is described as “a vast city established by Earth on the planet Oasis but since colonized by numerous other races as well. Even the Chooms, who had lived here before the first Earth people, had come to refer to the city by its nickname of Punktown.” Besides the indigenous Choom, human in appearance aside from wide mouths cut back to their ears, the stories often include or focus on a variety of alien races, clones, mutants, and sentient machines. The stories tend to feature common citizens as their protagonists, rather than the larger-than-life heroes of cliché science fiction, an exception being mutant private eye Jeremy Stake, protagonist of the novels Deadstock and Blue War. Beyond their grounding in science fiction, Punktown stories also notably combine elements of horror, fantasy and occasionally detective noir.

Thomas has related in interviews that he first devised the city in 1980, with a handful of short stories appearing in small press publications before the collection Punktown was released in 2000. The Punktown stories are sometimes cited as early examples of the New Weird subgenre; Paul Di Filippo in Asimov's describing the initial collection as "a harbinger of the New Weird... Not that the concept of Punktown really needs any shoring-up by cliques or claques."

Foreign language editions of a number of Punktown books have appeared in Germany, Russia, Poland, and Greece. Three collections of audio adaptations created by the German company Lausch.

== Works ==
=== Punktown (series) ===
==== Novels ====
- Monstrocity (May 2003, Prime Books, 236 pages, reprinted as an ebook in Anarchy Books 2011)
- Everybody Scream! (August 2004, Raw Dog Screaming Press, 291 pages)
- Deadstock (February 2007, Solaris Books, 416 pages)
- Blue War (February 2008, Solaris Books, 416 pages)
- Health Agent (2008, Raw Dog Screaming Press)
- The New God (October 2024, Weird House Press, 221 pages)

==== Novella ====
- Red Cells (novella) (March 2014, DarkFuse)

==== Collections ====
- Punktown (collection) (June 2000, Ministry of Whimsy Press; expanded edition July 2003; further expanded edition Forma Street Press 2018)
- Voices from Punktown (collection) (2008, Dark Regions Press, 208 pages)
- Ghosts of Punktown (April 2014, Dark Regions Press)

==== Anthologies ====
- Punktown: Third Eye edited by Jeffrey Thomas, (2004, Prime Books, 162 pages)
- Punktown: Shades of Grey, made up of stories by both Jeffrey and Scott Thomas) (anthology) (2005, Bedlam Press/Necro Publications, 238 pages)
- Transmissions from Punktown, edited by Brian M. Sammons (Dark Regions Press, 2018)

=== Hades (series) ===
==== Novels ====
- Letters From Hades (March 2003, Bedlam Press, 240 pages)
- The Fall of Hades (2010, Dark Regions Press)

==== Novella ====
- Beautiful Hell (2011, Dark Regions Press, originally published in the anthology Ugly Heaven, Beautiful Hell, Dec. 2007, Corrosion Press, 276 pages, alongside a novella by Carlton Mellick III.)
- The Half-Damned Girl (2023, Weird House Press)

==== Collection ====
- Voices from Hades (2008, Dark Regions Press, 169 pages)

=== Collections ===
- Terror Incognita (March 2000, Delirium Books, 158 pages) (2003 trade paperback reprint without story notes)
- AAAIIIEEE!!! (January 2002, iUniverse, 212 pages)
- Nether: Improper Bedtime Stores (with Scott Thomas) (June 2004, Delirium Books)
- Honey Is Sweeter Than Blood (June 2004, Delirium Books) (containing Thomas' contributions to Nether)
- Unholy Dimensions (2005, Mythos Books, 288 pages)
- Thirteen Specimens (Feb. 2006, Delirium Books, 291 pages)
- Doomsdays (Oct. 2007, Dark Regions Press, 264 pages)
- Nocturnal Emissions (Jul. 2010, Dark Regions Press, 198 pages)
- Encounters with Enoch Coffin (with W. H. Pugmire) (April 2013, Dark Regions Press, 202 pages)
- Worship the Night (October 2013, Dark Renaissance Books, 194 pages)
- The Endless Fall (February 2017, Lovecraft eZine Press, 238 pages)
- Haunted Worlds (August 2017, Hippocampus Press, 248 pages)
- The Unnamed Country (November 2019, Word Horde, 207 pages)
- Carrion Men (December 2020, Plutonian Press, 221 pages)
- Gods of a Nameless Country (March 2024, JournalStone, 158 pages)
- The Return of Enoch Coffin (October 2025, Weird House Press, 263 pages)

=== Novels ===
- The Arms of the Sun (March 2004, Delirium Books, 67 pages)
- Boneland (July 2004, Bloodletting Press, 167 pages)
- A Nightmare on Elm Street: The Dream Dealers (July 2006, Black Flame, 416 pages)
- Thought Forms (2009, Dark Regions Press)
- Beyond the Door (April 2011, Delirium Books, 120 pages)
- The Sea of Flesh and Ash (with Scott Thomas) (May 2011, Terradan Works)
- Blood Society (2011, Necro Publications)
- Lost in Darkness (January 2012, Bad Moon Books)
- Subject 11 (February 2012, Delirium Books)
- The American (October 2020, JournalStone)
- The Spirit of Place (December 2023, Earthling Publications, 112 pages)
- The Exploded Soul (March 2024, Weird House Press, 204 pages)
- The Nought (June 2025, Weird House Press, 218 pages)
- The Idol (August 2025, Forma Street Press, 259 pages)

=== Chapbooks ===
- The Bones of the Old Ones and Other Lovecraftian Tales (1995, chapbook, Necropolitan Press, 70 pages)
  - second printing in 1999 with four extra pages
- Black Walls, Red Glass (Sept. 1997, Marietta Publishing, 66 pages)
- Avatars of the Old Ones: Mythos Tales (1999, chapbook, Imelod Publications, 48 pages)
- These Are The Exhibits (2003, Camelot Books & Gifts, 8 pages)
- Godhead Dying Downwards (May 2003, Earthling Publications, 40 pages)
- Unknown Pleasures: Dark Erotica (with Mark Howard Jones) (July 2003, Raw Dog Screaming Press, 48 pages)
- A Puppet Show For No One (March 2004, Delirium Books)
- Ghosts in Amber (June 2015, Dim Shores)
- Scenes From a Village (October 2021, Oddness)
- Shadowflowers (July 2026, Rapture Publishing)

=== Anthologies edited by ===
- A Vampire Bestiary (1996, Necropolitan Press)
- Terata: Anomalies of Literature (1999, Necropolitan Press)

=== Collections edited by ===
- A House of Hollow Wounds by Joseph S. Pulver, Hippocampus Press 2015
