= Jones' Fantastic Museum =

Museum in Washington, United States

Jones' Fantastic Museum was a family-oriented museum filled with a unique collection of eccentric inventions, strange sideshow attractions, old-time dime museum machines and antique exhibits. It was originally located in Snohomish County, but was later moved to Seattle, Washington, United States, from 1963 to 1980. It was created by avid collector Walt a.k.a. Doc Jones.

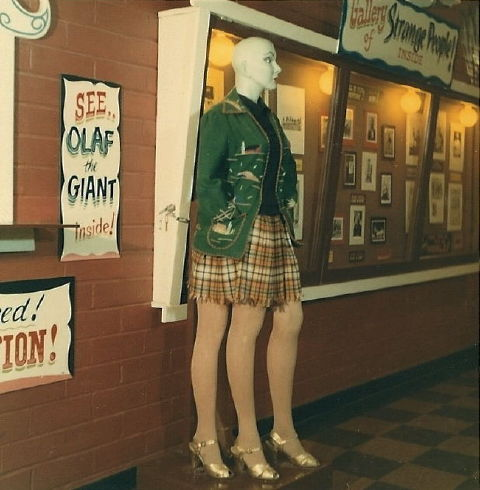
The Three-legged Lady standing outside the museum entrance.

== Early history ==
In 1959, Jones and his wife Dorothy opened up a museum on Gunnysack Hill, a mile-long section of U.S. Route 99 just north of Lynnwood, Washington. This first museum was also named Jones' Fantastic Museum.

Many Jones pieces formed a popular attraction at the 1962 Seattle World's Fair. The collection subsequently found a home on the balcony level (third floor) of the former Food Circus (now Center House) in the Seattle Center. Called Jones' Fantastic Show when it first opened on Saturday, October 5, 1963, the Seattle museum was renamed Jones' Fantastic Museum sometime after the Gunnysack Hill museum closed.

After discovering an abandoned log cabin on the family property in 1963, Walter and Dorothea Jones began construction on Rusty Gulch, a replica ghost town. Rusty Gulch had a full-length street with a saloon, jail, barber shop, and general store. When word spread, he opened the highway 99 museum, where he moved Rusty Gulch and a multitude of contraptions. Of his work, Walter Jones said: "I'm just trying to bring back some of the glamour, illusion and fakery of the old time medicine man shows and carnival sideshows".

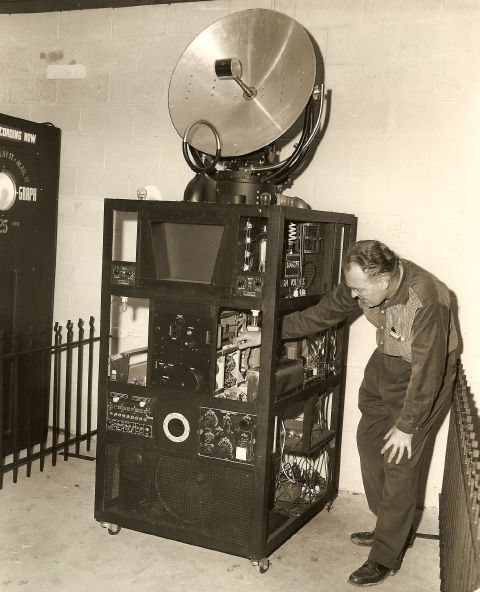
Museum founder Walt aka Doc Jones examining his Man From Mars Machine.

== Exhibits and attractions ==
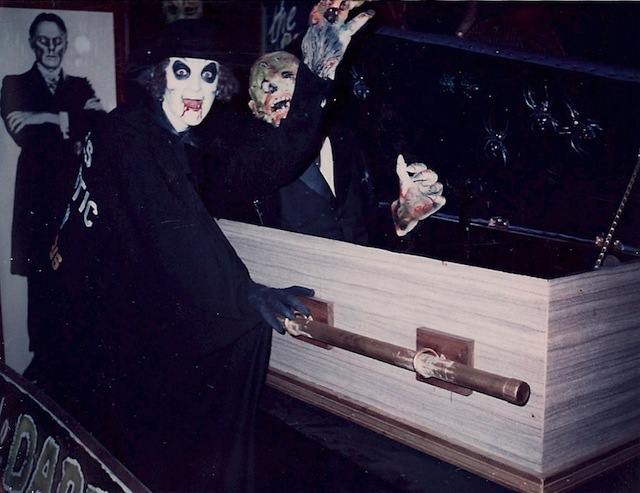
Count Pugsly (W.H. Pugmire) and the Thing

Displayed outside the entrance to the museum were many old pictures of sideshow freaks and human oddities. The Okeh Laughing Record, a 1923 recording of a man and woman laughing while a musician plays a funereal trumpet solo, played in a continuous loop along with a recording of Jones as a sideshow barker, enticing people to enter.

For 13 years the museum featured a man dressing as a vampire named Count Pugsly who roamed around scaring children and adults alike, even outside the museum. The role of the vampire was played by W. H. Pugmire. Sometimes, Pugmire would stand still, pretending to be a mannequin, standing still until an unsuspecting visitor stepped in front of him. As soon as the realization struck the visitor that no activating floor mat was there, he would walk towards them, often eliciting loud screams of fright.

The museum included a collection of funhouse mirrors, mannequins sporting extra legs and arms, a "Death Ray" machine, Sally Rand's dancing slippers, a long row of electronic switches that randomly activated a variety of automatons, a nine-foot-tall "mummified Viking" called Olaf the Giant, and a talking skull wearing a Hitler moustache that loudly spouted gibberish in German. Jones had sped up an actual recording of Hitler, giving his speech a cartoonish quality. The sign in front of the skull read "Hitler is Alive!"

An especially memorable item was the Laughing Lady, dubbed Laffing Sal by her manufacturer. She rocked back and forth laughing uncontrollably with her arms and legs swinging wildly whenever someone stepped on a floor mat in front of her glass and wood case. More exhibits appear in the list of items below.

== Later history ==
Doc Jones committed suicide in the early 1970s. In 1973, the third floor of the Food Circus was being renovated, so Jones' heirs moved a greatly downsized version of the museum into the basement. Much smaller than before, it remained there until 1980. Two years later, the entire collection was donated to Seattle Children's Hospital per Jones' will. The will stipulated that if the contents of the museum were ever sold, they must be sold as a whole and not broken up.

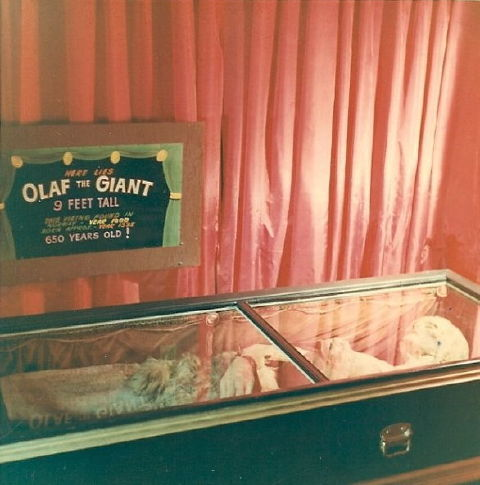
Olaf the Giant statue in its coffin

The hospital put the collection up for sale in 1984. After searching one year for a buyer, museum broker Bill Zimmerman found collector Jim Schmit of Oregon. According to Zimmerman, the sale "was difficult because the items were so diverse and bizarre and because the hospital wanted to sell it in its entirety."

Schmit, already known to Southern Oregonians for gathering together the world's largest collection of antique outhouses, purchased the entire collection for an undisclosed amount, in partnership with his former neighbor and friend, Baltimore businessman Ralph Bothne.

As of late 1985, much of the Jones collection formed part of the Lakeview Fantastic Museum, located in the small Southern Oregon town of Lakeview on U.S. Route 395 near the California border. For some reason—perhaps a dearth of visitors due to the remote location—by 1991 Schmit had moved his museum to a more prominent location in Redmond, Oregon. Renamed the World Famous Fantastic Museum, it opened in June 1991.

There is evidence to suggest that the museum's relationship with Redmond city planners was always contentious. Schmit's putting up a Ferris wheel on the property may have led directly to the closing of the popular and successful museum in 1996.

In May 1997, Schmit opened up the Museum of the Fantastic in Sisters, Oregon. Containing only 10% of his collection, it was shut down less than two years after it opened.

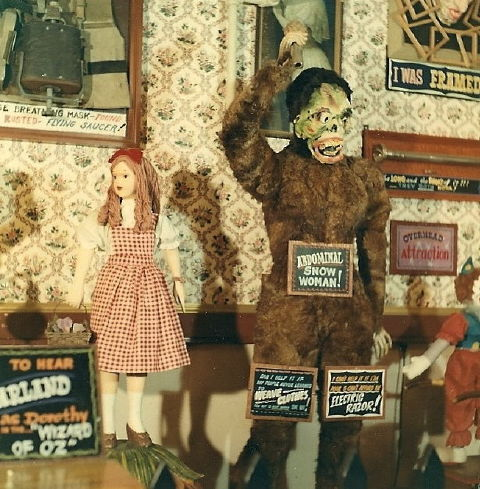
The Abdominal Snow Woman guards Dorothy from the Wizard of Oz.

== Breakup of the collection ==
At some point, perhaps around the time the Redmond museum opened, another museum containing a portion of the Jones collection opened in Yakima, Washington. The existence of this other museum, which was hundreds of miles from Redmond, may have marked the beginning of the dissolution of the Jones collection. However, the two collections were still displayed under one name: World Famous Fantastic Museum.

In 1993, Doug Higley received on loan several of Jones' pieces from both of the museums for his True Wonders Old Time Museum at Lake Tahoe in California. Sharing Jones' passion for sideshows, freaks and oddities, Higley invested a large amount of time and effort into his Tahoe museum. Despite his great care and attention to detail, Higley's museum only lasted about a year. Visitors to the area instead spent their money in the casinos adjacent to the museum.

== List of items ==
- "Abdominal" Snow Woman
- Amazing Mechanical Jazz Band
- Baseball coin-op game
- Bicycle air conditioner
- Blow torch/hot air machine for politicians
- "Captain Hook's hook"
- Chamber of Horrors
- Coin-op game with machine guns that blast Nazi warplanes
- Counterfeiter's workshop
- Four-legged lady
- Frankenstein in a bird cage
- Germ Killer mallet
- Hall of funhouse mirrors
- "Hitler is Alive!" talking skull
- Human skeleton in a display case
- Inhuman Head (in barber shop box)
- Jules Verne death ray machine
- Laughing Lady
- Life-size elephant automaton
- Man from Mars Machine
- Manley Model 49 popcorn maker
- Olaf the Giant
- Petrified Space Man
- Photo gallery of sideshow freaks
- Pianotainer player piano
- Quartet of musical monkeys
- Sally Rand's dancing slippers
- Shoot the Bear coin-op game
- Spiked chair "where Mahatma Gandhi sat for inspiration"
- Two-headed lady
- Voice-O-Graph recording machine
