= Brian Hodge =

American novelist

- Occupations: Novelist; essayist; music journalist; musician
- Writing career
- Genres: horror, crime
- Website: www.brianhodge.net

Brian Hodge is a writer of horror & crime. He lives in Boulder, Colorado.

Brian Hodge's novels are often dark in nature, containing themes such as self-sacrifice. He often explores unique belief systems in his stories.

He has been nominated for numerous awards, and won the International Horror Guild Award for best short fiction.

== Bibliography ==
=== Novels ===
- Dark Advent (Pinnacle, 1988) ISBN 1-55817-088-X
- Oasis (Tor Books, 1989) ISBN 0-8125-1900-0
- Nightlife (Dell, 1991) ISBN 0-440-20754-1
- Deathgrip (Dell, 1992, paperback and Delirium Books, 2005, hardcover) ISBN 0-440-21112-3
- The Darker Saints (Dell, 1993) ISBN 0-440-21113-1
- Prototype (Dell, 1996, and Delirium Books, 2007, hardcover) ISBN 0-7615-6219-2
- Wild Horses (William Morrow & Co., 1999, hardcover and Ballantine, 2000, paperback) ISBN 0-345-43810-8
- Hellboy: On Earth As It Is In Hell (Pocket Books, 2005) ISBN 1-4165-0782-5
- World of Hurt (Earthling Publications, 2006) ISBN 0-9766339-7-3
- Mad Dogs (Cemetery Dance Publications, 2007) ISBN 1-58767-149-2
- Dawn of Heresies (Onyx Path Publishing, 2016)
- The Immaculate Void (ChiZine Publications, 2018 ISBN 9781771484374

=== Novellas and novelettes ===
- Without Purpose, Without Pity (Delirium Books, 2012)
- Whom The Gods Would Destroy (Darkfuse, 2013)
- Dark City: A Novella Collection (with Gerard Daniel Houarner) (Necro Publications, 2015)
- The Weight of the Dead (Tor Books, 2016)
- I'll Bring You the Birds From Out of the Sky (Cemetery Dance Publications, 2017)

=== Short fiction collections ===
- Shrines & Desecrations (TAL Publications, 1994)
- The Convulsion Factory (Silver Salamander, 1996)
- Falling Idols (Silver Salamander, 1998)
- Lies & Ugliness (Night Shade Books, 2002)
- World of Hurt (Earthling Publications, 2006)
- Picking the Bones (Cemetery Dance Publications, 2011)
- Skidding Into Oblivion (ChiZine Publications, 2019)
- Black Hole Sundown (Cemetery Dance Publications, 2026)
