= Weston Ochse =

American author and educator (1965–2023)

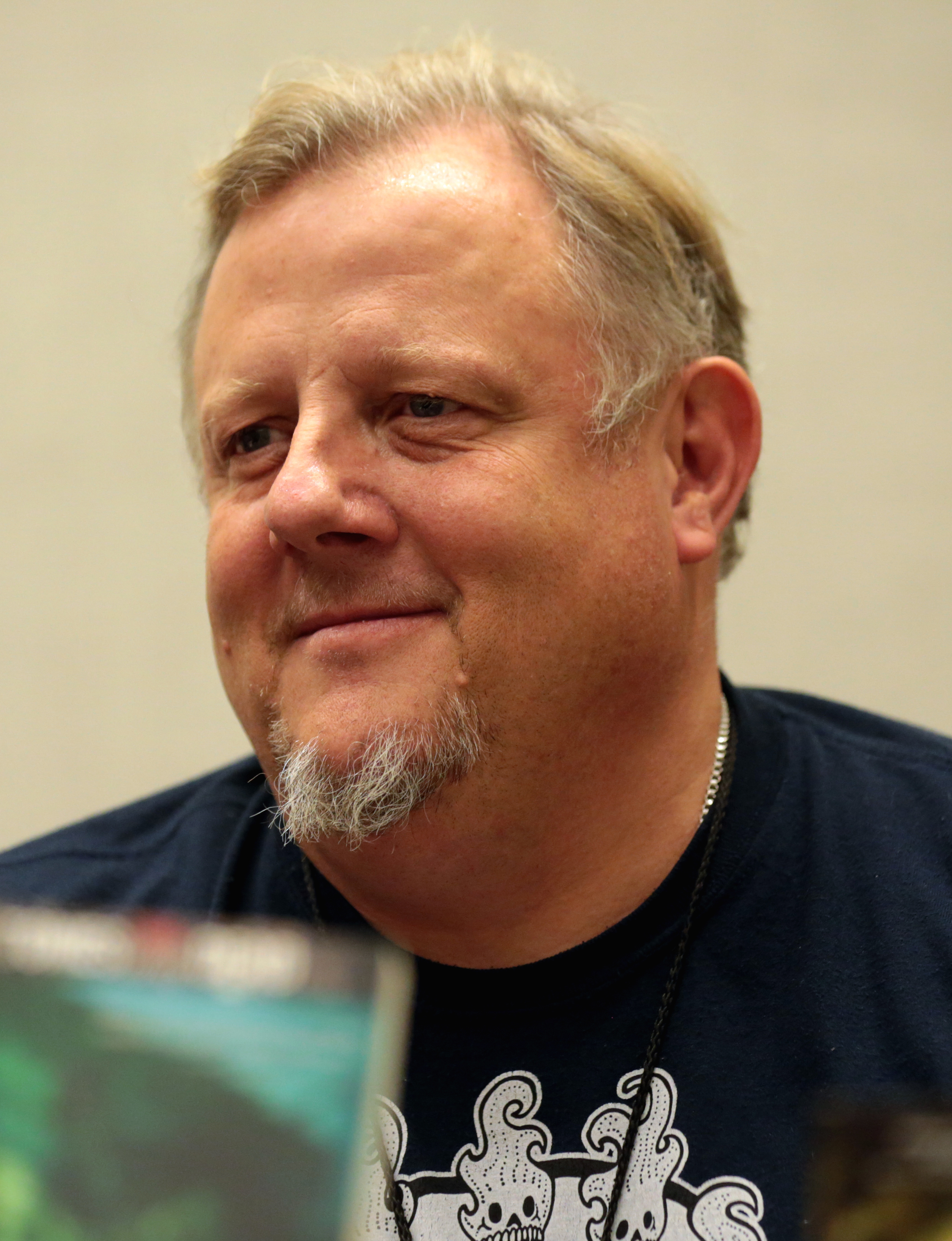
- Ochse at the 2017 Phoenix Comicon
- Born: June 20, 1965; Gillette, Wyoming, U.S.
- Died: November 18, 2023 (aged 58)
- Education: Excelsior University (BA); National University (MFA)
- Occupation: Author
- Partner: Yvonne Navarro
- Writing career
- Genres: Horror, fantasy, science fiction, military fiction, thriller fiction, literary fiction
- Notable works: Scarecrow Gods, SEAL Team 666, Grunt Life, Infiltrator, Rift War
- Notable awards: Bram Stoker Award and New Mexico Arizona Book Awards
- Website: westonochse.com

Weston Ochse (June 20, 1965 – November 18, 2023) was an American author and educator. He won the Bram Stoker Award for Best First Novel and was nominated for the Pushcart Prize for his short fiction. He also wrote several Alien novels for Titan Books, in particular Infiltrator.

== Biography ==
=== Early life ===
Weston Ochse was born in Gillette, Wyoming. By the time he was ten years old, he'd lived in ten states including South Dakota, Colorado, Nebraska, Ohio, New Jersey and Tennessee. He spent the greater part of his childhood in Chattanooga, Tennessee, where he graduated from Tyner High School. He enlisted in the U.S. Army after high school and became an intelligence officer. He was stationed in the Republic of Korea, Fort Jackson, Fort Gordon, Fort Bragg, Fort Carson, Fort Huachuca, Presidio of Monterey and Los Angeles Air Force Base. He retired from the U.S. Army in 2004 with an Honorable Discharge.

=== Career ===
Weston began writing professionally in 1997. He won the Bram Stoker Award for his first novel, Scarecrow Gods, in 2005. He was later nominated for a Pushcart Prize, and received five additional Bram Stoker Award nominations, won four New Mexico-Arizona Book Awards, with five total nominations.

Weston's work has appeared in comic books (IDW Publishing and DC Comics), professional writing guides, magazines, anthologies, as well as his own novels. He was widely reviewed and was hailed by his contemporaries as "one of the few new writers who will help redefine the field of dark literature for the future" (Edward Lee (writer)).

In 2002, an independent film company attempted to create a feature film based on his short story "Catfish Gods" (appeared in Scary Rednecks and Other Inbred Horrors). The film reached primary shooting before it folded.

In 2013, MGM optioned the film rights to SEAL Team 666 from MacMillan Films Division. Dwayne Johnson has attached himself to the film to executive produce as well as act in a leading role. His company, Seven Bucks Productions, which he owns alongside Dany Garcia, has the shopping agreement and is actively seeking interest. SEAL Team 666 and the ensuing books was inspired by the U.S. Navy SEAL take down of Osama Bin Laden and the idea of "What if there's an even more special SEAL Team that protects America from supernatural attack".

In 2017, he appeared in a DC Comics Special, DC House of Horror Vol 1, where he wrote a story about a possessed Shazam.

Weston held a Bachelor of Arts in American Literature from Excelsior University and a Master of Fine Arts in Creative Writing from National University. He traveled extensively to book signings and conventions where he served as Gross Out Contest bouncer, toastmaster and guest of honor. He was a frequent speaker at libraries and schools. He was an adjunct faculty member for Cochise Community College, and associate professor for Southern New Hampshire University, and had run the online Guerrilla Fiction Writing Workshop.

He lived in Tucson, Arizona with his wife, and fellow author, Yvonne Navarro.

=== Death ===
Ochse died on November 18, 2023.

== Awards ==
- 2002 Appalachian Galapagos Short Story Collection (Nominated for the Pushcart Prize)
- 2005 Scarecrow Gods (Won Bram Stoker Award for Best First Novel)
- 2008 Redemption Roadshow (Finalist for the Bram Stoker Award for Long Fiction)
- 2009 The Crossing of Aldo Ray (Finalist for the Bram Stoker Award for Short Fiction)
- 2011 Multiplex Fandango (Finalist for the Bram Stoker Award for Collection)
- 2012 Righteous (Finalist for the Bram Stoker Award for Short Fiction)
- 2013 SEAL Team 666 (Won New Mexico-Arizona Book Award for Adventure/Drama Novel)
- 2014 Age of Blood (Won New Mexico-Arizona Book Award for SF/Fantasy Novel)
- 2015 Reign of Evil (Won New Mexico-Arizona Book Award for Adventure/Drama Novel)
- 2019 Burning Sky (Won New Mexico-Arizona Book Award for Adventure/Drama Novel)
- 2020 Dead Sky (Finalist for the New Mexico-Arizona Book Award for Adventure/Drama Novel)

== Comics ==
- 2005 The Keep #2 (IDW) (short story Blue Heeler appeared in the back)
- 2005 Shadowplay #2 (IDW) (short story Blue Heeler appeared in the back)
- 2005 Shaun of the Dead #5 (IDW) (short story Blue Heeler appeared in the back)
- 2005 Angel: The Curse #5 (IDW) (short story Blue Heeler appeared in the back)
- 2005 CSI: New York – Bloody Murder #4 (IDW) (short story Blue Heeler appeared in the back)
- 2017 Hellboy: An Assortment of Horrors (IDW) (short story The Other Government Guys)
- 2017 DC House of Horror Vol 1 (DC) (Shazam Origin Story)

== Bibliography ==
Novels

- 2005 Scarecrow Gods Delirium Books 300 Limited Edition HB
- 2005 Scarecrow Gods Delirium Books 26 Deluxe Edition HB
- 2007 Scarecrow Gods Delirium Books, Trade-paperback
- 2007 Recalled to Life Delirium Books 300 Limited Edition HB
- 2007 Recalled to Life Delirium Books 26 Deluxe Edition HB
- 2008 The Golden Thread Delirium Books 300 Limited Edition HB
- 2008 The Golden Thread Delirium Books 26 Deluxe Edition HB
- 2009 Blaze of Glory Bloodletting Press 300 Limited Edition HB
- 2010 Empire of Salt Abaddon Books Trade-paperback
- 2011 Blood Ocean Abaddon Books Trade-paperback
- 2011 Velvet Dogma Crossroads Press, eBook Only
- 2011 Blaze of Glory Crossroads Press, eBook
- 2012 Babylon Smiles Crossroads Press, eBook Only
- 2012 SEAL Team 666 Thomas Dunne Books Hardback
- 2012 SEAL Team 666 Titan Books Trade-paperback
- 2013 Ghost Heart with Yvonne Navarro Dark Regions Press Trade-paperback
- 2013 Age of Blood Thomas Dunne Books Hardback
- 2013 Age of Blood Titan Books Trade-paperback
- 2014 Reign of Evil Thomas Dunne Books Hardback
- 2014 Reign of Evil Titan Books Trade-paperback
- 2014 Halfway House Journalstone Books Hardback
- 2014 Halfway House Journalstone Books Trade-paperback
- 2014 Grunt Life Solaris Books Mass Market Paperback
- 2015 Grunt Traitor Solaris Books Mass Market Paperback
- 2017 Grunt Hero Solaris Books, Mass Market Paperback
- 2018 Burning Sky Solaris Books, Mass Market Paperback
- 2019 Dead Sky Solaris Books, Mass Market Paperback
- 2020 Bone Chase Simon & Schuster, Trade Hardback
- 2021 Infiltrator Titan Books, Mass Market Paperback
- 2021 Bone Chase Simon & Schuster, Trade Paperback
- 2022 Aliens vs. Predator: Rift War Yvonne Navarro Titan Books Trade-paperback
- 2022 Red Unicorn Aethon Books, Hardback
- 2022 Red Unicorn Aethon Books, Trade Paperback
- 2023 Alpha Wave (The Sleepers War Series, Book 1) with Jonathan Maberry Blackstone Publishing, Trade Paperback

Collections

- 2000 Scary Rednecks and Other Inbred Horrors Darktales Publications Trade-paperback
- 2002 Appalachian Galapagos Medium Rare Books Hardback
- 2004 Scary Rednecks Omnibus, Delirium Books 26 Deluxe Edition Hardback
- 2011 Multiplex Fandango Dark Regions Press 26 Deluxe Edition Hardback
- 2011 Multiplex Fandango Dark Regions Press Trade Edition Hardback
- 2023 Ziggy Stardust Turpentine Koolaid Wordjitsu LLC, Trade Paperback

Single Book Novellas

- 2001 Natural Selection Darktales Publications Chapbook
- 2007 Vampire Outlaw of the Milky Way Bad Moon Books Chapbook
- 2007 Vampire Outlaw of the Milky Way Bad Moon Books Hardback
- 2008 Redemption Roadshow Burning Effigy Press
- 2009 Lord of the Lash and Our Lady of the Boogaloo Bad Moon Books Chapbook
- 2009 Lord of the Lash and Our Lady of the Boogaloo Bad Moon Books Hardback
- 2010 The Loup Garou Kid Bad Moon Books Chapbook
- 2010 The Loup Garou Kid Bad Moon Books Hardback
- 2010 The Last Kobiashi Maru Crossroads Press e-Book Only
- 2011 Nancy Goats Dark Fuse Hardback
- 2020 Pets During Wartime Thunderstorm Books Hardback

Commercial Properties Worked On

V-Wars
Midian
X-Files
Predator
Hellboy
Joe Ledger
Aliens

Short Fiction and Essays

Weston has more than a hundred and fifty professionally published short stories and essays in various anthologies and magazines such as Cemetery Dance, Weird Tales, Nightmare, and Soldier of Fortune.
