= Survivor (Gonzalez novel) =

2004 novel by J. F. Gonzalez

Survivor is a horror novel by J.F. Gonzalez. The basic premise of the novel was originally published by Delirium Books in 2002 as a novella entitled Maternal Instinct. The book is cited by most critics as operating in the subgenre of “hardcore horror” as Gonzalez’ novel explores in graphic details controversial themes such as bestiality, cannibalism, mutilation, necrophilia, and snuff films.

== Plot summary ==
When Brad and his wife Lisa plan a romantic weekend getaway, Lisa is ecstatic and looks forward to sharing the delightful news with her husband that she is pregnant. However, the prospect of their vacation is dashed almost instantly as they are involved in a curious altercation of road rage and Brad is subsequently arrested for reckless driving by the local county sheriff. Not long after, alone and defenseless Lisa is kidnapped by a band of sadists who plan to torture her as graphically as possible and record the entire gruesome act on film for profit. At the small cabin in the woods where they keep her captive, she meets her co-star for the snuff film: a masochist well-versed in acts of perversion and especially eager to torture Lisa. Desperate to save her life and her unborn child's life, Lisa makes a deal with her captors to offer another innocent person's life in place of her own, abandoning all morals in order to survive.

== Background ==
In an interview with Bookgasm, author J.F. Gonzalez explained how his own incident of road rage inspired the initial concept of his novella, Maternal Instinct, which eventually became Survivor. He also further explains his objectives of such a hardcore and unrelenting piece of fiction by saying, “My original intention wasn't to write something with a polarizing effect, but to simply disturb the hell out of the reader, period. At the time I started writing the short novel Maternal Instinct – which I later expanded into the novel Survivor – I had no idea how the novel was going to progress, or end, for that matter. The characters were telling me this story. I was appalled as anybody by what happened, but I also realized that if I opted out, if I forced certain plot points or motivations to go a certain way to a more safe and 'happy' way, that it would ring false.”

== Critical reception ==
The response to J.F. Gonzalez's Survivor has been mostly positive since its initial release in 2004. When Survivor was contracted and redistributed by Leisure Books in 2006, The New York Times reviewed the novel and praised it saying, “[Survivor] pushes your eyes off the page and then pulls them back, forcing the kind of visceral relationship between writer and reader that the best horror writing can produce.”

== Publishing history ==
Survivor was originally published by Midnight Library, a small publishing house, in 2004. The novel's success soon attracted the attention of Leisure Books and was acquired to be an installment in their Horror division of literature in 2006. J.F. Gonzalez, however, stressed his discontent at Leisure's edition. Survivor was most recently published by Deadite Press in 2011 and is labeled on the gruesome cover of the publication as being, “The Author's Preferred Edition.”
