= W. H. Pugmire =

American horror writer (1951–2019)

Wilum Hopfrog Pugmire
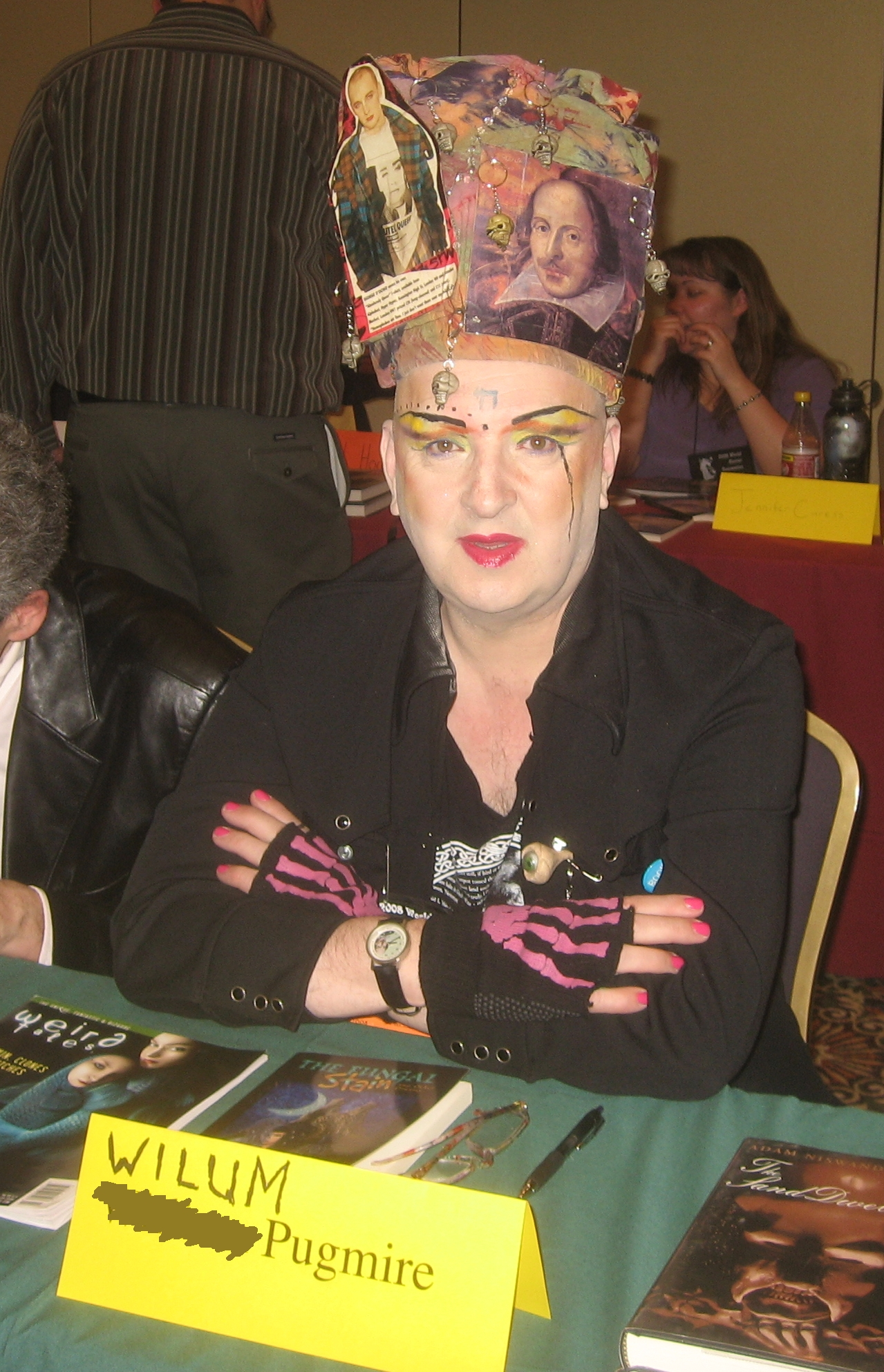
- Pugmire signing books at the World Horror Convention on March 28, 2008
- Born: May 3, 1951 United States
- Died: March 26, 2019 (aged 67) Seattle, Washington
- Occupation: Short story writer
- Genre: Weird fiction, horror fiction
- Literary movement: Cosmicism

Signature
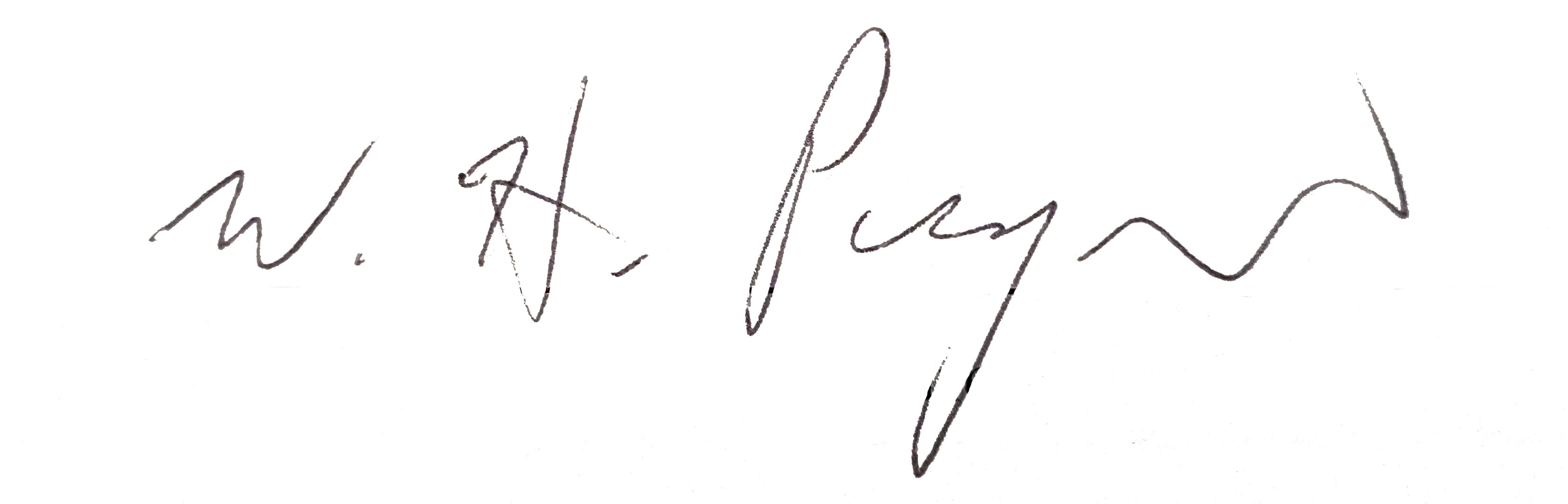

Website
- sesqua.net

Wilum Hopfrog Pugmire (born William Harry Pugmire; May 3, 1951 – March 26, 2019), was a writer of weird fiction and horror fiction based in Seattle, Washington. His works typically were published as W. H. Pugmire (his adopted middle name derives from the story of the same title by Edgar Allan Poe) and his fiction often paid homage to the lore of Lovecraftian horror. Lovecraft scholar and biographer S. T. Joshi described Pugmire as "the prose-poet of the horror/fantasy field; he may be the best prose-poet we have" and as one of the genre's leading Lovecraftian authors.

Pugmire's stories have been published in numerous fanzines, book collections, anthologies and magazines including The Year's Best Horror Stories, The Mammoth Book of Cthulhu, Weird Tales, Year's Best Weird Fiction, and many more. In addition, two major retrospectives of his work, The Tangled Muse and An Ecstasy of Fear, were published in 2010 and 2019.

== Life ==
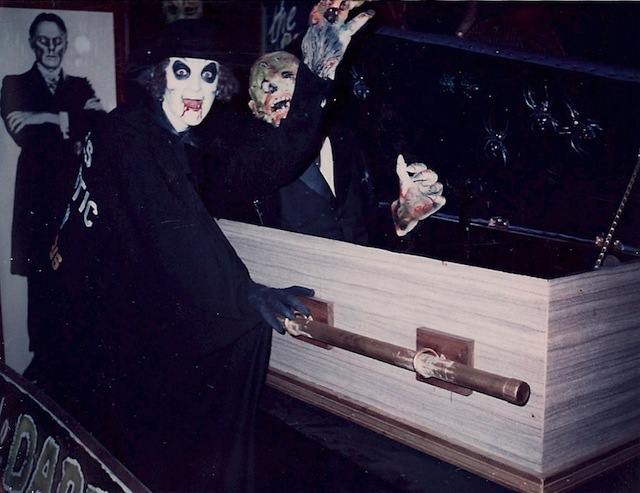
W.H. Pugmire as Count Pugsly

Pugmire was born on May 3, 1951, to a father active in the Church of Jesus Christ of Latter-day Saints (LDS church) and a Jewish mother. Pugmire grew up in Seattle.

Pugmire attended Franklin High School, where he said he was "a wimpy wee fag" who got beaten up a lot. To escape what he called a rough childhood, Pugmire embraced "weird, creepy sci-fi stories" like The Twilight Zone TV show. During this time he also began playing the role of the vampire 'Count Pugsly' at Jones' Fantastic Museum in Seattle. The character was based on the look of Lon Chaney's vampire in London After Midnight and Pugmire played the role into the 1970s. Issue #69 of Forrest J Ackerman's Famous Monsters of Filmland featured a dedication to Pugmire in his 'Count Pugsly' guise. In the documentary film The AckerMonster Chronicles!, Pugmire described how he was influenced by Ackerman's magazine and showed the audience the issue in which his photo appeared.

Following one year in college, he served as a missionary for the LDS church in Omagh, Northern Ireland for eighteen months, where he corresponded with horror writer Robert Bloch and first began writing fiction. It was also in Northern Ireland that Pugmire discovered a paperback of Lovecraft's stories and was immediately captivated.

After returning from his mission in 1973, Pugmire came out as gay to the church, was given psychiatric treatment, and requested excommunication, which lasted for about 25 years. In the early 2000s, he reconnected with the church and was rebaptized, telling the church's leadership that he would be a "totally queer Mormon, but celibate."

For many years Pugmire worked various jobs in cafés owned by old-time punk rockers, who would let him "dress in my Boy George makeup and mini-skirts as I bussed tables and washed dishes." In March 1995, Pugmire's long-time lover, Todd, died in his arms from a heroin overdose. In the early 2000s he became the live-in caregiver for his mother, who was an invalid due to epilepsy and dementia.

Pugmire described himself as an eccentric recluse, "the Queen of Eldritch Horror," and a "punk rock queen and street transvestite".

In 2011, Pugmire nearly died from congestive heart failure. While Pugmire recovered after being hospitalized, these medical issues slowed down his writing. He continued to suffer from heart issues in the following years and, after treatment in a cardiac unit, died in his home in Seattle on March 26, 2019, prompting numerous eulogies and career retrospectives.

== Writing ==
Pugmire first began writing fiction during his Mormon mission in Northern Ireland, but grew discouraged with his work and stopped until the mid-80s. Returning to Seattle, he became a figure in the local punk rock scene and launched an influential zine, Punk Lust, in April 1981. Called "one of the more interesting characters in the history of early 1980s punk," Pugmire filled the zine with his own gothic and grotesque drawings. His zine also published letters, including a number of them written by Mark Arm.

"Punk has shown me that I should be angry," Pugmire later wrote, "and that I can express my anger in the way I look, as well as the way I think."

Pugmire's time in Ireland led him to discover the works of H. P. Lovecraft, and eventually Henry James, Oscar Wilde, and Lovecraft would become his strongest literary influences. Many of Pugmire's stories directly reference "Lovecraftian" elements (especially Nyarlathotep). A self-described "obsessed writer of Lovecraft horror", his stated goal was to "dwell forevermore within Lovecraft's titan shadow", claiming that "being Lovecraftian is my identity as an artist". Pugmire was quoted in the Seattle Post-Intelligencer as saying that his writing was "a form of personal exorcism".

When Pugmire visited Lovecraft's birthplace of Providence, Rhode Island, "he walked the streets from College Hill to Federal Hill with a diary in hand, scratching impressions as he went." Pugmire used these notes in his book Bohemians of Sesqua Valley.

Pugmire set many of his stories in the Sesqua Valley, a fictional location in the Pacific Northwest of the United States which for him served the same purpose as the fictional Arkham / Dunwich / Innsmouth nexus did for Lovecraft, or the Severn Valley for Ramsey Campbell.

== Critical response ==
Pugmire's writings have been described as a "love letter to Lovecraft" around which he constructed his own universe. Pugmire's fiction has also been described as embracing the gothic with a modern sensibility, not as a look or a style but as "an idea that cut against the naive American faith that the past was absolutely past."

Editor and scholar Scott Connors has written that, stylistically, Pugmire "owes as much to Oscar Wilde and Henry James as to HPL and Poe, creating a truly unholy fusion that defies academic boundaries between 'mainstream' and 'genre' fiction." Writing for Weird Fiction Review, Bobby Derie stated that Pugmire "wrote Lovecraftian fiction without the formulaic trappings of the mythos, wrapped in a sensuous prose and characters with easy, fluid sexuality". Issue 28 of The Lovecraft eZine was devoted to Pugmire—"one of our greatest Lovecraftian writers"—with tributes from S. T. Joshi, Joseph S. Pulver Sr., and others; in it, Lovecraftian author and editor Robert M. Price described Pugmire as "the Oscar Wilde of our time ... the most revered and beloved figure in the Lovecraftian movement today." Author Laird Barron listed him as one of "the best contemporary horror/weird fiction" small-press authors, and a writer who "puts forth a new baroque masterpiece every other year". Nick Mamatas, in a 2009 interview, stated that Pugmire and Thomas Ligotti were "the best Lovecraftians today". Lovecraftian writers Mike Davis and Will Hart both called Pugmire "the world's greatest living Lovecraftian writer." Silvia Moreno-Garcia, in a Washington Post review article, spoke of Pugmire's "decadent, lush prose".

S. T. Joshi described Pugmire's writing style as "richly evocative", writing in his scholarly analysis of Cthulhu Mythos fiction, The Rise and Fall of the Cthulhu Mythos, that Pugmire's work contains "some of the richest veins of neo-Lovecraftian horror seen in recent years." However, Joshi has been more critical of Pugmire's nonfiction writing, proclaiming "no one takes him seriously as a critic."

Asimov's Science Fiction magazine, in their review of Sesqua Valley and Other Haunts, stated that "Pugmire's devotion to his sources transcends mere pastiche, and his style is neither overwrought nor too sparse." Publishers Weekly, reviewing Uncommon Places: A Collection of Exquisites, said that readers "with an appetite for the weird and the decadent will find Pugmire's work a rich confection." The site's review of Monstrous Aftermath: Stories in the Lovecraft Tradition, stated that "horror fans fond of baroque prose" should enjoy the collection, noting "a knack for injecting gallows humor", but adding that those "looking for memorable plots and vivid characterizations ... will have to look elsewhere." Fantasy Magazine's review of The Weird Inhabitants of Sesqua Valley, while observing "the love-it-or-hate-it nature of even the best Lovecraftian style", noted that there were "many pleasures to be had" in the collection of "surprisingly humanistic" tales. The New York Review of Science Fiction's review of The Tangled Muse stated that Pugmire's writing revealed "a mastery of language and vocabulary that brings to mind the work of Clark Ashton Smith", noting a "distinct homoerotic theme or undercurrent that is neither gratuitous nor inconsistent but rather genuine and often central to characterization and storytelling."

== Bibliography ==
Originally published mainly in fanzines and small press magazines, Pugmire produced a steady stream of book collections beginning in 1997. Centipede Press published two major retrospectives of his work: The Tangled Muse in October 2010, and An Ecstasy of Fear in June 2019. Earlier stories were often rewritten substantially by Pugmire if republished (notably in Weird Inhabitants of Sesqua Valley and The Tangled Muse).

=== Short fiction and poetry collections ===
- Tales of Sesqua Valley (1997, Necropolitan Press)
- Dreams of Lovecraftian Horror (1999, Mythos Books, ISBN 978-0-9659433-4-5)
- Songs of Sesqua Valley (2000, Imelod Publications; collection of sonnets). Note: Although this volume was announced, and the poems appeared in Imelod magazine, the standalone volume did not appear. Pugmire dropped some poems and added new ones when he printed the poetic sequence in Sesqua Valley and Other Haunts (2008).
- Tales of Love and Death (2001, Delirium Books, ISBN 978-1-929653-15-7)
- A Clicking in the Shadows and Other Tales (2002, Undaunted Press; with Chad Hensley)
- Sesqua Valley and Other Haunts (2003, Delirium Books; 2008 Mythos Books paperback reprint contains three new stories). The volume also contains "Songs from Sesqua Valley", a sequence of 33 sonnets by Pugmire, most of which had previously appeared in a Canadian small press magazine, Imelod.
- The Fungal Stain and Other Dreams (2006, Hippocampus Press, ISBN 978-0-9771734-3-3)
- Weird Inhabitants of Sesqua Valley (2009, Terradan Works, ISBN 978-1-4486-9954-4)
- The Tangled Muse (2010, Centipede Press, ISBN 978-1-933618-78-4)
- Gathered Dust and Others (2011, Dark Regions Press, ISBN 978-1937128098)
- Some Unknown Gulf of Night (2011, Arcane Wisdom Press, ISBN 978-1935006114)
- The Strange Dark One: Tales of Nyarlathotep (2012, Miskatonic River Press, ISBN 978-0-9821818-9-8)
- Uncommon Places: A Collection of Exquisites (2012, Hippocampus Press, ISBN 978-1-61498-023-0; prose-poetry collection)
- Encounters with Enoch Coffin (2013, Dark Regions Press, ISBN 978-1-62641-000-8; with Jeffrey Thomas)
- Bohemians of Sesqua Valley (2013, Arcane Wisdom Press)
- The Revenant of Rebecca Pascal (2014, Dark Renaissance Books, ISBN 978-1-937128-83-8; novel; with David Barker)
- These Black Winged Ones (2014, Myth Ink Books)
- In the Gulfs of Dreams and Other Lovecraftian Tales (2015, Dark Renaissance Books, ISBN 978-1-937128-49-4; with David Barker)
- Monstrous Aftermath: Stories in the Lovecraftian Tradition (2015, Hippocampus Press, ISBN 978-1-61498-133-6)
- An Ecstasy of Fear (2019, Centipede Press, ISBN 978-1-61347-085-5)
- An Imp of Aether (2019, Hippocampus Press, ISBN 978-1-61498-276-0)

=== Novel ===
- Witches in Dreamland (2018, Hippocampus Press, ISBN 978-1-614982-30-2; with David Barker)

=== Selected anthology and magazine appearances ===
- "Whispering Wires", Space and Time (#20, September 1973; as "Bill Pugmire"; first sold story)
- "Pale Trembling Youth" (with Jessica Amanda Salmonson), Cutting Edge (1986, Doubleday); reprinted in The Year's Best Horror Stories XV (1987, DAW Books) and Horrrorstory Vol. V (1989, Underwood-Miller)
- "O, Christmas Tree" (with Jessica Amanda Salmonson), Tales by Moonlight II (1989, Tor Books)
- "The Boy with the Bloodstained Mouth", The Year's Best Horror Stories XVIII (1990, DAW Books)
- "Delicious Antique Whore", Love in Vein (1994, HarperCollins; 2000, Eos; 2005, Harper Voyager)
- "The Night City" (with Chad Hensley), The Darker Side: Generations of Horror (2002, Roc Books)
- "The Serenade of Starlight", The Children of Cthulhu (2002, Del Rey Books / Ballantine Books)
- "The House of Idiot Children" (with M. K. Snyder), Weird Tales (#348, January / February 2008)
- "Inhabitants of Wraithwood", Black Wings: New Tales of Lovecraftian Horror (2010, PS Publishing; reprinted as Black Wings of Cthulhu, 2012, Titan Books)
- "Some Buried Memory", The Book of Cthulhu (2011, Night Shade Books)
- "The Fungal Stain", New Cthulhu: The Recent Weird (2011, Prime Books)
- "The Hands that Reek and Smoke", The Book of Cthulhu II (2012, Night Shade Books)
- "A Quest of Dream", Year's Best Weird Fiction, Volume One (2014, Undertow Publications)
- "Half Lost in Shadow", Black Wings IV (2015, PS Publishing; 2016, Titan Books)
- "Old Time Entombed", That Is Not Dead: Tales of the Cthulhu Mythos Through the Centuries (2015, PS Publishing)
- "They Smell of Thunder", New Cthulhu 2: More Recent Weird (2015, Prime Books)
- "Into Ye Smoke-Wreath'd World of Dream", Cthulhu Fhtagn! (2015, Word Horde)
- "The Imps of Innsmouth", Innsmouth Nightmares (2015, PS Publishing)
- "A Shadow of Thine Own Design", The Mammoth Book of Cthulhu (2016, Robinson / Running Press)
- "A Gentleman of Darkness", Heroes of Red Hook (2016, Golden Goblin Press, reprinted 2021 in His Own Most Fantastic Creation: Stories about H. P. Lovecraft, Hippocampus Press)
- "In Blackness Etched, My Name", Black Wings V (2016, PS Publishing; 2018, Titan Books)
- "The Barrier Between", Nightmare's Realm: New Tales of the Weird and Fantastic (2017, Dark Regions Press)
- "To Move Beneath Autumnal Oaks", Black Wings VI (2017, PS Publishing; 2018, Titan Books)
- "An Implement of Ice", Weirdbook (#38, 2018)
