= John Everson =

American novelist (born 1966)

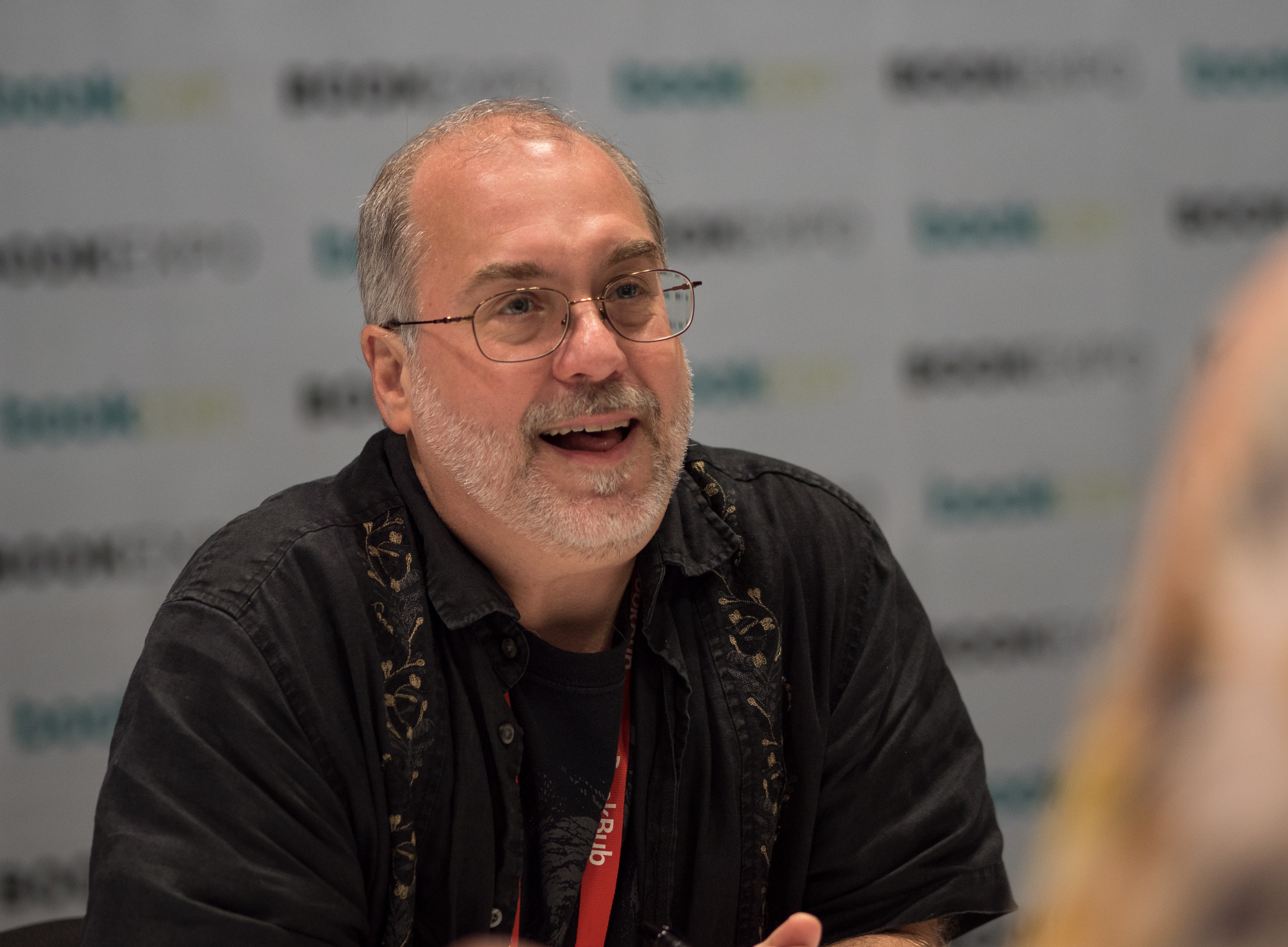
- Everson at BookExpo America in 2018
- Born: March 14, 1966 (age 60)
- Education: University of Illinois Urbana-Champaign
- Occupations: Novelist; short story writer; editor; publisher
- Writing career
- Genres: Horror, fantasy, dark fantasy, gothic, science fiction
- Notable awards: Bram Stoker Award for Covenant (2004); Bram Stoker Nominee for "Letting Go" (2007); Bram Stoker Nominee for NightWhere (2012);
- Website: johneverson.com

John Everson (born March 14, 1966) is an American author of contemporary horror, dark fantasy, science fiction and fantasy fiction. He is the author of fifteen novels and four short fiction collections, as well as three mini-collections, all focusing on horror and the supernatural. His novel Covenant, was originally released in a limited edition hardcover by Delirium Books in 2004 and won the Bram Stoker Award for a First Novel the following year from the Horror Writers Association. His sixth novel, NightWhere, was a finalist for the Bram Stoker Award in 2012.

== Biography ==
Everson was born in 1966 and spent most of his childhood in Tinley Park, Illinois. He graduated from the University of Illinois at Urbana-Champaign with a degree in journalism in 1988 and worked for two years at The Star Newspapers in Chicago Heights, IL, where he began the weekly music review column "Pop Stops." He wrote this column for the newspaper for nearly 20 years, even after leaving The Star as a full-time reporter to serve as an editor for the Illinois Entertainer magazine for four years. His first two novels feature a reporter, Joe Kieran, as the lead character, drawing on his experience in journalism.

In 2000, his first collection of short fiction, Cage of Bones & Other Deadly Obsessions, appeared from Delirium Books, which also released his first novel, Covenant, in 2004. Covenant was reissued by mass market paperback publisher Leisure Books in 2008, which also reissued the sequel Sacrifice in 2009 as well as his next two novels, The 13th and Siren. His fifth novel, The Pumpkin Man was released by Leisure's parent company, Dorchester Publishing.

After more than 1,000 Dorchester Publishing titles were acquired by Amazon Publishing in 2012, Everson's first five novels were re-issued by Amazon's 47North imprint. That same year, his sixth novel, NightWhere, was issued by Samhain Publishing, which also released his subsequent novels Violet Eyes and The Family Tree.

In 2013, Everson was commissioned by Amazon Publishing to help launch its new Kindle Worlds portal, which aimed to monetize fan fiction by licensing popular fictional worlds and opening them for writers to work in. Everson wrote a novelette in the Vampire Diaries world entitled "Witch Trapped.".

Everson also contributed two stories to the V-Wars book series created and edited by Jonathan Maberry and published by IDW Publishing. His stories "Love Less" (from V-Wars, 2012) and "Love Lost" (from V-Wars: Night Terrors, 2015) created the characters of vampire sisters Danika and Mila Dubov, who appear in the first season of the Netflix series V-Wars, which debuted on Dec. 5, 2019.

In addition to writing, Everson is the publisher of Dark Arts Books, which has released a dozen anthologies and single author collections since 2006. In 2008, the Dark Arts Books anthology Like A Chinese Tattoo was a finalist for the Bram Stoker Award in the Anthology category.

Everson lives with his wife Geri and son Shaun in Naperville, Illinois.

== Awards and nominations ==
- Covenant: 2004 Bram Stoker Award for First Novel Winner
- "Letting Go": 2007 Bram Stoker Award for Short Fiction Finalist
- NightWhere: 2012 Bram Stoker Award for Best Novel Finalist
- Le Pacte Des Suicides: 2017 Masterton Award for Translated Novel

== Bibliography ==
=== Novels ===
- Covenant (Delirium Books, 2004; Leisure Books, 2008)
- Sacrifice (Delirium Books, 2007; Leisure Books, 2009)
- The 13th (Necro Publications, 2009; Leisure Books, 2009)
- Siren (Bad Moon Books, 2010; Leisure Books, 2010)
- The Pumpkin Man (Delirium Books, 2011; Dorchester Publications, 2011)
- NightWhere (Samhain Publishing, 2012; Dark Arts Books, 2017)
- Violet Eyes (Samhain Publishing, 2013; Sinister Grin Press, 2016; Dark Arts Books, 2017)
- The Family Tree (Samhain Publishing, 2014; Sinister Grin Press, 2017; Dark Arts Books, 2017)
- Redemption (Dark Arts Books, 2017)
- The House By The Cemetery (Flame Tree Press, 2018)
- The Devil's Equinox (Flame Tree Press, 2019)
- Voodoo Heart (Flame Tree Press, 2020)
- Five Deaths for Seven Songbirds (Flame Tree Press, 2022)
- The Night Mother (Dark Arts Books, 2023)
- The Bloodstained Doll (Flame Tree Press, 2024)

=== Short story collections ===
- Cage of Bones & Other Deadly Obsessions (2000, Delirium Books)
- Vigilantes of Love (2003, Twilight Tales Books)
- Needles & Sins (2007, Necro Publications)
- Sacrificing Virgins (2015, Samhain Publishing; Dark Arts Books, 2017)

=== Mini Short Story Collections ===
- Candy In the Dumpster (2006, Dark Arts Books)
- Creeptych (2010, Delirium Books)
- Deadly Nightlusts: A Collection of Forbidden Magic (2010, Blasphemous Books)
- Christmas Tales (2010, E3)

=== Novelettes & Novellas ===
- Failure (2006)
- Violet Lagoon (2010)
- THE VAMPIRE DIARIES: Witch Trapped (2013)
- NIGHTWHERE: Field of Flesh (2017)
- Living Death Race (2024)

=== Anthology Appearances ===
- SPGA Showcase - "Warmin' The Women" (June 1996)
- Distant Journeys - "Biological Imperative" (Fall 1996)
- Nasty Snips - "Mirror Image" (Fall 1999)
- TransVersions - "Calling of the Moon" (Fall 2000)
- The Dead Inn - "Sacrificing Virgins" (February 2001)
- Bloodtype CD Anthology - "Mutilation Street" (Spring 2001)
- Dark Testament - "Mary" (February 2002)
- Freaks, Geeks & Sideshow Floozies - "Love & Sex & Rope & Screams: A Circus in 3 Acts" (Spring 2002)
- Tourniquet Heart - "Anniversary" (Summer 2002)
- Decadence 2 - "Dead Girl on the Side of the Road" (Summer 2002)
- MOTA 3: Courage - "Spirits Having Flown" (Summer 2003)
- Damned: An Anthology of the Lost - "Green Green Glass" (Spring 2004)
- Peepshow Vol. 1 - "Star on the Beach" (Spring 2004)
- Small Bites - "Faux" (Fall 2004)
- Spooks! - "The Tapping" (October 2004)
- Cold Flesh - "Camille Smiled" (Summer 2005)
- In Delirium - "The House That Shane Built" (January 2006)
- Dark Doorways - "My Aim Is True (Spring 2006)
- Fear - "Long Distance Call" (September 2006)
- On Writing Horror - chapter on "Small Press" (November 2006)
- Kolchak: The Night Stalker - "The Strange Events at Vishnu Springs" - February 2007
- Echoes of Terror - "Ice Cold Shakes" (Spring 2007)
- A Dark and Deadly Valley - "The Devil's Platoon" (Spring 2007)
- Darker Discoveries - "The Eyes Have It" (Spring 2008)
- Horror Library, Vol. 3 - "Fish Bait" (2008)
- Infernally Yours - "And Then Shall The Reign of Lucifer End" (2009)
- The Death Panel - "The Mouth" (2009)
- Terrible Beauty, Fearful Symmetry - "In Memoryum" (2009)
- Best New Zombie Tales Vol. 2 - "Camille Smiled" (2010)
- Fell Beasts - "Yellow" (2011)
- Gothic Blue Book - "The Tapping" (2011)
- Best New Vampire Tales Vol. 1 - "When Barrettes Brought Justice to a Burning Heart" (2011)
- The Green Hornet Casefiles - "The Black Widow" (2011)
- The Necro Files: Two Decades of Extreme Horror - "Every Last Drop" (2011)
- V-Wars - "Love Less" (2011)
- Relics and Remains - "Nailed" (2012)
- All-American Horror of the 21st Century: The First Decade 2000-2010 - "The Pumpkin Man" (2013)
- The Carnival 13 - "Prologue/Chapter One" (Round Robin Novella, 2013)
- Equilibrium Overturned: The Heart of Darkness Awaits - "Amnion" (2014)
- Qualia Nous - "Voyeur" (2014)
- Suspended in Dusk - "Spirits Having Flown" (2014)
- Eulogies III - "The Hole To China" (2015)
- V-Wars: Night Terrors - "Love Lost" (2015)
- Dread - "Amnion" (2016)
- Drive-In Creature Feature - "Ghoul Friend In A Coma" (2016)
- Cemetery Riots - "Driving Her Home" (2016)
- Into Painfreak - "Sing Blue Silver" (2016)
- Fearful Fathoms: Collected Tales of Aquatic Terror Vol. 1 - "Seastruck" (2017)
- Chopping Block Party - "The Most Dangerous Game" (2017)
- Midnight in the Graveyard - "The Cemetery Man" (2019)
- Survive With Me - "Forest Butter" (2020)
- Beyond the Veil - "Arnie's Ashes" (2021)
- Kolchak Nosferatu - "All Roads Lead Back to the Bite" (2023)
