= Gene O'Neill =

American novelist

- Born: 1938 (age 87–88)
- Education: California State University, Sacramento; University of Minnesota
- Occupation: Writer
- Spouse: Kay
- Writing career
- Period: 1980–present
- Genres: Horror fiction, Fantasy, Science fiction

Gene O'Neill (born 1938) is an American writer of science fiction, fantasy, and horror fiction.

O'Neill's professional writing career began after completing the Clarion West Writers Workshop in 1979. Since that time, over 100 of his works have been published. His short story work has appeared in Cemetery Dance Magazine, Twilight Zone Magazine, and The Magazine of Fantasy & Science Fiction.

O'Neill has had many occupations besides writing including postal worker, contract specialist for AAFES, college basketball player, amateur boxer, United States Marine, right-of-way agent, and vice president of a small manufacturing plant. He also holds two degrees from California State University, Sacramento and University of Minnesota.

== Awards and honors ==
Besides having his stories reprinted worldwide, including Russia, Spain, and France, he has received many other honors including:

- The Taste of Tenderloin received a 2009 starred review in Publishers Weekly
- The Confessions of St. Zach received a "Best Small Press Chill" Black Quill Award nomination from Dark Scribe in 2009

=== Bram Stoker Awards ===
- "Balance", received a Bram Stoker Award nomination for Best Short Fiction in 2007
- The Confessions of St. Zach received a Bram Stoker Award nomination for Best Long Fiction in 2009
- Taste of Tenderloin won the Bram Stoker Award for Best Fiction Collection in 2010

== Select bibliography ==
=== Novels and novellas ===
- The Grand Struggle (Prime Books, 2004)
- Collected Tales of the Baja Express (Delirium Books, 2006)
- White Tribe (Elder Signs Press, 2007)
- The Confessions of St. Zach (Bad Moon Books, 2008)
- Lost Tribe (Bad Moon Books, 2009)
- Not Fade Away (forthcoming, 2010)

==== Sacramento detective series ====
- Shadow of the Dark Angel (Dominion, 2002 / Bad Moon Books, 2009) ISBN 1-894815-25-4
- Deathflash (Bad Moon Books, 2009)
- Double Jack (Bad Moon Books, 2011)

==== Cal Wild series ====
- The Burden of Indigo (Prime Books, 2002)
- The Armless Conductor (The Magazine of Fantasy and Science Fiction) (September, 1987)
- The Confessions of St. Zach (Bad Moon Books, 2008)
- Doc Good's Travelling Show (Bad Moon Books, 2009)
- The Great Northern Sweetwater Raid novella featured in the collection called Sideshow Exhibits (Sideshow Press, 2010)
- Jade (Bad Moon Books, 2010)

=== Short stories ===
Stories from anthologies and magazines:

- "The Burden of Indigo" Twilight Zone Magazine (October, 1981)
- "The Affective Connection" Pulpsmith (1982)
- "Dakota Safari" Twilight Zone Magazine (April, 1983)
- "Alchemy" The Magazine of Fantasy and Science Fiction (May, 1983)
- "It's in Their Eyes" from the anthology Damnations edited by R. K. Leming (Miskatonic University Press, 1984)
- "300 S. Montgomery" The Magazine of Fantasy and Science Fiction (July, 1984)
- "The Shadow of the Mountain" The Magazine of Fantasy and Science Fiction (March, 1985)
- "The White Quetzal" The Magazine of Fantasy and Science Fiction (July 1985)
- "The Armless Conductor" The Magazine of Fantasy and Science Fiction (September, 1987)
- "Live Oak" from the anthology Men and Women of Letters, edited by John Yewell (1988)
- "With Grace" Tales of the Unanticipated (Spring/Summer/Fall, 1990)
- "Awaken Dragon" The Magazine of Fantasy and Science Fiction(May, 1990)
- "The Beautiful Stranger" Starshore (Spring, 1991)
- "The City Never Sleeps" from the anthology Dead End: City Limits edited by David B. Silva and Paul F. Olson (St. Martin's Press, 1991)
- "New Kicks" Cemetery Dance Magazine #13 / Volume 4, #3 (Summer, 1992)
- "Undercover" Science Fiction Age (November, 1992)
- "In the Big Window" Eldritch Tales #29 (Fall, 1993)
- "Down on the 01 Level" Science Fiction Age (May, 1994)
- "The Ishikawa Proliferation" Tomorrow Speculative Fiction (October, 1995)
- "Groundling Dancer" Science Fiction Age (July, 1997)
- "The Hitchhiking Effect" Science Fiction Age (May, 1998)
- "Flange Turner" from the anthology Hideous Dreams edited by L. H. Maynard, M. P. N. Sims (Cosmos Books/Wildside Press, 2001)
- "The Apotheosis of Nathan McKee" from the anthology Unnatural Selection edited by Gord Rollo (Cosmos Books, 2001)
- "Dead Cat Meets Frankenpup" from the anthology Dead Cats Bouncing edited by Gerard Houarner & GAK (Necro Publications/Bedlam Press, 2002)
- "The Faceless Man" Redsine #8 (April, 2002)
- "You Do the Math" Redsine #10 (October, 2002)
- "When Legends Die" from the anthology Decadence edited by Monica J. O'Rourke (Prime Books, 2002)
- "Jackie" from the anthology Darkness Rising Volume 5: Black Shroud of Fear edited by M. P. N. Sims and L. H. Maynard (Prime Books, 2002)
- "Magic Numbers" from the anthology Borderlands 5 edited by Elizabeth E. Monteleone and Thomas F. Monteleone (Borderlands Press, 2003)
- "Masquerade" from the anthology Bare Bone #6 edited by Kevin L. Donihe (Raw Dog Screaming Press, 2004)
- "White Tribe" from the anthology New Dark Voices edited by Shane Ryan Staley (Delirium Books, 2004)
- "Dance of the Blue Lady" Cemetery Dance Magazine #53 (2005)
- "Balance" Cemetery Dance Magazine #55 (2006)

=== Collections ===
- Rockers, Shamans, Manikins & Thanathespians (Silver Lake Publications, 2001) ISBN 1-931095-23-X
- Ghost, Spirits, Computers and World Machines (Prime Books, 2001) ISBN 1-894815-04-1
- The Grand Struggle
- The Taste of Tenderloin (Apex Publishing, 2009) ISBN 978-0-9816390-0-0
