= Harry Shannon (songwriter) =

American novelist and songwriter

- Born: Harry Rivard Siebert; December 4, 1948 (age 77); Reno, Nevada, U.S.
- Education: Newport University
- Occupations: Novelist; songwriter; entertainer
- Spouse: Wendy Kramer
- Children: Paige Emerson Shannon
- Writing career
- Genres: Mystery, horror
- Notable awards: Nominated for Prime Time Emmy; Nominated for Bram Stoker Award for short story "Night Nurse"; Best Dark Scribble from Dark Scribe Magazine for "Night Nurse"; Tombstone Award for Best Small Press Novel "Night of the Werewolf"; ASCAP Country Music Awards in 1976 "Cowboy" (Eddy Arnold) and 1978 for "So Good, So Rare, So Fine" (Freddy Hart)
- Website: www.harryshannon.com

Harry Shannon (born December 4, 1948) is an American novelist, songwriter and entertainer. He was born Harry Rivard Siebert in Reno, Nevada, to Dr. William L. Siebert and Belle Elizabeth (née) Cazier. He has a brother, Dwight W. Siebert, and a sister, Marsha Desiderio.

Raised in Reno, Shannon moved to Pomona, California in the late 1950s, where he attended Ganesha High School. After graduation, he joined the singing group The Kids Next Door, touring colleges around the US, playing casino and show rooms and performing on variety television shows. He was also a member of The Back Porch Majority and did commercials for Ford Motor Company with The Going Thing.

Shannon signed with ATV Music Group in 1975 and eventually became executive director of the company. He co-wrote a number of songs recorded by artists such as Eddy Arnold ("Cowboy"), Reba McEntire ("Small Two Bedroom Starter"), Engelbert Humperdinck ("Love You Back To Sleep"), and Glen Campbell ("Why Don't We Just Sleep On It Tonight"). During this period he collaborated extensively with Emmy winner Billy Goldenberg, and was nominated for an Emmy Award for his lyrics to the 1982 song "Just a Little More Love" from the CBS TV film The Gift of Life. Shannon and Klee recorded six duet albums and performed at a number of concerts and on television shows in Switzerland from 1979 through 1995.

Mr. Shannon was also Vice President, Music for Carolco Pictures, Inc. from 1988 to 1992, working on motion pictures such as Terminator 2: Judgment Day, Rambo III, Red Heat, Mountains of the Moon and several television films. After leaving Carolco, he was Music Supervisor on the hit films Basic Instinct and Universal Soldier. He left the entertainment business and has an MA in psychology from Newport University.

Shannon is now a counselor in private practice in Studio City, California. Many of his clients are entertainment professionals. He began writing fiction in 2001. His short stories have been published in Cemetery Dance and a number of other magazines.

== Personal life ==
Shannon was married from 1978 to 1988 to Swiss singer Suzanne Klee. In 1994 he married songwriter Wendy Kramer. They have one child, Paige Emerson Shannon, born 1999.

== Selected bibliography ==
=== Novels ===
Mick Callahan series

- Memorial Day (Five Star Mystery 2003)
- Eye of the Burning Man (Five Star Mystery 2004)
- One of the Wicked (Five Star Mystery 2008)

Stand-Alone novels

- Night of the Beast (Medium Rare Books 2001)
- Night of the Werewolf (Medium Rare Books 2002)
- The Pressure of Darkness (Five Star Mystery 2005)
- Night of the Daemon (Delirium Books 2005, Limited Edition Hardcover)
- Daemon (Delirium Books 2006)
- Dead and Gone (Delirium Books 2007)

=== Novellas ===
"Behold the Child" from Brimstone Turnpike (Cemetery Dance Publications 2005)
"PAIN" Dark Regions Press 2010

=== Anthologies ===
Dark Delicacies 2, Fear Hardcover and mass-market
Tales from the Gorezone (OOP)
The Fear Within (OOP)
Small Bites Coscom Press'In Delirium 2, Delirium Books
Bare Bones (OOP)
A Dark and Deadly Valley Silverthought Press
On Deadly Ground Cemetery Dance
Eulogies Horror World Press OOP

=== Collections ===
Bad Seed Medium Rare Books 2001 OOP
Bad Seed 2 Medium Rare Books 2002 OOP
A Host of Shadows Dark Regions Press, 2010

=== Screenplays ===
Dead and Gone, Directed by Yossi Sasson, Lions Gate Entertainment 2008
PAIN (optioned but unproduced)
Daemon a.k.a. Ghoul (unproduced)
The Pressure of Darkness (unfinished)
Night of the Werewolf (optioned but unproduced)
Darkside (optioned but unproduced)

=== Short fiction ===
Cemetery Dance, City Slab, Gothic.net. Kinships, Bare Bones, Horror World, Horror Drive-In, Horror Garage, Crimespree, Black October.

=== Non-fiction ===
Crimespree, Mystery Scene, Really Scary
