= Joseph W. Walker =

American kareteka (1952–2023)

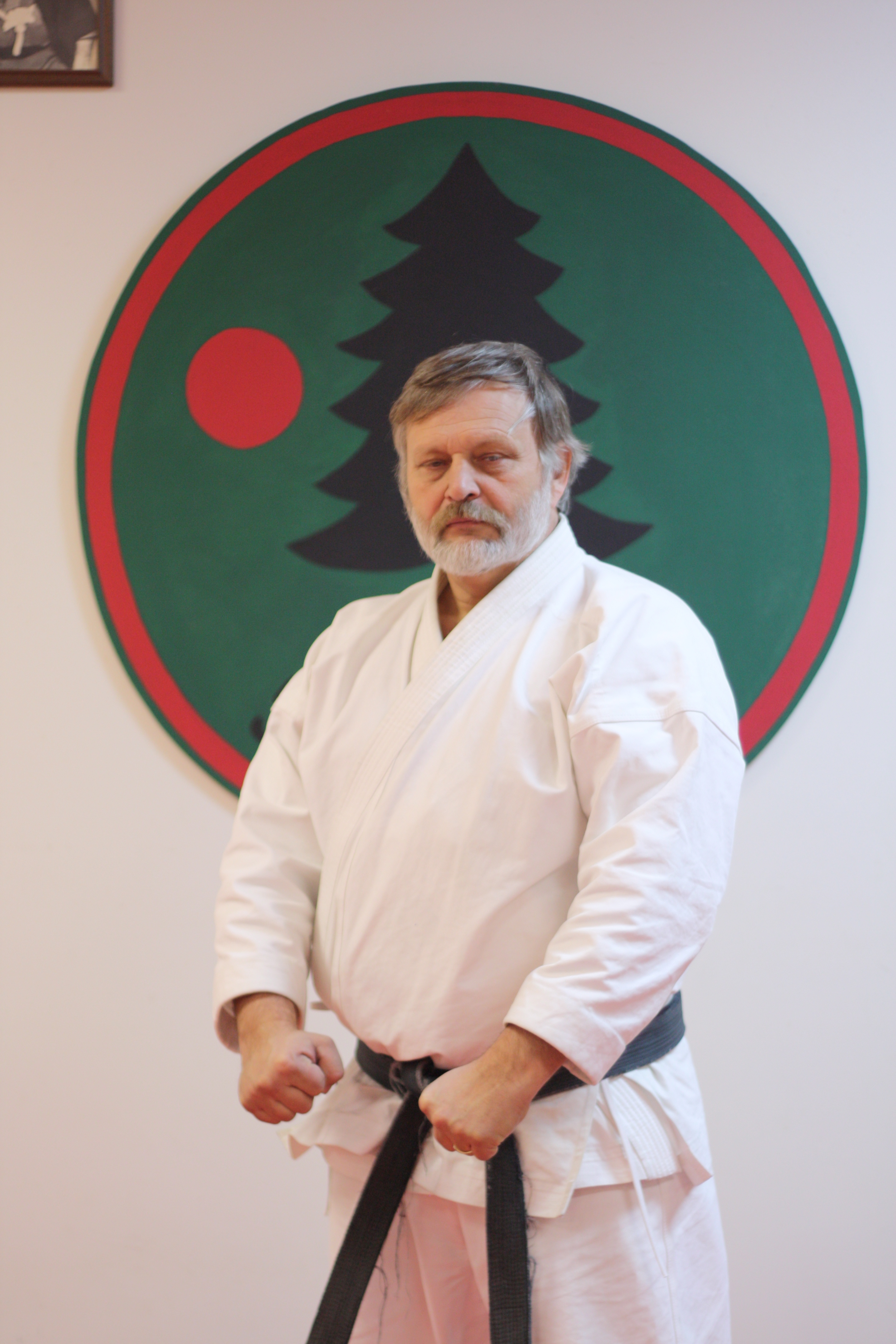
Shihan Joseph W. Walker

Joseph W. Walker (October 21, 1952 – March 20, 2023) was a Chief Instructor of Shuri-ryū karate, the 1970 Midwest Karate Champion, and a five-time United States Karate Alliance World Champion (1990 and 1991) in the Koshiki, or sparring in armor, division. Walker also took 2nd place in the USKA Masters Black Belt Kata division in 1991. Shihan Walker retired from competition for fifteen years before returning to win the Master's division in Kata in 2007, 2008 and 2009.

Shihan Walker trained in karate under Shuri-ryu founder Grand Master Robert A Trias starting in 1969 and was the first black belt promoted under Trias's new Shuri-ryu standards in 1973. He was a 9th Dan (9th degree black belt) under Hanshi Robert Bowles and served on the International Shuri-ryu Association Council alongside Milt Calander (7th Dan), John Linebarger (7th Dan), Tony Bisanz (7th Dan), and Sandra Bowles (9th Dan).

Walker opened the Academy of Okinawan Karate in Peoria in 1979. In 1997, the Academy was named one of the top 200 martial arts schools in North America. The Academy continues to operate with four dojos in Peoria, Morton, and Eureka, Illinois and Burleson, Texas

Shihan Walker started his martial arts training in Judo in 1960, and started studying karate under students of Trias in 1968. He made his first trip to Phoenix, AZ to study under Trias directly in 1969. Trias awarded Walker a black belt in Judo in 1987, and Walker earned a 2nd degree black belt in Judo in 1993. Walker toured Okinawa with the USKA in 1982, and returned to Okinawa to compete in the World Team Competition with the International Shuri-ryu Association in 1994. The US took 5th place that year.

Shihan Walker also trained in Haganah with Mike Kanerick. Walker was certified in F.I.G.H.T, Israeli Tactical Knife fighting and Ground Survival.
