= Gerard Daniel Houarner =

American writer

Gerard Daniel Houarner (born 1955) is an American writer of horror, dark fantasy and science fiction short stories and novels. He has had over 300 stories published since 1973. He has been the fiction editor of Space and Time magazine since 1998.

== Novels and short fiction collections ==
- The Bard of Sorcery (1986)
- Painfreak (1996)
- Inside the Works (1997) (with Edward Lee and Tom Piccirilli)
- I Love You and There Is Nothing You Can Do About It (1998)
- Road to Hell (1999)
- Black Orchids from Aum (2000)
- The Beast That Was Max (2001)
- Visions Through a Shattered Lens (2002)
- The Oz Suite (2008)
- Road From Hell (2007)
- A Blood of Killers (2009)
- Waiting for Mister Cool (2013)
- Dark City: A Novella Collection (2016) (with Brian Hodge)
- The Sting of Wonder, the Seed of Faith (2016)
- In the Country of Dreaming Caravans (2017)
- Dark Wonderland (2018)
- Painfreak: Ultimate Edition (2022)

== Anthologies ==
- Going Postal (1998)
- Dead Cats Bouncing, with GAK (2002)
- Dead Cat's Traveling Circus of Wonders and Miracle Medicine Show, with GAK (2006)
- Into Painfreak (2016)

== See also ==
- List of horror fiction authors
