= Thomas Piccirilli =

American novelist

Tom Piccirilli
- Born: May 27, 1965
- Died: July 11, 2015 (aged 50)
- Occupation: Writer
- Writing career
- Period: 1990–2015
- Genres: Poetry, Horror fiction, Fantasy, Crime fiction, Noir fiction, Hardboiled

Thomas Piccirilli (May 27, 1965 – July 11, 2015) was an American novelist, short story writer, editor, and poet, known for his writing in the crime, mystery, and horror genres.

== Career ==
Piccirilli sold over 150 stories in the mystery, thriller, horror, erotica, and science fiction fields. Some of his stories were included in the zombie anthologies which James Lowder edited for Eden Studios. he died of brain cancer on July 11, 2015, at age 50.

== Awards ==
Piccirilli was a two-time winner of the International Thriller Writers Award for "Best Paperback Original" (2008, 2010). He is a four-time winner of the Bram Stoker Award. He was also a finalist for the 2009 Edgar Allan Poe Award given by the Mystery Writers of America, a final nominee for the Fantasy Award, and the winner of the first Bram Stoker Award given in the category of "Best Poetry Collection".

== Bibliography ==
=== Novels ===
- Dark Father (Pocket, 1990) ISBN 0-671-67401-3
- Shards (Write Way, 1996) ISBN 1-885173-23-7
- Inside the Works: A 3-Way Collection of Hardcore Horror (Necro Publications, 1997) (with Gerard Daniel Houarner, Edward Lee) ISBN 1-889186-07-4
- Hexes (Leisure, 1999) ISBN 0-8439-4483-8
- The Deceased (Leisure, 2000) ISBN 0-8439-4752-7
- The Night Class (2000)
- A Lower Deep (2001)
- Grave Men (2002)
- Fuckin' Lie Down Already (2003)
- A Choir of Ill Children (2003)
- Coffin Blues (2004)
- Thrust (2005)
- November Mourns (2005)
- Headstone City (2006)
- The Dead Letters (2006)
- Frayed (2007)
- The Midnight Road (Bantam, 2007) ISBN 0-553-38408-2
- The Fever Kill (2007)
- The Cold Spot (Bantam, 2008) ISBN 0-553-59084-7
- The Coldest Mile (Bantam, 2009)ISBN 0-553-59085-5
- Shadow Season (Bantam, 2009) ISBN 0-553-59247-5

==== Series ====
===== Felicity Grove series =====
1. The Dead Past (Write Way, 1997)
2. Sorrow's Crown (Write Way, 1998) ISBN 1-885173-53-9

===== Cold series =====
1. The Cold Spot (Bantam, 2008) ISBN 0-553-59084-7
2. The Coldest Mile (Bantam, 2009) ISBN 0-553-59085-5
3. The Cold and the Dead (tentative title, not completed)

===== Terrier Rand series =====
1. The Last Kind Words (Bantam, 2012) ISBN 978-0-553-59248-1
2. The Last Whisper in the Dark (Bantam, 2013) ISBN 978-0-345-52900-8

==== Media tie-ins ====
- Hellboy: Emerald Hell (Dark Horse, 2008) ISBN 1-59582-141-4

=== Novellas ===
- Cast in Dark Waters (Cemetery Dance Publications, 2002) (with Ed Gorman) ISBN 1-58767-013-5
- All You Despise (Shroud Publishing, 2008)
- The Nobody (Tasmaniac Publications, 2008) ISBN 978-0-9803868-7-5
- Every Shallow Cut (ChiZine Publications, 2011) ISBN 978-1-926851-10-5
- The Walls of the Castle (Dark Regions Press, 2013)
- What Makes you Die (Apex Publications, 2013) ISBN 1937009122

=== Collections and anthologies ===
==== Omnibus ====
- Epitaphs: Two Novels of the Dead Past (1999) (contains The Dead Past and Sorrow's Crown) ISBN 0-7394-0218-8

==== Collections ====
- Pentacle (Pirate Writings, 1995), introduction by Jack Cady. ISBN 0-9640168-2-6. Features five short stories that make one continuing narrative:

"Neverdead"
"Bury St. Edmonds"
"Maleficia"
"Paindance"
"Eye-Biting and Other Displays of Affection"

- The Hanging Man and Other Strange Suspensions (1996)
- The Dog Syndrome and Other Sick Puppies (Marietta Publishing, 1997)

"The Dog Syndrome"
"Fellowship"
"Where the Swamp Folk Go When the Need Comes"
"Hostages"
"Water Wears the Stones"
"Lilith at the Playground"

- Deep into that Darkness Peering (Terminal Fright Press, 1999) ISBN 0-9658135-6-8
- A Student of Hell (poetry collection) (2000) ISBN 0-9675774-0-3
- Four Dark Nights (Leisure 2002) (with Douglas Clegg, Christopher Golden, Bentley Little). Featuring the Piccirilli story "Jonah Rose." ISBN 0-8439-5098-6
- This Cape Is Red Because I've Been Bleeding (poetry collection)(Catalyst Press, 2002) ISBN 1-930997-21-3
- Mean Sheep (Delirium Books, 2003) ISBN 1-929653-47-6

"The Misfit Child Grows Fat on Despair"
"The Whole Head is Sick, the Whole Heart Faint"
"This, and That's the End of It"
"New York Comes to the Desert"
"Sentry"
"At One Stride Comes the Dark"
"Her Child Arises"
"Come Back to Tell You All"
"Uneasy Lies the Head that Wears the Crowd"
"Whisper, When You Drown"
"Souls, Written on the Flea"
"Twilight in the Room of Fathers"
"Horsepower"
"A square Wedge of Vanilla"
"Tracking the Death Angel"
"Those Vanished I Recognize"
"Mean Sheep" (poem)
"What You Leave Behind on the Side of Your Plate" (poem)
"In the Outrunning" (poem)
"A Lightning Sting on the Far Side of the Skull" (poem)
"How To Perform Heart Surgery With Someone Else's Gaze" (poem)
"When the First Lemming Drops" (poem)
"The Curve After Which the Engine Squeals" (poem)
"My Conscience Shattered by a Jittery Scrawl" (poem)
"Rye" (poem)
"Staring Into A Bitter Face I've Seen Before" (poem)
"The Living Room" (poem)
"Sylvia" (poem)
"Tragedy As You Like It" (poem)
"45 Seconds On Third Avenue and 8th Street" (poem)
"Another Man's October" (poem)

- Waiting My Turn to Go Under the Knife (poems) (2005)
- A Little Black Book of Noir Stories (Borderlands Press, 2003) ISBN 1-880325-40-3

"Fellowship"
"Seems Like Old Times"
"Horsepower"
"Hostages"
"Inside the Works"
"Diamond Mozzarella"
"Black"

==== Anthologies edited ====
- The Devil's Wine (Cemetery Dance Publications, 2004), a poetry anthology featuring Stephen King, Ray Bradbury, Peter Straub, and many more. ISBN 1-58767-070-4
- Midnight Premiere (Cemetery Dance Publications, 2007), also contains Tom Piccirilli's short story "Shadder." ISBN 978-1-58767-146-3

==== Anthologies containing stories by Tom Piccirilli ====
- 100 Wicked Little Witch Stories (Barnes & Noble, 1995) edited by Stefan R. Dziemianowicz, Martin H. Greenberg, and Robert H. Weinberg. Features the short story, "Sorrow Laughed." ISBN 1-56619-762-7
- Stranger by Night: The Hot Blood Series part VI (1995) edited by Michael Garrett and Jeff Gelb. Features the short story, "Take It as It Comes." ISBN 0-7860-1648-5
- Fear the Fever: The Hot Blod Series part VII (1996) edited by Michael Garrett and Jeff Gelb. Features the short story, "Call It." ISBN 0-7860-1649-3
- White House Horrors (DAW, 1996) edited by Martin H. Greenberg. Features the short story "Broken ’Neath the Weight of Wraiths." ISBN 0-88677-659-7
- Women Who Run with the Werewolves: Tales of Blood, Lust, and Metamorphosis (Cleis Press, 1996) edited by Pam Keesey. Features the short story, "The Hound of God." ISBN 978-1-57344-057-8
- Crimes of Passion: The Hot Blood Series part IX (Pinnacle, 1997) edited by Jeff Gelb, Michael Garrett. Features the short story, "Curs." ISBN 0-7860-1650-7
- Terminal Frights (Terminal Fright, 1997) edited by Kenneth E. Abner Jr. Features the short story, "A Lower Deep." ISBN 0-9658135-2-5
- Cat Crimes Through Time (Carroll & Graf, 1998) edited by Ed Gorman, Martin H. Greenberg, and Larry Segriff. Features the short story "Of Persephone, Poe, and the Whisperer." ISBN 0-7867-0555-8
- Horrors! 365 Scary Stories (Barnes & Noble, 1998) edited by Stefan Dziemianowicz, Robert Weinberg & Martin H. Greenberg. Features the short story, "On the Panecraft Train." ISBN 0-7607-0141-5
- Going Postal (Space & Time, 1998) edited by Gerard Daniel Houarner. Features the short story, "Nietzsche Sooths Fishboy Lenny." ISBN 0-917053-11-7
- More Monsters from Memphis (Zapizdat Publications, 1998), edited by Beecher Smith. Features the short story, "Go Back to the Church." ISBN 1-880964-24-4
- 100 Hilarious Little Howlers (Barnes & Noble, 1999) edited by Stefan Dziemianowicz, Robert Weinberg, and Martin H. Greenberg. Features the short story, "Chasing the Ugly Dog." ISBN 0-7607-1385-5
- Future Crimes (DAW, 1999) edited by Martin H. Greenberg and John Helfers. Features the short story, "The Serpent Was More Subtle." ISBN 0-88677-854-9
- New Mythos Legends (Marietta Publishing, 1999) edited by Bruce Gehweiler. Features the short story, "Of Darkness I Acknowledge Mine." ISBN 1-892669-06-4
- Bad News (Cemetery Dance Publications, 2000) edited by Richard Laymon. Features the short story, "The Whole Head is Sick, the Whole Heart Faint." ISBN 1-881475-95-6
- Star Colonies (DAW, 2000) edited by Martin H. Greenberg, John Helfers, and Ed Gorman. Features the short story, "I am a Graveyard Hated by the Moon." ISBN 0-88677-894-8
- October Dreams (Cemetery Dance Publications, 2000) edited by Richard Chizmar and Robert Morrish. Features the non-fiction piece, "My Favorite Halloween Memory." ISBN 1-58767-019-4
- Corpse Blossoms (Creeping Hemlock Press, 2005) edited by Julia Sevin and R. J. Sevin. Features the short story, ""An Average Insanity, A Common Agony." ISBN 0-9769217-0-7
- Evermore (Arkham House, 2006) edited by James Robert Smith and Stephen Mark Rainey. Features the short story, "Of Persephone, Poe, and the Whisperer." ISBN 0-87054-185-4
- The Death Panel: Murder, Mayhem, and Madness (Comet Press, 2009) edited by Cheryl Mullenax. Features the short story, "Blood Sacrifices & The Catatonic Kid." ISBN 978-0-9820979-9-1
- A Splintered Mind edited by Trent Zelazny.
- Crucified Dreams: Tales of Urban Horror (Tachyon Publications, 2011) edited by Joe R. Lansdale. Features the short story "Loss." ISBN 9781616960032
- Shrieks and Shivers from the Horror Zine (Post Mortem Press, 2015) edited by Jeani Rector. Features the short story "Because What Is Mine Is Mine." ISBN 9780692363911

=== Non-fiction ===
- Welcome to Hell: A Working Guide for the Beginning Writer (2000)
- Deconstructing Tolkien: A Fundamental Analysis of the Lord of the Rings (2004) (with Edward J McFadden, J.R.R. Tolkien and Jane Yolen)
- Introduction to The Well by Jack Cady

== Awards ==
=== Won ===
- Bram Stoker Award for "Best Poetry Collection" (2000) : A Student of Hell
- Bram Stoker Award for "Short Fiction" (2002) : "The Misfit Child Grows Fat on Depair"
- Bram Stoker Award for "Best Novel" (2003) : The Night Class
- Bram Stoker Award for "Best Alternative Forms" (2004): The Devil's Wine
- International Thriller Writers Award for "Best Paperback Original" (2008) : The Midnight Road
- International Thriller Writers Award for "Best Paperback Original" (2010) : The Coldest Mile

=== Nominated ===
- Bram Stoker Award for "Best First Novel" (1991) : Dark Father
- World Fantasy Award for "Best Collection" (2000) : Deep into that Darkness Peering
- Bram Stoker Award for "Best Fiction Collection" (2000) : Deep into that Darkness Peering
- Bram Stoker Award for "Best Novel" (2000) : Hexes
- Bram Stoker Award for "Best Novel" (2001) : The Deceased
- Bram Stoker Award for "Best Long Fiction" (2003) : Fuckin' Lie Down Already
- Bram Stoker Award for "Best Novel" (2005) : November Mourns
- Bram Stoker Award for "Best Anthology" (2007) : Midnight Premiere
- International Thriller Writers Award for "Best Paperback Original" (2007) : Headstone City
- International Thriller Writers Award for "Best Short Story" (2009) : "Between the Dark and the Daylight"
- Mystery Writers of America Edgar Award for "Best Paperback Original" (2008) : "The Cold Spot"

== See also ==
- List of horror fiction authors
