= Bram Stoker Award for Best Non-Fiction =

Literary award

The Bram Stoker Award for Best Non-Fiction is an award presented by the Horror Writers Association (HWA) for "superior achievement" in horror writing for non-fiction. Named for Bram Stoker, the awards were created after the founding of the HWA in 1987.

== Winners and nominees ==
Bram Stoker Award for Best Non-Fiction winners and finalists
Year	Author	Title	Result	Ref.
1987	Muriel Spark	Mary Shelley	Winner	
1987	Joe Bob Briggs	Joe Bob Goes to the Drive-In	Finalist	
1987	Paul A. Gagne	The Zombies That Ate Pittsburgh	Finalist	
1988	(no award)			
1989	Stephen Jones and Kim Newman	Horror: The 100 Best Books	Winner	
1989	Harlan Ellison	Harlan Ellison's Watching	Winner	
1989	Norine Dresser	American Vampires by Fans, Victims, Practitioners	Finalist	
1989	Peter H. Cannon	H. P. Lovecraft	Finalist	
1989	Leonard Wolf	Horror: A Connoisseur's Guide To Literature and Film	Finalist	
1990	Stanley Wiater	Dark Dreamers	Winner	
1990	Joe Bob Briggs	Joe Bob Goes Back to the Drive-In	Finalist	
1990	S. T. Joshi	The Weird Tale	Finalist	
1990	David J. Skal	Hollywood Gothic	Finalist	
1990	Neil Barron	Horror Literature: A Reader's Guide	Finalist	
1991	Stephen Jones	Clive Barker's Shadows in Eden	Winner	
1991	Stephen J. Spignesi	The Shape Under The Sheet: The Complete Stephen King Encyclopedia	Finalist	
1991	Katherine Ramsland	Prism of the Night: A Biography of Anne Rice	Finalist	
1991	Rosemary Ellen Guillen	Vampires Among Us	Finalist	
1992	Christopher Golden	Cut! Horror Writers of Horror Film	Winner	
1992	Carol J. Clover	Men, Women, and Chainsaws	Finalist	
1992	Stanley Wiater	Dark Visions	Finalist	
1992	John Russo	Scare Tactics	Finalist	
1992	Cosette Kies	Young Adult Horror Fiction	Finalist	
1993	Robert Bloch	Once Around the Bloch	Winner	
1993	Shirley Harrison and Michael Barrett	The Diary of Jack the Ripper	Finalist	
1993	David J. Skal	The Monster Show	Finalist	
1994	(no award)			
1995	Michael Ashley and William Contento	The Supernatural Index	Winner	
1995	Janet Leigh and Christopher Nickens	Psycho: Behind the Scenes of the Classic Thriller	Finalist	
1995	Cathal Tohill and Pete Tombs	Immoral Tales: European Sex & Horror Movies 1956-1984	Finalist	
1995	James Randi	An Encyclopedia of Claims, Frauds, and Hoaxes of the Occult and Supernatural	Finalist	
1996	S. T. Joshi	H. P. Lovecraft: A Life	Winner	
1996	Don Hutchison	The Great Pulp Heroes	Finalist	
1996	Stephen Jones	The Illustrated Werewolf Movie Guide	Finalist	
1996	Barbara Belford	Bram Stoker: A Biography of the Author of Dracula	Finalist	
1996	David Skal	V is for Vampire	Finalist	
1997	Stanley Wiater	Dark Thoughts: On Writing	Winner	
1997	John Clute and John Grant	The Encyclopedia of Fantasy	Finalist	
1997	Marcus Hearn and Alan Barnes	The Hammer Story	Finalist	
1997	Tim Lucas, ed.	Video Watchdog	Finalist	
1997	Stephen Jones	Clive Barker's A-Z of Horror	Finalist	
1997	Katherine Ramsland	Dean Koontz: A Writer's Biography	Finalist	
1998	Paula Guran, ed.	DarkEcho Newsletter, Vol. 5, #1-50	Winner	
1998	Clive Bloom, ed.	Gothic Horror: A Reader's Guide from Poe to King and Beyond	Finalist	
1998	Jeanne Cavelos	The Science of the X-Files	Finalist	
1998	Richard Laymon	A Writer's Tale	Finalist	
1999	Paula Guran, ed.	DarkEcho Newsletter	Winner	
1999	David B. Silva and Paul F. Olson, eds.	Hellnotes	Finalist	
1999	Stephen Jones	The Essential Monster Movie Guide	Finalist	
1999	Victoria Price	Vincent Price: A Daughter's Biography	Finalist	
2000	Stephen King	On Writing: A Memoir of the Craft	Winner	
2000	David B. Silva and Paul F. Olson, eds.	Hellnotes	Finalist	
2000	Bill Sheehan	At the Foot of the Story Tree	Finalist	
2000	Robert Weinberg	Horror of the 20th Century	Finalist	
2001	Brian Keene, ed.	Jobs in Hell	Winner	
2001	Brian A. Hopkins and Garrett Peck, eds.	Personal Demons	Finalist	
2001	David B. Silva and Paul F. Olson, eds.	Hellnotes	Finalist	
2001	Bruce Campbell	If Chins Could Kill: Confessions of a B Movie Actor	Finalist	
2002	Ramsey Campbell	Ramsey Campbell, Probably	Winner	
2002	Ralan Conley, ed.	Ralan.com	Finalist	
2002	Brian Keene and Kelly Laymon, eds.	Jobs in Hell	Finalist	
2002	David B. Silva, Paul F. Olson, and Garrett Peck, eds.	Hellnotes	Finalist	
2002	Richard Bleiler	Supernatural Fiction Writers: Fantasy and Horror, Second Edition	Finalist	
2003	Thomas F. Monteleone	The Mothers and Fathers Italian Association	Winner	
2003	Gary A. Braunbeck	Fear in a Handful of Dust	Finalist	
2003	Ralan Conley, ed.	Ralan.com	Finalist	
2003	Gary Spencer Millidge and Smoky Man, eds.	Alan Moore: Portrait of an Extraordinary Gentleman	Finalist	
2003	Judi Rohrig, ed.	Hellnotes	Finalist	
2004	Judi Rohrig, ed.	Hellnotes	Winner	
2004	Thomas F. Monteleone	The Complete Idiot's Guide to Writing a Novel	Finalist	
2004	Bev Vincent	The Road to the Dark Tower	Finalist	
2004	Joseph McCabe	Hanging Out with the Dream King	Finalist	
2004	Ralan Conley	Ralan's SpecFic & Humor Webstravaganza	Finalist	
2005	Stephen Jones and Kim Newman	Horror: Another 100 Best Books	Winner	
2005	Sam Weller	The Bradbury Chronicles	Finalist	
2005	Loren Rhoads	Morbid Curiosity, #9	Finalist	
2005	Michael McCarty	More Giants of the Genre	Finalist	
2005	Rhonda Wilcox	Why Buffy Matters: The Art of 'Buffy the Vampire Slayer'	Finalist	
2006	Michael Largo	Final Exits: The Illustrated Encyclopedia of How We Die	Winner	
2006	Kim Paffenroth	Gospel of the Living Dead: George Romero's Vision of Hell on Earth	Winner	
2006	Mark Morris, ed.	Cinema Macabre	Finalist	
2006	Rocky Wood	Stephen King: Uncollected, Unpublished	Finalist	
2007	Jonathan Maberry and David F. Kramer	The Cryptopedia: A Dictionary of the Weird, Strange & Downright Bizarre	Winner	
2007	Joe Nassise and David Niall Wilson	Storytellers Unplugged	Finalist	
2007	Michael Largo	The Portable Obituary: How the Famous, Rich & Powerful Really Died	Finalist	
2007	Joshua Gee	Encyclopedia Horrifica: The Terrifying Truth About Vampires, Ghosts, Monsters, and More	Finalist	
2008	Lisa Morton	A Hallowe'en Anthology	Winner	
2008	Gregory Lamberson	Cheap Scares	Finalist	
2008	Amy Wallace, Del Howison, and Scott Bradley	The Book of Lists: Horror	Finalist	
2008	Jonathan Maberry	Zombie CSU	Finalist	
2009	Michael Knost	Writers Workshop of Horror	Winner	
2009	L. L. Soares and Michael Arruda	Cinema Knife Fight	Finalist	
2009	Rocky Wood and Justin Brooks	Stephen King: The Non-Fiction	Finalist	
2009	Bev Vincent	The Stephen King Illustrated Companion	Finalist	
2010	Gary A. Braunbeck	To Each Their Darkness	Winner	
2010	Jonathan Maberry and Janice Gable Bashman	Wanted Undead or Alive: Vampire Hunters and Other Kick-Ass Enemies of Evil	Finalist	
2010	Thomas Ligotti	The Conspiracy Against the Human Race: A Contrivance of Horror	Finalist	
2010	Sam Weller	Listen to the Echoes: The Ray Bradbury Interviews	Finalist	
2011	Rocky Wood	Stephen King: A Literary Companion	Winner	
2011	Lesley Pratt Bannatyne	Halloween Nation: Behind the Scenes of America's Fright Night	Finalist	
2011	Gary William Crawford, Jim Rockhill, and Brian J. Showers, eds.	Reflections in a Glass Darkly: Essays on J. Sheridan Le Fanu	Finalist	
2011	John C. Tibbetts	The Gothic Imagination	Finalist	
2011	Matt Mogk	Everything You Ever Wanted to Know About Zombies	Finalist	
2011	Nick Mamatas	Starve Better	Finalist	
2012	Lisa Morton	Trick or Treat: A History of Halloween	Winner	
2012	Leslie S. Klinger	The Annotated Sandman, Volume 1	Finalist	
2012	Kim Paffenroth and John W. Morehead	The Undead and Theology	Finalist	
2012	Kendall R. Phillips	Dark Directions: Romero, Craven, Carpenter, and the Modern Horror Film	Finalist	
2012	Michael Collings	Writing Darkness	Finalist	
2013	William F. Nolan	Nolan on Bradbury: Sixty Years of Writing about the Master of Science Fiction	Winner	
2013	Barbara Brodman and James E. Doan, eds.	Images of the Modern Vampire: The Hip and the Atavistic	Finalist	
2013	Gary William Crawford, ed.	Ramsey Campbell: Critical Essays on the Modern Master of Horror	Finalist	
2013	Robert H. Waugh, ed.	Lovecraft and Influence: His Predecessors and Successors	Finalist	
2013	Jarkko Toikkanen	The Intermedial Experience of Horror: Suspended Failures	Finalist	
2014	Lucy Snyder	Shooting Yourself in the Head For Fun and Profit: A Writer’s Survival Guide	Winner	
2014	Jason V. Brock	Disorders of Magnitude	Finalist	
2014	S. T. Joshi	Lovecraft and a World in Transition	Finalist	
2014	Leslie S. Klinger	The New Annotated H.P. Lovecraft	Finalist	
2014	Joe Mynhardt and Emma Audsley	Horror 101: The Way Forward	Finalist	
2015	Stephen Jones	The Art of Horror	Winner	
2015	Justin Everett and Jeffrey H. Shanks, eds.	The Unique Legacy of Weird Tales: The Evolution of Modern Fantasy and Horror	Finalist	
2015	Joe Mynhardt and Emma Audsley, eds.	Horror 201: The Silver Scream	Finalist	
2015	Michael Knost	Author’s Guide to Marketing with Teeth	Finalist	
2015	Danel Olson	Studies in the Horror Film: Stanley Kubrick’s The Shining (film)	Finalist	
2016	Ruth Franklin	Shirley Jackson: A Rather Haunted Life	Winner	
2016	W. Scott Poole	In the Mountains of Madness	Finalist	
2016	David J. Skal	Something in the Blood	Finalist	
2016	John Tibbetts	The Gothic Worlds of Peter Straub	Finalist	
2016	Danel Olson	Guillermo del Toro’s The Devil's Backbone and Pan’s Labyrinth	Finalist	
2016	Leo Braudy	Haunted	Finalist	
2017	Grady Hendrix	Paperbacks from Hell: The Twisted History of ‘70s and ‘80s Horror Fiction	Winner	
2017	Kinitra D. Brooks	Searching for Sycorax: Black Women’s Hauntings of Contemporary Horror	Finalist	
2017	Joe Mynhardt and Eugene Johnson	Where Nightmares Come From: The Art of Storytelling in the Horror Genre	Finalist	
2017	Stephen Jones	The Art of Horror Movies: An Illustrated History	Finalist	
2017	Michele Brittany	Horror in Space: Critical Essays on a Film Subgenre	Finalist	
2018	Joe Mynhardt and Eugene Johnson	It's Alive: Bringing Your Nightmares to Life	Winner	
2018	Howard David Ingham	We Don't Go Back: A Watcher's Guide to Folk Horror	Finalist	
2018	Kevin. J. Wemore, Jr.	Uncovering Stranger Things: Essays on Eighties Nostalgia, Cynicism and Innocence in the Series	Finalist	
2018	Lee Gambin	The Howling: Studies in the Horror Film	Finalist	
2018	John Connolly	Horror Express	Finalist	
2019	Melanie R. Anderson and Lisa Kröger	Monster, She Wrote: The Women Who Pioneered Horror and Speculative Fiction	Winner	
2019	Harriet E. H. Earle	Gender, Sexuality, and Queerness in American Horror Story: Critical Essays	Finalist	
2019	Jonathan Greenaway and Eleanor Beal	Horror and Religion: New Literary Approaches to Theology, Race, and Sexuality	Finalist	
2019	John B. Kachuba	Shapeshifters: A History	Finalist	
2019	Alexandra Heller-Nicholas	Masks in Horror Cinema: Eyes Without Faces	Finalist	
2020	Tim Waggoner	Writing in the Dark	Winner	
2020	Kelly Florence and Meg Hafdahl	The Science of Women in Horror: The Special Effects, Stunts, and True Stories Behind Your Favorite Fright Films	Finalist	
2020	Alexandra Heller-Nicholas	1000 Women in Horror	Finalist	
2020	Brian Keene	End of the Road	Finalist	
2020	Alison Peirse, ed.	Women Make Horror: Filmmaking, Feminism, Genre	Finalist	
2020	Kevin J. Wetmore, Jr.	The Streaming of Hill House: Essays on the Haunting Netflix Adaption	Finalist	
2021	Michael Knost, ed.	Writers Workshop of Horror 2	Winner	
2021	Danel Olson	9/11 Gothic: Decrypting Ghosts and Trauma in New York City’s Terrorism Novels	Finalist	
2021	Jeffrey Andrew Weinstock and Regina M. Hansen	Giving the Devil His Due: Satan and Cinema	Finalist	
2021	Kevin J. Wetmore, Jr.	Eaters of the Dead: Myths and Realities of Cannibal Monsters	Finalist	
2021	Kristopher Woofter	Shirley Jackson: A Companion	Finalist	
2022	Michael Cisco	Weird Fiction: A Genre Study	Winner	
2022	Leanna Renee Hieberand Andrea Janes	A Haunted History of Invisible Women: True Stories of America’s Ghosts	Finalist	
2022	Lisa Krögerand Melanie R. Anderson	Toil and Trouble: A Women’s History of the Occult	Finalist	
2022	Tim Waggoner	Writing in the Dark: The Workbook	Finalist	
2022	Stephanie M. Wytovich	Writing Poetry in the Dark	Finalist	
2023
2023	Sadie Hartmann	101 Horror Books to Read Before You’re Murdered	Winner	
2023	Robin R. Means Coleman & Mark H. Harris	The Black Guy Dies First: Black Horror Cinema from Fodder to Oscar	Nominee	
2023	Claire Fitzpatrick	A Vindication of Monsters: Essays on Mary Wollstonecraft and Mary Shelley	Nominee	
2023	Lisa Morton	The Art of the Zombie Movie	Nominee	
2023	Lee Murray & Angela Yuriko Smith	Unquiet Spirits: Essays by Asian Women in Horror	Nominee	
2024
2024	Emily C. Hughes	Horror for Weenies: Everything You Need to Know About the Films You’re Too Scared to Watch	Winner	
2024	Anna Bogutskaya	Feeding the Monster: Why Horror Has a Hold on Us	Nominee	
2024	Jeremy Dauber	American Scary: A History of Horror, from Salem to Stephen King and Beyond	Nominee	
2024	Heidi Honeycutt	I Spit on Your Celluloid: The History of Women Directing Horror Movies	Nominee	
2024	Cassandra O’Sullivan Sachar	No More Haunted Dolls: Horror Fiction that Transcends the Tropes	Nominee	
2025	Becky Siegel Spratford	Why I Love Horror: Essays on Horror Fiction	Winner	
2025	Brandon R. Grafius & John W. Morehead	The Oxford Handbook of Biblical Monsters	Finalist	
2025	Leanna Renee Hieber & Andrea Janes	America’s Most Gothic	Finalist	
2025	Coltan Scrivner	Morbidly Curious: A Scientist Explains Why We Can’t Look Away	Finalist	
2025	Naomi Simone Borwein	Global Indigenous Horror	Finalist	

== See also ==
- Bibliography of works on Dracula
