= Lisa Morton =

American horror author and screenwriter (born 1958)

- Born: December 11, 1958 (age 67); Pasadena, California, United States
- Occupations: screenwriter, horror author

Lisa Morton (born December 11, 1958) is an American horror author and screenwriter.

== Biography ==
Morton was born in Pasadena, California, and entered the film industry in 1979 as a modelmaker on Star Trek: The Motion Picture. In 1988 she co-wrote (with make-up effects expert Tom Burman) Life On the Edge, which was later re-titled Meet the Hollowheads; she also served as an Associate Producer on the film, and received an acting credit as "the Edge Slut" (in a scene that was cut from the film). The film was shown at the Odeon London Film Festival, was selected to appear in London's Shock Around the Clock Film Festival for 1989 and was one of 12 films selected to appear in the Avoriaz Film Festival.

Morton also co-wrote the films Adventures in Dinosaur City, Tornado Warning, and Blood Angels. As an animation writer, she wrote for the series Sky Dancers and Dragon Flyz.

In the 1990s, Morton began publishing short horror fiction. In 2006, her short story "Tested" (from Cemetery Dance) won the Bram Stoker Award for Short Fiction. In 2009, she edited the anthology Midnight Walk, and her first novella, The Lucid Dreaming, was published by Bad Moon Books and went on to win the Bram Stoker Award for Best Long Fiction.

Her second novella, The Samhanach, was nominated for the Bram Stoker Award for Best Long Fiction, and was named the top pick in the 2011 reviewer poll by Monster Librarian.

Her first novel, The Castle of Los Angeles, was published in 2010 by Gray Friar Press. It won the Bram Stoker Award for Best First Novel (tie) and was nominated for “Best Small Press Chill” by the 4th Annual Dark Scribe Awards.

Her 2013 novel Malediction was nominated for the Bram Stoker Award for Best Novel.

Morton has also worked as an editor. Her anthology Midnight Walk (2009) received a nomination for the Bram Stoker Award for Best Anthology and won the Black Quill Award for Best Dark Genre Anthology. Her 2017 Halloween-themed anthology Haunted Nights (co-edited with Ellen Datlow) received a starred review from Publishers Weekly.

Her 2019 anthology Ghost Stories: Classic Tales of Horror and Suspense (co-edited with Leslie S. Klinger) was named a Publishers Weekly Pick of the Week.

Morton has written three non-fiction books on the history of Halloween: The Halloween Encyclopedia (2003, second edition published in 2011); A Hallowe'en Anthology: Literary and Historical Writings Over the Centuries (2008), which was nominated for the Black Quill Award and won the Bram Stoker Award for Best Non-Fiction; and Trick or Treat: A History of Halloween (2012), which won the Bram Stoker Award for Best Non-Fiction and the Halloween Book Festival Grand Prize Award.

She has also been interviewed for The History Channel's documentary The Real Story of Halloween, the supplement The Lore and Legends of Halloween on the Blu Ray release of Trick 'r Treat, the How Halloween Has Changed episode of AHCTV's America: Fact Vs. Fiction, and Coast to Coast AM with George Noory.

Her other non-fiction books include The Cinema of Tsui Hark (2001) and Savage Detours: The Life and Work of Ann Savage (2010, co-authored with Kent Adamson), and Ghosts: A Haunted History (2014).

Her non-fiction articles have appeared in such books as The Art of Horror (2015), The Oxford Companion to Sugar and Sweets (2015), Birthing Monsters: Frankenstein's Cabinet of Curiosities and Cruelties (2018), and It's Alive: Bringing Your Nightmares to Life (2018). She frequently interviews other authors for Nightmare Magazine and has provided feature articles for Shudder's newsletter The Bite.

She co-authored (with Rocky Wood, art by Greg Chapman) the non-fiction graphic novel Witch Hunts: A Graphic History of the Burning Times (2012), which received the Bram Stoker Award for Best Graphic Novel.

From 2014 to 2019, Morton served as president of the Horror Writers Association.

A California native, she currently resides in Los Angeles, California.

== Awards ==
- 2005 President's Richard Laymon Award from the Horror Writers Association
- 2006 President's Richard Laymon Award from the Horror Writers Association
- Tested (2006 Bram Stoker Award for Best Short Fiction)
- A Hallowe'en Anthology: Literary and Historical Writings Over the Centuries (2nd Annual Black Quill Award nominee)
- A Hallowe'en Anthology: Literary and Historical Writings Over the Centuries (2008 Bram Stoker Award for Best Non-Fiction)
- The Lucid Dreaming (2009 Bram Stoker Award for Best Long Fiction)
- Midnight Walk (2009), Nominated for the Bram Stoker Award for Best Anthology
- Midnight Walk (3rd Annual Black Quill Award winner for Best Dark Genre Anthology)
- The Castle of Los Angeles (2010), Bram Stoker Award for Best First Novel
- The Samhanach (2010), Nominated for the Bram Stoker Award for Best Long Fiction
- Monsters of L.A. (2011), Nominated for the Bram Stoker Award for Best Fiction Collection
- Trick or Treat: A History of Halloween (2012), Halloween Book Festival Grand Prize
- Trick or Treat: A History of Halloween Bram Stoker Award for Best Non-Fiction
- Witch Hunts: A Graphic History of the Burning Times (2012), Bram Stoker Award for Best Graphic Novel
- Malediction (2013), Nominated for the Bram Stoker Award for Novel
- Bram Stoker Award for Lifetime Achievement (2025)

== Bibliography ==
=== Novels and collections ===
- The Castle of Los Angeles, Gray Friar Press (2010)
- The Monsters of L.A., Bad Moon Books (2011)
- Malediction (2013)
- Netherworld (2014)
- Zombie Apocalypse!: Washington Deceased (2014)
- Cemetery Dance Select: Lisa Morton (collection, 2015)
- The Samhanach and Other Halloween Treats (collection, 2017)

=== Non-fiction ===
- The Cinema of Tsui Hark, McFarland & Company 2001
- The Halloween Encyclopedia, McFarland & Company 2003
- A Hallowe'en Anthology: Literary and Historical Writings Over the Centuries, McFarland & Company 2008
- Savage Detours: The Life and Work of Ann Savage, McFarland & Company 2010
- Trick or Treat: A History of Halloween, Reaktion Books 2012
- Ghosts: A Haunted History, Reaktion Books 2015
- Adventures in the Scream Trade (2016)
- The Art of the Zombie Movie (2023)

=== Novellas ===
- The Free Way (1995)
- The Lucid Dreaming, Bad Moon Books 2009
- Diana and the Goong-si (2009) Midnight Walk
- The Samhanach (2010)
- Wild Girls (2012)
- Hell Manor (2012)
- Summer's End (2013)
- Smog (2013)
- The Lower Animals (2013) (prequel to her novel Malediction)
- By Insanity of Reason (with John R. Little) (2014)
- The Devil's Birthday (2014)

=== Anthologies edited ===
- Midnight Walk, Darkhouse Publishing 2009
- Halloween Spirits: 11 Tales for the Darkest Night (2011)
- 25: Celebrating a Quarter-Century of HWA (2012)
- Haunted Nights (co-edited with Ellen Datlow) (2017)
- Ghost Stories: Classic Tales of Horror and Suspense (co-edited with Leslie S. Klinger) (2019)

=== Graphic novels ===
- Witch Hunts: A Graphic History of the Burning Times (2012) (co-authored with Rocky Wood)

=== Short stories ===
Dates by original magazine or anthology publication.

- Sane Reaction (1994) Dark Voices 6
- Virus Verses (1995) Dream Forge May 1995 issue
- Sensitive (1995) After Hours Winter 1995 issue
- The Free Way (1995) chapbook
- Poppi's Monster (1995) The Mammoth Book of Frankenstein
- Love Eats (1996) Dark Terrors
- Children of the Long Night (1997) The Mammoth Book of Dracula
- Nikola, Moonstruck (1998) Horrors! 365 Scary Stories
- Ghost Writer (1998) Horrors! 365 Scary Stories
- The Fear of Eight Legs (1998) Horrors! 365 Scary Stories
- The Proof in the Picture (1998) Horrors! 365 Scary Stories
- A New Force of Nature (1999) White of the Moon
- El Cazador (2000) After Shocks
- Pound Rots in Fragrant Harbour (2003) The Museum of Horrors
- The Call of Cthulhu: The Motion Picture (2003) Dead But Dreaming
- Growing Man (2003) Framed: A Gallery of Dark Delicacies
- The Death of Splatter (2004) Dark Terrors 6
- Blind-Stamped (2005) Shelf Life: Fantastic Stories Celebrating Bookstores
- Home Intrusion (2005) Hell Hath No Fury
- Black Mill Cove (2005) Dark Delicacies: Original Tales of Terror and the Macabre
- Sparks Fly Upward (2006) Mondo Zombie
- Cold Duty (2006) At the Sign of the Snowman: Rolling Darkness Revue 2006
- Tested (2006) Cemetery Dance issue #55
- Forces of Evil, Starring Robert Fields (2007) Midnight Premiere (written with Richard Grove)
- The Maenads (2008) The Vault of Punk Horror
- The Last Resort (2008) Dark Passions: Hot Blood XIII
- Golden Eyes (2008) Horror Library Volume 3
- Double Walker (2008) Unspeakable Horror: From the Shadows of the Closet
- Unlucky (2008) Crimewave issue #10
- Giallo (2009) Horror World March 2009
- The Devil Came to Mamie's on Hallowe'en (2009) Cemetery Dance #60
- The End (2009) Cinema Spec: Tales of Hollywood and Fantasy
- Black Friday (2009) Horror Drive-In August 2009
- Joe and Abel in the Field of Rest (2009) The Dead That Walk
- They're Coming to Get You (2010) Zombie Apocalypse
- Silk City (2010) The Bleeding Edge
- Blood for the American People (2012) Horror For Good: A Charitable Anthology (Volume 1)
- The Rush (2012), Slices of Flesh
- When Harry Killed Sally (2012), Attic Toys
- Old Macdonald had an Animal Farm (2012), Blood Lite 3
- World Without End (2012), I Will Rise
- The Secret Engravings (2012), Danse Macabre
- Day of the Dead (2012), Zombie Apocalypse!: Fightback
- Pontianak (2012), Dark Discoveries, issue 21 (Fall 2012), issue includes interview with Morton
- The Legend of Halloween Jack (2012), Cemetery Dance (ebook)
- The True Worth of Orthography (2013), Blood Rites
- Angel Killer (2013), Nightscapes: Volume I
- The Resurrection Policy (2013), After Death
- Red Ink (2013), Shadow Masters
- The Willowstown Women's Cut and Dye Club (2013), Barbers & Beauties
- Coming to Day (2013), The Haunted Mansion Project #2
- Golden State (2013), Dark Fusion: Where Monsters Lurk
- Feel the Noise (2013), Shivers VII
- Hollywood Hannah (2013), Psycho-Mania
- Zolamin and the Mad God (2013), Deepest, Darkest Eden
- Alive-Oh (2013), The Horror Zine
- The Rivet Gang (2014), Rocketeer: Jet Powered Adventures
- She Devil-a-Go Go (2014), Hell Comes to Hollywood 2
- Kevin Needs to Talk About Us (2014), Zombie Apocalypse!: Endgame
- Tamlane (2014), Out of Tune
- The Christmas Spirit (2014), Haunted Holidays
- Bitter Shadows (2014), Madness on the Orient Express
- Sexy Pirate Girl (2014), October Dreams 2
- The Halloween Collector (2014), Halloween Forevermore (website)
- Daddy's Girl (2015), Shrieks and Shivers from The Horror Zine
- The Ogre (2015), Shadows Over Main Street
- A Girl's Life (2015), Innsmouth Nightmares
- Union Day (2015), Occupied Earth
- The Maze (2015), Dark Hallows
- Woolen Shirts and Gum Boots (2015), Blurring the Line
- The New War (2015), Dark Screams Volume 4
- Finding Ulalume (2015), nEvermore
- Father of Ab (2015), Curse of the Blue Nile
- Down But Not Out at the End of the World (2016), Silent Screams
- Cognition (2016), Madhouse
- Ant Farm (2016), Drive-In Creature Feature
- In the Garden (2016), The Beauty of Death
- Erasure (2016), Cemetery Riots
- St. Thomas of El Paso (2016), Tales From the Lake (Vol. 2)
- One Night With the King of Lizards (2016), Scales and Tails
- Trigger Fate (2016), The Third Spectral Book of Horror
- The Fool on the Hill (2016), Dread State
- Silver Nitrate Blues (2016), Ghosts for Christmas
- The Enchanted Forest (2016), Dark Hallows II
- High Desert (2017), The Forsaken
- The Rich are Different (2017), Dark Screams (Vol. 6)
- LaRue's Dime Museum (2017), Behold!: Oddities, Curiosities, and Undefinable Wonders
- Eyes of the Beholders (2017), Adam's Ladder
- La Hacienda de los Muertos (2017), Halloween Carnival
- The Wash (2017), The Beauty of Death 2: Death By Water
- The Perfect House (2017), Dead Ends
- Black Jack Lonegan and the City of Dreams (2017), CEA Greatest Anthology Written
- Hallowe'en in Blue and Gray (2017), The Horror Zine (October 2017)
- The Dead Thing (2018), 100 Word Horrors
- Ofrenda (2018), Unspeakable Horror 2: Abominations of Desire
- Summer of Sharks (2018), Scream and Scream Again
- The Ultimate Halloween Party App (2018), The Mammoth Book of Halloween Stories
- Job No. 34264 (2018), 18 Wheels of Science Fiction
- The Dreams in the White House and Cool Air (2018), The Lovecraft Squad: Dreaming
- The Joys of Christmas (2018), Collected Christmas Horror Shorts 2
- Dr. Morbismo's InsaniTERRORium Horror Show (2018), Pop the Clutch: Thrilling Tales of Rockabilly, Monsters, and Hot Rod Horror
- The Gorgon (2019), Shivers VIII
- Whatever Happened to Lorna Winters? (2019), Odd Partners
- Holding Back (2019), A Secret Guide to Fighting Elder Gods
- A Housekeeper's Revenge (2019), Weird Tales

=== Poetry ===
- Bodega Bay, 2004 (2011), A Sea of Alone: Poems for Alfred Hitchcock
- The Straw Man (2016), HWA Poetry Showcase Vol. 3
- Meeting the Elemental (2019), HWA Poetry Showcase Vol. 6

=== Miscellaneous ===
- Acts of Darkness: Writing Horror for the Small Stage (2007), On Writing Horror Revised Edition
- Lisa Morton's Top Ten Asian Horror Movies and Five Scary Traditional Halloween Stories (2008), The Book of Lists: Horror
- Smart Broads and Tough Guys: The Strange World of Vintage Paperbacks (2008), Clarkesworld July 2008
- Why Writing Horror Screenplays is REALLY Scary (2009), Writers Workshop of Horror
- Putting the Lie to the Inner Slasher (2011), Butcher Knives and Body Counts
- The Walking Dead and The Dance of Death (2011), The Triumph of The Walking Dead
- Sisters are Killin' it for Themselves: Women in Horror (2012), Telling Tales of Terror
- Introduction (2013), Deep Cuts: Mayhem, Menace, and Misery (anthology)
- Introduction (2013), The Last Night of October (novella by Greg Chapman)
- Introduction (2013), Little by Little (collection by John R. Little)
- The Setting in Horror (2014), Now Write: Science Fiction, Fantasy, and Horror
- Halloween on Television (2014), October Dreams 2
- Foreword (2015), The Best of Horror Library Volumes 1-5 (anthology)
- Halloween (2015), The Oxford Companion to Sugar and Sweets
- Halloween Horrors (2015), The Art of Horror
- The Skeptic's Guide to Ghost Hunting (2016), Gamut Magazine #1
- Introduction (2016), All That Withers (collection by John Palisano)
- The Evil ‘80s (2017), The Art of Horror Movies
- Introduction (2017), The Burden of Indigo (novel by Gene O'Neill)
- Introduction (2017), StokerCon 2017 Souvenir Book
- Drive-in Delinquents (2017), The Art of Pulp Horror
- Introduction (2018), StokerCon 2018 Souvenir Anthology
- The H-Word: Dementia and the Horror Writer (2018), Nightmare Magazine (May 2018)
- Not a Princess Anymore: How the Casting of Winona Ryder in Stranger Things Speaks to the Essential Falsehood of 1980s Media Depictions of the American Working Class (2018), Uncovering Stranger Things: Essays on Eighties Nostalgia, Cynicism and Innocence in the Series
- When It's Their World: Writing for the Themed Anthology (2018), It's Alive: Bringing Your Nightmares to Life
- Fantamagoriana; or, The Ghost Stories That Galvanized Frankenstein (2018) Birthing Monsters: Frankenstein's Cabinet of Curiosities and Cruelties
- Foreword (2019), Horror Literature from Gothic to Post-Modern: Critical Essays

== Filmography ==
- Meet the Hollowheads (1989)
- Adventures in Dinosaur City (1992)
- Toontown Kids (1994)
- Dragon Flyz (1996)
- Sky Dancers (television series) (1996)
- Van-Pires (television series) (1997)
- Blue Demon (2004)
- Blood Angels (aka Thralls) (2004)
- Glass Trap (2005)
- Tornado Warning (2012)

== See also ==
- List of horror fiction authors
