= Jason V. Brock =

American writer, artist, filmmaker, musician

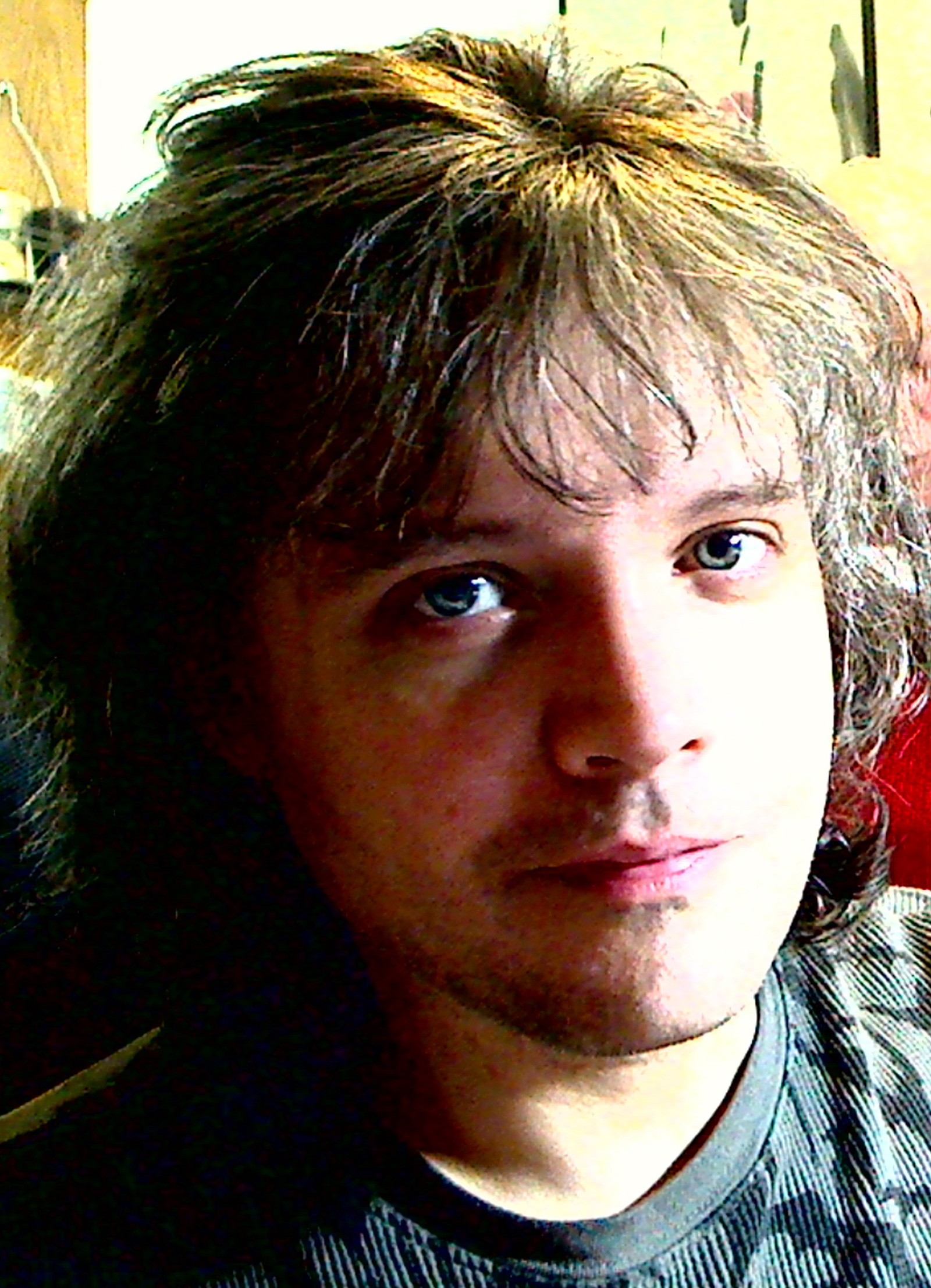
- Brock in 2013
- Born: Jason Vincent Brock; March 1, 1970 (age 56); Charlotte, North Carolina, U.S.
- Occupations: Filmmaker; editor; artist; scholar; lecturer; writer; musician
- Spouse: Sunni K. Brock (m. 2004)
- Writing career
- Period: 2005–present
- Genres: Horror; science fiction; speculative fiction; magic realism; poetry; non-fiction; comics
- Notable works: Milton's Children; Disorders of Magnitude; A Darke Phantastique; The AckerMonster Chronicles!
- Notable awards: Rondo Hatton Classic Horror Award winner, 2013 (Best Documentary)
- Website: www.jasunni.com

Jason Vincent Brock (born March 1, 1970) is an American author, artist, scholar, musician, editor and filmmaker.

He is the CEO and co-founder (with his wife, Sunni) of JaSunni Productions, LLC, whose documentary films include Charles Beaumont: The Short Life of Twilight Zone’s Magic Man, the Rondo Hatton Classic Horror Award-winning The AckerMonster Chronicles!, and Image, Reflection, Shadow: Artists of the Fantastic. He is also the author of Totems and Taboos, a compilation of his poetry and artwork; and an editor, along with William F. Nolan, of The Bleeding Edge: Dark Barriers, Dark Frontiers and The Devil's Coattails: More Dispatches from the Dark Frontier anthologies published by Cycatrix Press. Brock shares story credit (he was Lead Story Consultant and Lead Designer) on the Logan’s Run: Last Day and related comic book series from Bluewater Productions. He is also a writer for the comic book/graphic novel, Tales from William F. Nolan's Dark Universe (also from Bluewater).

He served as managing editor/contributor and art director for Dark Discoveries magazine for over four years. His novella, Milton’s Children, was published by Bad Moon Books in early 2013. In addition to award wins and nominations, Brock's work has generally been well-received, and his poetry, short stories, nonfiction articles, introductions and essays have been widely published internationally online, as well as in dozens of horror, science fiction and fantasy books and scholarly print magazines (Fangoria, Dark Discoveries, Calliope, Comic-Con International's Souvenir Book, Weird Fiction Review [print edition], American Rationalist [an organ of the Center for Inquiry], etc.), and multiple anthologies working with a wide array of publishers and editors (Butcher Knives and Body Counts, S. T. Joshi's Black Wings series, Matt Cardin's Teeming Brain website and his book Horror Literature Through History, Animal Magnetism, and so on). A content expert in multiple areas, he has been a frequent special guest and panelist at many horror and science fiction conventions (such as Necronomicon-Providence, MythosCon, Norwescon, Crypticon, World Horror Convention, World Fantasy Convention, and others) and film festivals (including the H. P. Lovecraft Film Festival, Buffalo International Film Festival, Lovecraft's Visions, etc.). He has also been a guest lecturer and speaker at various colleges and universities (including at the invitation of James E. Gunn to the University of Kansas Center for the Study of Science Fiction). In 2015, at the invitation of author Greg Bear, Brock and Nolan contributed writings, along with others, as examples from significant Washington State authors to the Washington Centennial Time Capsule. A sealing ceremony was held in the state capital of Olympia, Washington. In late 2015, he was featured as the Editor Guest of Honor at the largest science fiction convention in Oregon, OryCon 37.

== Biography ==
Brock was born in Charlotte, North Carolina of mixed racial heritage, and has dyslexia. His father, James Brock, was a freelance journalist and graphic designer. His stepfather, Danny Thomas, was a drummer for the 13th Floor Elevators. As a teenager, Brock led the progressive rock/avant-garde band ChiaroscurO in Charlotte for about five years; the band had several lineup changes, but played live on a regular basis, and produced multiple original demos which Brock is remastering for eventual release, along with new material. He also assisted his father in writing and design. He later worked for James Robert Smith (editor, and author, The Flock) at a comic book store where he met many like-minded individuals and honed his creative writing and artistic skills. After that, he worked as a graphic designer for Morris Costumes in their catalog department, then as an artist's apprentice for Pat Piro, and later as an audio engineer trainee at Reflection Sound Studio under Mark Williams, in addition to assisting on several low-budget movie efforts in his spare time (including a brief period with filmmakers Harry Joyner and Jet Eller).

Brock has lived on the West Coast since 1993, spending time in Seattle, Los Angeles and Vancouver, Washington. He has been married to writer and computer technologist Sunni K Brock since 2004. A practicing Stoic, he is a longtime ethical vegetarian and animal rights enthusiast, politically liberal, and has characterized himself as a "soft" atheist with "Buddhist and Hindu leanings". He describes his written work as Dark Magical Realism. Prior to becoming a full-time creative, he was an award-winning Field Service Engineer and Regional Manager for several photo companies (Kits/Ritz Cameras, Konica Quality Photo West) before working as a Product Specialist for Fuji Photo Film; he left to form (with his wife) JaSunni Productions, LLC in 2005.

== Major works ==
=== Single-author fiction collections ===
- Simulacrum and Other Possible Realities, softcover horror/science fiction short story and poetry collection. Author and illustrator. Preface by William F. Nolan; Introduction by James Robert Smith. Hippocampus Press, 2013.
- The Dark Sea Within and Other Macabre Revelations, softcover horror/science fiction short story and poetry collection. Author and illustrator. Hippocampus Press, 2017.

=== Single-author nonfiction collections ===
- Disorders of Magnitude: A Survey of Dark Fantasy, hardcover nonfiction collection. Author. Scarecrow Press, 2014. Horror Writers Association Bram Stoker Award Finalist (Nonfiction) for 2014. Rondo Hatton Classic Horror Awards Finalist (Best Book) for 2014.

=== Single-author poetry collections ===
- Totems and Taboos, softcover poetry chapbook collection and art. Author and illustrator. Cycatrix Press, 2005.

=== Novels, novellas, and novelettes ===
- Milton’s Children, hardcover and softcover novelette rooted in Lovecraftian traditions, horror, and science fiction. Author and illustrator. Bad Moon Books, 2013.

=== Comics and graphic novels ===
- Logan's Run: Last Day. Lead Story/Lead Costume Design; Comic, Radio Dramatization/CD, Graphic Novel. Bluewater Productions, 2009–2011.
- Logan's Run: Aftermath. Lead Story/Lead Costume Design; Comic, Radio Dramatization/CD, Graphic Novel. Bluewater Productions, 2011–2012.
- Logan's Run: Solo. Writer; Comic and Graphic Novel. Bluewater Productions, 2013.
- Tales from William F. Nolan's Dark Universe. Writer; Comic. Bluewater Productions, 2013. A Graphic Novel version was published in 2017.
- Tales from the Acker-Mansion. Contributor (writer). Edited by Holly Interlandi. American Gothic Press, 2016.

=== As editor (books) ===
- The Bleeding Edge: Dark Barriers, Dark Frontiers, hardcover fiction anthology. Contributor and editor (with William F. Nolan), publisher, and illustrator. All original anthology, including new works from Joe R. Lansdale, John Shirley, and others. Cycatrix Press, 2009. Re-issued in softcover by Hippocampus Press, 2015. Editor Ellen Datlow selected the Cody Goodfellow story "At the Riding School" as the lead entry for The Best Horror of the Year: Volume 3.
- The Devil's Coattails: More Dispatches from the Dark Frontier, hardcover fiction anthology. Contributor and editor (with William F. Nolan), publisher, and illustrator. All original anthology, including new works from Ramsey Campbell, Richard Selzer, many more. Cycatrix Press, 2011.
- Like a Dead Man Walking, hardcover fiction collection by William F. Nolan. Contributor and editor. Centipede Press, 2013. Re-issued in softcover by Dark Regions Press, 2015.
- A Darke Phantastique: Encounters with the Uncanny and Other Magical Things, massive hardcover fiction anthology. Contributor and editor, publisher, and illustrator. All original anthology, including new works from Ray Garton, Nancy Kilpatrick, more than 40 others. Cycatrix Press, 2014. Horror Writers Association Bram Stoker Award Finalist (Anthology) for 2014.
- Discoveries: Best of Horror and Dark Fantasy, hardcover and softcover fiction anthology reprinting the most-popular works from the genre magazine Dark Discoveries. Contributor and editor (with James R. Beach). Dark Regions Press, 2016.
- Masters of the Weird Tale: William F. Nolan, massive hardcover fiction collection spanning the career of William F. Nolan. Contributor and editor. Centipede Press, 2019.
- Writing As Life, hardcover nonfiction collection spanning the career of William F. Nolan. Contributor and editor. Dark Regions Press, 2020.
- Future Weird, softcover fiction anthology featuring new and reprint stories of non-Lovecraftian Weird stories, including works from James E. Gunn, William F. Nolan, John Shirley, F. Paul Wilson, William Hope Hodgson, and many more. Contributor and editor. Hippocampus Press, 2025.

=== As editor (periodicals) ===
- Dark Discoveries Magazine (2009–2013). Print. Managing Editor, Art Director, contributor, creator of social media (Facebook and Twitter); webmistress was Sunni Brock.
- Nameless Digest (2011–present). Print and online. Art Director, Managing Editor with S. T. Joshi. Also a website and social media presence.

=== As publisher (others) ===
- The Mirrors, debut softcover fiction collection by author Nicole Cushing. Introduction by S. T. Joshi. Publisher. Cycatrix Press, 2015. Horror Writers Association Bram Stoker Award Finalist (Collection) for 2015.
- Soul Trips, softcover poetry chapbook collection by William F. Nolan. Publisher. Cycatrix Press, 2016.
- All That Withers, debut softcover fiction collection by author John Palisano. Introduction by Lisa Morton; Afterword by Gene O'Neill. Publisher. Cycatrix Press, 2016.
- Gothic Lovecraft, hardcover fiction anthology by editors Lynn Jamneck and S. T. Joshi. Publisher. Cycatrix Press, 2016.
- Disexistence, softcover fiction collection by author Paul Kane. Introduction by Nancy Holder. Publisher. Cycatrix Press, 2017.
- It Only Comes Out at Night and Other Stories, softcover re-issue of hardcover fiction collection from Centipede Press by author Dennis Etchison with extra material and new artwork. Introduction by S. T. Joshi. Publisher. Cycatrix Press, 2018.

=== Films ===
- Charles Beaumont: The Life of Twilight Zone’s Magic Man, a documentary about the late writer for film, Playboy, Rogue, and The Twilight Zone, featuring exclusive interviews with Richard Matheson, Roger Corman, William Shatner, Nolan, Johnson, and more. Director/Writer/Producer. Distributed by Sonique Theatre Media; JaSunni Productions, LLC, 2010. The film was invited to have its World Premiere at an event hosted by Sid Grauman's historic Egyptian Theatre in Hollywood, California, in March 2010.
- The AckerMonster Chronicles!, documentary about super-fan, Famous Monsters of Filmland editor, agent, and Vampirella creator Forrest J Ackerman. The film contains exclusive interviews with Dan O'Bannon, John Landis, Joe Dante, Ray Bradbury, and others. Director/writer/producer. Distributed by Sonique Theatre Media; JaSunni Productions, LLC, 2012. The film was invited to have its World Premiere at the historic Aero Theatre in Santa Monica, California in 2013. Rondo Hatton Classic Horror Awards Winner (Best Documentary) for 2014.
- Image, Reflection, Shadow: Artists of the Fantastic, documentary regarding metaphorical imagery from Hieronymus Bosch to the present, including surrealism, symbolism, and fantastic realism, and featuring exclusive interviews with H. R. Giger, Ernst Fuchs, Alex Grey, Roger Dean, Kris Kuksi, Laurie Lipton, and a host of others. Director/writer/producer. Distributed by Sonique Theatre Media; JaSunni Productions, LLC, 2025.

== Affiliations and memberships ==
- Member, Horror Writers Association (HWA)
- Member, Science Fiction and Fantasy Writers of America (SFWA)
- Member, International Association for the Fantastic in the Arts (IAFA)
- Member, Rod Serling Memorial Foundation
- Member, Photo Marketing Association (PMA)
- Member, Certified Photographic Consultants (CPC)
- Member, Society of Photofinishing Engineers (SPFE)

== Awards and nominations ==
Category, year, and nominated work	Awards body	Result
Book and Jacket Design, 2010 The Bleeding Edge	Pacific Printing Industries Association (PPI)	Won
Book and Jacket Design, 2012 The Devil's Coattails	Pacific Printing Industries Association (PPI)	Won
Best Documentary, 2013 The AckerMonster Chronicles!	Rondo Hatton Classic Horror Awards	Won
Best Book, 2014 Disorders of Magnitude	Rondo Hatton Classic Horror Awards	Nominated
Superior Achievement in Anthology, 2014 A Darke Phantastique	Bram Stoker Awards	Nominated
Superior Achievement in Nonfiction, 2014 Disorders of Magnitude	Bram Stoker Awards	Nominated
