= Brian Pinkerton =

American author

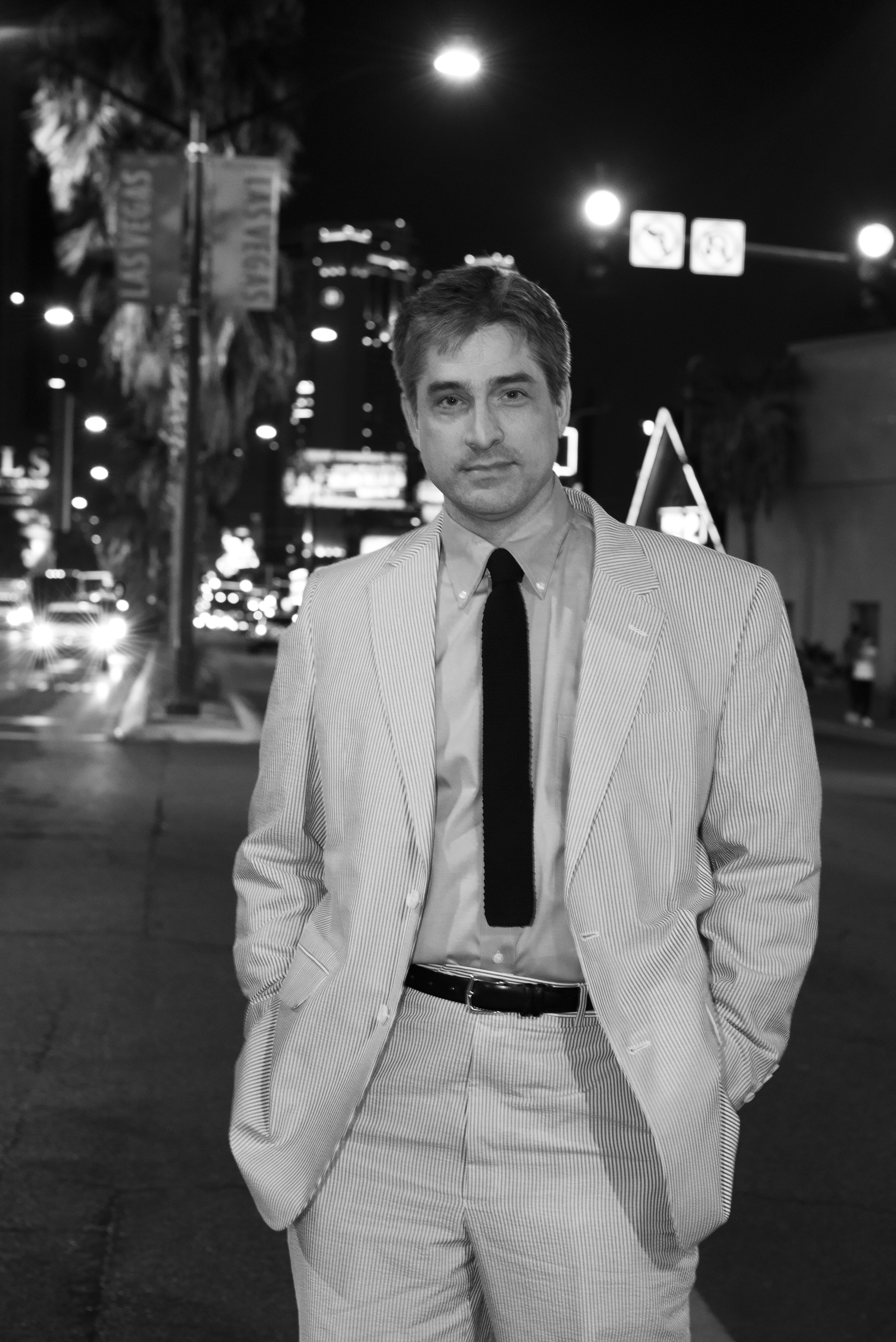
- Pinkerton in 2013
- Education: University of Iowa (BA); Northwestern University
- Occupation: Author
- Writing career
- Genres: Thriller; mystery fiction; science fiction; horror fiction
- Website: brianpinkerton.com

Brian Pinkerton is an American author of fiction in the suspense, thriller, mystery, science fiction and horror genres. He received his B.A. from the University of Iowa and Master's Degree from Northwestern University.

== Select bibliography ==
=== Novels ===
- Abducted (Leisure Books, Dorchester Publishing, 2004; Crossroad Press, 2017)
- Vengeance (Leisure Books, Dorchester Publishing, 2005)
- Killer's Diary (King's Way Press, 2010; Samhain Publishing, 2013; Crossroad Press, 2024)
- Rough Cut (Bad Moon Books, 2011; Dark Arts Books, 2017)
- How I Started The Apocalypse (Severed Press, 2012; reissued with new cover art, 2015) – introduction by Hugh Howey
- How I Started The Apocalypse, Book Two: The Hunger War (Severed Press, 2013; reissued with new cover art, 2015)
- Bender (Crossroad Press, 2014)
- Anatomy of Evil (Samhain Publishing, 2015)
- How I Started The Apocalypse, Book Three: Zombie Regime (Severed Press, 2015)
- The Gemini Experiment (Flame Tree Publishing, 2019)
- Time Warp - A Twisted Love Story (Crossroad Press, 2020)
- The Nirvana Effect (Flame Tree Publishing, 2021)
- The Intruders (Flame Tree Publishing, 2023)
- The Perfect Stranger (Flame Tree Publishing, 2025)

=== Short stories ===
- "Lower Wacker Blues" – appears in the anthology Chicago Blues (Bleak House Books, 2007)
- "SWAT" – appears in the anthology Zombie Zoology (Severed Press, 2010)
- "Now Look What You Did" – appears in the anthology PULP! 2013 Winter/Spring (Twit Publishing, 2013)
- "The Larson County Scare-O-Rama Show" – appears in The Horror Zine (November 2014)
- "The Witness" – Shallow Waters Flash Fiction (Crystal Lake Publishing, 2022)
- "The Rating Game" – appears in The Horror Zine (April 2022, April 2024)
- "Filler" – appears in the anthology Fragile (Roshambo Publishing, 2024)

=== Collections ===
- How I Started the Apocalypse: Omnibus Edition - compiles the three-book series in one volume (Dark Arts Books, 2024)

=== Audio books ===
- Abducted – unabridged, narrated by Beth Richmond (Books in Motion, 2009)
- Vengeance – unabridged, narrated by Dave Courvoisier (Books in Motion, 2010)
- Killer's Diary – unabridged, narrated by Talmadge Ragan (Crossroad Press, 2017)
- Bender – unabridged, narrated by Chet Williamson (Crossroad Press, 2017)
- The Gemini Experiment – unabridged, narrated by Lance C. Fuller (Flame Tree Publishing, 2019)
- Time Warp - A Twisted Love Story – unabridged, narrated by Joshua Saxon (Crossroad Press, 2020)

=== eBook editions ===
Pinkerton's novels have also been issued in eBook format by various publishers.

=== Foreign-language editions ===
- Vendetta – Bulgarian-language release of Vengeance (Kalpazanov Publishing, 2007)

=== Non-fiction ===
- "Screaming In My Ear" – appears in the collection Horror 201: The Silver Scream (Crystal Lake Publishing, 2015)
- "Brian's Holiday Green Lime Salad" – appears in Cooks of Horror (Books of Horror, 2024)

=== Self-published ===
- Killing the Boss (iUniverse, 2000)
- Unreleased (First Publish, 2002)
- The Ruts - cartoon strip collection (Lulu, 2013)

== References and external links ==
- Official website
- Brian Pinkerton's Blog
- Interview with Brian Pinkerton in Literary World (2008)
- Interview with Brian Pinkerton on Macabre Ink (2008)
- Interview with Brian Pinkerton by the Chicago Writers Association (2008)
- The Ruts cartoon series by Brian Pinkerton
