= Bibliography of works on Dracula =

Bibliography of works on Dracula is a listing of non-fiction literary works about the book Dracula or derivative works about its titular vampire Count Dracula.

== Books ==
Full books

- Davison, Carol Margaret (1997). Bram Stoker's Dracula: Sucking Through the Century, 1897-1997. Dundurn. ISBN 9781554881055.
- Florescu, Radu; McNally, Raymond T. (1994). In Search of Dracula: The History of Dracula and Vampires. Houghton Mifflin Harcourt. ISBN 9780395657836.
- Miller, Elizabeth (2005). Bram Stoker's Dracula: A Documentary Volume, Volym 304. Thomson Gale. ISBN 9780787668419.
- Streissguth, Thomas (1999). Legends of Dracula. Twenty-First Century Books. ISBN 9780822549420.
- Madison, Bob (1997). Dracula: The First Hundred Years. Midnight Marquee Press. ISBN 9781887664141.
- Glut, Donald F. (1975). The Dracula book. Scarecrow Press.
- Stoker, Bram; Eighteen-Bisang, Robert; Miller, Elizabeth (2008). Bram Stoker's Notes for Dracula: A Facsimile Edition. McFarland. ISBN 9780786451869.
- Turley Houston, Gail (2005). From Dickens to Dracula: Gothic, Economics, and Victorian Fiction. Volume 48 of Cambridge Studies in Nineteenth-Century Literature and Culture. Cambridge University Press. ISBN 9780521846776.
- Browning, John Edgar; Picart, Caroline Joan (2014). Dracula in Visual Media: Film, Television, Comic Book and Electronic Game Appearances, 1921-2010. McFarland. ISBN 9780786462018.
- Senf, Carol A. (1998). Dracula: Between Tradition and Modernism. Volume 168 of Masterwork Studies Series. Twayne Publishers. ISBN 9780805778441.
- Roza, Greg (2010). Drawing Dracula. Drawing Movie Monsters Step-by-Step. The Rosen Publishing Group, Inc. ISBN 9781615331499.
- Browning, John Edgar; Picart, Caroline Joan S. (2009). Draculas, Vampires, and Other Undead Forms: Essays on Gender, Race and Culture. Scarecrow Press. ISBN 9780810869233.
- Sabatino, Michael (2015). The Legend of Dracula. Famous Legends. Gareth Stevens Publishing. ISBN 9781482427349.
- Dawidziak, Mark (2008). The Bedside, Bathtub & Armchair Companion to Dracula. Bedside, Bathtub & Armchair Companions. University of Michigan, Bloomsbury Academic. ISBN 9780826417947.
- Otfinoski, Steven (2005). Bram Stoker: The Man Who Wrote Dracula. Great Life Stories: Writers and Poets. Franklin Watts. ISBN 9780531167502.
- Hofer, Charles (2005). Meet Dracula. Famous movie monsters. Rosen Publishing Group. ISBN 9781404202672.
- Belford, Barbara (1996). Bram Stoker: A Biography of the Author of Dracula. Knopf. ISBN 978-0679418320.

Chapters

- Wolf, Leonard (1999). "Chapter 22: Count Dracula Woody Allen". Blood Thirst: 100 Years of Vampire Fiction. OUP. ISBN 9780195132502.
- Gordon, Joan; Hollinger, Veronica (1997). "Chapter 2: The Intimacy Dracula Destroyed". Blood Read: The Vampire as Metaphor in Contemporary Culture. University of Pennsylvania Press. ISBN 9780812216288.
- Brodman, Barbara; Doan, James E. (2013). "Chapter 8: Lightening "The White Man's Burden": Evolution of the Vampire from the Victorian Racialism of Dracula to the New World Order of I am Legend". Images of the Modern Vampire: The Hip and the Atavistic. Rowman & Littlefield. pp. 85–99. ISBN 9781611475838.
- Brodman, Barbara; Doan, James E. (2013). "Chapter 2: The Atavistic Vampire from Dracula to The Wisdom of Crocodiles". Images of the Modern Vampire: The Hip and the Atavistic. Rowman & Littlefield. pp. 15–29. ISBN 9781611475838.
- Owen, Ruth (2013). "Chapter 10: The First Dracula". Vampires and Other Bloodsuckers. Not Near Normal: The Paranormal. Bearport Publishing. ISBN 9781617727221.
- Heldreth, Leonard G.; Pharr, Mary (1999). "Chapter 3: Dracula Meets the New Woman". The Blood is the Life: Vampires in Literature. Popular Press. pp. 31–42. ISBN 9780879728038.
- Heldreth, Leonard G.; Pharr, Mary (1999). "Chapter 8: Saberhagens Dracula". The Blood is the Life: Vampires in Literature. Popular Press. pp. 105–120. ISBN 9780879728038.

== Magazines ==
Serialized

- Multiple (1976). "Revenge of Dracula". Revenge of Dracula. Eerie Publications.
- "Dracula". Dracula. 1978.

Single issues

- Timpone, Anthony (1992). "Dracula: The Complete Vampire". Starlog Movie Magazine Presents. Starlog Communications International, Inc. p. 92.
- "Scars of Dracula 1970 Ultimate Guide Magazine". Scars of Dracula 1970 Ultimate Guide Magazine. The Classic Monster of the Movies Collection.
- "Taste the Blood of Dracula 1970 Ultimate Guide Magazine". Taste the Blood of Dracula 1970 Ultimate Guide Magazine. The Classic Monster of the Movies Collection.
- "The Brides of Dracula 1960 Ultimate Guide". The Brides of Dracula 1960 Ultimate Guide. The Classic Monster of the Movies Collection.
- Multiple (December 1992). "Dracula". Premiere Magazine. United States.
- "Christopher Lee in "Scars of Dracula"". Movie News Magazine. Singapore. March 1971.
- "Bram Stoker's Dracula". Fangoria Magazine. Starlog Communications. 1992.

Articles

- "Screen's Noted Horror Man, Plays 'Dracula' Next Week". Pittsburgh Press. June 9, 1943.
- "Stoker's Dracula". Pall Mall Gazette. July 9, 1897. p. 3.

== Essays ==
- Seed, David (1985), The Narrative Method of Dracula, Nineteenth-Century Fiction, vol. 40, University of California Press, pp. 61–75, doi:10.2307/3044836, JSTOR 3044836
- Halberstam, Judith (1993), Technologies of Monstrosity: Bram Stoker's "Dracula", Victorian Studies, vol. 36, Victorian Sexualities, pp. 333–352, JSTOR 3828327
- Khan, Ayla (May 10, 2015), Critical Analysis of Dracula, p. 11 – via SlideShare
- Fassbender, Michael (2011), Literary Analysis: A Summary of Dracula by Bram Stoker

== See also ==
- Bibliography of works on Stephen King
- Bram Stoker Award for Best Non-Fiction
