= Barbara Belford =

American journalist and biographer

- Born: November 23, 1935; Oakland
- Died: June 3, 2010 (aged 74)
- Occupation: Journalist, author, biographer

Barbara Ann Belford (November 23, 1935 – June 3, 2010) was an American journalist and biographer. The second woman to earn tenure at the Columbia University Graduate School of Journalism, she was a prolific journalist and published biographies of Violet Hunt, Bram Stoker, and Oscar Wilde.

Barbara Belford was born on November 23, 1935 in Oakland, California, the daughter of Professor Harold Graef Belford and actress Veronica Burns. She graduated with a BA from Vanderbilt University in 1957 and an MA from the Columbia University Graduate School of Journalism in 1962. She joined Columbia as a professor in 1978. After Phyllis T. Garland, she became the second female professor to earn tenure at the journalism school. She retired in 1996.

Prior to working for Columbia, she worked as a journalist and editor at numerous publications, including the New York Herald Tribune, Quincy Patriot Ledger, St. Petersburg Times, The Scotsman, and Redbook.

Her Brilliant Bylines: A Biographical Anthology of Notable Newspaperwomen in America (1986) is a collection of biographies of 24 female newspaper journalists, critics, and columnists from the 18th and 19th century, from Margaret Fuller to Madeline Blais. She was awarded the 1987 Literature on Media Award from San Francisco State University for the book. Her biography of Violet Hunt chronicled an overlooked literary figure and was bolstered by Belford's discovery of some of Hunt's missing diaries. Her biography of Bram Stoker received mixed reviews, but its section about Stoker's work at the Lyceum Theatre was singled out for praise by multiple critics. It was nominated for the 1996 Bram Stoker Award for Best Non-Fiction. Her biography of Oscar Wilde was noted for its sexual frankness and for Belford's goal of debunking a number of points in Richard Ellman's biography.

== Bibliography ==
- The Young Mothers (nonfiction), Warner Books (New York, NY), 1977.
- Brilliant Bylines: A Biographical Anthology of Notable Newspaperwomen in America, Columbia University Press (New York, NY), 1986.
- Violet: The Story of the Irrepressible Violet Hunt and Her Circle of Lovers and Friends—Ford Madox Ford, Somerset Maugham, H. G. Wells, and Henry James, Simon & Schuster (New York, NY), 1990.
- Bram Stoker: A Biography of the Author of "Dracula," Knopf (New York, NY), 1996.
- Oscar Wilde: A Certain Genius, Random House (New York, NY), 2000.
