= Meet the Hollowheads =

1989 film by Thomas R. Burman

- Theatrical release poster
- Directed by: Thomas R. Burman
- Written by: Thomas R. Burman]]; Lisa Morton
- Produced by: Jonathan de la Luz; John Chavez; Joseph P. Grace
- Starring: John Glover; Nancy Mette; Richard Portnow; Juliette Lewis; Matt Shakman; Joshua John Miller
- Cinematography: Marvin V. Rush
- Edited by: Carl Kress
- Music by: Glenn A. Jordan
- Production company: Linden Productions
- Distributed by: Moviestore Entertainment
- Release dates: October 7, 1989 (Vancouver International Film Festival); November 17, 1989 (United States)
- Running time: 85 minutes
- Country: United States
- Language: English

Meet the Hollowheads is a 1989 American science fiction comedy horror film directed by Thomas R. Burman, written by Burman and Lisa Morton, and starring John Glover, Richard Portnow, Nancy Mette, Juliette Lewis, Matt Shakman, and Joshua John Miller. The film is a black comedy and satire of 1950s sitcoms set in a dystopic future populated by bizarre, tentacled creatures which function dually as household appliances and food.

== Plot ==
The film takes place in a dark world full of pipes, tubes, corridors and a mysterious "edge" that misbehaving children are threatened with being thrown over. The Hollowhead family lives in a brightly lit, surreal home that features unusual appliances and foods.

Henry Hollowhead informs his wife that his new boss Mr. Crabneck will be coming to dinner, and she graciously agrees to make it a memorable one. He hopes to take advantage of this chance at getting a promotion at United Umbilical by impressing his boss over a delicious dinner. Meanwhile, youngest son Billy Hollowhead and his best friend are making a mess in the bedroom with Billy's new splat-spray game, using the family pet's parasites as ammunition. Older sister, budding beauty Cindy Hollowhead is raving about an upcoming party, and her brother Bud is practicing just a little too loudly on his electro-chicken-accordion instrument, which he will be playing at the same party.

Henry and Mr. Crabneck arrive just in time to see the Cindy leaving for the party, and Mr. Crabneck wastes no time in showing his slimey side to both daughter and mother. Dinner begins, with some idle chitchat about work, degrading into a discussion of the dangers of rationalism, and finally coming back to Mr. Hollowhead's desired promotion. At this point, Mr. Crabneck informs them that he is a very lonely man, and the only chance Henry has at getting promoted lies with Miriam, and her willingness to ease his boss's loneliness. Unable to restrain himself further, Mr. Crabneck attacks Miriam while Henry ponders a way to get noticed at work. She fends him off with the help of her well-adjusted son Billy, until Henry joins in and together, the three subdue Mr. Crabneck.

Mr. Crabneck is knocked out and hidden the kitchen just as the police arrive with daughter Cindy. The party has been raided by police after the party-goers tapped into a highly restricted tube, and Cindy was taken into custody under the intoxicating influence of two pounds of softening cream. Oldest son Bud returns after having been booed out of the party because of his new songs, and Mr. Crabneck wakes up once more before finally expiring at the sight of Cindy's drunken state. Instead of throwing the body over the edge, they throw him in the regeneration chamber, revive him, and put him in the basement with Grandpa, who they are secretly keeping alive despite the law.

Problem solved, promotion secured, and pervert safely locked away, the family reminds each other how important family is, because the family that slays together, stays together.

== Cast ==
- John Glover as Henry Hollowhead
- Nancy Mette as Miriam Hollowhead
- Richard Portnow as Mr. Crabneck
- Juliette Lewis as Cindy Hollowhead
- Matt Shakman as Billy Hollowhead
- Joshua John Miller as Joey
- Shnutz Burman as Spike
- Lightfield Lewis as Bud Hollowhead
- Lee Arenberg as Ream Instructor
- Barney Burman as Young Reamer
- Anne Ramsey as Babbleaxe
- Bobcat Goldthwait as Cop #1
- Donovan Scott as Cop #2
- Logan Ramsey as Top Drone
- Layne Britton as Grandpa Hollowhead

== Release ==
Meet the Hollowheads had its world premiere at the Vancouver International Film Festival on October 7, 1989. It screened at the Mill Valley Film Festival on October 11, 1989, before receiving a regional limited theatrical release in Sacramento, California and Seattle, Washington on November 17, 1989. It was released in Los Angeles on December 1, 1989. The film later screened at the Houston International Film Festival on April 23, 1990.

== Reception ==
Kevin Thomas of the Los Angeles Times gave the film a mixed review, writing: "Its cast couldn't be better, yet while the film has wit it has very little that is outright funny. You come away with the impression that Meet the Hollowheads... would be more amusing—and might even mean more—on stage rather than on screen." LA Weekly wrote, "Despite the "tubular" premise, Hollowheads isn't as innovative as the set's decor and rapidly deteriorate into a bland rehashing of the ol' "dinner guest from hell" storyline."
