= Judi Rohrig =

American horror writer and editor

- Born: Indianapolis, Indiana
- Citizenship: US
- Education: Indiana University Bloomington
- Occupation: Author
- Writing career
- Language: English

Judi Rohrig is an American horror writer and editor from Indianapolis, Indiana.

== Biography ==
She attended Indiana University Bloomington where she studied a B.S. in Education and English and graduated in 1978. When not working on writing she has worked in marketing, journalism, and teaching. Rohrig writes horror short stories and non-fiction. She won the Bram Stoker Award in 2005 for editing Hellnotes and a Richard Laymon award in 2001. Rohrig has worked as editor for other magazines and has been published in a number of genre magazines including Crime Time, Cemetery Dance, Extremes 5, Dreaming of Angels, Masques V and Stones. She was postmaster for the Horror Writers Association up to 2006.

== Awards ==
https://www.isfdb.org/cgi-bin/eaw.cgi?11077

Year	Title	Award	Category	Place	Ref
2000	"Still Crazy After All These Years"	Bram Stoker Award	Short Fiction	Longlisted	
2000	—	Bram Stoker Award	The Richard Laymon Award	Won	
2001	"Blind Mouths"	Bram Stoker Award	Short Fiction	Longlisted	
2002	"Stones"	Bram Stoker Award	Anthology	Longlisted	
2003	Hellnotes	Bram Stoker Award	Non-Fiction	Shortlisted	
2004	Hellnotes	Bram Stoker Award	Non-Fiction	Won	

== Bibliography ==
Short fiction

- Still Crazy After All These Years (1999)
- Blind Mouths (2001)
- Elenora's Silver Box (2002)
- A Thousand Words (2006)
- Flesh to Bone (2006)
- Revolution: Number 9 (2007)
- Falls the Shadow (2009)
- Tunes from Limbo, But I Digress (2013)
