= Frank Walls (illustrator) =

American illustrator

- Born: 1973 (age 52–53); San Diego, CA
- Education: BFA in illustration from the Cleveland Institute of Art
- Known for: Fantasy art, Illustration

Frank Walls (born 1973) is an American illustrator and game designer working primarily in the publishing and table-top gaming industry. He was the Creative Director and cartographer of Empty Room Studios Publishing. He has done illustration work for Talisman, Warhammer, Runebound, and many other board and role-playing games. He has also done a number of book covers for Dark Regions Press, Darkfuse Publishing, and Bad Moon Books.

== Works ==
=== Books ===
- The Savage World of Solomon Kane
- Midnight:Hand of Shadow
- Midnight:Honor and Shadow
- Midnight:Destiny and Shadow
- The Ultimate Skill
- Fall of Hades (cover)
- Dweller (cover)
- Gleefully Macabre Tales (cover)
- Wolf Hunt (cover)
- I Will Rise (cover)
- 7 Brains (cover)
- Birdbox (cover)
- Beautiful Hell (cover)
- Ursa Major (cover)
- The Samhanach (cover)

=== Computer games ===
- Restless
- Badge of Blood
- Nosfuratu
- Battle Bombs

=== Board games ===
- StarCraft: The Board Game
- World of Warcraft: The Board Game
- Descent:Altar of Despair
- Descent:Well of Darkness
- Talisman Revised 4th Edition
- Talisman: The Dungeon
- Talisman: The Reaper
- Talisman: The Highlands
- Talisman: The Frostmarch
- Talisman: The City
- Talisman: The Blood Moon
- Runebound: Sands of Al-Kalim
- Runebound: Frozen Wastes

=== Collectible card games ===
- A Game of Thrones: Five Kings Edition
- A Game of Thrones: A Time of Ravens
- Call of Cthulhu: Masks of Nyarlathotep
- The Lord of the Rings: The Card Game
