= Alan Moore: Portrait of an Extraordinary Gentleman =

Tribute to comics creator Alan Moore edited by Gary Spencer Millidge and Smoky Man

- Author: Various
- Subject: Alan Moore
- Publisher: Abiogenesis Press
- Publication date: May 2003
- Pages: 352
- ISBN: 978-0-946790-06-7
- OCLC: 53046985

Alan Moore: Portrait of an Extraordinary Gentleman is a tribute to comics creator Alan Moore edited by Gary Spencer Millidge and Smoky Man and published by Abiogenesis Press in May 2003. Published to raise awareness and funds for charity, its first printing swiftly sold out, with a second, "corrected" published in November of the same year.

It was co-published with Black Velvet Editrice of Italy and raised over $36,000 for Alzheimer's charities.

In January 2007, Abiogenesis Press declared the second printing sold out, with no plans for a further English printing.

== Contents ==
The book contains acknowledgments, academic essays, cartoons and reminiscences by 145 artists and writers.

Notable contributors include Moore's daughters Leah and Amber, and previous Moore-collaborators Bill Sienkiewicz (Big Numbers, Brought to Light), Dave Gibbons and John Higgins (Watchmen), David Lloyd (V for Vendetta), J. H. Williams III (Promethea), José Villarrubia (The Mirror of Love), Kevin O'Neill (The League of Extraordinary Gentlemen), Oscar Zárate (A Small Killing), Rick Veitch and Stephen R. Bissette (Swamp Thing), Jamie Delano (Hellblazer) and Steve Parkhouse (The Bojeffries Saga).

Other contributors and artists include: Adam Hughes, Ashley Wood, Ben Templesmith, Brad Meltzer, Bryan Talbot, Carla Speed McNeil, Dave Sim, Eduardo Risso, Eric Shanower, Gabriele Dell'Otto, Howard Chaykin, Iain Sinclair, Jean-Marc and Randy Lofficier, Jeff Smith, Jim Lee, Jimmy Palmiotti, Len Wein, Mark Buckingham, Mark Millar, Metaphrog, Ferran Brooks, Michael Avon Oeming, Michael Moorcock, Neil Gaiman, Pat Mills, Rich Johnston, Sam Kieth, Sean Phillips, Angus McKie, Steve Niles, Terry Gilliam, Trina Robbins, Walt Simonson and Will Eisner.

A complete list can be found on Millidge's website.

Highlights include:

- A 12-page comics biography (a "biographic") of Moore by Millidge
- A League of Extraordinary Gentlemen drawing by Adam Hughes
- "Hungry is the Heart" (with Dame Darcy)
- An interview with Moore conducted by Omar Martini
- Steve Bissette's reminiscences about his collaborations and fallout with Moore
- "Correspondence: From Hell" (from Cerebus #217-220)

== Awards ==
The book was nominated for the 2003 Bram Stoker Award for Best Non-Fiction.

== Editions ==
- Alan Moore: Portrait of an Extraordinary Gentleman, by Gary Spencer Millidge and Smoky Man (ed.s), 352pp (Abiogenesis, Dec 2003), ISBN 978-0-946790-06-7
