= Ronald Kelly =

American novelist

- Born: November 20, 1959 (age 66); Nashville, Tennessee, U.S.
- Occupations: Writer, novelist
- Writing career
- Period: 1986–96 and 2006–
- Genres: Horror, speculative, western
- Notable works: Undertaker's Moon, Hindsight, Fear, Blood Kin, After the Burn, The Buzzard Zone, "The Essential Sick Stuff", "The Saga of Dead-Eye" series, "Southern-Fried & Horrified" (Memoir).
- Website: ronaldkelly.com

Ronald Kelly (born November 20, 1959) is best known as a speculative fiction and "southern-fried" horror writer. His tales are usually set in the Southern United States and feature language and actions that are associated with those regions.

== Biography ==
Ronald Kelly was born November 20, 1959, in Nashville, Tennessee to Robert Kelly, a blue-collar tool & die worker, and Katherine Earline (Spicer) Kelly, a housewife. He grew up in Nashville, Tennessee until age six, then his family moved to the small rural town of Pegram, Tennessee in 1966. He attended Pegram Elementary School in Pegram, Tennessee and Cheatham County Central High School in Ashland City, Tennessee before starting his writing career. He currently lives in the rural farming community of Brush Creek, Tennessee with his wife, children, and a Jack Russel terrier named Toby.

Ronald Kelly originally had aspirations of becoming a comic book artist and spent most of his high school years writing and drawing his own comic books featuring his own superheroes and characters. He also collaborated with classmate Lowell Cunningham, who later became the creator of the Men In Black comic book series, which spawned several major motion pictures. Kelly began writing fiction during his junior year in high school, concentrating on horror, suspense, and male adventure. Between 1977 and 1985, he wrote several novels in the adventure and western genres that were never published. It was only when he turned back to his first love, horror fiction, that he became successful. He began his professional writing career in 1986 and quickly sold his first short story, "Breakfast Serial," to Terror Time Again magazine. Between 1986 and 1996, Kelly's work was featured in the small press horror magazines of that era, appearing regularly in independently published magazines such as Cemetery Dance, Deathrealm, Noctulpa, and numerous others. His first novel, Hindsight was released by Zebra Books in 1990. His audiobook collection, Dark Dixie: Tales of Southern Horror, was on the nominating ballot of the 1992 Grammy Awards for Best Spoken Word or Non-Musical Album. Zebra published eight of Ronald Kelly's novels from 1990 to 1996. Ronald's short fiction work has been published by Cemetery Dance, Borderlands 3, Deathrealm, Dark at Heart, Hot Blood: Seeds of Fear, and many more. After selling hundreds of thousands of books, the bottom dropped out of the horror market in 1996. When Zebra dropped their horror line in October 1996, Ronald Kelly stopped writing for ten years and worked various jobs including welder, factory worker, production manager, drugstore manager, and custodian. His hesitation to write horror fiction during that time was partly due to his religious convictions; he is a Southern Baptist and born-again Christian.

In 2006, Ronald Kelly started writing again. In early 2008, Croatoan Publishing released his work Flesh Welder as a stand-alone chapbook, and it quickly sold out. In early 2009, Cemetery Dance Publications released a limited edition hardcover of his first short story collection, Midnight Grinding & Other Twilight Terrors. In 2010, Cemetery Dance released his first novel in over fourteen years called, Hell Hollow in hardcover. Full Moon Press had made a deal to release all of Ronald Kelly's previous novels in hardcover format with bonus material and a brand-new added novella in each release. They were calling the series of books The Essential Ronald Kelly, but the deal fell through when Full Moon Press closed its doors. Shortly afterward, Thunderstorm Books published The Essential Ronald Kelly Collection in eight limited edition hardcovers over a three-year period. During that time, Thunderstorm published Kelly regularly, releasing two additional hardcovers, "After the Burn", a post-apocalyptic horror story collection, and "Restless Shadows", the sequel to his first novel, "Hindsight". They also published such story collections as "The Sick Stuff" and "Mister Glow Bones & Other Halloween Tales".

In 2018, Crossroad Press (the publisher of his eBooks and audiobooks) published his Southern-fried zombie novel, The Buzzard Zone in eBook, trade paperback, and audiobook formats. The Buzzard Zone is a tale of apocalyptic horror set in the mountain country of Tennessee and North Carolina. In 2020 and 2021, Silver Shamrock Publishing published a collection of all of his extreme and splatterpunk fiction called The Essential Sick Stuff, Book One of his western-horror series, The Saga of Dead-Eye, and Book One, Haunt of Southern-Fried Fear of his Southern-Fried Horror series. Following the demise of Silver Shamrock, Crossroad Press began publishing and releasing those titles. In 2021, The Essential Sick Stuff won the Splatterpunk Award for Best Collection.

In 2022, Death's Head Press (now Dead Sky Publications) published Kelly's memoir and writing guide, Southern Fried & Horrified, as well as his three-book chapbook series, Somewhere South of Hell.

== Awards and honors ==
- Dark Dixie: Tales of Southern Horror – Was a part of the nominating ballot of the 1992 Grammy Awards for Best Spoken Word or Non-Musical Album
- Flesh Welder – Chosen as the flagship publication for Croatoan Publications
- Chosen as "Horror World's Author of the Month" for April 2008, and they published his short story "Mister Mack & The Monster Mobile" on their website
- "The Final Feature" – Chosen as the flagship story for Mark Seiber's Horror Drive-In fiction section. "The Final Feature on Mark Seiber's Horror Drive-In
- A featured Author Guest at Hypericon 4 in 2008 and is a scheduled featured Author Guest for Hypericon 5 (June 5–7, 2009)
- The Essential Sick Stuff - Winner of the 2021 Splatterpunk Award for Best Collection.
- A featured Author Guest at Scares That Care and AuthorCon in Williamsburg, Virginia.
- Since his career as a horror author has spanned numerous decades, Kelly is often viewed as a horror fiction legend and elder statesman of the horror genre.
- Kelly is one of the few surviving authors from Zebra Book's original horror line from the 1970s,80s, & 90s.

== Select bibliography ==
=== Novels ===
- Hindsight (1990, Zebra Books) ISBN 0-8217-2869-5
- Pitfall (1990, Zebra) ISBN 0-8217-3069-X
- Something Out There (1991, Zebra) ISBN 0-8217-3338-9
- Moon of the Werewolf (1991, Zebra) ISBN 0-8217-3625-6
- Father's Little Helper (1992, Zebra) ISBN 0-8217-3957-3
- The Possession (1993, Zebra) ISBN 0-8217-4368-6
- Fear (1994, Zebra) ISBN 0-8217-4693-6

Reprinted by Pinnacle Books in 2001 under ISBN 0-7860-1357-5

- Blood Kin (1996, Zebra) ISBN 0-8217-5331-2

Reprinted by Pinnacle Books in 2001 under ISBN 0-7860-1413-X

- Hell Hollow (2010, Cemetery Dance Publications) ISBN 978-1-58767-186-9
- Timber Gray (2011, Bad Moon Books) ISBN 978-0-9832211-6-6
- Restless Shadows (2014, Thunderstorm Books)
- The Buzzard Zone (2018, Crossroad Press / 2019, Thunderstorm Books)

==== Slocum novels written as Jake Logan ====
Ronald Kelly contributed two books to the Slocum series of western novels that are collectively published under the pen name "Jake Logan".

- Slocum and the Nightriders (1994, Berkley) – Slocum series number 174
- Slocum and the Gold Slaves (1994, Berkley) – Slocum series number 187

==== The Essential Ronald Kelly series ====
Hardcover series that were originally announced by the now defunct Full Moon Press, but were published with a new publisher, Thunderstorm Books between 2011 and 2013. Each book contained a new novella that included characters from the original novels or are linked to the original novel storyline. The Essentials were published in the following order:

1. Undertaker's Moon (formerly Moon of the Werewolf), plus the novella: The Spawn of Arget Bethir, artwork by Alex McVey (2011)
2. Fear, plus the novella: The Seedling (2011)
3. The Dark'Un (formerly Something Out There), plus the novella: Of Crows & Pale Doves (2012)
4. Hindsight, plus the novella: Potter's Field (2012)
5. Pitfall, plus the novella: Last of the Chupacabra, artwork by Alex McVey
6. Burnt Magnolia (formerly The Possession), plus the novella: The Conflict, artwork by Alex McVey
7. Twelve Gauge (formerly Father's Little Helper), plus the novella: Killing Time
8. Blood Kin, plus the novella: The Wanderer of Twilight Mountain

=== Chapbooks ===
- Flesh Welder (2007, Croatoan Publishing) – 96-page perfect bound signed limited edition chapbook featuring the story "Flesh Welder", an interview with Ronald Kelly, and an excerpt of the novel Undertaker's Moon
- Tanglewood (2008, Cemetery Dance)
- Strong Steps (2016, Thunderstorm Books)
- Somewhere South of Hell, Books 1,2, & 3 (2022, Death's Head Press)

=== Collections ===
- Midnight Grinding and Other Twilight Terrors (2009, Cemetery Dance Publications) ISBN 978-1-58767-182-1 – Limited Edition hardcover (1500 copies) – Features story notes on each short story, an introduction, and an afterword. Stories include:

"Breakfast Serial"
"Miss Abigail's Delicate Condition"
"Forever Angels"
"Yea, Though I Drive"
"The Web of La Sanguinaire"
"The Cistern"
"Papa's Exile"
"The Hatchling"
"Black Harvest"
"Dead Skin"
"Consumption"
"Dust Devils"
"The Boxcar"
"The Dark Tribe"
"Old Hacker"
"The Winds Within"
"Oh, Sordid Shame!"
"The Cerebral Passion"
"Thinning The Herd"
"Blood Suede Shoes"
"Tyrophex-Fourteen"
"Scream Queen"
"Devil's Creek"
"Impressions In Oak"
"Bookmarks"
"Romicide"
"Whorehouse Hollow"
"Depravity Road"
"Beneath Black Bayou"
"Exit 85"
"Grandma's Favorite Recipe"
"Midnight Grinding"

- The Sick Stuff (2009, Thunderstorm Books) – available as a 52-copy limited hardcover and a trade paperback. It was the second book in Thunderstorm Books' Elemental series. It was also released digitally from David Niall Wilson's Macabre Ink Digital. Includes the short stories:

"Diary"
"Mass Appeal"
"The Abduction"
"Pins & Needles"
"Housewarming"
"Old Hacker"
"Mojo Mama"

- Cumberland Furnace & Other Fear-Forged Fables (2011, Bad Moon Books) ISBN 978-0-9832211-7-3 – Features an introduction, and story notes on each short story. Stories include:

"The Cumberland Furnace"
"Grandma's Favorite Recipe"
"The Thing at the Side of the Road"
"Uncle Cyrus"
"Forget Me Not"
"Little Bastard"
"Then Came a Woodsman"
"Diary"
"The Dawning"
"Better Than Breadcrumbs"
"The Abduction"
"Peacemaker"
"Pelingrad's Pit"
"The Final Feature"
"Housewarming"
"The Skating Pond"
"Mister Mack & the Monster Mobile"
"Mojo Mama"
"King Cong"
"Fluid"
"The Peddler's Journey"
"Tanglewood"

- After the Burn (2013, Bad Moon Books) ISBN 978-0-9884478-8-2 – It was originally published in May 2011 by Thunderstorm Books as Volume #8 of the Black Voltage series. - Features an introduction. Stories include:

"A Shiny Can of Whup-Ass"
"Meat is Life"
"The Happiest Place in Hell"
"Popsicle Man"
"Evolution Ridge"
"Taking Care of Business"
"Flesh Welder"
"The Paradise Pill"

- Mister Glow-Bones & Other Halloween Stories- A collection of Halloween-themed short stories and essays published as a limited hardcover by Thunderstorm Press in 2014. The cover illustration was painted by Ronald Kelly. Also available in eBook, paperback, and audiobook.

Stories include: "Introduction" "Mister Glow-Bones" "The Outhouse" "Billy's Mask" "Pins & Needles" "Black Harvest" "Pelingrad's Pit" "Mister Mack & the Monster Mobile" "The Halloween Train" "The Candy in the Ditch Gang" "Halloweens: Past & Present "Monsters in a Box"

- The Halloween Store & Other Tales of All Hallows' Eve- Kelly's second collection of Halloween-themed short stories and essays published by Crossroad Press in 2020.

Stories include: "The Halloween Store" "Mister Mack is Back in Town" "Blood Suede Shoes" "Clown Treats" "The Cistern" "Pretty Little Lanterns" "The Amazing and Totally Awesome Fright Creature" "The Last Halloween: An Essay" "My Top 10 Favorite Halloween Stuff of the '60s and '70s"

- Season's Creepings: Tales of Holiday Horror- A collection of Christmas-themed short stories published by Crossroad Press in 2020.

Stories include: "Introduction" "Jingle Bones" "The Skating Pond" "Depravity Road" "Heirlooms" "The Winds Within" "Then Came a Woodsman" "As for Me, My Little Brain" "Beneath the Branches" "Papa's Exile" "The Peddler's Journey"

- Irish Gothic: Tales of Celtic Horror- A collection of Irish-themed horror short stories.

Stories include: "Introduction" "Flannagan's Bride" "The Wee Village" "Diabhal's Timepiece" "O'Sheehan!" "Postcard from Kilkenny" "A Fine Wake for Nana Ferree" "The Spawn of Arget Bethir" "Irish Celtic Creatures & Cryptids" "Gaelic/English Translation Guide"

- The Web of La Sanguinaire and Other Arachnid Horrors A collection of spider-themed horror short stories and novellas published by D&T Publishing in 2021 and rereleased by Crossroad Press in 2025.

Stories include: "The Web of La Sanguinaire" "The Memory Eater" "Housewarming" "Atomic Arachnid Armageddon!" "Cell Number Nine" "The Creeping Sands" "Hugs and Kisses" "Come See Spider Cave!"

=== Series ===
The Saga of Dead-Eye series.- A horror-western series featuring zombie gunfighter, Dead-Eye, and his traveling companion, Job, a mojo man from Louisiana. This ongoing series is being published in limited hardcover by Thunderstorm Press and in eBook, paperback, and audiobook by Crossroad Press. "Book One: Vampires, Zombies, & Mojo Men" (2021) "Book Two: Werewolves, Swamp Critters, & Hellacious Haints" (2022) "Book Three: Man-Eaters, Mummies, & Murderous Maniacs" (2024) "Book Four: Golems, Ghouls, & Grisly Gargantuans" (2025)

The Southern-Fried Horror series.- Three collections of short stories inspired by the EC Horror Comics of the 1950s, but with a Southern gothic flavor. All three volumes include comic book page artwork by Ronald Kelly and two pages of retro comic book advertisements. "Book One: Haunt of Southern-Fried Fear" (2022, Ghost stories) "Book Two: Tales from the Southern-Fried Crypt" (2023, Louisiana swamp stories) "Book Three: Vault of Southern-Fried Horror" (2024, Mass Murderer and Serial Killer stories)

=== Collaborations ===
The Devil's Backbone: Appalachian Horror- A collection of three novellas by Kelly, Laurel Hightower, and Red Lagoe published as Volume #13 of Crystal Lake Publishing's Dark Tide anthology series. Novellas include: "Afoot in the Netherwild" by Ronald Kelly "Spirit Coven" by Laurel Hightower "The Gatherer" by Red Lagoe

=== Non-Horror Fiction ===
Timber Gray- A traditional western novel published by Bad Moon Books in 2011 and rereleased by Crossroad Press in 2024. The China Doll- A coming-of-age novel set during the Great Depression published by Crossroad Press in 2011.

=== Uncollected short stories ===
The following have not had a physical re-release since their original printings (some have been released digitally):

- "Buella's Pride" (1988, Witness to the Bizarre)
- "Negative Attitude" (1990, The Dark Side)
- "Beneath the Bed" (2012, promotional sheet)

=== Uncollected non-fiction and articles ===
- "Insight on Hindsight" (March 1990, Mystery Scene #25)
- "Writing Something Out There" (Spring 1991, After Hours #10)
- "A Tribute to Ray Rexer" (1991, Overlook Connection #15)
- "Confessions of a Religious Horror Writer" (1991, Gauntlet #2)
- "Subway Graffiti" (1991, After Hours #10)
- "Writing Moon of the Werewolf" (December 1992, Mystery Scene #32)
- "Introduction" for the novel Firefly…Burning Bright by Barry Hoffman (October 1996, Gauntlet Press) ISBN 1-887368-10-8

=== Trade Paperback Reprints ===
Bad Moon Books reprinted the following Ronald Kelly titles as mass market trade paperbacks: After the Burn Timber Gray Cumberland Furnace & Other Fear-Forged Fables

Sinister Grin Press reprinted the following Ronald Kelly titles as mass market trade paperbacks: Undertaker's Moon Fear Hell Hollow

=== Audiobooks ===
- Dark Dixie: Tales of Southern Horror (1991, Spine Tingling Press) – 90-minute audio collection on cassette. Narrated by Reg Green. Contains an introduction and the following short stories with 3-D sound effects:

"The Cistern"
"Miss Abigail's Delicate Condition"
"Papa's Exile"
"Black Harvest"
"Yea, Though I Drive"

- Undertaker's Moon – excerpts (Croatoan Publishing, 2008) – Audio CD narrated by Wayne June (commissioned promotional-only CD by Croatoan Publishing)

Unhinged: Short Story collection narrated by Milton Bagby. (Audible, 2013)
Hindsight narrated by Jennifer Nittoso
Restless Shadows narrated by Jennifer Nittoso
Fear narrated by J. Rodney Turner
Undertaker's Moon narrated by J. Rodney Turner
Hell Hollow narrated by J. Rodney Turner
Pitfall narrated by J. Rodney Turner
Twelve Gauge narrated by Hayden Hunt
The Dark'Un narrated by Joe Geoffrey
Blood Kin narrated by Gary Noon
The China Doll narrated by Pam Dougherty
The Saga of Dead-Eye: Books 1,2,3, and 4 narrated by J. Rodney Turner

=== Digital e-book releases ===
David Niall Wilson's Macabre Ink Digital/Crossroad Press has released digital editions (PDF, Kindle, etc.) of the following:

- Flesh Welder – same as physical release
- The Sick Stuff – same as physical release
- Dark Dixie: Tales of Southern Horror – featuring the same tales that are in the audio book plus a new Introduction by Ronald Kelly, "Uncle Cyrus," "The Hatchling," and "Forever Angels."
- Cumberland Furnace & Other Fear Forged Fables – featuring:

Introduction
"Cumberland Furnace"
"The Final Feature"
"Tanglewood"
"The Peddler's Journey"
"The Thing at the Side of the Road"
"Grandma's Favorite Recipe"
"Mister Mack & the Monster Mobile"

- Timber Gray – a brand new Western genre novel
- The Dark'un - same as physical release
- Hell Hollow - same as physical release
- Undertaker's Moon same as physical release
