= Strangehaven =

Self-published comic book series by Gary Spencer Millidge

- Cover of Strangehaven Volume 1 By Gary Spencer Millidge.

Publication information
- Publisher: Abiogenesis Press
- Schedule: Irregular
- Format: Ongoing series
- Publication date: 1995–2023
- No. of issues: 18
- Main character(s): Alex Hunter and others

Creative team
- Created by: Gary Spencer Millidge
- Written by: Gary Spencer Millidge
- Artist: Gary Spencer Millidge

Collected editions
- Arcadia: ISBN 0-946790-04-3
- Brotherhood: ISBN 0-946790-05-1
- Conspiracies: ISBN 0-946790-07-8

Strangehaven was a self-published comic book series created by Gary Spencer Millidge. It was not published on a regular schedule, and the series went on hiatus from 2005 to 2014. From 2014 to 2023, new Strangehaven chapters were published in Meanwhile..., an anthology comic published by Soaring Penguin Press.

In September 2021, Millidge announced that Strangehaven had been optioned for film and TV by IDW Entertainment.

== Plot ==
At the beginning of the first of issue, Alex Hunter almost runs over a woman while driving through the British countryside, swerving and crashing his car into a tree. He wakes to find himself in the picturesque village of Strangehaven, where a young woman named Janey Jones convinces him to stay. He finds a spacious cottage to rent and a job as a teacher at the local school, but it soon becomes clear that something is awry in Strangehaven. A secretive cult calling themselves The Knights of the Golden Light have taken over all positions of authority; a pagan coven is plotting something out in the woodlands; the woman Alex saw in the road seems to be haunting his dreams; and no matter how far he drives, the village itself will not seem to let him leave.

While Strangehaven appears to be nothing more than another small Devonshire village, it is clear from the earliest issues that something is not quite right. A number of characters have unusual quirks or gifts, such as the mechanic, Alberto, who is able to restore any car to pristine condition, no matter how badly it is damaged; also Adam, who claims to be an alien with X-ray vision; and Elsie, an old woman who is depicted as being able to communicate with animals. There are a disproportionately high number of twins in the village, including the village doctor and his alcoholic brother, and Janey and Jeremy Jones, who were born on either side of midnight.

The village motives of The Knights of the Golden Light, whose members include all high-ranking villagers, are unclear. However, it is not until issue four that something explicitly supernatural happens, when Megaron, a half-Amazonian shaman, teaches Jeremy to see through a bird's eyes. Supernatural elements are hinted at in earlier issues, most notably in the way that Alex is unable to leave the village without the road seemingly curving back into Strangehaven, and in the visions Alex has of The Woman on the Road, whose physical form also seems to be kept in a fishtank in the house of an unseen villager.

Although Alex is unable to leave Strangehaven, it is implied that this is unusual, and few of the villagers have expressed any knowledge of this phenomenon. Suzie Tang leaves the village in one issue to return to Hong Kong, and Billy Bates also flees Strangehaven, so one can assume that some are able to travel outside it. Communication with the outside world is also possible, as Alex is able to press for divorce with his estranged wife through the village solicitor. In issue seven, Alex meets Surfer Steve, who claims that Strangehaven is conscious and only allows people to leave if "she" wants them to.

In issue 17, Alex is informed by a coven of witches (including Megaron) that Strangehaven is the point to which all of the ley lines and other religious and magically significant monuments point, and is in effect a template for the entire planet. It emerges that the Knights are plotting to take control of Strangehaven's soul and thus control the planet itself.

== Influences ==
Millidge cited the television series The Prisoner and Twin Peaks as inspirations for Strangehaven. Like the protagonist of The Prisoner, Alex Hunter is trapped in a picturesque, apparently British village from which there is no escape. In Strangehaven's case, he is not pursued by any kind of security device; rather, any attempt by him to leave results in the geography of the outlying area warping to deposit him back in the village, as if he had somehow driven in a circle. In one issue, a man in the local post office also uses the phrase "be seeing you", which was a catchphrase of that show.

The influences of Twin Peaks are also evident; it, too, was about a stranger entering a small community plagued by supernatural strangeness, and interacting with a number of quirky and sometimes supernatural locals. Like those living in Twin Peaks, a number of the village's residents are members of opposing lodges — in this case the Knights and the Coven — and like Twin Peaks, its protagonist is extremely enthusiastic about the small community, despite its unusual aspects. One scene in which Elsie claims that her dogs told her who buried some bloody clothing mirrors a scene in Twin Peaks in which the Log Lady claims that her log witnessed some strange goings-on. The series also follows a soap-operatic style much like Twin Peaks, in which the supernatural is offset by more mundane story elements such as infidelity, young love, and murder.

Millidge also took inspiration from The Darling Buds of May, a TV series about peaceful countryside life, and The Avengers, a '60s spy show that often featured quaint English villages run by diabolical masterminds.

== Art style ==
Millidge's art was primarily photo-referenced and extremely realistic. For the first 18 issues, it was also entirely in black and white, with the exception of the painted covers. For the first half of the run, the majority of the art was done in basic inks, and the progression can be seen of Millidge's art from simple linework in issue one to the more complex crosshatching and computer-aided shading in later issues. From issue 13 onwards, Millidge's art changed completely to resemble an entirely painted look, with thicker black outlines around characters and more subtle shading. Since resuming in the anthology, Meanwhile, Millidge has provided full-colour artwork.

The art in Strangehaven was not always consistent from issue to issue; from the very first issue, Mllidge inserted photographs, pencil drawings and painted art into the story, typically to illustrate stories being told by the characters, such as Megaron's tales of Amazonian mythology, or Mrs McCreadie's recollections of World War II.

Issue #19 was planned to be a "new format" issue, although the details of this new format, and whether it would involve further changes in the comic's art, were not announced.

== Publication history ==
Due to conflicts within his personal life and comics career, Millidge was never able to regularly publish Strangehaven. For the first four years of its life, Millidge managed to produce one issue every six or seven months, but from 1999 until the end of its run as a standalone comic, the book came out roughly once per year (with a notable 20-month gap between issues 12 and 13) while Millidge dealt with personal issues. In 2005, with the publication of issue 18, Strangehaven went on an indefinite hiatus. From then until the return of Strangehaven in Meanwhile..., Millidge concentrated on paid, non-Strangehaven work.

During this time, Millidge considered the book to still be active and planned "some kind of closure" by issue 24, which would also mark the end of the fourth trade paperback, Destiny. In September 2007, he said on his blog that a publication date for issue 19 would only be announced when he was certain that he could meet it. This, however, never came to fruition.

From 2014 to 2023, new Strangehaven chapters were published in Meanwhile..., an anthology comic published by Soaring Penguin Press. These new chapters, each 14 pages long, are considered to be half an episode in length, and are in full colour.

== Collected editions ==
As of 2023, three Strangehaven trade paperbacks have been released. All three feature an introduction by a famous comic book creator and a biography of Gary Spencer Millidge. The first and second include bibliographies detailing all of the books that Millidge has used as references for the series. The first also includes a glossary of terms used in the Devonshire dialect. Millidge has announced plans to release a fourth collected edition which in will include all of the chapters published in Meanwhile....

- Arcadia (collects #1-6, foreword by Dave Sim, 2001 ISBN 0-946790-04-3)
- Brotherhood (collects #7-12, foreword by Bryan Talbot, 2001 ISBN 0-946790-05-1)
- Conspiracies (collects #13-18, foreword by Dave Gibbons, 2005 ISBN 0-946790-07-8)

== Awards ==
Year	Result	Category	Award Show
1997	Won	National Comics Awards	Best Self-Published/Independent Comic
1997	Nominated	Ignatz Awards	Outstanding Series
1997	Nominated	Eisner Awards	Best Continuing Series
1997	Nominated	Eisner Awards	Talent Deserving of Wider Recognition (Gary Spencer Millidge)
1999	Nominated	Eagle Awards	Favourite UK Non-Newsstand Title
1999	Nominated	National Comics Awards	Best New Comic (British)
2002	Nominated	National Comics Awards	Best Self-Published/Independent
2003	Nominated	Ignatz Awards	Outstanding Series
2004	Nominated	Eagle Awards	Favourite British Small Press Title

== See also ==
- British small press comics
- History of the British comic

== Notes ==
- Strangehaven at the Comic Book DB (archived from the original)
