= Gary Spencer Millidge =

British comic book creator

- Born: 1961 (age 64–65)
- Areas: Writer, Penciller, Inker, Letterer
- Notable works: Strangehaven
- Awards: "Best Self-Published/Independent Comic" National Comics Award (1997)

Gary Spencer Millidge (born 1961) is a British comic book creator best known for his series Strangehaven. He has also written and contributed to books about comics.

== Biography ==
Millidge was born in Hackney, London, where he attended Southend School of Art: in this period he published the small-press comic Amon*Spek with other fellow students. After having completed his studies, he opened in Southend the comics shop Collectors' Dream .

In 1995 Millidge began his Strangehaven series and in the same month published a short Strangehaven story in the comics anthology Negative Burn.

Strangehaven ran for ten years from 1995 to 2005. In 2014, Millidge returned to the series as part of Soaring Penguin Press‘s anthology magazine Meanwhile. In 2024, he announced the final chapter, Strangehaven: Epilogue. According to a post from his blog from December 2025, it is still under "gradual, but relentless progress."

Millidge also writes about comics, editing Alan Moore: Portrait of an Extraordinary Gentleman and Alan Moore: Storyteller as well as writing Comic Book Design.

== Bibliography ==
=== Comics ===
Comics work includes:

- Strangehaven #1- (script and art, Abiogenesis Press, 1995-) collected as:
  - Arcadia (collects #1-6, foreword by Dave Sim, 2001 ISBN 0-946790-04-3)
  - Brotherhood (collects #7-12, foreword by Bryan Talbot, 2001 ISBN 0-946790-05-1)
  - Conspiracies (collects #13-18, foreword by Dave Gibbons, 2005 ISBN 0-946790-07-8)
- "Strangehaven: Custard Creams" (script and art, in Negative Burn #24, Caliber Comics, 1995)
- "From Hell and Back" (script and art, in Bart Simpson's Treehouse of Horror #9, Bongo Comics, 2003)

=== Non-fiction ===
- Alan Moore: Portrait of an Extraordinary Gentleman (edited by Gary Spencer Millidge and Smoky Man, 352 pages, Abiogenesis, December 2003, ISBN 0-946790-06-X)
- Comic Book Design: The Essential Guide to Creating Great Comics and Graphic Novels (160 pages, Random House, July 2009, ISBN 0-8230-9796-X)
- Alan Moore: Storyteller (336 pages, ILEX, August 2011, ISBN 1-907579-12-5)

=== Drawing manuals ===
- Draw Fantasy Figures (New Holland, 2006)
- Draw Dragons and Other Fantasy Beasts (New Holland, 2007)

== Awards ==
As well as numerous nominations, including one for the 1997 "Talent Deserving of Wider Recognition" Eisner Award, he won the 1997 "Best Self-Published/Independent Comic" National Comics Award for Strangehaven.

Alan Moore: Portrait of an Extraordinary Gentleman was also nominated for the 2003 Bram Stoker Award for Best Non-Fiction.
