= John R. Little =

Canadian author

- Born: John R. Little; August 16, 1955 (age 71); London, Ontario, Canada
- Occupations: Writer, Computer application designer
- Writing career
- Period: 1982–
- Genres: Horror fiction, Fantasy
- Website: www.johnrlittle.com

John R. Little is best known as a writer of horror and dark fantasy fiction. He was born in London, Ontario, Canada on August 16, 1955, and he currently resides in Ayr, ON Canada. John R. Little has an Honours Bachelor of Science degree from the University of Western Ontario where his major was Computer Science and he minored in Math. He has been publishing fiction since 1982 with his work "Volunteers Needed" published in the February, 1982 issue of Cavalier magazine. John R. Little's short story "Tommy's Christmas," first published in Twilight Zone Magazine in 1983, was chosen by Isaac Asimov, Terry Carr, and Martin Greenberg to appear in their 1984 anthology 100 Great Fantasy Short Short Stories. "Tommy's Christmas" has since been published in many different countries and languages. John R. Little continues to currently write novels, novellas, and short stories. His recent work has received many award nominations including the Black Quill and Bram Stoker Award.

== Awards and honors ==
- 2007 Bram Stoker Award nomination "Superior Achievement in a First Novel" - The Memory Tree
- 1st Annual Black Quill Award nomination "Best Small Press Chill" - Placeholders
- 2nd Annual Black Quill Award winner "Best Small Press Chill" - Miranda
- 2008 Bram Stoker Award winner "Superior Achievement in Long Fiction" - Miranda
- 2009 President's Richard Laymon Award for volunteer work on behalf of the Horror Writers Association

== Selected bibliography ==
- The Memory Tree (Nocturne Press, 2007)
- Placeholders (Necessary Evil Press, 2007)
- Climbing Mount Turnpike (Nocturne Press, 2007)
- Miranda (AKA adnariM) (Bad Moon Books, 2008) - Lettered versions included the short story "Hunting for Miranda"
- Dreams in Black and White (Bloodletting Press, 2009)
- The Gray Zone (Bad Moon Books 2009)
- Little Things A collection of short stories. (Bad Moon Books, in 2010)

=== Short stories ===
- "Volunteers Needed" - Cavalier magazine (February, 1982)
- "Tommy's Christmas" - Twilight Zone magazine (February, 1983) - Reprinted in Italian as "Il Natale di Tommy" in the 1988 Un Fantastico Natale anthology, reprinted in German as "Tommy's Weihnacten" in the 1988 anthology Das Große Weihnachts-Buch der Phantasie
- "Growing Up" - Weird Tales magazine (Summer, 1991)
- "Daddy" - Tales From the Gorezone anthology edited by Kealan Patrick Burke (Apt 42 Publications, 2004).
- "Those Little Cameras!" - Dark Discoveries magazine #4 (April, 2005)
- "Ever After" - Shivers IV anthology edited by Richard Chizmar (Cemetery Dance Publications, 2006).
- "Accordion Season" - Doorways magazine (July, 2008)
- "Following Marla," a short story published in "Horror World", February, 2009
- "George’s Head," a short story in Legends of the Mountain State #3, edited by Michael Knost
- "Hunting for Miranda," a short story published in the lettered edition of Miranda, June, 2009
- "A Slow Haunting," a short story Dark Delicacies III, 2009
