= Bad Moon Books =

American publishing company

- Type: Publishing
- Industry: Books, Publishing
- Founded: 1992
- Founder: Roy K. Robbins
- Headquarters: Garden Grove, California, USA
- Products: Books
- Website: www.badmoonbooks.com

Bad Moon Books is a publishing company owned by Roy K. Robbins in Garden Grove, California. In the middle of 1986, they began as a bookseller only, but in 2007 they began publishing. Their works include many Black Quill Award and Bram Stoker Award winners and nominees. Bad Moon Books' publications include limited edition paperbacks and hardcovers (including lettered editions, signed limited editions, and the occasional trade edition).

Recently, internationally known bestselling author Clive Barker chose Bad Moon Books to publish his never before published 1974 book, The Adventures of Mr. Maximillian Bacchus and His Travelling Circus which came out in April 2009.

== Awards and honors ==
- 2009 Bram Stoker Award Winner "Superior Achievement in Long Fiction" for The Lucid Dreaming by Lisa Morton
- 2009 Bram Stoker Award nomination "Superior Achievement in Long Fiction" for The Hunger of Empty Vessels by Scott Edelman
- 2009 Bram Stoker Award nomination "Superior Achievement in Long Fiction" for Doc Good's Traveling Show by Gene O'Neill
- 2009 Black Quill Award for "Best Small Press Chill: Readers' Choice" for As Fate Would Have It by Michael Louis Calvillo
- 2009 Black Quill Award for "Best Cover Art and Design: Editors' Choice and Reader's Choice" for As Fate Would Have It by Michael Louis Calvillo(Artwork: Peter Mahaichuk; Cover Design: César Puch)
- 2008 Bram Stoker Award Winner "Superior Achievement in Long Fiction" for Miranda by John R. Little
- 2008 Bram Stoker Award nomination "Superior Achievement in Long Fiction" for The Confessions of St. Zach by Gene O'Neill
- 2008 Bram Stoker Award nomination "Superior Achievement in a Novel" for Johnny Gruesome by Greg Lamberson.
- 2008 Black Quill Award for Best Small Press Chill Editors' Choice for Miranda by John R. Little
- 2008 Black Quill Award for Best Small Press Chill Readers' Choice for Johnny Gruesome by Gregory Lamberson
- 2008 Black Quill Award nomination for Best Small Press Chill for The Confessions of St. Zach by Gene O'Neill
- Brian Keene's list of top 10 books of 2007 - Restore From Backup by J.F. Gonzalez & Mike Oliveri

== Publications ==
=== Novels ===
- Johnny Gruesome by Greg Lamberson (2007): Published as a 26-copy leather-bound lettered hardcover and 250-copy limited hardcover.
  - Introduction by Jeff Strand. Cover art by Zach McCain.
- As Fate Would Have It (A Prolonged Love Letter) by Michael Louis Calvillo (March 2009): Published as a 26-copy leather-bound lettered hardcover and 150-copy limited hardcover.
  - Introduction by John R. Little. Afterword by Lisa Morton. Cover art by Peter Mihaichuk.
- The Adventures of Mr. Maximillian Bacchus and His Travelling Circus by Clive Barker (May 2009): Published as an ultra edition of 10 handmade hardcovers, traycased lettered edition of 26 lettered copies, slipcased limited edition of 300 numbered copies, and a trade edition of 1500 hardcover copies
  - Illustrated by Richard A. Kirk.
- Black & Orange by Benjamin Kane Ethridge (2010 in literature):Published as a 67 copy limited hardcover.
  - Cover art by Zach McCain.
- Rough Cut by Brian Pinkerton (2011 in literature): Published as a 75 copy limited hardcover.
  - Cover art by John Everson.
- Maelstoem by David Niall Wilson (2011 in literature): Published as a 41 copy limited hardcover.
  - Cover art by Alex McVey

=== Eclipse Series ===
- Book 1 - The Not Quite Right Reverend Cletus J. Diggs & the Currently Accepted Habits of Nature by David Niall Wilson (November 2008): Published as a 26-copy leather-bound hardcover - 100-copy limited hardcover - 10 Loyalty Editions
  - Introduction by Elizabeth Massie. Cover art by Zach McCain.
- Book 2 - Little Graveyard on the Prairie by Steven E. Wedel (February 2009): Published as a 26-copy leather-bound hardcover and 100-copy limited hardcover.
  - Introduction by Steve Vernon. Cover art by Paul Groendes.
- Book 3 - Lost Tribe by Gene O'Neill (February 2009): Published as a 26-copy leather-bound hardcover and 100-copy limited hardcover.
  - Cover art by Zach McCain.
- Book 4 - Shadow of the Dark Angel by Gene O'Neill (August 2009): Published as a 26-copy leather-bound hardcover and 100-copy limited hardcover.
  - Cover art by John Pierro.
- Book 5 - Crimson by Gord Rollo (February 2010): Published as a 26-copy leather-bound hardcover and 100-copy limited hardcover.
  - Cover art by Zach McCain.
- Book 6 - Vintage Soul by David Niall Wilson (April 2010): Published as a single copy ultra edition, 26-copy leather-bound hardcover, and 100-copy limited hardcover.
  - Cover art by Don Paresi.
- Book 7 - Sparrow Rock by Nate Kenyon (2010 in literature): Published as a 100-copy limited hardcover.
  - Cover art by Zach McCain.
- Book 8 - Siren by John Everson (2010 in literature): Published as a 100-copy limited hardcover.
  - Cover art by Anthony Soumis
- Book 9 - The Dead Parade by James Roy Daley (2010 in literature): Published as a 100-copy limited hardcover.
  - Foreword by David Dunwoody. Cover art by Eerie Von.
- Book 10 - Deathflash by Gene O'Neill (2011 in literature): Published as a 100-copy limited hardcover.
  - Cover art by Steven Gilbert.
- Book 11 - A View From The Lake by Greg Gifune (2011 in literature): Published as a 100-copy limited hardcover and a trade paperback.
  - Introduction by T.M. Wright. Cover art by Erin Wells.
- Book 12 - Not Fade Away by Gene O'Neill (2011 in literature): Published as a 100-copy limited hardcover.
  - Cover art by Steven Gilbert.

=== Novellas ===
- Alice on the Shelf by Bill Gauthier (2011): Published as a trade paperback
  - Cover art by Frank Walls.
- The Samhanach by Lisa Morton (2010): Published as a trade paperback
  - Cover art by Frank Walls.
- Jade by Gene O'Neill (2010): Published as a 26-copy leather-bound hardcover and 150-copy limited softcover.
  - Introduction by Michael McBride and illustrated by Steve Gilberts.
- Blood Spring by Erik Williams: Published as a trade paperback.
  - Cover art by Jill Bauman.
- Monster Town / The Butcher of Box Hill by Logan Savile (a pseudonym for Steven Savile and Brian M. Logan): Published as a 100-copy limited hardcover tête-bêche bound double novella.
  - Illustrated by Darryl Elliott.
- Lord of the Lash and Our Lady of the Boogaloo (Vampire Outlaw Part II) by Weston Ochse (2009): Published as a 26-copy leather-bound hardcover and 200-copy limited softcover.
  - Cover art by Zach McCain.
- The Day Before by John Skipp and Cody Goodfellow: Published as a 300-copy trade paperback.
  - Cover art by Cody Goodfellow.
- The Watching by Paul Melniczek (2009): Published as a 26-copy leather-bound hardcover and 150-copy limited softcover.
  - Cover art by Jill Bauman.
- This Ghosting Tide by Simon Clark (2009): Published as a 26-copy leather-bound hardcover and 300-copy limited softcover.
  - Cover art by Zach McCain.
- The Lucid Dreaming by Lisa Morton (2009): Published as a 26-copy leather-bound hardcover and 150-copy limited softcover.
  - Cover art by Zach McCain.
- Doc Good's Travelling Show by Gene O'Neill (2009): Published as a 26-copy leather-bound hardcover and 200-copy limited softcover.
  - Illustrated by GAK.
- Necropolis by John Urbancik (2009): Published as a 26-copy leather-bound hardcover and 100-copy limited softcover.
  - Featuring photography by John Urbancik.
- The Better Year by Bridget Morrow (2009): Published as a 26-copy leather-bound hardcover and 100-copy limited softcover.
  - Cover art by Erin Wells.
- The Hunger of Empty Vessels by Scott Edelman (2009): Published as a 26-copy leather-bound hardcover and 150-copy limited softcover.
  - Introduction by Gene O'Neill. Cover art by Dominic Harman.
- The Gray Zone by John R. Little (2009): Published as a 26-copy leather-bound hardcover and 100-copy limited softcover.
  - Cover art and inner illustrations by Alan M. Clark.
- Miranda (AKA adnariM) by John R. Little (October 2008): Published as a 26-copy leather-bound hardcover, 250-copy limited softcover, and a trade paperback.
  - Introduction by Gary A. Braunbeck. Cover art by Alan M. Clark.
- The Confessions of St. Zach by Gene O'Neill (2008): Published as a 26-copy leather-bound hardcover and 200-copy limited softcover.
  - Introduction by Gord Rollo. Afterword by Brian Keene. Cover art by Steve Gilberts.
- The Bitchfight by Michael Arnzen (2008): Published as a 26-copy leather-bound hardcover and 200-copy limited softcover.
  - Introduction by Brian Hodge. Cover art by Caroline O'Neal.
- The Scrubs by Simon Janus (AKA Simon Wood) (July 2008): Published as a 26-copy leather-bound hardcover and 200-copy limited softcover.
  - Introduction by Weston Ochse. Cover art by Alan M. Clark.
- Plague Monkey Spam by Steve Vernon (2008): Published as a 26-copy leather-bound hardcover and 200-copy limited softcover chapbook.
  - Introduction by Tim Waggoner. Cover art by Alan M. Clark.
- Restore From Backup by J. F. Gonzalez & Mike Oliveri (2007): Published as a 26-copy leather-bound hardcover and 300-copy limited softcover.
  - Cover art by John Everson.
- You In? by Kealan Patrick Burke (2007): Published as a 26-copy leather-bound hardcover and 300-copy limited softcover.
  - Cover art by Steve Gilberts.
- Vampire Outlaw of the Milky Way by Wes Ochse (2007): Published as a 26-copy leather-bound hardcover and 300-copy limited softcover.
  - Introduction by Brian Keene. Cover art by Chad Savage.
- Wings of the Butterfly by John Urbancik (2007): Published as a 26-copy leather-bound hardcover and 300-copy limited softcover.
  - Introduction by Weston Ochse.
- House of Shadow and Ash by John Urbancik (2007): Published as a 150-copy limited softcover.
  - Cover art by John Pierro.

=== Promo chapbooks ===
- Heart of Glass by David Winnick (2011). Promo chapbook for World Horror Con in Austin Texas.
- Bad Candy by Al Sarrantonio and Paul Melniczek (2009). Promo chapbook that came with the purchase of the signed limited edition of The Watching by Paul Melniczek. Featuring the short stories "Pumpkin Head," "Softly the Night Whispers," and "The Fabric of Memories."
  - Cover art by Michael Cypher.
- A Pair of Little Things by John R. Little (2009). Promo chapbook featuring the short stories "Climbing Mount Turnpike" and "Ever After."
  - Cover art by Alex McVey.

=== Collections ===
- Blood & Gristle by Michael Louis Calvillo(2010): A short story collection published as a trade paperback.
  - Cover art by Daniele Serra
- 51 Fiendish Ways to Leave Your Lover by Lisa Mannetti (2010): A dark humor book, heavily illustrated with cartoons published as a trade paperback.
  - Cover art and illustrations by Glenn Chadbourne
- Dark Matter by Bruce Boston (2010): A collection of Poems published as a trade paperback.
  - Cover art by Daniele Serra.
- Little Things by John R. Little(2010 in literature): A short story collection published as a trade paperback.
  - Introduction by Mort Castle. Cover art by Alex McVey.
- Cumberland Furnace & other Fear-Forged Fables by Ronald Kelly (2011): A short story collection published as a trade paperback.
  - Cover art by Zach McCain.
- Monsters of L.A. by Lisa Morton (2011): A short story collection published as a trade paperback.
  - Cover photo by Lisa Morton.

== External links and references ==
- Bad Moon Books homepage
