= Dark Discoveries =

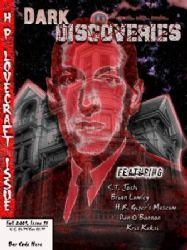
- Editor-in-Chief: James R. Beach, Aaron J. French
- Former editors: Jason V Brock (Managing Editor, Art Director, Contributor, 2008-2012)
- Categories: Dark Fantasy
- Frequency: Quarterly
- Publisher: Journalstone Publishing
- Founded: 2004
- Company: Journalstone Publishing
- Country: United States
- Based in: San Mateo, California (Current)
- Language: English
- Website: www.darkdiscoveries.com

Dark Discoveries is an internationally distributed, quarterly slick magazine formerly published by Dark Discoveries Publications, and now published by Journalstone, LLC. It focuses primarily on the horror fiction, dark fantasy, and science fiction genres. The magazine's content includes short fiction, interviews, nonfiction articles, profiles of industry notables, and is fully illustrated.

Dark Discoveries was founded in January, 2004 by James R. Beach of Longview, WA. The magazine began as a black and white periodical with David Emrich, of David Emrich Design, doing the layout and art direction from 2004 to 2007. Together Editor-in-chief Beach and designer Emrich created the basic look and feel of the magazine that continued through the first ten issues. Designer Cesar Puch briefly took over the layout for two issues in 2008, but left for a job with Bad Moon Books after that.

Dark Discoveries then became a color publication in 2009 after Jason V Brock became Managing Editor, Graphic Designer (via JaSunni Productions, LLC, who also maintained the Dark Discoveries website) and Art Director in 2008, helping to salvage the magazine from being discontinued by publisher Beach. Among many novel ideas and new perspectives introduced by Brock (editorially, visually, and content-wise) was the concept of having each issue follow a topic to unify its thrust, a more graphically compelling look, and a renewed focus on media outside of the small press, namely film, television, and the art world. Brock left the magazine and the website in mid-2012; his last full issue was #19, which focused on extreme horror, though some of his ideas for topics were utilized into 2013, and he was credited as Art Director for issue #20, as the magazine was transitioned to new staff following Brock's departure to become Editor-in-Chief of the biannual horror literary publication Nameless Digest, published by Cycatrix Press.

Dark Discoveries, both the magazine and name, were purchased by JournalStone, LLC. Owner/President Christopher C. Payne in August, 2012. The page count was expanded, the format changed to a perfect-bound magazine, and color was added to all of the pages, the page count was increased, and the format enlarged (all concepts Brock had predicted would be needed to continue the magazine). The current staff is led by Editor-in-Chief James R. Beach, Managing Editor Aaron J. French, Designer/Art Director Cyrus Wraith Walker, Assistant Editors Chuck Caruso, and Elizabeth Reuter, and Submissions Editor Lacey Friedly. Regular contributors and columnists include: Joel B. Kirkpatrick, Dr. Michael R. Collins, Yvonne Navarro, Robert Morrish, and Amy Shane.
