= Layne Britton =

American makeup artist and stuntman (1907-1993)

- Born: William Tom Layne Britton; September 5, 1907; Munday, Texas, U.S.
- Died: December 12, 1993 (aged 86); Marina del Rey, California, U.S.
- Occupations: Make-up artist and film actor
- Spouse: Leila Sackett (m. 1952)

Layne "Shotgun" Britton (September 5, 1907 – December 12, 1993) was a makeup artist and actor in Hollywood from 1939 until 1989. He worked with many notable actors and musicians, such as Frank Sinatra, Bob Hope, John Belushi, John Candy and Jane Russell. He had an extensive career in feature films and television, and a short career as an actor.

== Career ==
In 1944, Britton appeared on the radio quiz program Blind Date. The broadcast was photographed for Life magazine by Gjon Mili.

Britton appeared as a contestant on the January 13, 1955 episode of the television quiz program You Bet Your Life, hosted by Groucho Marx.

Britton served as a makeup artist in the 1980 film The Blues Brothers, but also appeared briefly in the film. Characters Elwood (Dan Aykroyd) and Jake (John Belushi) enter Elwood's SRO, and Britton, depicted as an old man playing cards in the lobby, yells, "Did you get me my Cheez Whiz, boy?" Elwood then pulls a can of Snack Mate from his pocket and tosses it to Britton.

Britton died in Marina del Rey, California, at the age of 86. He is buried in the Inglewood Park Cemetery in Los Angeles, California.

== Filmography ==
Year	Title	Role	Notes
1980	The Blues Brothers	The Cheese Whiz	
1981	Soggy Bottom, U.S.A.	Storekeeper	
1989	Meet the Hollowheads	Grandpa Hollowhead	(final film role)
