= Kim Paffenroth =

American religious scholar, professor, and contemporary American horror author

Kim Paffenroth (born 1966) is an American religious scholar, professor, and contemporary American horror author, best known for his Bram Stoker Award-winning book Gospel of the Living Dead: George Romero’s Visions of Hell on Earth.

== Biography ==
Kim Paffenroth was born in 1966 in Syosset, New York. He attended Broad Run High School and Los Alamos High School. He received a BA from St. John's College in Annapolis, Maryland, an STM from Harvard Divinity School, and a PhD The University of Notre Dame. After teaching at Villanova University and University of Notre Dame, Paffenroth began teaching at Iona College, where he is a Professor of Religious Studies. He is the author of numerous books on the Bible, theology, and pop culture, as well as a series of zombie-themed genre fiction. His book Gospel of the Living Dead: George Romero’s Visions of Hell on Earth won the Bram Stoker Award in the non-fiction category.

Paffenroth is married and has two children.

== Books ==
- Gospel of the Living Dead: George Romero’s Visions of Hell on Earth (2006), Baylor
- Dying to Live: A Novel of Life Among the Undead
- Dying to Live: Life Sentence
- Dying to Live: Last Rites
- Valley of the Dead: The Truth Behind Dante's Inferno
- Judas: Images of the Lost Disciple
