= Alex McVey =

American illustrator

- Born: Alex McVey
- Known for: Artist, illustrator, designer

Alex McVey is an American fine artist and illustrator from Texas, mostly known for his work on high-end limited edition books and album art. He has illustrated the works of Stephen King, William Peter Blatty, Brian Keene, Joe R. Lansdale, and others. McVey is known primarily for his work within the horror genre, and his use of a variety of styles, subject matter, and media. Clients include: Cemetery Dance Publications, Weird Tales, Centipede Press, and others.

== Selected bibliography ==
Alex McVey has illustrated works for:

=== Authors ===
- Stephen King
- William Peter Blatty
- Kate Morton
- Joe R. Lansdale
- Brian Keene
- Peter Straub
- John Shirley
- Dean Koontz
- John Farris
- Ronald Kelly
- Ray Garton
- Richard Matheson
- Joe Hill
- Norman Partridge
- Gahan Wilson
- Christa Faust
- Wrath James White
- J. F. Gonzalez
- Nate Southard
- Ramsey Campbell
- Gary Braunbeck
- James Newman
- Greg F. Gifune
- Richard Dean Starr
- James A. Moore
- Douglas Clegg
- Edward Lee

=== Companies and publishers ===
- Merde Skateboards
- Harley-Davidson
- Team Y&R

==== Film ====
- Troublemaker Studios
- New Line Cinema
- Bamfer Productions

==== Book & magazine publishers ====
- Apex
- Bloodletting Press
- Cemetery Dance Publications
- Centipede Press
- Delirium Books
- Earthling Publications
- Full Moon Press
- Lonely Road Books
- Necessary Evil Press
- Night Shade Books
- Paradox Magazine
- Thunderstorm Books
- Weird Tales

==== Role playing games ====
- Z-Man Games
- Hero Games
- Fantasy Flight Games
- Steve Jackson Games

=== Musicians and albums ===
- Straight Line Stitch When Skies Wash Ashore and The Word Made Flesh
- Elisium's Things They Carried album
- King Phaze
