= Mr. Maximillian Bacchus and His Travelling Circus =

2009 fantasy story collection by Clive Barker

The Adventures of Mr. Maximillian Bacchus and His Travelling Circus
- First edition
- Author: Clive Barker
- Illustrator: Richard A. Kirk
- Language: English
- Genre: Fantasy
- Publisher: Bad Moon Books
- Publication date: April 2009
- Publication place: United States
- Media type: Print (hardcover)
- Pages: 107
- ISBN: 978-0-9821546-1-8

The Adventures of Mr. Maximillian Bacchus and His Travelling Circus is a 2009 collection of four interconnected fantasy stories by British author Clive Barker. Written while Barker was in his early twenties and completed around 1974, the stories remained unpublished until Bad Moon Books issued them in a series of limited hardcover editions in 2009.

The volume was illustrated by Canadian artist Richard A. Kirk and includes an afterword by author David Niall Wilson.

== Background ==
Barker wrote the stories before the publication of the works for which he later became known, including the Books of Blood collections. According to Barker's official website, the material was written over a period of time and had been substantially completed by 1974, around the time he finished university.

Barker later cited Lord Dunsany as an influence on the stories, particularly in their use of fantastical names and settings. He also said that the ringmaster Maximillian Bacchus contained elements of himself.

The collection consists of four interwoven stories that together form a larger narrative centred on Bacchus and his travelling circus.

== Publication ==
Bad Moon Books published the collection in the United States in 2009. The first edition was issued as a limited hardcover of 1,500 signed copies.

Several more limited variants were also produced:

- a numbered edition of 300 copies, signed by Barker, Richard A. Kirk and David Niall Wilson and issued in a slipcase;
- a lettered edition of 26 copies, signed by Barker, Kirk and Wilson and issued in a traycase; and
- an ultra edition of 10 handmade copies signed by Barker and incorporating original artwork.

The ultra edition was completed in 2010.

== Illustrations ==
Richard A. Kirk provided the cover and interior artwork. Before publication, Kirk described the project as comprising four interconnected stories and said he was producing multiple interior illustrations as well as a wraparound cover.

Kirk's bibliography lists the book among his 2009 illustration projects and gives the ISBN as 978-0-9821546-1-8.
