= Michael Largo =

American writer

Michael Largo, born in Staten Island (New York) is an American writer. Largo received the Bram Stoker Award for Superior Achievement in Nonfiction, 2006, for Final Exits: The Illustrated Encyclopedia of How We Die.

The Portable Obituary was nominated for a Bram Stoker Award.

== Bibliography ==
- Nails in Soft Wood (Piccadilly Press, 1974)
- Southern Comfort (New Earth Books, 1977)
- Lies Within (Tropical Press, 1997; ISBN 0-9666173-0-4)
- Best of Pif. Edited by Camille Renshaw (Fusion Press, 2000; ISBN 1-928704-75-1)
- Unusual Circumstances : Short Fiction. (Pocol Press, 2000; ISBN 1-929763-03-4)
- Welcome to Miami (Tropical Press, 2001; ISBN 0-9666173-4-7)
- Final Exits: The Illustrated Encyclopedia of How We Die (HarperCollins, 2006; ISBN 0-06-081741-0)
- The Portable Obituary: How the Famous, Rich, and Powerful Really Died (HarperCollins, 2007; ISBN 0-06-123166-5)
- Genius and Heroin: The Illustrated Catalogue of Creativity, Obsession and Reckless Abandon Through the Ages' (HarperCollins, 2008 ISBN 0-06-146641-7)
- God's Lunatics: Lost Souls, False Prophets, Martyred Saints, Murderous Cults, Demonic Nuns, and Other Victims of Man's Eternal Search for the Divine (HarperCollins, 2010; ISBN 0-06-173284-2)
- The Big, Bad Book of Beasts: The World's Most Curious Creatures; William Morrow, ISBN 978-0062087454
- The Big, Bad Book of Botany: The World's Most Fascinating Flora; William Morrow; ISBN 978-0062282750

=== Co/author ===
- SEAL Survival Guide: A Navy SEAL's Secrets to Surviving Any Disaster; Gallery Books; ISBN 978-1451690293
- Easy Street (the Hard Way): A Memoir; Da Capo Press; ISBN 978-0306824180
