= Michael Knost =

American novelist

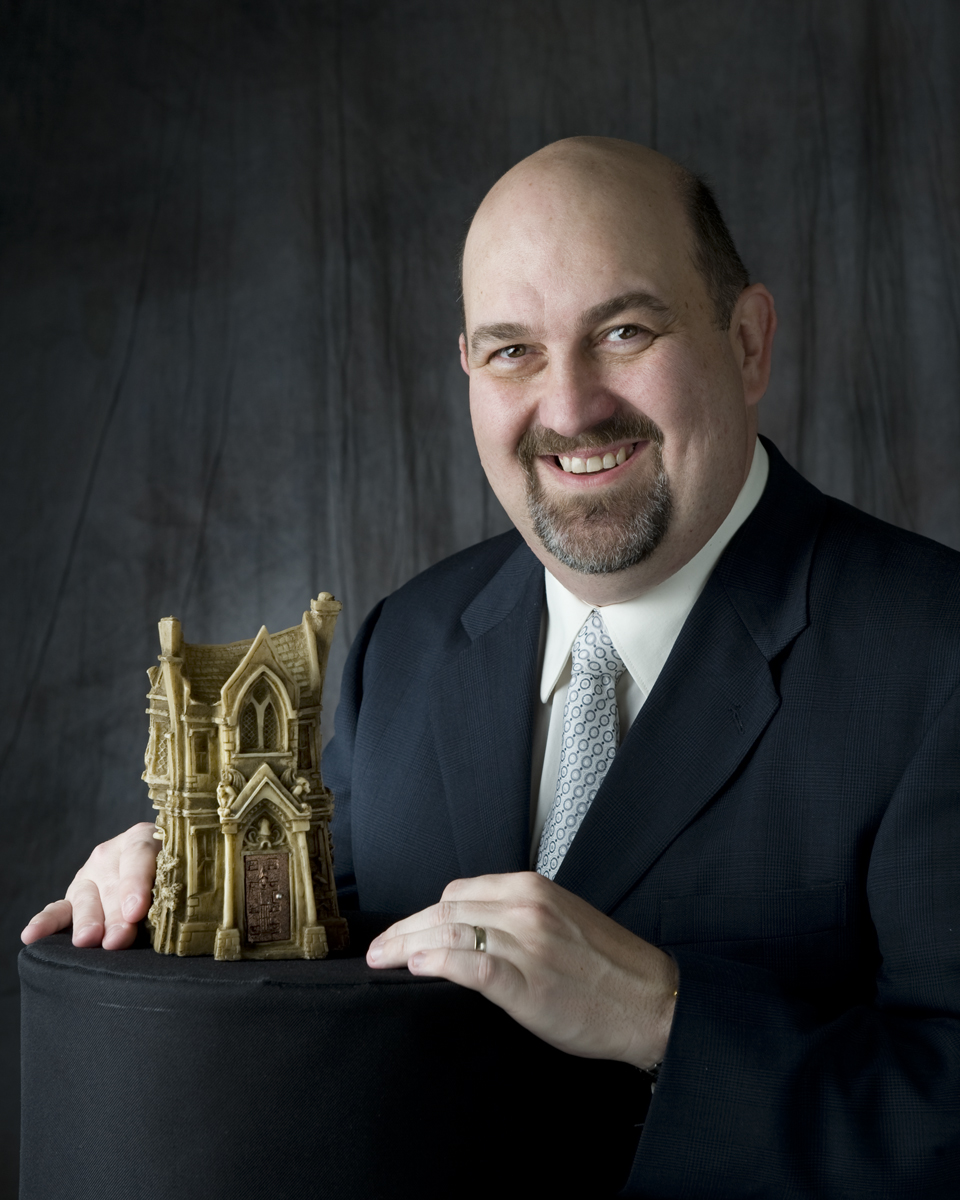

Michael Knost (born March 19, 1967) is the pen name of Michael Earl Collins, an American suspense author, anthology editor, magazine feature writer, and writing teacher/lecturer who lives in Chapmanville, West Virginia.

He is a former Horror Writers Association's mentorship program chairperson, Knost also teaches writing workshops and online classes.

Originally from Logan, West Virginia, Michael Knost now lives with his wife, Jewell and his daughter, Bella in Chapmanville, West Virginia.

== Publication history ==
Legends of the Mountain State (2007, Woodland Press), an anthology, written by storytellers across the nation, includes 13 accounts of ghostly manifestations and myths and mountain mythology, based on known legends from West Virginia. Themes included in this work are Mothman, the Ethel coalmine specter, the Chapmanville school haunting, the Ghost of #22, and many others. After the success of the first anthology, Knost went on to edit Legends of the Mountain State 2, Legends of the Mountain State 3, and Legends of the Mountain State 4, (Woodland Press 2008-2010) which received critical acclaim from Dark Scribe Magazine and Shroud Magazine.

Mothman Files (2011, Woodland Press), an anthology, discusses strange occurrences and alarming sightings in and around Point Pleasant, West Virginia—the mothman. Return of the Mothman (2014, Woodland Press), is the second installment of the "Mothman" series in which Ted Browning returns to his rural town in West Virginia and is forced to face his inner demons. Michael Knost received a Bram Stoker Award nomination in the category, "Superior Achievement in First Novel" in 2014 for this anthology.

Barbers and Beauties (Hummingbird House Press, co-edited with Nancy Eden Siegel,) an anthology, explores the dark possibilities of beauty told from the perspectives of four women and four men. Michael Knost and his co-editor received a Bram Stoker nomination for "Superior Achievement in Anthology" in 2013 for this flip book anthology.

Michael Knost's most critically acclaimed book thus far is Writer's Workshop of Horror (2009, Woodland Press), a non-fiction anthology that includes writing advice from the experts in the field. Knost won the Bram Stoker Award for "Superior Achievement in Non-Fiction," in 2009 and won The Black Quill Award for "Editor's Choice of Best Dark Genre of Non-Fiction."

=== Other publications ===
- Appalachian Winter Hauntings (2009, Woodland Press, co-edited with Mark Justice), an anthology
- Dark Tales of Terror (2010, Woodland Press), an anthology
- Specters in Coal Dust (2010, Woodland Press), an anthology
- Fed From the Blade (2012, Woodland Press), an anthology
- Writers Workshop of Science Fiction & Fantasy (2013, Seventh Star Press), a novel
- Author's Guide to Marketing with Teeth (2015, Seventh Star Press), a non-fiction book

== Awards and honors ==
Year	Recipient/Nominated Work	Award	Category	Result
2009	Writers Workshop of Horror	Bram Stoker Award	Superior Achievement in Non-Fiction	Won
2010	Writers Workshop of horror	Black Quill Award	Editor's Choice of Best Dark Genre of Non-Fiction	Won
2013	Barbers and Beauties	Bram Stoker Award	Superior Achievement in Anthology	Finalist
2014	Return of the Mothman	Bram Stoker Award	Superior Achievement in First Novel	Finalist
2015	Author's Guide to Marketing with Teeth	Bram Stoker Award	Superior Achievement in Non-Fiction	Finalist
2016	Mentorship Chairperson	HWA Silver Hammer Award	Work as organization's mentorship chairperson	Won
2017	WVW's Lifetime Achievement Award	J.U.G. Award	West Virginia Writer's Inc. Lifetime Achievement	Won
2021	Writers Workshop of Horror 2	Bram Stoker Award	Superior Achievement in Non-Fiction	Won
2021	HWA Mentorship	Mentor of the Year	HWA Individual Mentorship	Won
2025	One-Armed Bandit	Spur Award	Traditional Novel	Finalist
2026	Lifetime Work	Distinguished West Virginian Award	Recognized by Governor of West Virginia	Won
2026	Come Necessary (short story)	Will Rogers Medallion Award	Western Fiction Short Stories	Won
