= The Horror Zine =

US fantasy and horror magazine (2009–)

- Editor: Jeani Rector
- Categories: horror
- Frequency: Monthly
- First issue: July, 2009
- Country: United States
- Based in: Sacramento
- Language: English
- Website: thehorrorzine.com

The Horror Zine is an American fantasy and horror fiction pulp magazine first published in July 2009. The magazine was set up in Sacramento by Jeani Rector, a novelist and short-story writer. She has been the editor for the magazine's entire run, and is assisted by Dean H. Wild. The Horror Zine has published established, professional writers, including Graham Masterton, Joe R. Lansdale, Piers Anthony, Ramsey Campbell, Elizabeth Massie, Simon Clark, Tom Piccirilli, Melanie Tem, and Bentley Little.

== Staff ==
- Jeani Rector, Editor (2009–present)
- Dean H. Wild, Assistant Editor(2010–present)
- Bruce Memblatt, Kindle Coordinator (2012–present)
- Trish Wilson, Media Director (2021–present)
- Heather Miller, Book Reviewer (2022–present)
- John M. Cozzoli, Book Reviewer (2022–present)

== Anthologies ==
Several anthologies of stories from The Horror Zine have been published.

- And Now the Nightmare Begins (2009)
- Twice the Terror (2010)
- What Fears Become (2011)
- A Feast of Frights (2012)
- Shadow Masters (2013)
- Shrieks and Shivers From The Horror Zine (2015)
- The Best of The Horror Zine: The Early Years (2016)
- The Horror Zine's Book of Ghost Stories (2020)
- The Horror Zine's Book of Werewolf Stories (2022)
- The Best of The Horror Zine: The Middle Years (2022)

== Awards and recognition ==
- Nominated 2009 British Fantasy Society Long List for Best Magazine
- Nominated 2010 British Fantasy Society Long List for Best Magazine
- Winner 2010 Preditors and Editors Best Fiction Magazine
- Winner 2010 Preditors and Editors Best Poetry Magazine
- Winner 2011 Preditors and Editors Best Poetry Magazine
- Nominated 2012 British Fantasy Society Short List for Best Magazine
- Nominated 2013 British Fantasy Society Long List for Best Magazine
- First Place "Magazine of the Year" 2013 - This Is Horror
- First Place Best Fiction Magazine - Preditors and Editors Critters Workshop (Yearly from 2010 - 2021)
- First Place Best Poetry Magazine - Preditors and Editors Critters Workshop (Yearly from 2010 - 2021)

== See also ==
- Fantasy fiction magazine
- Horror fiction magazine
