= GCA =

GCA may refer to:

== Education ==
Cayman Islands

- Grace Christian Academy (Cayman Islands)

India

- Government College, Ajmer, Rajasthan
- Guwahati College of Architecture, in Assam

United Kingdom

- Greig City Academy, in London

United States

- Gahanna Christian Academy, in Columbus, Ohio
- Garland Christian Academy, in Garland, Texas
- Georgia-Cumberland Academy, in Calhoun, Georgia
- Global Communications Academy, in Hartford, Connecticut
- Granville Christian Academy, in Granville, Ohio
- Greenbrier Christian Academy, in Chesapeake, Virginia

== Science and mathematics ==
- GCA (gene)
- Generalized Clifford algebra
- Geochimica et Cosmochimica Acta, a scientific journal
- Giant-cell arteritis
- GCA, a codon for the amino acid alanine

== Sport ==
- Geelong Cricket Association, in Australia
- Goa Cricket Association, in India
- Gujarat Cricket Association, in India

== Other uses ==
- Garden Centers of America, an American trade organization
- GCA Airlines, a Colombia airline
- GCA Games Convention Asia, a video game and interactive technology convention
- GCA Savvian, an American investment bank
- Giant cell arteritis, a disorder
- Global Center on Adaptation, an international organization aiming to accelerate climate change adaptation solutions
- Goodreads Choice Awards, book awards
- Gothenburg City Airport, in Sweden
- Grand Canyon Association, an American fundraising organization
- Grand Central Airport (United States), a former airport in Glendale, California, United States
- Grand China Air, a Chinese airline
- The Great Canadian Appathon, a Canadian game design and development competition
- Great Commission Association, an association of evangelical Christian churches
- Greek Cypriot Administration of Southern Cyprus, a name used for the internationally recognized Republic of Cyprus by Turkey since they do not recognize it
- The Greeting Card Association, a British trade organization
- Ground-controlled approach
- Groceries Code Adjudicator, in the United Kingdom
- Gun Control Act of 1968, a U.S. federal law
- Gun Control Australia, an Australian lobbying group
- Greater Central Asia, a region of Eurasia
