= Flame Tree Publishing =

British publisher

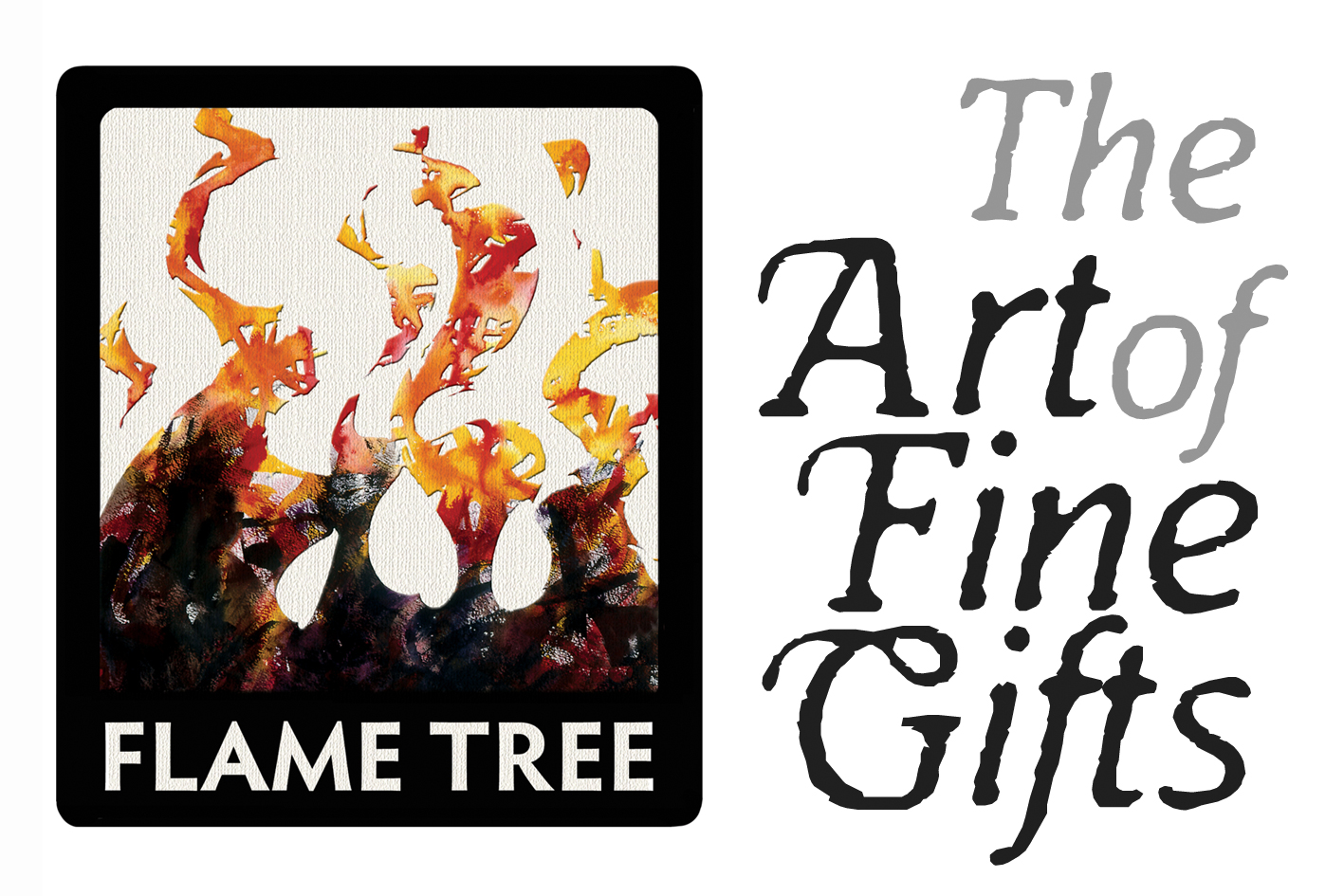
- Founded: 1992
- Country of origin: United Kingdom
- Headquarters location: London, SW6
- Distribution: Hachette UK Distribution (UK); Peribo (Australia); Simon & Schuster (US)
- Publication types: Books, calendars, ebooks, gift stationery
- Nonfiction topics: Art, Music, Fiction, Recipes, Lifestyle, computing
- Fiction genres: Science fiction, horror books and ebooks
- Imprints: Flame Tree Press (novels, Horror, SF, Fantasy & crime); Flame Tree iGuides (ebook non-fiction); Flame Tree 451 (F & SF ebooks); Flame Tree Audio (audiobooks)
- Official website: flametreepublishing.com

Flame Tree Publishing is an independent publisher of books, calendars and other stationery items, based in Fulham, London, United Kingdom with an editorial office in New York. It focuses on art, music, lifestyle and fiction categories. Flame Tree creates content in the form of paper printed encyclopedias, guides and practical books and publishes them in different book, gift, stationery and digital markets worldwide. It has a number of license arrangements with museums, galleries and other licensors, including Tate, V&A and The Royal Academy of Arts. The publisher started releasing e-books and launched a new fantasy, crime and science fiction classics imprint called Flame Tree 451. In 2015 Flame Tree launched a range of deluxe Gothic Fantasy titles combining new stories from open submissions and curated classic writing. In 2018 a new trade fiction imprint called Flame Tree Press began to publish new novels in the horror and suspense, science fiction and fantasy, and crime and mystery genres.

== Origins ==
Flame Tree was established in 1992 as The Flame Tree Publishing Company, a part-time illustrated art book and gift packaging operation by founder Nick Wells. In 1995, Wells left HarperCollins Publishers to turn Flame Tree into a full-time business, operating from an office in Chiswick. The company name was changed to The Foundry Creative Media Company Ltd but Flame Tree Publishing was retained as the publishing imprint and brand. Managing Director Frances Bodiam joined in 1996. Wells and Bodiam continue to run the business. In 2012 The company name changed to Flame Tree Publishing Ltd and John Holloran and Ross Clayton of Marston Book Services Ltd invested to provide distribution and accounting services. In May 2023 Flame Tree left Marston to join Hachette UK Distribution.

== Activity ==
In the first few years Flame Tree's main activity was to create a range of packaged books for a series of corporate publishers, including HarperCollins (25 of the original colour reference Collins Gems and two illustrated encyclopedias), Dorling Kindersley (including 16 K.I.S.S. Guides, such as Astrology) and 24 of the then Letts Education's Success Guides to KS3, and GCSE.

During this period Flame Tree started to create and sell calendars and greeting cards to retail markets and has exhibited at the Spring Fair and Autumn International Gift Shows at the NEC since 1997.

In 1998, Flame Tree moved into new premises on the borders of Hammersmith and Fulham, close to The River Café (London) and, at that time, a few minutes walk from several other publishers, Virgin Books, HarperCollins and Constable & Robinson. Flame Tree started publishing into the UK and international markets, focusing on art, music, cookery and general reference. Among its first books were Guitar Facts, An Illustrated Guide (ISBN 9781904041726) and Simple Cookery: Wok and Stir Fry (ISBN 9781903817049) both of which demonstrate Flame Tree's method of creating practical content for everyday use. Step-by-step photos continue to be a feature of many of their publications. In 2015 Flame Tree moved to its current premises near the Kings Road in Fulham, by Putney Bridge tube station, coinciding with a greater concentration on art, music and fiction.

Flame Tree exhibits at a number annual trade shows including the London Book Fair, The Spring Fair International Gift Show, Frankfurt Book Fair, BookExpo America. and The Beijing International Bookfair.

Flame Tree's brand The Art of Fine Gifts includes illustrated art books, art calendars and deluxe notebooks featuring licensed and created art by a wide range of modern artists and illustrators such as Josephine Wall, Kerim Beyit, Ann Stokes and Lesley Anne Ivory

In 2019 Flame Tree and the Chinese media giant Phoenix Publishing and Media Group held a signing ceremony at the Beijing International Bookfair for a cooperation venture in the Chinese and English language markets.

== Gothic, dark fantasy and science fiction ==
2015 saw the publication of the first titles in a range of short story collections which combined new writing from submission calls online, and classic writing. Examples include Chilling Ghosts Short Stories, Time Travel Short Stories and Agents & Spies Short Stories.

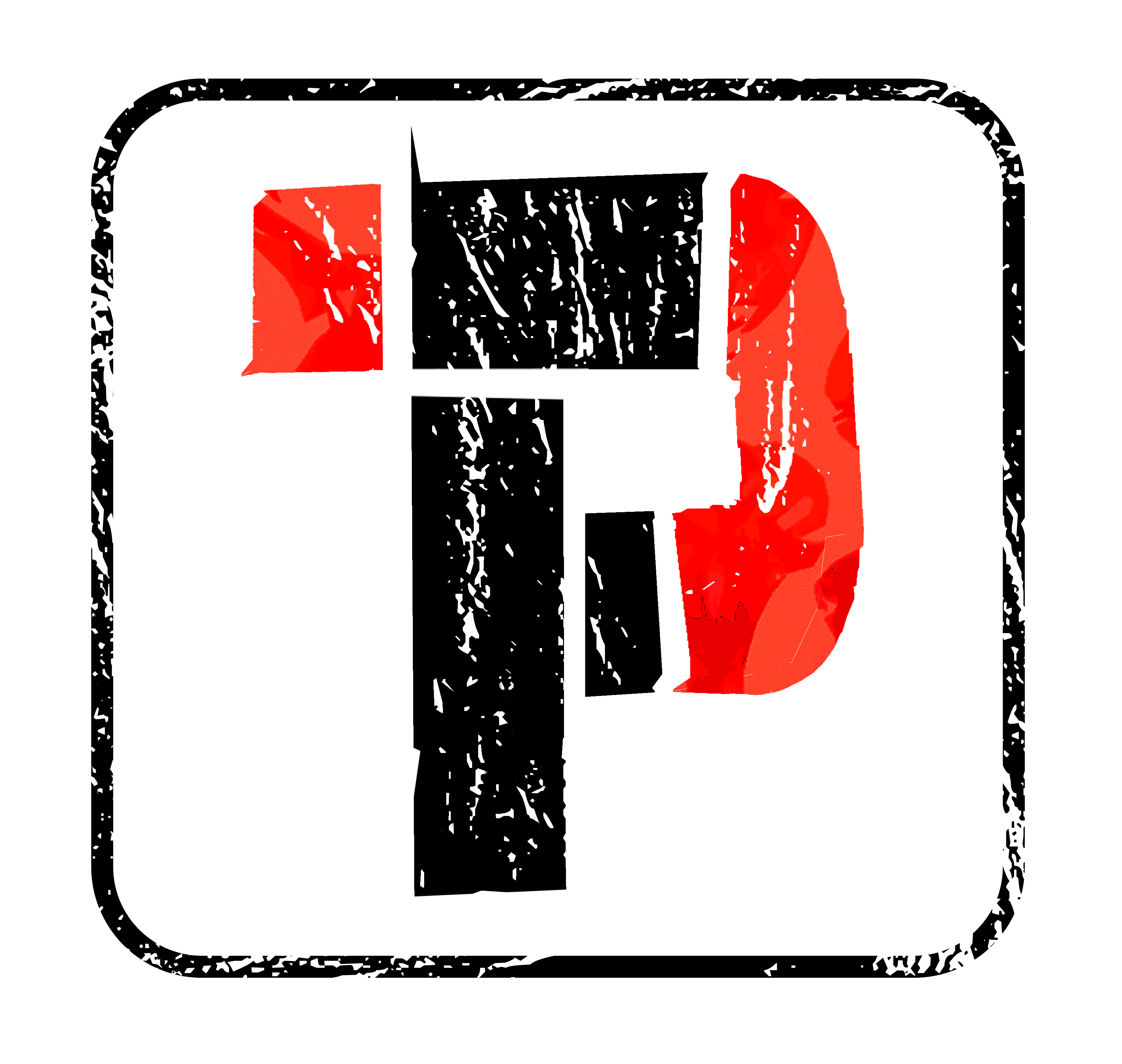
Flame Tree Press colophon for fiction imprint of Flame Tree Publishing Ltd

In 2018 the company launched Flame Tree Press, a trade imprint for novels in genre fiction, mainly horror, sf, dark fantasy and crime. First writers included Bram Stoker Award winner John Everson, Jonathan Janz and Brian Trent, with new writers and novels in translation from China. Ramsey Campbell endorsed the launch of the new list which included the publication of his own Thirteen Days by Sunset Beach.

In 2020 Flame Tree announced a partnership with Compelling Science Fiction magazine, a US publisher of science fiction.

== Trade bodies ==
Flame Tree is a member of the Independent Publishers Guild (IPG) and The Greeting Card Association (GCE).
