= Grace Christian School =

Grace Christian School or Grace Christian Academy can refer to:

== United States ==
- Grace Christian School in Anchorage, Alaska
- Grace Christian School (Florida) in Valrico, Florida
- Grace Christian Academy (Illinois) in Kankakee, Illinois
- Grace Christian School (Michigan) in Saginaw, Michigan
- Grace Christian Academy (New York) in Merrick, New York
- Grace Christian School (North Carolina) in Raleigh, North Carolina
- Grace Christian School in Blacklick, Ohio
- Grace Christian School (Oklahoma) in Broken Arrow, Oklahoma
- Grace Christian Academy (Tennessee) in Franklin, Tennessee
- Grace Christian Academy (Texas) in Clear Lake City, Houston
- Grace Christian Academy (Northern Mariana Islands) in Saipan, Northern Mariana Islands

== Cayman Islands ==
- Grace Christian Academy (Cayman Islands) in Grand Cayman
