= List of George Floyd protests in the United States =

Inspired by the murder of George Floyd

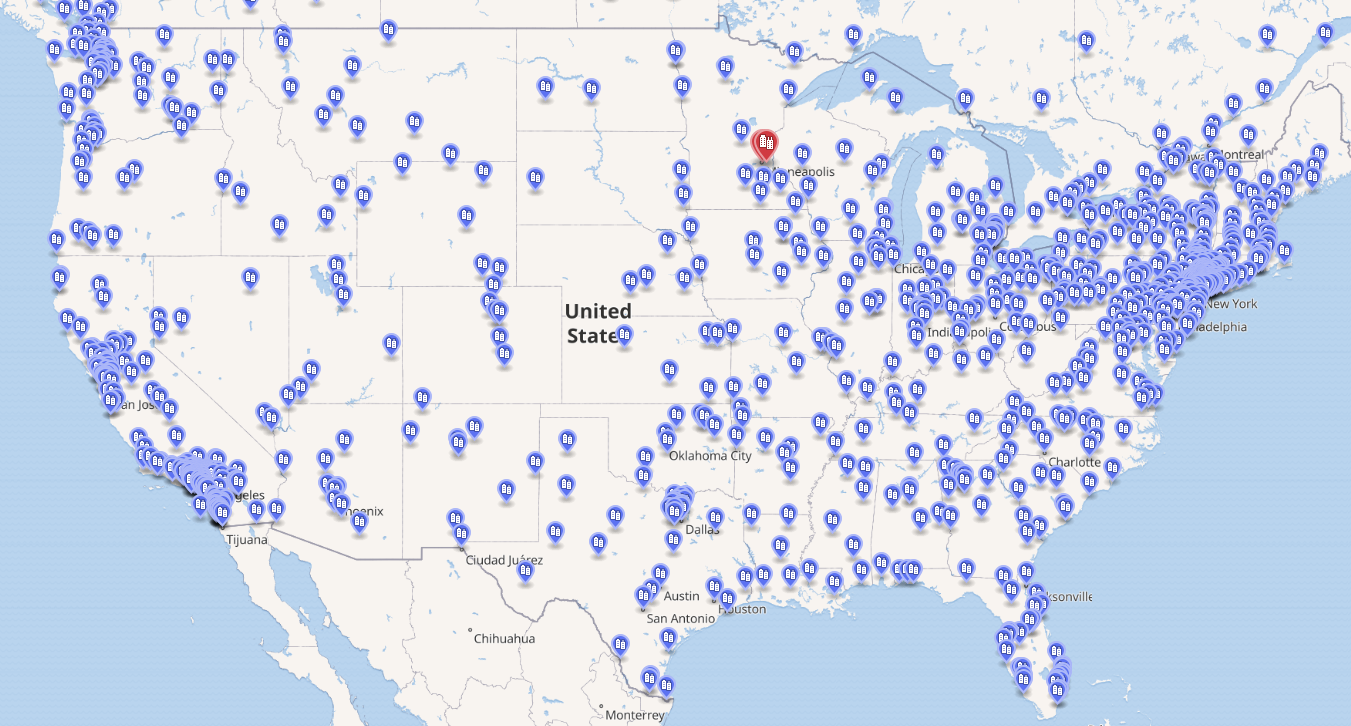
Map of protests in North America with over 100 participants. Minneapolis-St. Paul is marked in red. (click for a larger, dynamic version of the map)

This is a list of protests and unrest in the United States related to the murder of George Floyd. The protests began in Minneapolis on May 26, 2020, the day after George Floyd, an African-American man, was murdered by police officer Derek Chauvin during an arrest. On June 6, an estimated half a million people joined protests in 550 places across the country. Protests continued through the weekend of June 19, overlapping with and bringing awareness to observations of Juneteenth. Protests had continued throughout the entire month of June in many cities, with protests occurring in over 40% of counties in the United States. Polls estimate between 15 million and 26 million people participated in the United States, making these protests potentially the largest movement in terms of participation in U.S. history. The riots cause an estimated $1–2 billion in claimed insurance damages nationwide.

The protests spread to over 2,000 cities and towns in all 50 states and all 5 permanently-inhabited territories, as well as in over 60 other countries, with demonstrators supporting those seeking justice for Floyd and the wider Black Lives Matter movement, and speaking out against police brutality. Many protests were accompanied by violence with some large cities seeing large scale rioting, looting, and burning of businesses and police cars. There were also many instances of police brutality. The wave of protests and unrest has been compared to the long, hot summer of 1967 and the King assassination riots, both of which saw riots in over 10 cities across the United States.

Outside the United States, protests against the murder of George Floyd, racism, and police brutality also took place, notably in the cities of Accra, Athens, Auckland, Barcelona, Berlin, Brisbane, Cape Town, Copenhagen, Dublin, Lagos, Madrid, Melbourne, Nairobi, Paris, Perth, Rio de Janeiro, Seoul, Sydney, Tel Aviv, Tokyo, and Vienna, as well as in the countries of Canada and the United Kingdom. Protests occurred in over 60 countries and on all continents, including Antarctica. (Note: All sources listed at List of George Floyd protests outside the United States.)

The protests resulted in police reforms being proposed on the federal level in the United States and in jurisdictions in over 20 states. The protests were also associated with the removal of numerous monuments and statues of figures with controversial legacies. In response, the Trump administration deployed federal law enforcement to several cities across the country.

== Alabama ==
On May 31, around 1,000 people gathered in Birmingham in a protest that ended in vandalism and a state of emergency being declared. On June 1, over 1,000 protesters rallied near the courthouse in Huntsville and police fired tear gas on protesters. In addition, protests took place in Anniston, Ashland, Auburn, Dothan, Enterprise, Fort Payne, Gadsden, Hoover, Jacksonville, Mobile, Montgomery, Opelika, Troy, and Tuscaloosa.

== Alaska ==
Protests were held in at least twelve communities across Alaska, including Anchorage, Bethel, Fairbanks, Haines, Homer, Juneau, Ketchikan, Kodiak, Kotzebue, Palmer, Sitka, and Utqiaġvik. Protests were held on May 30 in Juneau, Fairbanks, and Anchorage, and occurred in other communities through June.

== Arizona ==
Through June 2020, Phoenix had seen protests for five weeks, beginning on May 28. In addition to Phoenix, protests were held in Casa Grande, Flagstaff, Fountain Hills, Kingman, Lake Havasu City, Maricopa, Mesa, Nogales, Prescott, Safford, Scottsdale, Surprise, Tempe, Tucson and Yuma.

== Arkansas ==
On May 30, 2020, hundreds of people in Little Rock participated in a demonstration at the Arkansas State Capitol. The protest turned violent in the evening, as protesters shot fireworks at police, who responded by firing tear gas. Protests were also held in Bentonville, Cabot, Conway, El Dorado, Fayetteville, Fort Smith, Jonesboro, Pine Bluff, Rogers, Russellville, and Texarkana.

== California ==
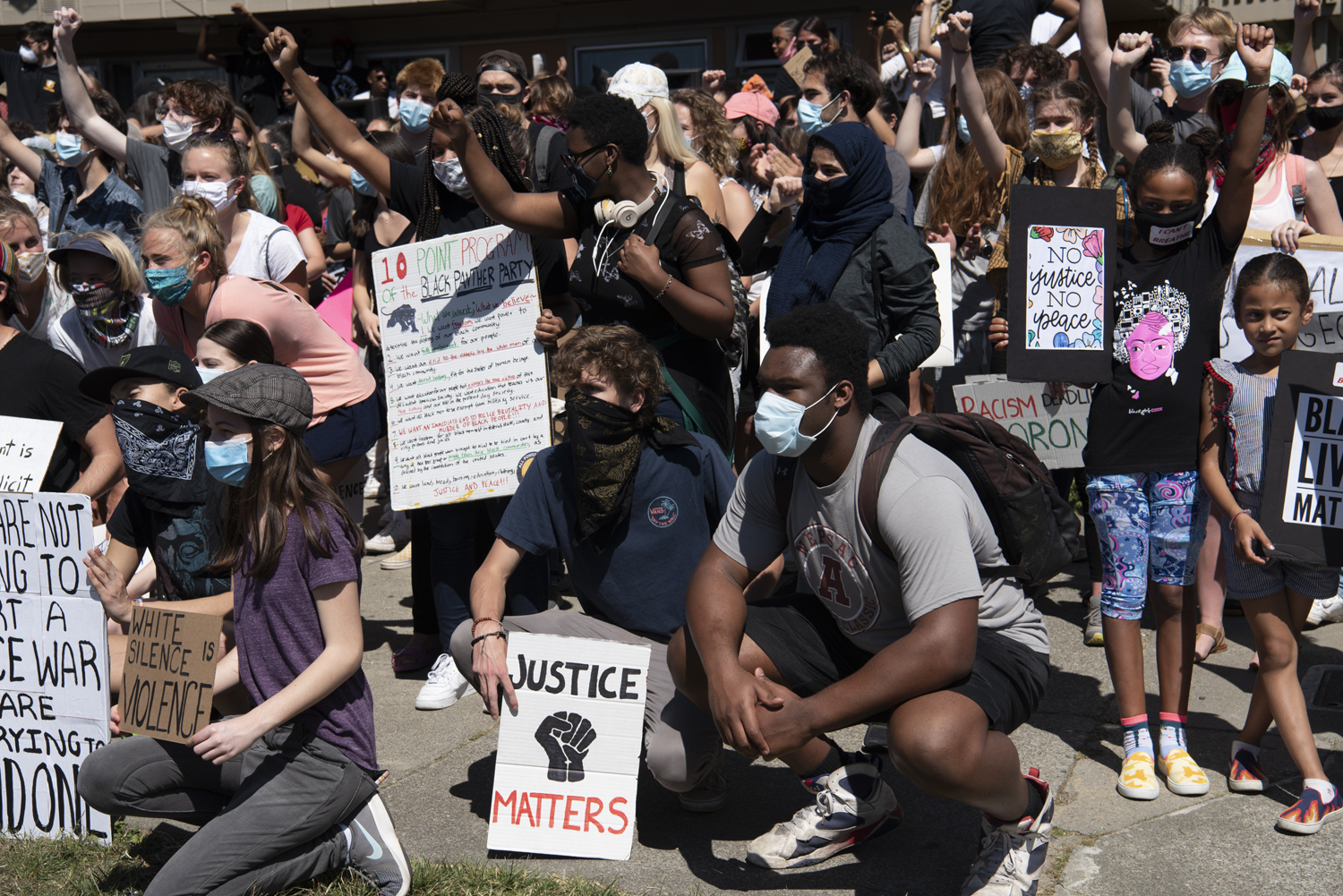
Protesters in Marin City, California on June 2

Through June 15, protests occurred in at least 171 cities in California. Protests happened in dozens of towns throughout both Northern and Southern California, with major multi-day protests occurring in Oakland, Sacramento, San Francisco, San Diego County, and Los Angeles.

== Colorado ==
On May 28, 2020, protesters in Denver walked for 240 minutes, obstructing vehicles on Interstate 25 and protesting at Colorado State Capitol. Protests continued in Denver for at least twelve days through June 8. In addition to Denver, protests occurred in Alamosa, Aspen, Aurora, Boulder, Colorado Springs, Fort Collins, Glenwood Springs, Greeley, and Pueblo.

== Connecticut ==
On May 29, hundreds of people protested in front of the Connecticut State Capitol. On May 30, more than 1,000 people marched to the Hartford Police Department and the Capitol. On June 6, hundreds of protesters attended multiple events in Hartford. The first one, called "No Lives Matter Until Black Lives Matter: Protest for Our Future", marched from Pope Park to the Capitol Building. A second protest was held at the Global Communications Academy, while another group marched from Bushnell Park to the Connecticut Supreme Court, where a silent sit-in was held. Protests in Connecticut also took place in more than thirty other communities.

== Delaware ==
On May 31, 2020, dozens of people in Dover congregated at the Delaware Legislative Hall and Dover Police Department before walking north along U.S. Route 13 in Delaware, resulting in parts of the road being closed. Protests in Delaware also occurred in Camden, Frankford, Georgetown, Middletown, Newark, Rehoboth Beach, Seaford, and Wilmington.

== District of Columbia ==
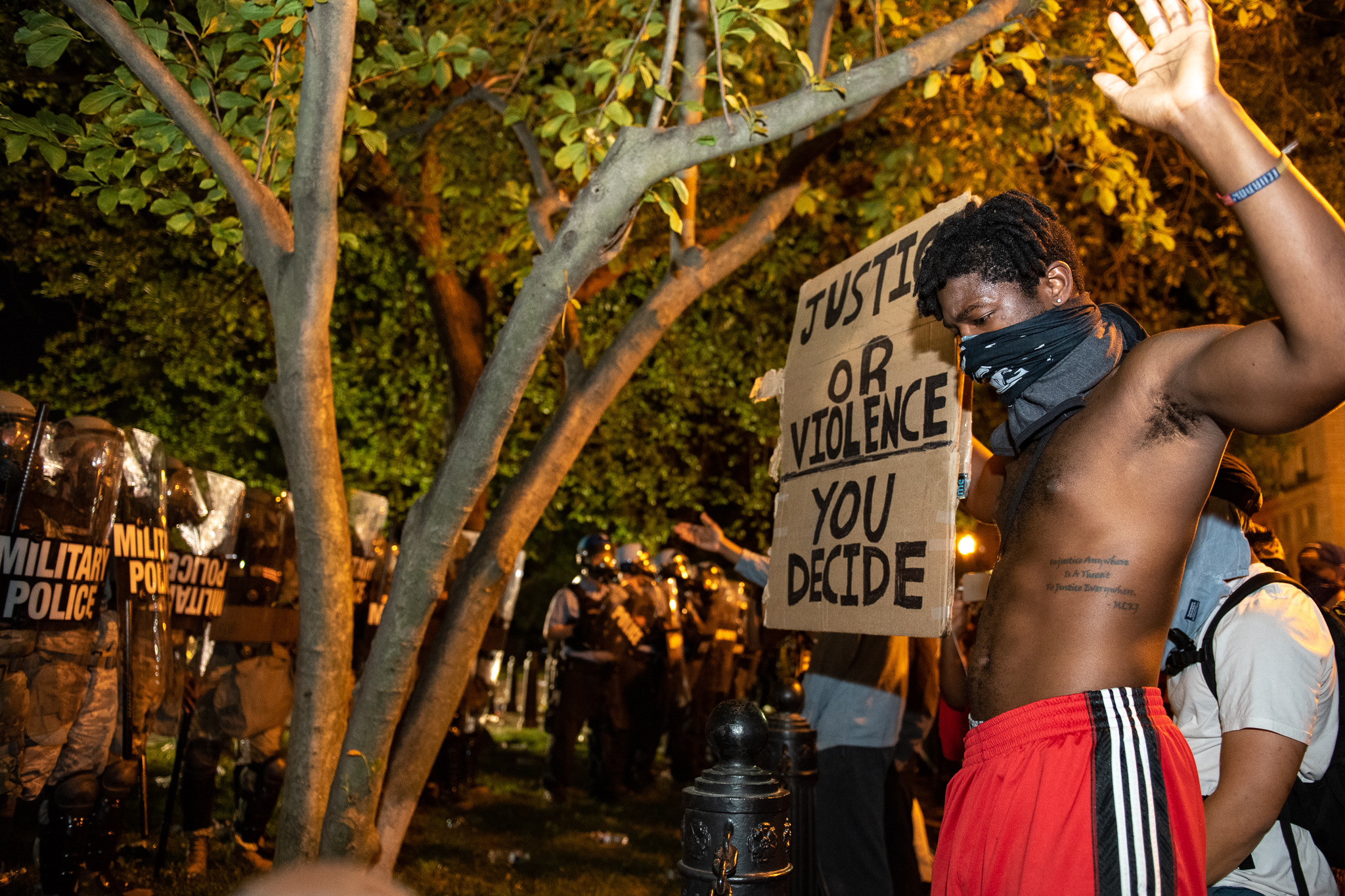
Protester facing military police in Lafayette Square next to the White House on May 30

Protesters in Washington, D.C. gathered around the White House the evening of May 29, which went under lockdown. President Trump was escorted to hide in an underground bunker, where he stayed for almost an hour. Outside, the historic St. John's Church was set on fire. Trump reacted by threatening protesters with "the most vicious dogs, and most ominous weapons" if they crossed the White House fence. Rubber bullets, pepper spray, smoke canisters, and stun grenades were used on the protesters.

On May 30 and 31 there was looting and vandalism with several monuments being defaced. On June 1, tear gas and rubber bullets were used to forcefully clear protesters from Lafayette Square so that President Trump could have his picture taken at St. John's, which had survived the fire. Police said the protesters were throwing bricks and other projectiles, although journalists at the scene said the protesters were peaceful. In addition, millions fell for a hoax claiming that communication channels had been severed in the area.

By June 3 thousands of National Guard troops from ten states, as well as law enforcement personnel from a dozen federal agencies, were ordered to the city and deployed on the streets. On June 7, U.S. Senator Mitt Romney (R-UT) joined the protests.

On June 22, a crowd of rioters unsuccessfully attempted to topple Clark Mills' 1852 bronze equestrian statue of Andrew Jackson in Lafayette Square in President's Park, directly north of the White House. A few days later, the United States Department of Justice charged four men with destruction of federal property for allegedly trying to bring down the statue. The Justice Department alleged that a video showed one of the men breaking off and destroying the wheels of the cannons located at the base of the statue as well as pulling on ropes trying to bring down the statue.

== Florida ==
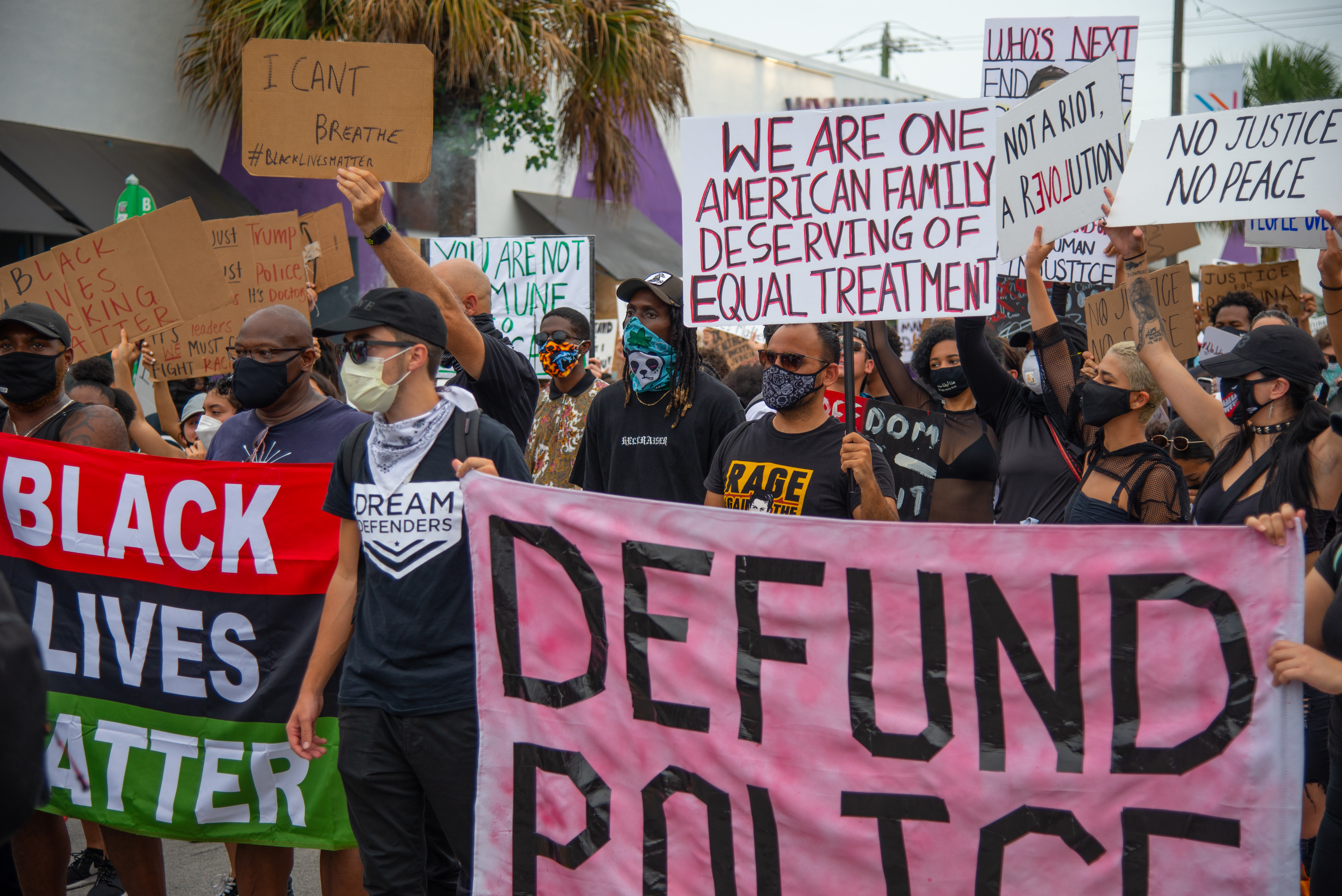
Protesters in Miami on June 7

Protests occurred in dozens of cities in Florida, including multi-day protests in Miami and a protest outside of Derek Chauvin's summer home in Windermere. Protests became violent in Fort Lauderdale, Jacksonville, Miami, Tampa, and West Palm Beach. The Governor activated the Florida National Guard on May 31.

== Georgia ==
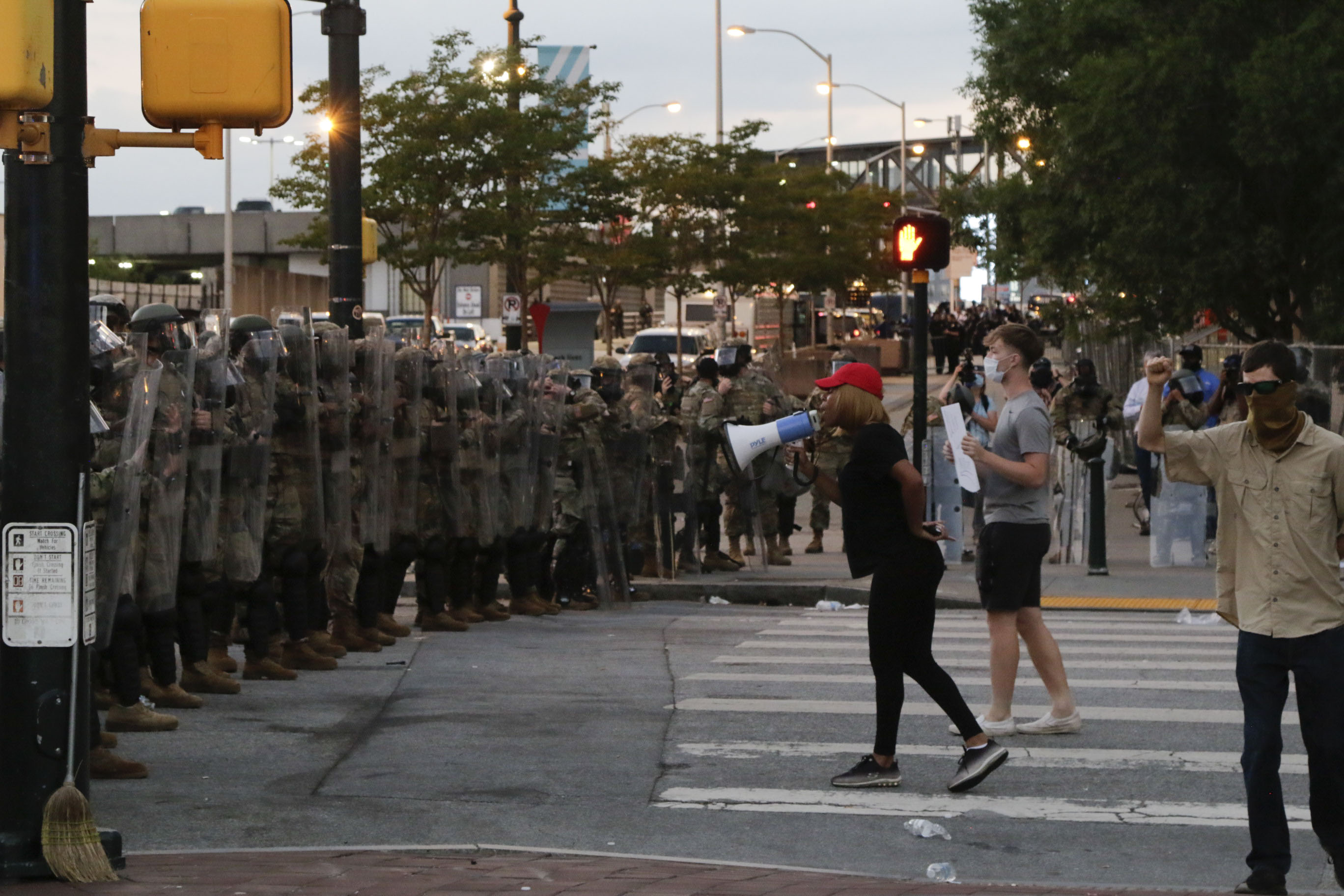
Protest in Atlanta, Georgia on June 1

On May 29, hundreds of protesters in Atlanta marched to the CNN Center, where some protesters vandalized the building. They clashed with police, who dispersed them that evening and boarded up the building. Protests continued in Atlanta through June 6. The governor deployed the Georgia National guard on May 31. In addition to Atlanta, protests were held in at least 20 communities in Georgia, including Albany, Americus, Athens, Augusta, Carrollton, Cartersville, Columbus, Dalton, Duluth, Hinesville, Kennesaw, Macon, Marietta, Newnan, Rome, Sandy Springs, Savannah, Statesboro, Thomasville, Valdosta, and Warner Robins.

== Hawaii ==
In Honolulu, protests began on May 30, when more than 100 protesters gathered in front of the Hawaii State Capitol. On June 3, almost 200 more people protested at the Capitol, and on June 5, over 1,000 protesters walked from Ala Moana beach to Duke Paoa Kahanamoku's statue. Additional protests, including paddle-outs, occurred in Hanalei, Hilo, Kaanapali, Kahului, Kailua-Kona, Launiupoko, Lihue, and Nanakuli.

== Idaho ==
Three protests took place in front of the Idaho State Capitol in Boise from May 30 to June 1. Protests also occurred in at least ten other communities in Idaho, including Coeur d’Alene, Hailey, Idaho Falls, Ketchum, Lewiston, Pocatello, Rexburg, Sandpoint, Twin Falls, and Victor.

== Illinois ==
Protests were held in at least 24 communities throughout Illinois, with major demonstrations occurring in Chicago. In addition to Chicago, Champaign-Urbana, Peoria, Rockford, Springfield, and St. Charles all saw protests with at least 1,000 demonstrators. Protests were also held in Aurora, Barrington, Belleville, Bloomington, Bradley, Calumet City, Canton, Downers Grove, Elgin, Hinsdale, Joliet, LaSalle, Monticello, Mount Vernon, Naperville, New Lenox, Oregon, Orland Park, Waukegan and Schaumburg.

== Indiana ==
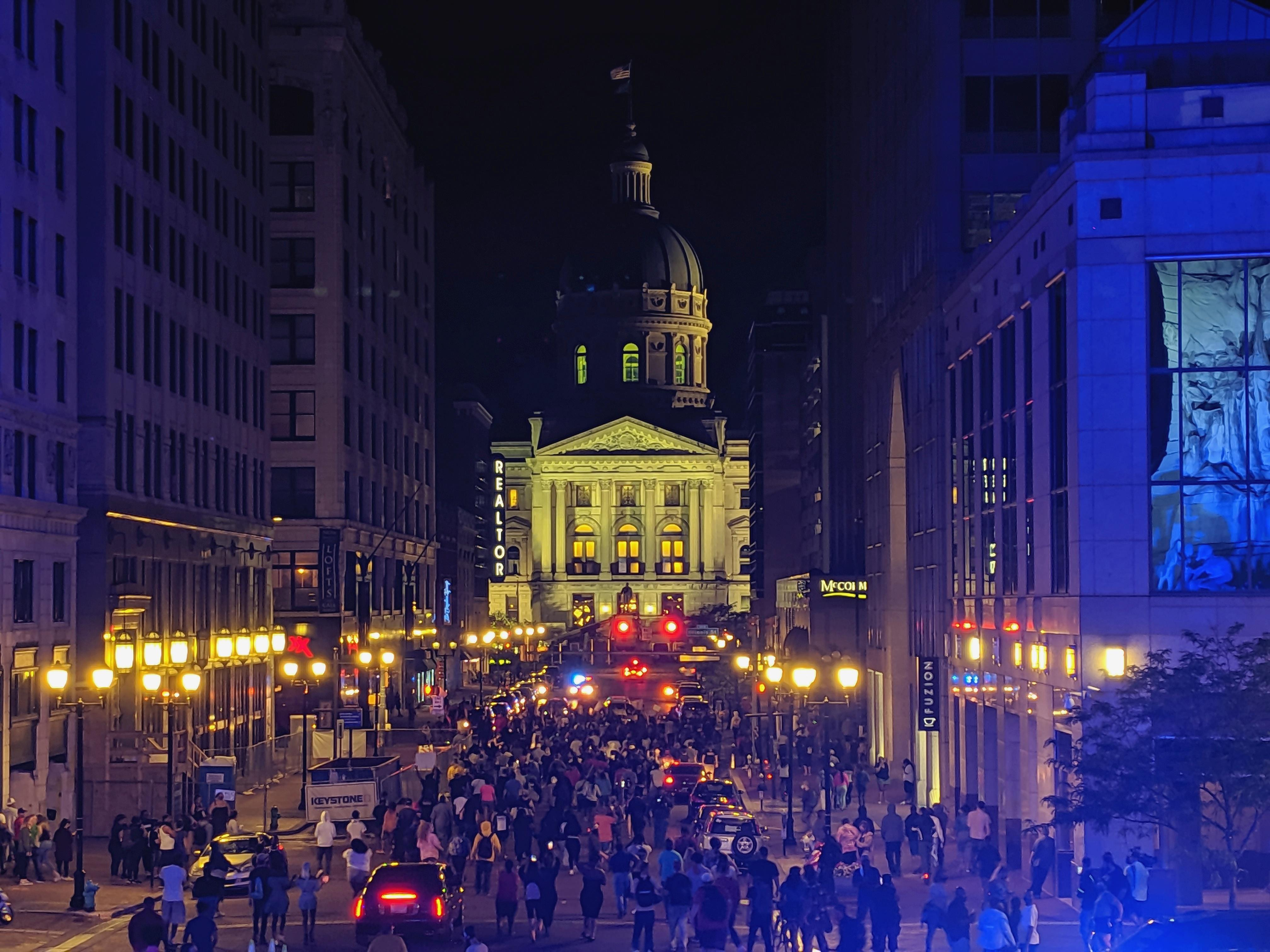
The Indiana Statehouse in Indianapolis on May 29

The Indianapolis metropolitan area saw daily demonstrations since May 29 that ended soon thereafter, including a demonstration of thousands on June 6. Police and protesters clashed in downtown Indianapolis on May 29, with some protesters breaking windows at local businesses and several police officers being injured. In addition to Indianapolis, protests and demonstrations were held in at least 17 communities throughout the state, including Anderson, Avon, Bloomington, Brownsburg, Carmel, Elkhart, Evansville, Fort Wayne, Gary, Goshen, Greenwood, Hammond, Kokomo, Lafayette, Marion, Michigan City, Muncie, Peru, South Bend, and Warsaw.

== Iowa ==
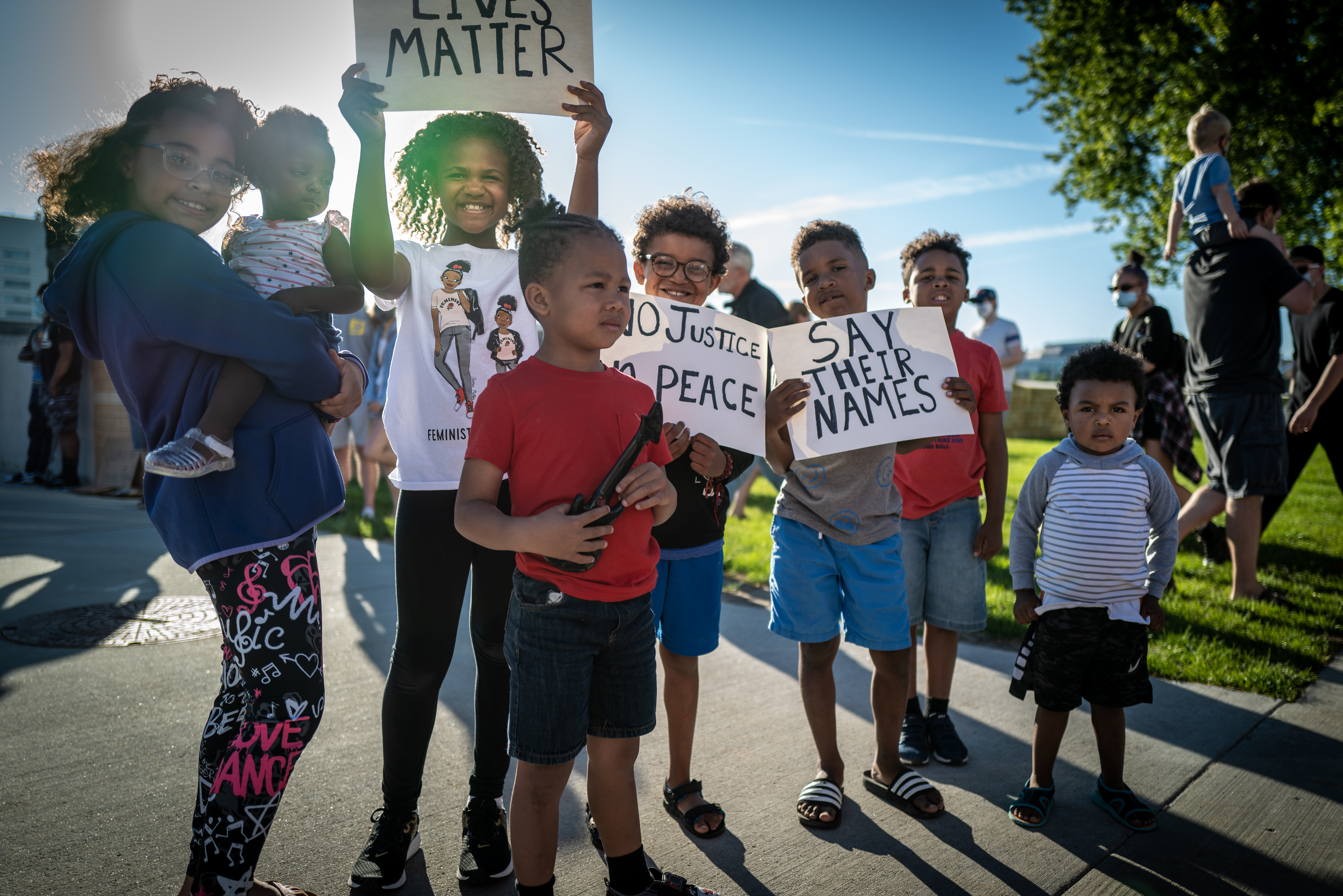
Protesters in Des Moines, Iowa on May 29

Dozens of people clashed with law enforcement near Des Moines police headquarters on May 29, 2020. A march on May 30, 2020 spilled over to the Iowa State Capitol and the Court Avenue entertainment district. Protests were also held in at least ten other communities throughout Iowa, including Ames, Cedar Rapids, Davenport, Decorah, Dubuque, Iowa City, Mason City, Ottumwa, Sioux City, and Waterloo.

== Kansas ==
On May 30, 2020, hundreds of individuals demonstrated peacefully at the Kansas State Capitol in Topeka. Protests took place in Kansas City for at least 10 consecutive days. Protests in Kansas were also held in at least 14 other communities, including Coffeyville, Derby, Fort Scott, Great Bend, Hays, Hutchinson, Lawrence, Leavenworth, Manhattan, Olathe, Parsons, Wichita, and Winfield.

== Kentucky ==
On May 28, 2020, hundreds of people walked through the city of Louisville to demand justice for the shooting of Breonna Taylor. Later during the protest, seven people were shot by an unknown shooter or shooters, with one victim critically injured. Protests in Kentucky also occurred in at least ten other communities, including Bowling Green, Corbin, Covington, Elsmere, Hopkinsville, Lexington, Morehead, Owensboro, Paducah, and Pikeville.

== Louisiana ==
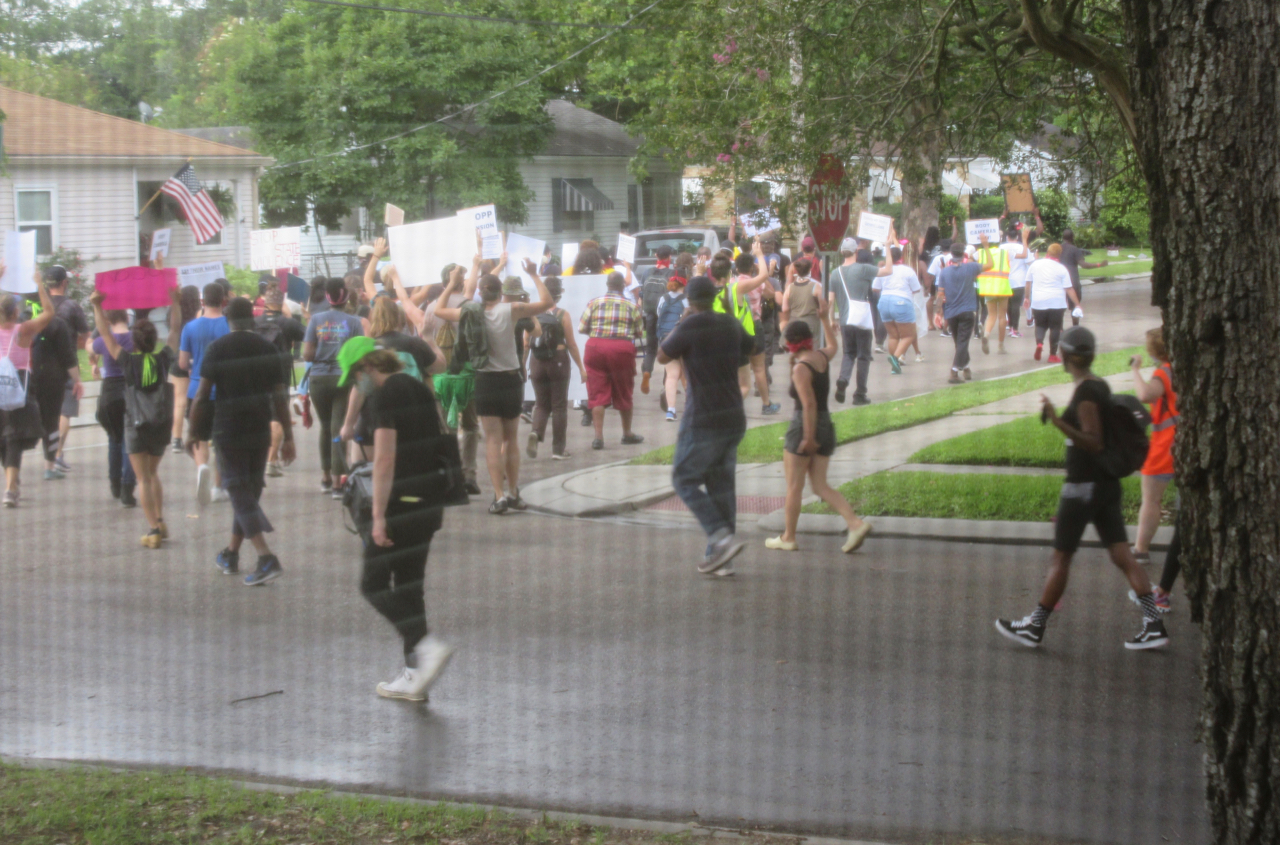
Protest in Old Jefferson, Louisiana on June 6

On May 31, 2020, hundreds of people walked to Louisiana State Capitol building in Baton Rouge. More protests happened on Siegen Lane from May 31 to June 2. On June 3, hundreds of protesters in New Orleans attempted to breach a police barrier on the Crescent City Connection; the police fired tear gas and rubber balls on the protesters. Protests in Louisiana were also held in at least eight other communities, including Alexandria, Houma, Lafayette, Lake Charles, Monroe, New Iberia, Shreveport, and Winnsboro.

== Maine ==
On June 7, 2020, over one thousand people walked near Capitol Park and the Augusta Police Department in Augusta. Individuals also lay down on the ground in front of the Maine state house for nine minutes in memory of George Floyd. Protests in Maine were also held in Bangor, Belfast, Camden, Caribou, Lewiston, Portland, Presque Isle, Rockland, Sanford, South Portland, and Waterville.

== Maryland ==
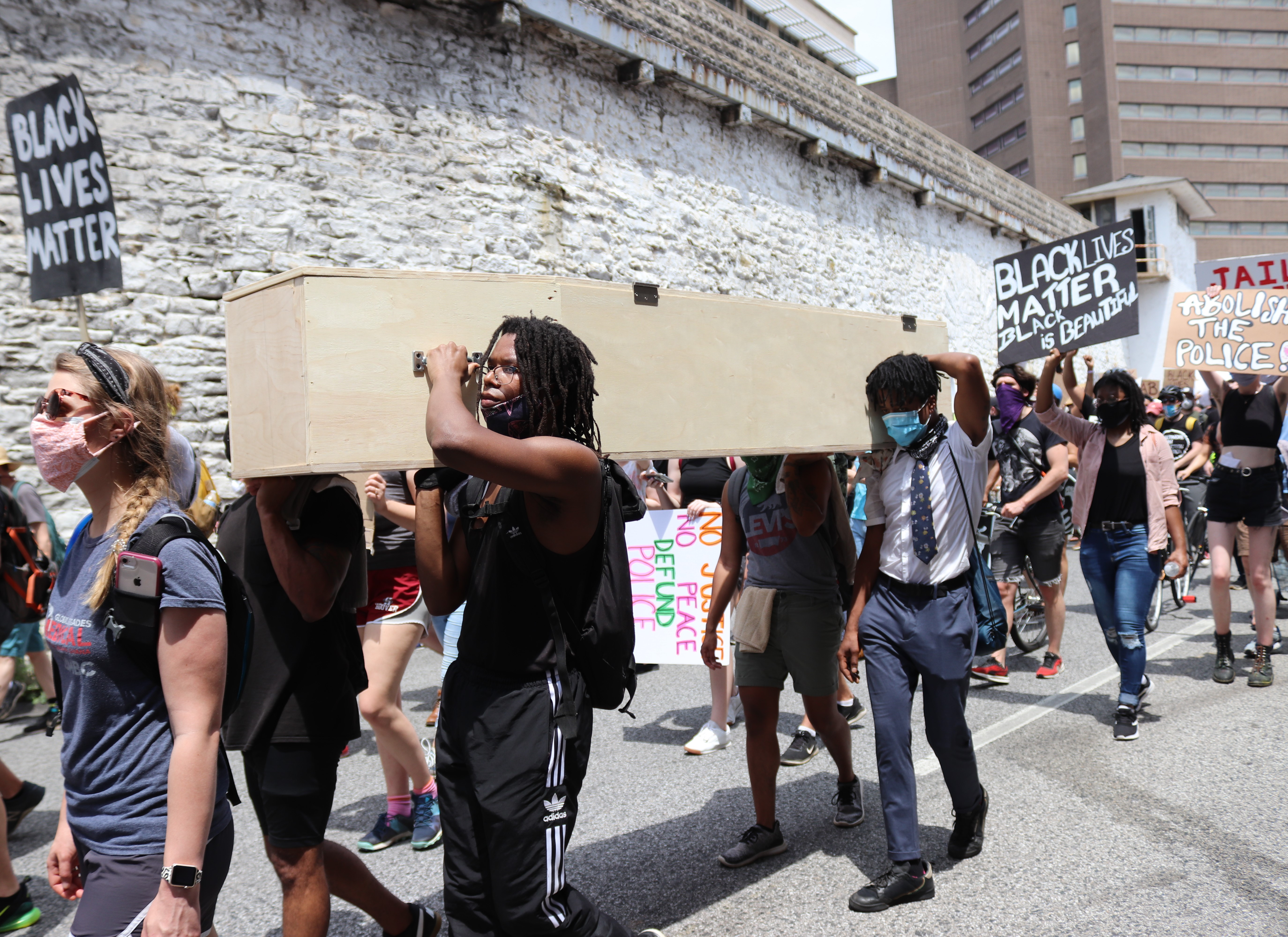
Protesters in Baltimore carrying a fake coffin on June 6

Maryland underwent a multitude of protests, with thousands of people walking in protests around the state. Protests took place in Annapolis, Baltimore, Bel Air, Bethesda, Columbia, Frederick, Germantown, and Leisure World, in addition to other localities across the state including Cumberland, Prince Frederick, Sykesville, Westminster, Taneytown and Rockville.

== Massachusetts ==
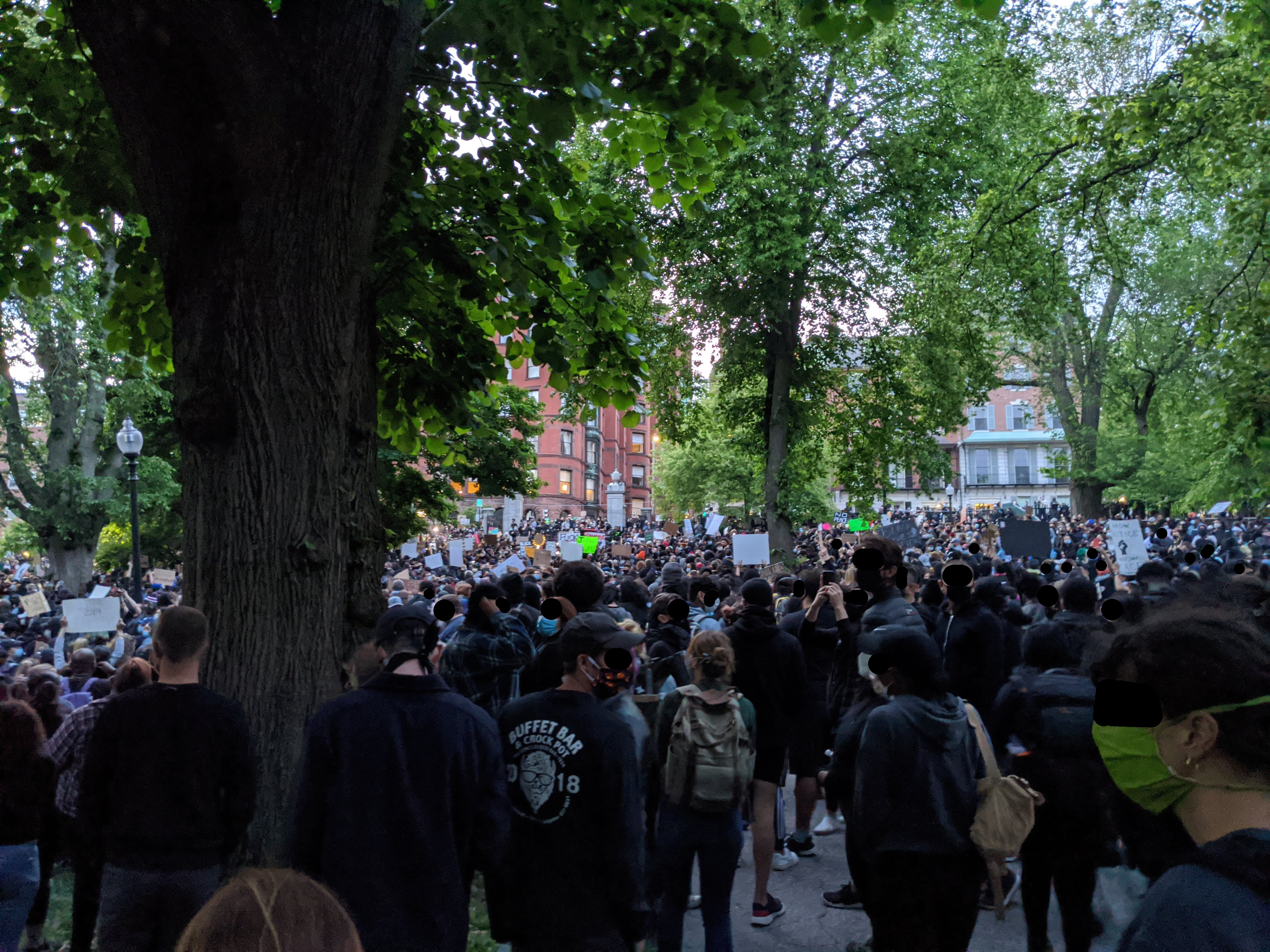
Thousands of protesters gathered on Sunday, May 31 in Boston Common following a march from Nubian Square

On Sunday, May 31, three large protests were held in Boston, with the total number of protesters being in the thousands. Though all three began peacefully, violence broke out by nightfall, with police driving squad cars through crowds and firing tear gas without dispersal instruction. Some protesters threw plastic water bottles and set off fireworks, while police used pepper spray and batons to keep crowds away from Boston Common. Some stores in Downtown Crossing were damaged and had goods stolen, twenty-one police cruisers were burned or damaged, seven officers were hospitalized (with more being treated for injuries in the streets), and over forty arrests were made.

Protests of at least one hundred people occurred in May and June in Barnstable, Brockton, Lowell, Newton, Springfield, and Taunton. Larger protests, with more than one thousand demonstrators, took place in Boston, Cambridge, Greenfield, Northampton, Quincy, and Worcester.

== Michigan ==
Protests broke out in Detroit on the night of May 29. Some protesters were seen throwing items at police officers and taunting them. At least 61 people were arrested. In Grand Rapids, protests began on May 30 and escalated into incidents of looting and arson, leading to the first riot charges in the history of Kent County. Protests of varying sizes occurred in at least twenty other communities in Michigan.

== Minnesota ==
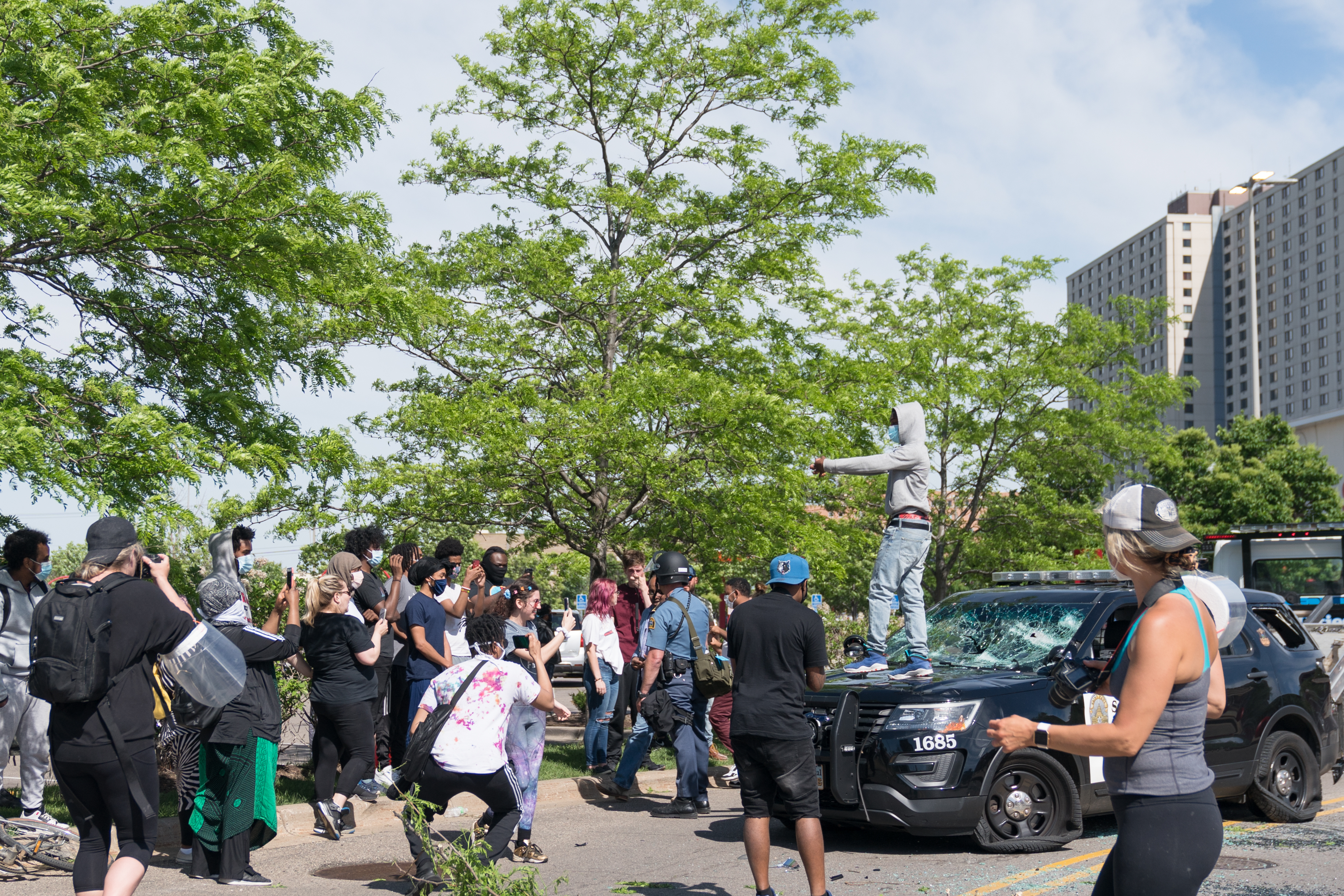
A protester stands on a police car in Saint Paul, Minnesota, May 28

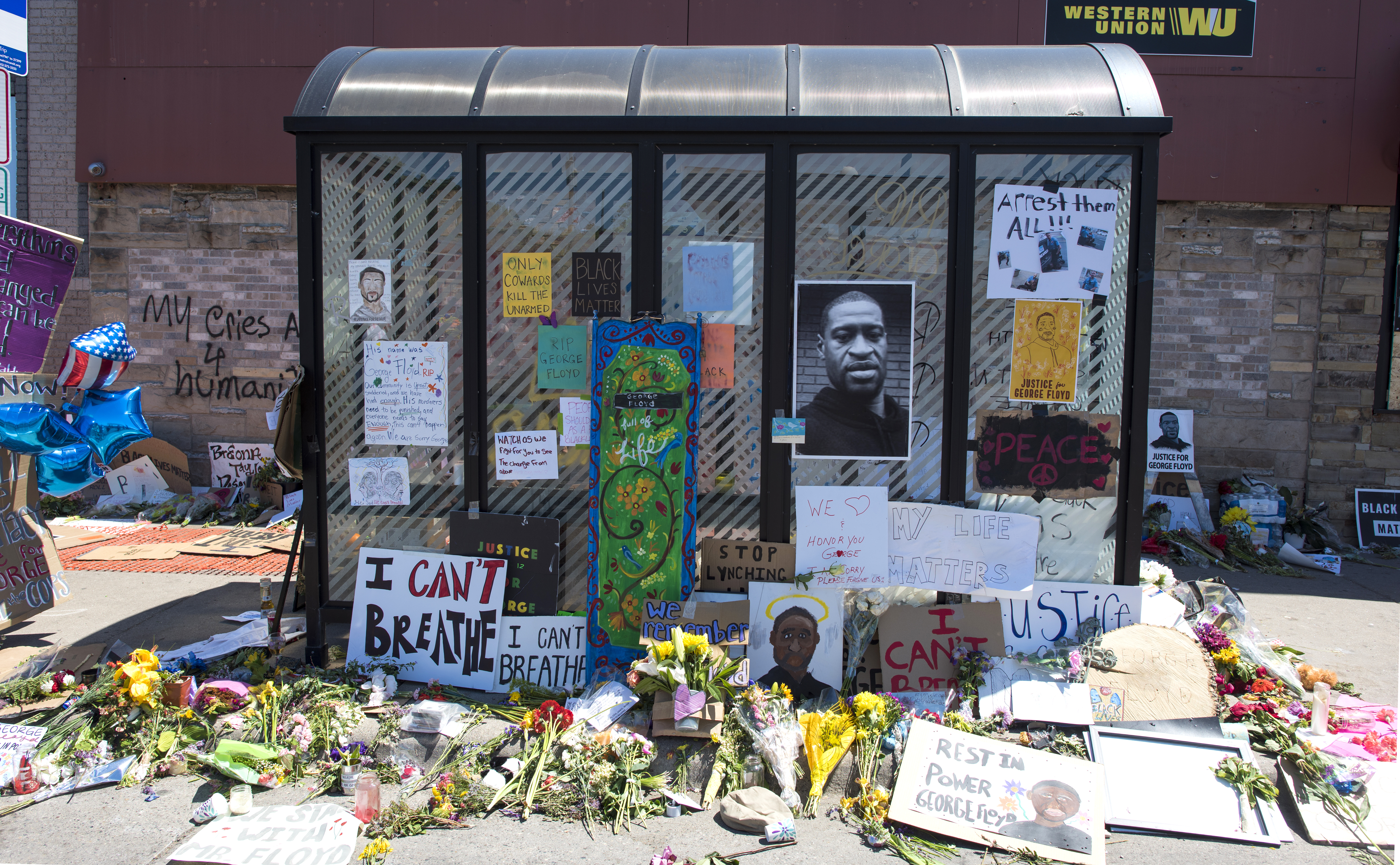
George Floyd Square in Minneapolis, 2020

The murder of George Floyd in Minneapolis led to the first protests there and in neighboring St. Paul, as well as the first protests to result in clashes with police and extensive property damage. Protests continued during the entire month of June. Protests of varying sizes also occurred elsewhere in Minnesota, such as Albert Lea, Austin, Bemidji, Brainerd, Duluth, Ely, Mankato, Owatonna, Rochester, St. Cloud, and Woodbury.

== Mississippi ==
On Friday, May 29, 2020, several people protested at Mississippi State Capitol and walked through downtown Jackson. Protests also occurred in at least nine other communities in Mississippi, including Biloxi, Gulfport, Hattiesburg, Meridian, Oxford, Petal, Starkville, Tupelo, and Vicksburg.

== Missouri ==
On May 29, 2020, dozens of protesters walked from the Country Club Plaza in Kansas City to Westport, where law enforcement officers utilized pepper spray. Protests in Missouri were also held in Cape Girardeau, Columbia, Independence, Joplin, Kirksville, O'Fallon, Rolla, Springfield, St. Charles, and St. Louis.

== Montana ==
On May 31, about 150 people gathered in front of the Montana State Capitol building in Helena to protest the murder of George Floyd. Protests in Montana also took place in at least eight other communities, including Billings, Bozeman, Butte, Great Falls, Havre, Kalispell, Missoula, and Whitefish.

== Nebraska ==
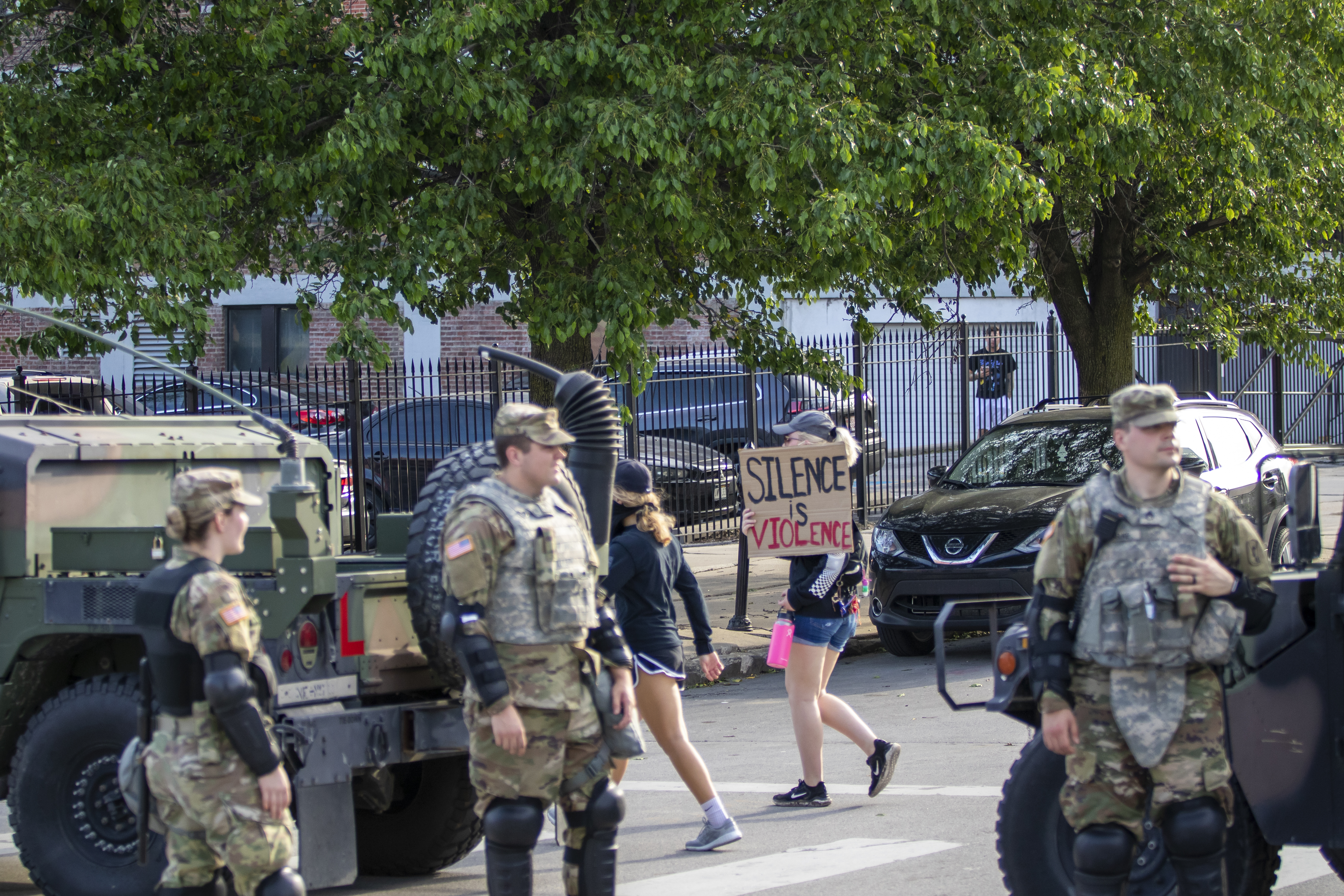
A protester walks past Nebraska Army National Guard in Omaha on June 2

On the evening of May 29, thousands of protesters in Omaha shut down the traffic-heavy 72nd and Dodge Street intersection. Police began firing tear gas on non law abiding protesters at 8:00 pm and made arrests when the crowd failed to disperse. Further violence occurred downtown as several buildings and cruisers were damaged. Tear gas and pepper balls were used by police. Protests in Nebraska were also held in at least eight other communities, including Bellevue, Chadron, Grand Island, Harvard, Kearney, Lincoln, Norfolk, and Scottsbluff.

== Nevada ==
On May 29, 2020, hundreds of protesters gathered on the Las Vegas Strip, leading to the police arresting 80 people, including two journalists. Some protesters threw water bottles and rocks at police. 12 police officers were injured during the gathering. On June 2, the Las Vegas Metropolitan Police announced investigations into two separate shootings involving officers at the 2800 block of Las Vegas Boulevard South and the federal courthouse. Protests also occurred in Boulder City, Carson City, Elko, Fallon, Mesquite, Minden, North Las Vegas, Reno, and Winnemucca.

== New Hampshire ==
On May 30, approximately 800 people rallied in downtown Manchester, beginning their protest at Veterans Park, marching down Elm Street, and ending their march back at the park. Although the protests were peaceful, a tense moment happened at around 1:30 PM when two men in a pickup truck with a blue Trump 2020 flag attached to it drove up to and argued with protesters, with one of the men exiting the truck and brandishing a handgun. Shortly thereafter, the two men—aged 43 and 19—were arrested and charged with felony riot and felony criminal threatening. Protests in New Hampshire were also held in Bristol, Concord, Conway, Dover, Dublin, Hanover, Keene, Nashua, and Peterborough.

== New Jersey ==
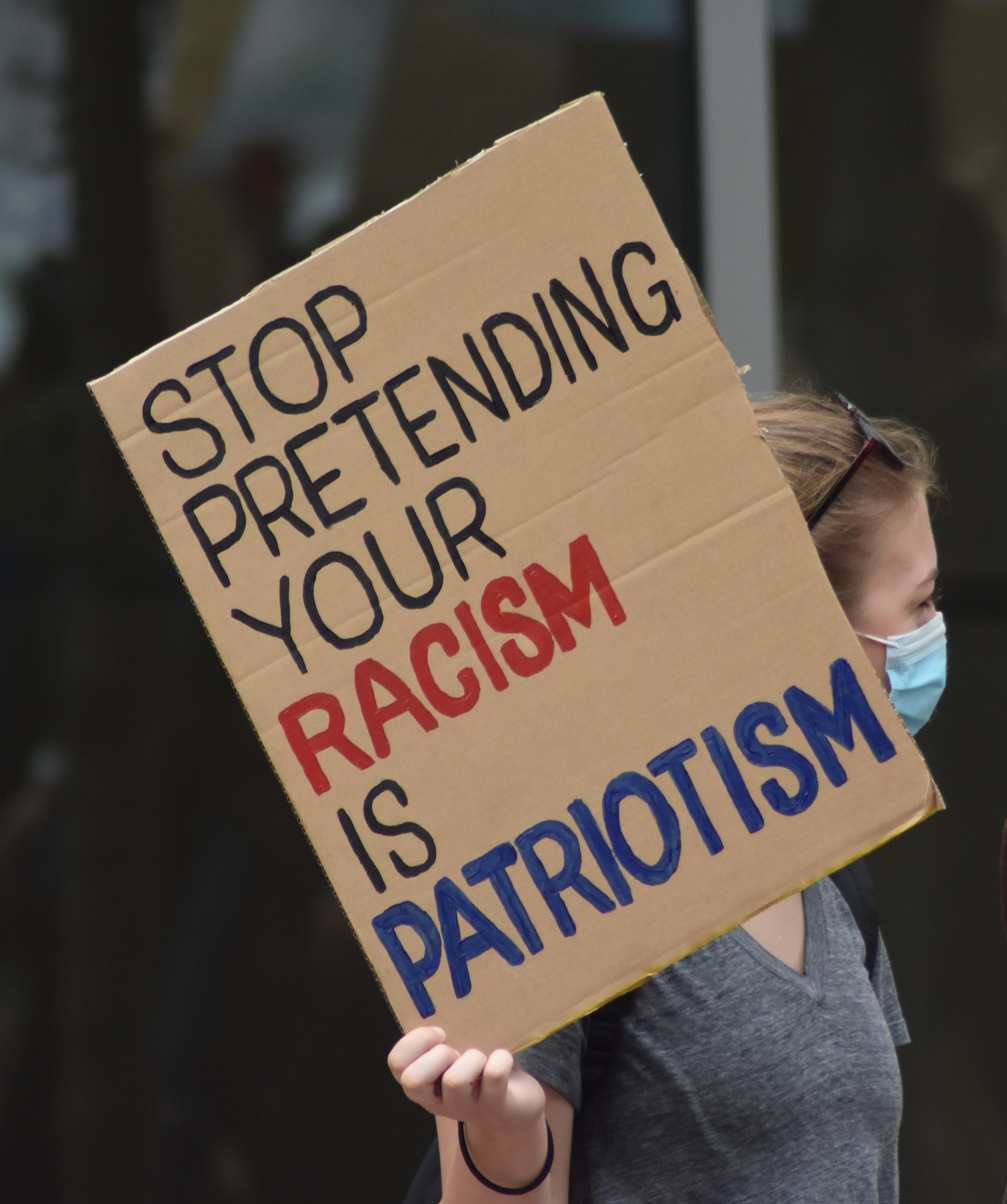
An activist in Hoboken on June 5

Multiple organizations such as Black Lives Matter congregated at the New Jersey Statehouse in Trenton on May 30, 2020. That night, theft took place in Downtown Trenton when businesses were broken into and police vehicles were inflamed or stolen. Protests in New Jersey also took place in more than fifty other communities.

== New Mexico ==
On May 28, hundreds of people protested in Albuquerque, and tear gas was deployed, but no one was injured. Part of the city was shut down. Several shots were fired from a vehicle in the area of Wisconsin and Central, while a female sergeant was approached by several people and had her vehicle damaged. Four people were taken into custody. Protests in New Mexico also occurred in Carlsbad, Clovis, Farmington, Gallup, Las Cruces, Los Alamos, Rio Rancho, Roswell, and Santa Fe.

== New York ==
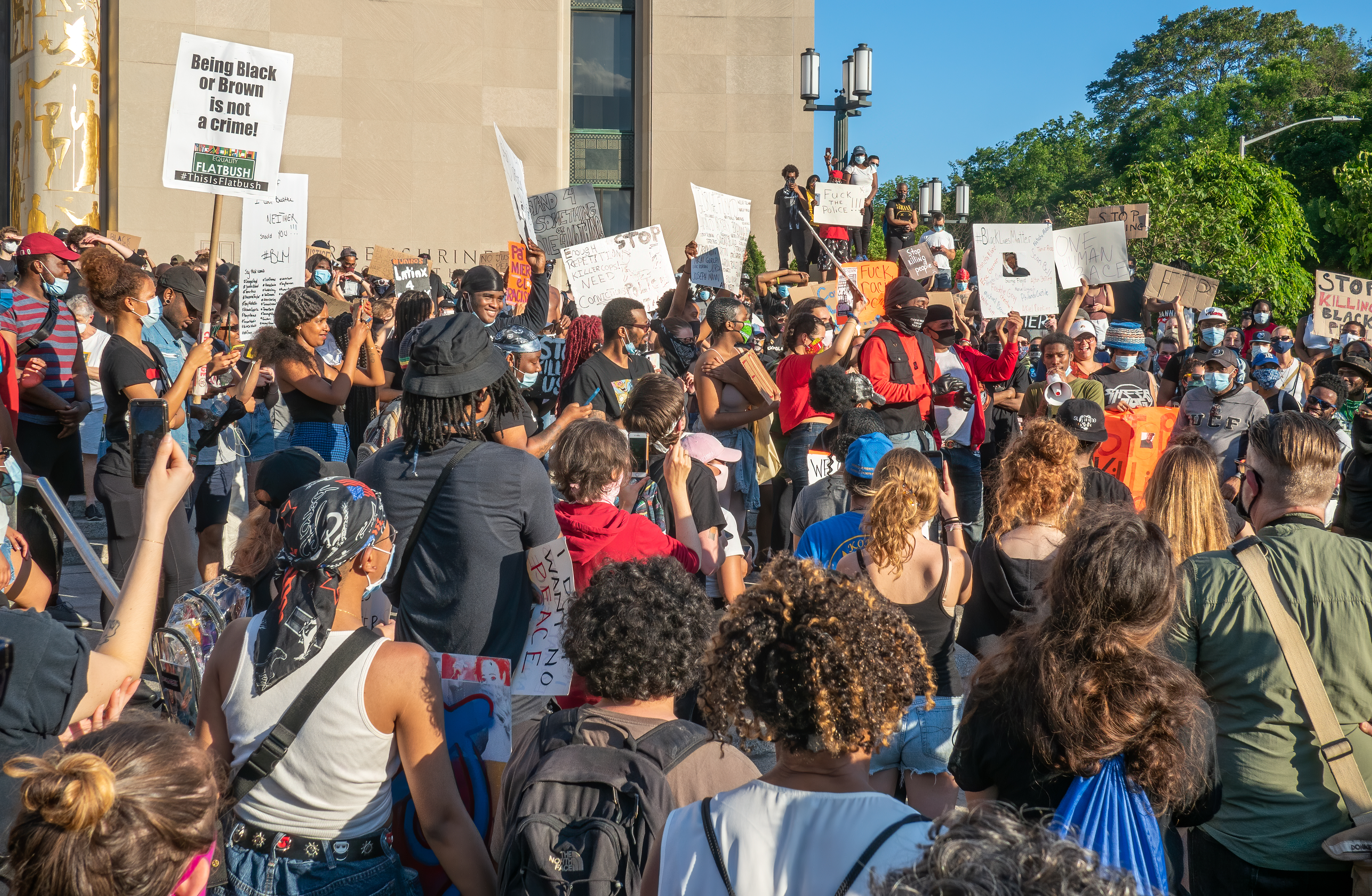
Protest in New York City on May 30

Demonstrations were held in dozens of cities and towns throughout New York beginning on May 28. In New York City, while most events were peaceful, some were marred by violent clashes with police and looting. As a result, and amid the COVID-19 pandemic, the city was put under a curfew starting on June 1. The curfew was moved from up 11:00 pm to 8:00 pm the following day. Fewer arrests were made since the curfew was implemented, apart from forceful policing of even peaceful protests after 8:00. There were several high-profile incidents throughout the protests, including a police vehicle driving through a group of protesters, several instances of excessive force, and widespread looting in the SoHo neighborhood of Manhattan. Several police and protesters were injured, several police were suspended, and thousands of protesters were arrested, mostly on minor charges. District attorneys for Manhattan, Brooklyn, and the Bronx announced plans to decline prosecuting certain low-level offenses.

Smaller protests took place outside New York City. In Buffalo, video footage circulated on the Internet of police shoving an elderly man which caused him to fall to the ground and walk away as he bled from the head. This led to two officer suspensions. On June 6, there was a large number of protests across the North Country, along with dozens of other cities across the country, attracting thousands of local protesters, with all the protests remaining peaceful. At the June 6th protests, the participants all took a knee for nine minutes, in silence, in respect for George Floyd. The period of time was equivalent to about the same amount of time that Derek Chauvin had his knee in Floyd's neck.

== North Carolina ==
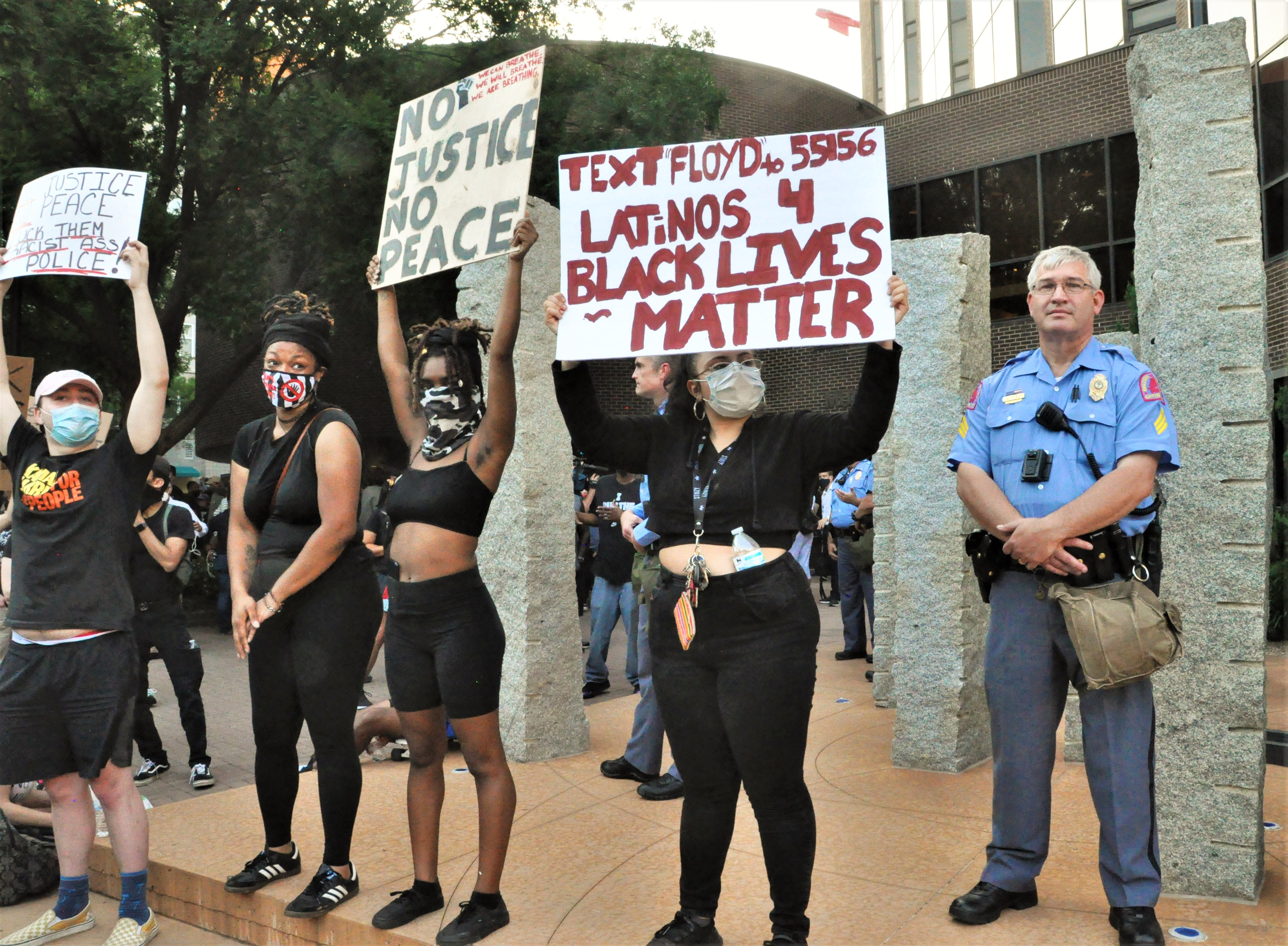
A protest in Raleigh, North Carolina on June 2

On May 30, a protest in Raleigh named "A National Day of Action — Justice for George Floyd, Breonna Taylor, Ahmaud Arbery and lives cut short by Raleigh and Durham police departments," was created. On May 30, protesters in Charlotte blocked traffic on Interstate 277. The police fired tear gas and rubber bullets into the crowds. The city was also placed under a State of Emergency. Protests also occurred in over twenty other communities in North Carolina.

== North Dakota ==
On May 30, Black Lives Matter protesters in Fargo marched from Island Park, City Hall, the 25th St Police Station, and then south on 25th Street. The protests began peacefully but became violent after 6:00 PM. Several businesses in downtown Fargo were damaged including the historic Hotel Donaldson. Protests were also held in at least eight other communities throughout North Dakota, including Bismarck, Dickinson, Grand Forks, Jamestown, Minot, Rugby, Valley City, and Williston.

== Ohio ==
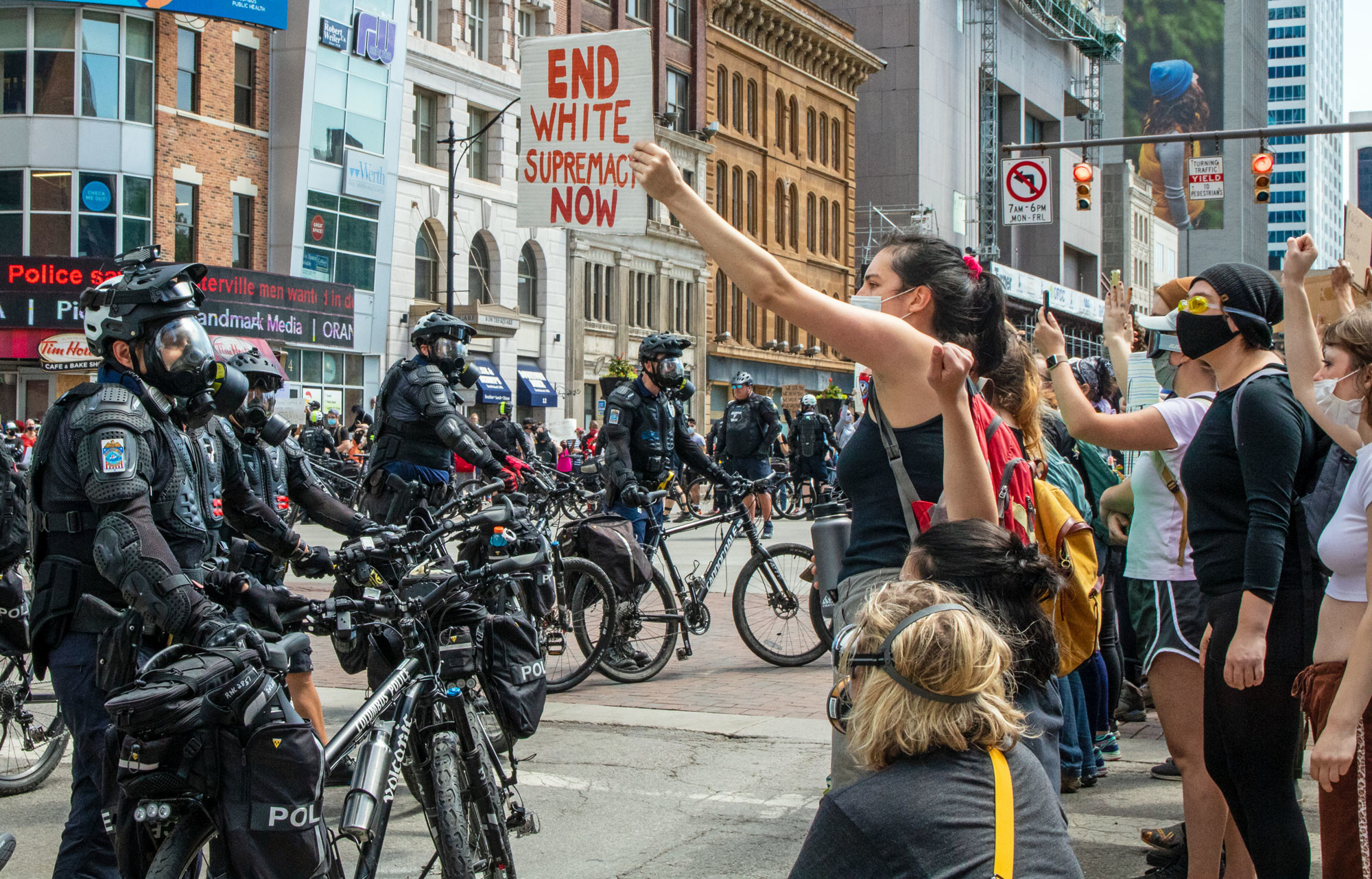
Protests in Columbus, Ohio on May 30

In Ohio, major cities such as Columbus, Cleveland, Cincinnati, Toledo, and Dayton had large protests, as well as numerous smaller cities and small towns including the jurisdictions Bay Village, Brecksville, Centerville, and Chagrin Falls. As a result of rioting and looting, a number of cities such as Cleveland, Columbus, Dayton, Cincinnati, Toledo, and Springfield imposed curfews of varying times.

== Oklahoma ==
On May 30, protesters gathered near downtown Oklahoma City at 7:30 pm to rally against the murder of Floyd. Although the event began peacefully, it grew violent as reports of looting and vandalism were made. On May 31, another violent protest was held outside the Oklahoma City Police Department. Mayor David Holt set a 10:00 p.m. curfew. Protests also took place in at least eleven other communities in Oklahoma, including Ardmore, Bartlesville, Broken Arrow, Edmond, Enid, Lawton, Norman, Muskogee, Stillwater, Claremore, and Tulsa.

== Oregon ==
Over two hundred people walked the perimeter of the Oregon State Capitol Building in Salem on May 30, 2020. A law enforcement spokesperson stated that the reason for using tear gas to disperse the protest was objects and "explosive devices" that were thrown. Protests continued in Portland daily for over three months.

== Pennsylvania ==
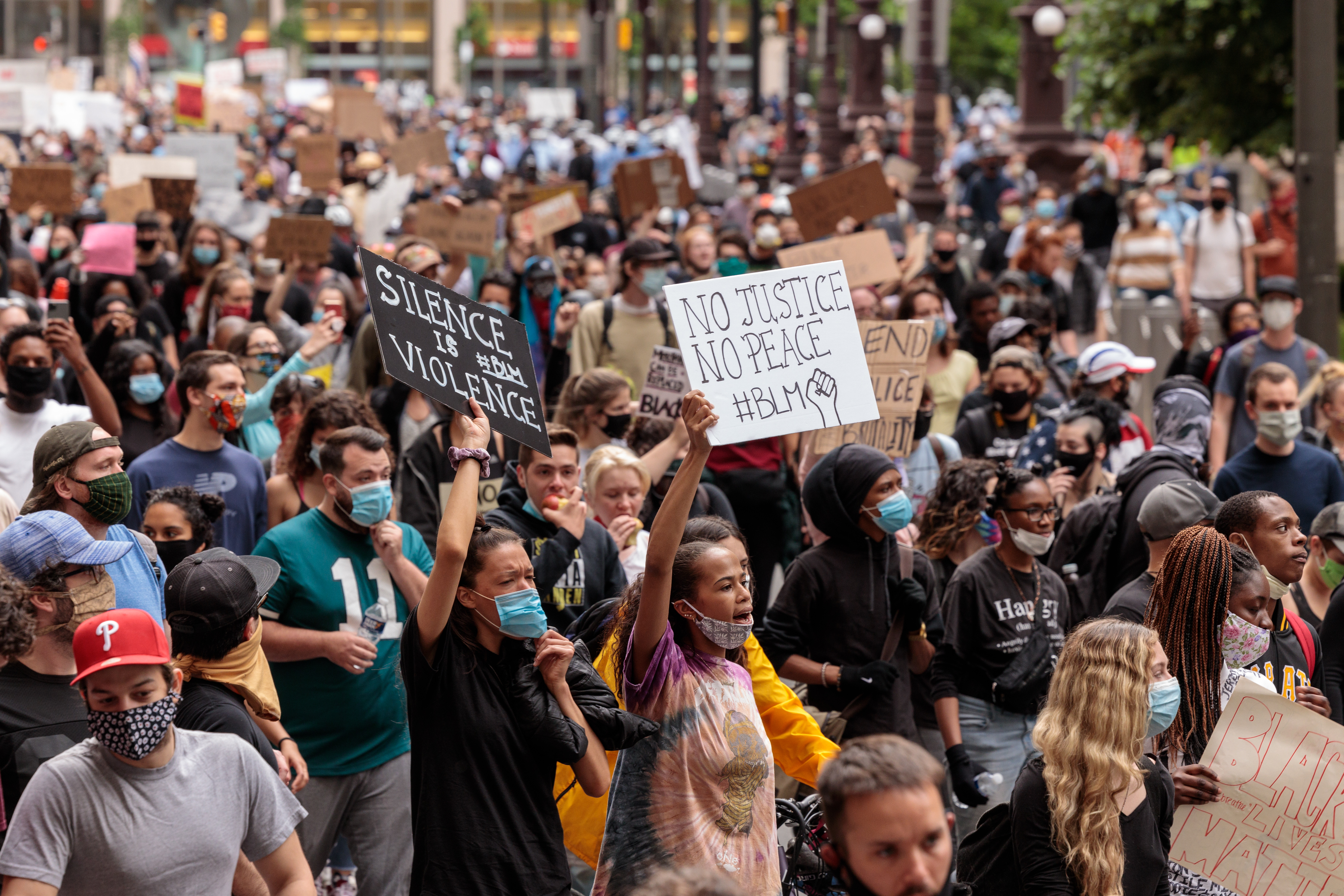
Protesters in Philadelphia on June 2

Protests were held in over 40 cities in Pennsylvania. The largest protests were in Philadelphia and Pittsburgh, which each saw thousands of protesters marching on May 30. Both cities continued to experience protests into the following week.

== Rhode Island ==
On May 30, nearly 1,000 people protested at the State House lawn in Providence at a peaceful rally organized by Black Lives Matter Rhode Island. Later that night the building was vandalized. On June 1, at least 65 people were taken into custody after a police car was set on fire and several stores, including the Providence Place Mall, were looted. Protests occurred in at least ten other communities in Rhode Island, including Bristol, Burrillville, Jamestown, Narragansett, New Shoreham, Newport, North Kingstown, South Kingstown, Westerly, and Woonsocket.

== South Carolina ==
On May 30, 2020, people walked from South Carolina Statehouse in Columbia to Columbia police station.

Protests in South Carolina occurred in at least nine other communities throughout South Carolina, including Anderson, Charleston, Florence, Fort Mill, Greenville, Myrtle Beach, North Charleston, Rock Hill, and Sumter.

== South Dakota ==
A protest march was held in downtown Sioux Falls on May 31, ending outside the Sioux Falls and Minnehaha County Law Enforcement Center. George Floyd's uncle spoke about the beautiful protest and thanked the protesters for honoring his nephew. The event organizers for the downtown event emphasized nonviolence to honor George Floyd. However, some protesters later traveled to Sioux Empire Mall, and began to throw rocks and break windows. Some protesters asked the rock throwers to stop and even formed a line in front of the police to quell the actions against police, but without success. Gov. Kristi Noem declared a state of emergency, from 10pm on May 31, to 7am on June 1. Seventy members of the National Guard were activated. SWAT and National Guard teams then assisted in enforcing curfew, but rioting and looting continued at the mall and other nearby stores. Protests occurred in at least eight other communities in South Dakota, including Aberdeen, Brookings, Huron, Mitchell, Pierre, Pine Ridge, Rapid City, and Watertown.

== Tennessee ==
Hundreds of people gathered at a demonstration on May 30 in Nashville, peacefully demonstrating followed by a march to a police department. On June 12, protesters declared the Nashville Autonomous Zone. Protests also took place in at least nine other communities in Tennessee, including Bristol, Chattanooga, Clarksville, Cleveland, Jackson, Knoxville, Memphis, Morristown, and Murfreesboro.

== Texas ==
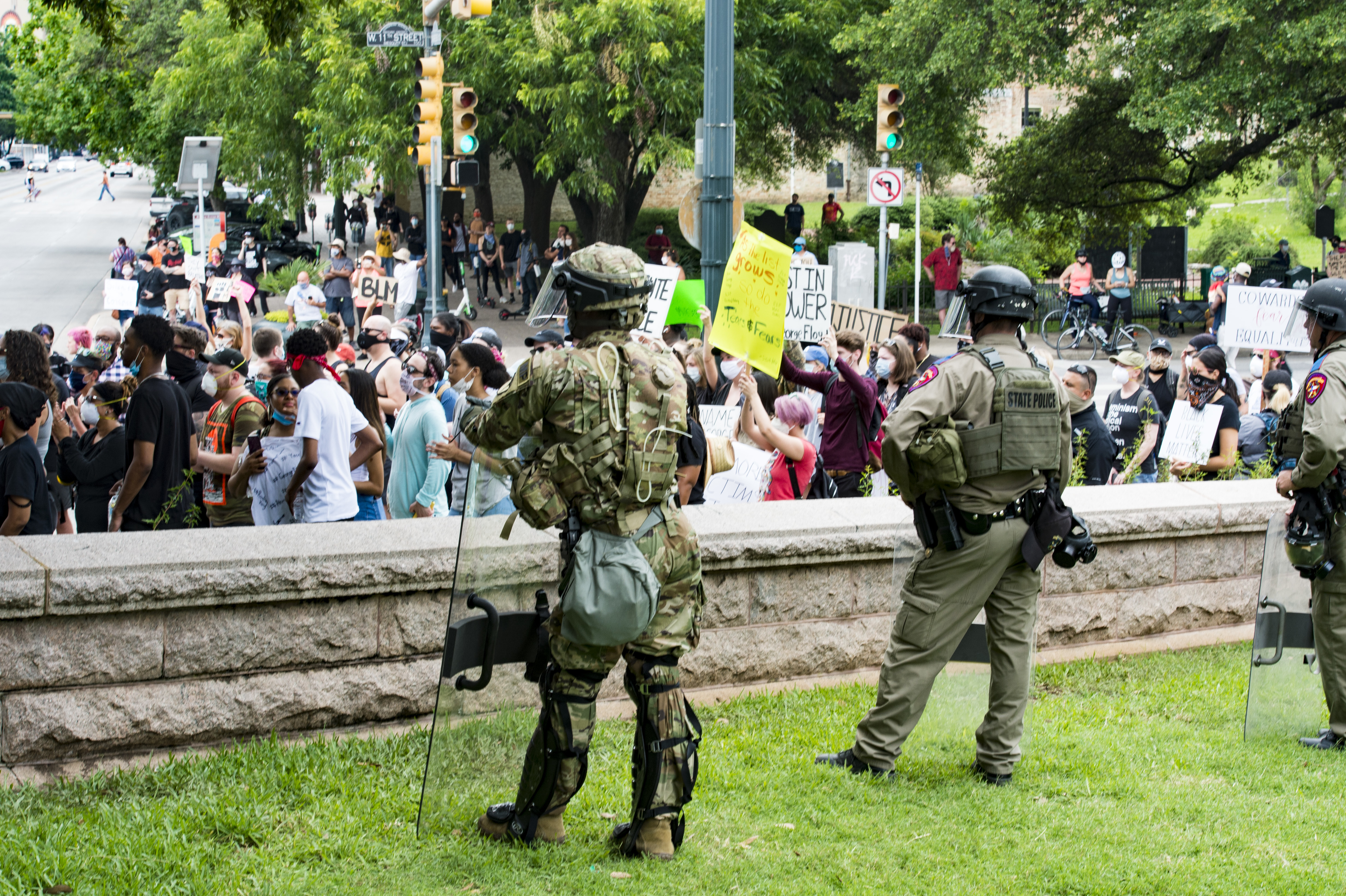
Texas Army National Guard and police stand guard during a protest in Austin, Texas on May 31

Protests were held in at least 41 towns and cities throughout Texas, with major protests in Dallas, Austin and Houston. In George Floyd's hometown of Houston, family members joined a march on June 2, estimated to be 60,000 strong; a video appeared to show a female protester in Houston being trampled by a police officer on a horse. In Dallas, a man with a machete was beaten to near death by protesters after he entered the area to supposedly protect the neighborhood.

== Utah ==
On May 29, between one hundred and two hundred protesters congregated downtown at 900 South and State Street in Salt Lake City. On May 30, protests in downtown Salt Lake City became violent as protesters destroyed an SLCPD cruiser and vandalized the Capitol Building. In response, Governor Gary Herbert activated the National Guard to quell the riots.

Protests were also held in at least nine other communities throughout Utah, including Cedar City, Cottonwood Heights, Logan, Moab, Ogden, Park City, Provo, Saint George, and Tooele.

== Vermont ==
On May 30, around 1,200 people in Burlington protested in Battery Park and moved toward the Burlington Police Department. There was a report by the police chief of vandalism against the BPD station. Protests also occurred in at least nine other communities in Vermont, including Bellows Falls, Brattleboro, Essex Junction, Middlebury, Montpelier, Newport, Rutland, St. Albans, and St. Johnsbury.

== Virginia ==
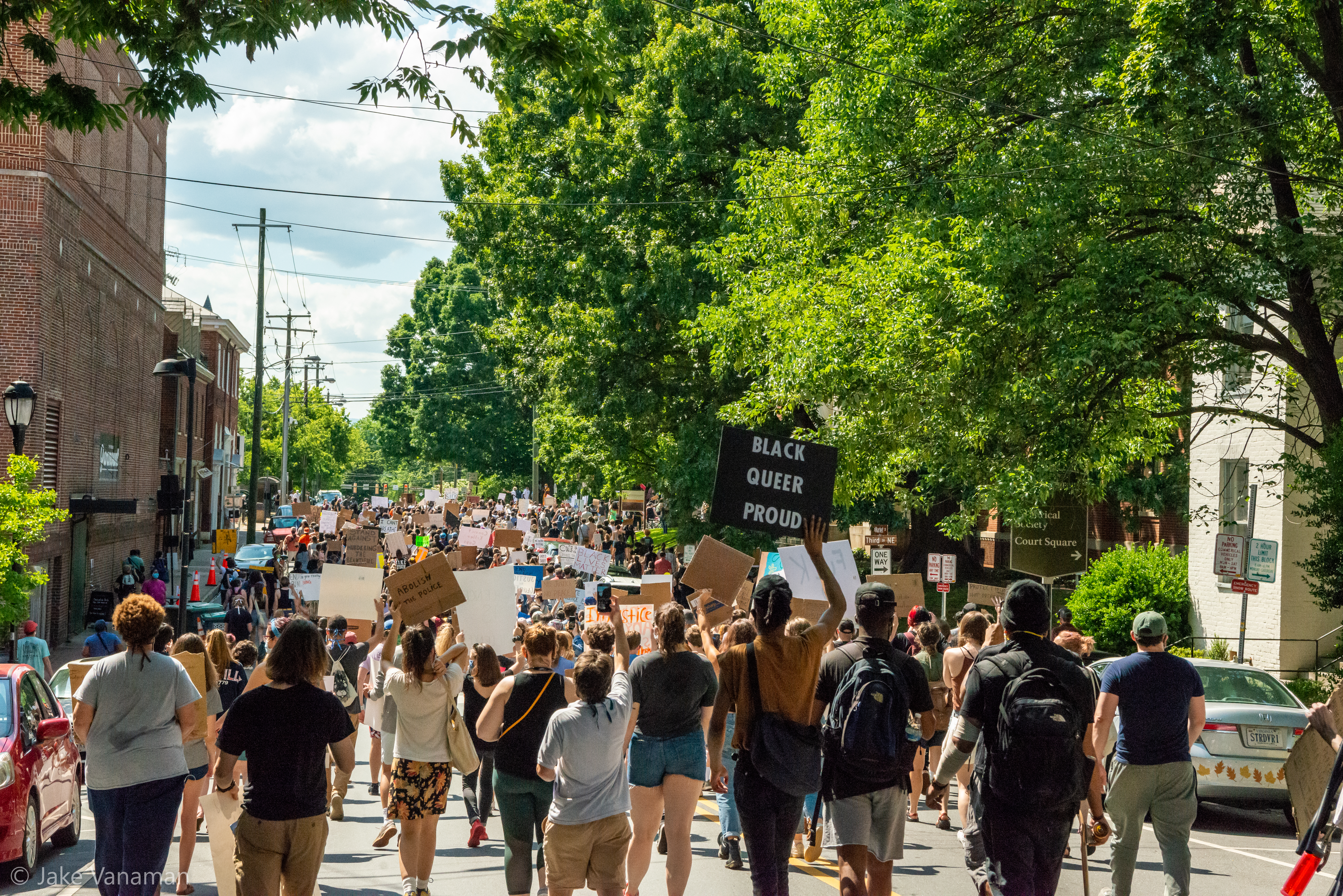
Demonstration in Charlottesville, Virginia on May 30

At least 50 cities in Virginia reported protests and demonstrations beginning May 28. In Richmond, there were major protests since May 28, with clashes with police, defacing of Confederate monuments and a curfew declared on May 31, with tear gas being used by the police on demonstrators on June 1. Several Confederate statues were damaged or torn down, with protesters also tearing down a statue of Christopher Columbus on June 9.

== Washington ==
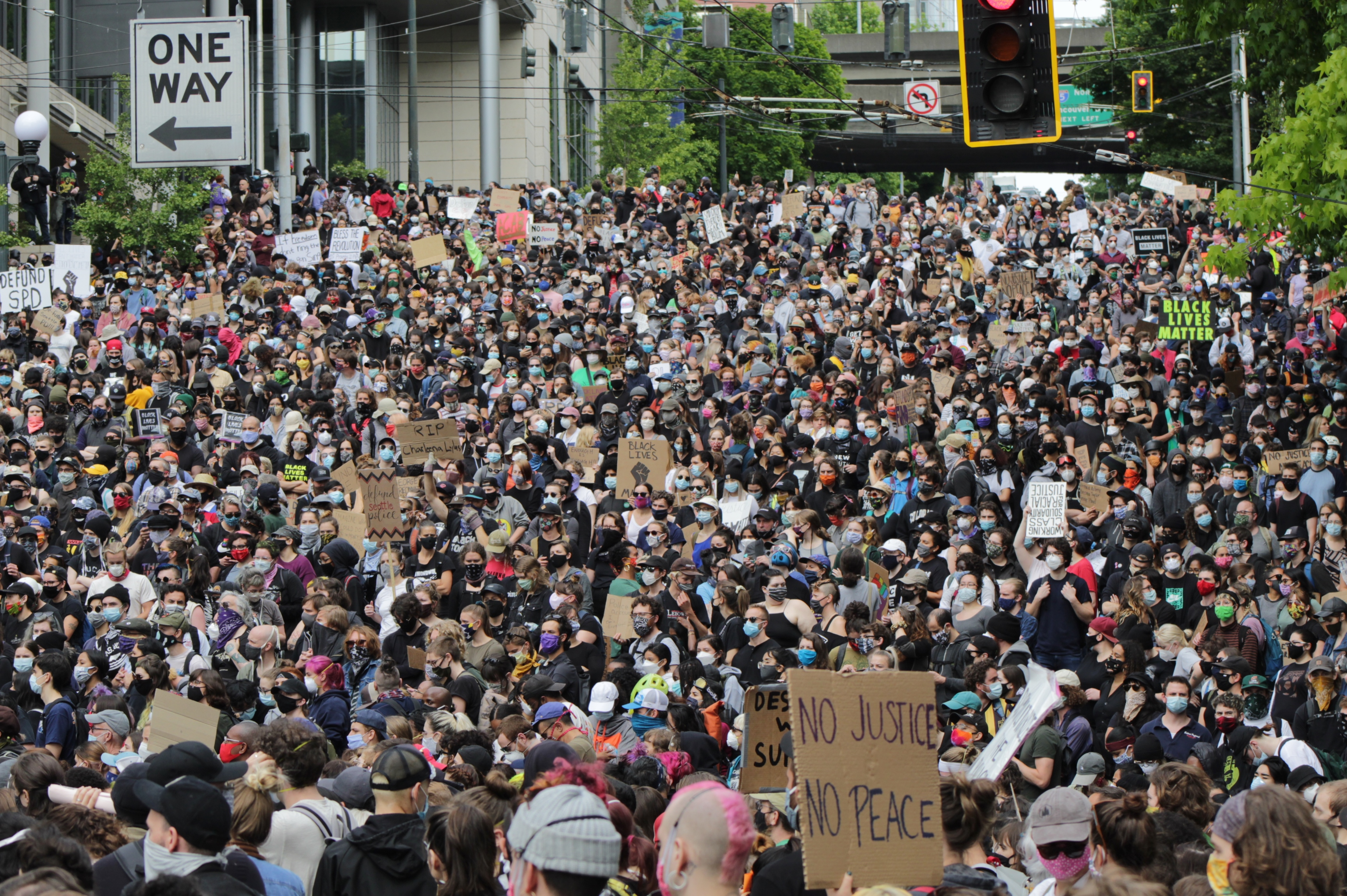
Protesters in front of the Seattle City Hall on June 3

Protests occurred throughout Washington state and in the communities surrounding Puget Sound, with at least 30 towns and cities seeing protests. Major protests were held in Tacoma, Spokane (which saw 1,000 people march on May 31) and Seattle. Seattle saw major protests, and as of June 8 protests had continued for 11 straight days. This includes a demonstration of thousands on the weekend of May 30. Looting and rioting occurred that evening, and continued clashes with police on May 31 and June 6, with police use of tear gas despite a mayoral ban on the use of tear gas announced on June 5. On June 8, the police withdrew from the East Precinct on Capitol Hill, leading to protesters declaring the 6 blocks surrounding the precinct the Capitol Hill Autonomous Zone.

On July 19, 2020, a peaceful protest in downtown Seattle turned violent and saw numerous buildings vandalized. On July 22, 2020, 150 protesters who gathered in the Capitol Hill neighborhood burned and looted several businesses. On July 25, 2020, an event which started as a peaceful protest turned into a riot which resulted in more Seattle businesses along 12th Avenue vandalized and areas at a future juvenile detention center were set ablaze and vandalized as well.

== West Virginia ==
On May 30, a group of protesters marched around the West Virginia State Capitol complex in Charleston. On May 31, hundreds of people protested police brutality outside of Charleston City Hall and the Charleston Police Department. Protests also occurred in at least eight other communities in West Virginia, including Beckley, Clarksburg, Fairmont, Huntington, Morgantown, Parkersburg, Weirton, and Wheeling.

== Wisconsin ==
On May 30, 2020, there was a peaceful protest at the State Capitol in Madison with close to 1,000 people. Later, the demonstration turned into a riot with storefronts being vandalized, and conflict with law enforcement met with tear gas. Protests were also held in at least nine other communities in Wisconsin, including Appleton, Eau Claire, Franklin, Green Bay, Kenosha, La Crosse, Marinette, McFarland, Milwaukee, and Wausau.

== Wyoming ==
On May 29, about 125 protesters attended a candlelight vigil near the steps of the Wyoming State Capitol in Cheyenne. Peaceful protests were also held in Cheyenne on May 30 and May 31. The nightly protests in Laramie were held for three weeks; the largest of these attracted an estimated 1,000 protesters. Protests occurred in at least seven other communities in Wyoming, including Casper, Cody, Gillette, Jackson, Riverton, Rock Springs, and Sheridan.

== U.S. territories ==
=== American Samoa ===
- Utulei: Around 100 people marched silently from Fatumafuti to Utulei Beach Park, despite stormy weather, in solidarity with Black Lives Matter. Speeches about racism and police brutality were made.

=== Guam ===
- Hagåtña: Over 100 people protested peacefully at the Chief Kepuha statue.
- Tamuning: About 125 people protested peacefully at the ITC intersection.

=== Northern Mariana Islands ===
- Saipan: One person protested for two hours on Beach Road across Atkins Kroll in Oleai. After stating that she planned to protest there for an hour in the morning every day for the week, a dozen more people joined her the next day in her peaceful protest.

=== Puerto Rico ===
- Loíza: Hundreds gathered for a vigil on June 1.
- San Juan: Over 200 people protested in San Juan on June 2. Police officers used pepper spray on the protesters.

=== U.S. Virgin Islands ===
- Charlotte Amalie: On June 6, over 1,000 protesters marched and observed nine minutes of silence.
- Christiansted: June 7: A crowd of 50 to 60 adults and children stood in silence for 8 minutes 46 seconds at the Lagoon in Gallows Bay.
- Frederiksted: A motorcade was held and a childhood friend of Floyd's spoke at a protest on June 4.

== See also ==
- 2020–2021 United States racial unrest
- George Floyd protests
- List of George Floyd protests outside the United States
- Murder of George Floyd
- King assassination riots
