= Colin Eisler =

German art historian

Colin Tobias Eisler is a German-born American art historian. He is the Robert Lehman Professor of Fine Arts at New York University's Institute of Fine Arts, and a widely published expert on early Netherlandish art.

== Biography ==
Eisler was born in Hamburg, Germany, in 1931. His family subsequently moved to the United States, where Eisler received his undergraduate degree from Yale University in 1952. He studied at Oxford from 1952 to 1953, then completed his master's degree at Harvard University the following year. He was hired to teach art history at Yale from 1955 to 1957 while he was working on his doctorate. Eisler received his PhD from Harvard in 1957, and spent the following year as a Fellow at the Institute for Advanced Study in Princeton, New Jersey. He has taught at New York University since 1958.

On June 23, 1961, he married Benita Eisler, née Blitzer (b. 1937), a literary scholar and biographer. Together, they have one daughter.

His research and writing have been furthered by many grants and awards, including a Guggenheim Fellowship, a National Endowment for the Humanities Senior Fellowship, and a Henry Fellowship at Magdalen College, Oxford. He was the recipient of a festschrift for his 80th birthday in 2011, when his colleagues published New Studies on Old Masters: Essays in Renaissance Art in Honour of Colin Eisler.

== Selected works ==
- 1963. German Drawings from the 16th Century to the Expressionists. New York: Shorewood. ISBN 978-3770125241
- 1975. The Seeing Hand: A Treasury of Great Master Drawings. Harper & Row. ISBN 978-0060111434
- 1988. Cats Know Best. Illustrator: Lesley Anne Ivory. Dial Press. ISBN 978-0803705036
- 1989. The Genius of Jacopo Bellini. New York: Harry N. Abrams. ISBN 978-0810907270
- 1991. Durer's Animals. Washington: Smithsonian Institution Press. ISBN 978-0874744088
- 1992. David's Songs: His Psalms and Their Story. Illustrator: Jerry Pinkney. Dial Press. ISBN 978-0803710580
- 1995. Paintings in the Hermitage. Stewart, Tabori and Chang. ISBN 978-1556704192
- 1996. Masterworks in Berlin: A City's Paintings Reunited. Boston: Little, Brown and Company. ISBN 978-0821219515
- 2003. Early Netherlandish Painting: The Thyssen-Bornemisza Collection. Philip Wilson Publishers. ISBN 978-0856673535
- 2012. Flemish And Dutch Drawings From The Fifteenth To The Eighteenth Century: Drawings Of The Masters. Literary Licensing, Inc. ISBN 978-1258433710
