= Jonathan Janz =

American writer (born 1973)

- Born: October 27, 1973 (age 53); Colorado Springs, Colorado, U.S.
- Occupations: Author, teacher
- Children: 3
- Writing career
- Period: 2010–present
- Genres: Horror; supernatural; thriller; post-apocalyptic; gothic
- Website: jonathanjanz.com

Jonathan Janz (born October 27, 1973) is the pen name of Craig Shaeffer, an American horror author of multiple novels.

== Early life ==
Jonathan Craig Shaeffer grew up in Colorado Springs, Colorado. He was raised by his mother near a graveyard, where she would check out books on albums from the library. Early influences during this time include The Twilight Zone, In Search Of..., the works of Edgar Allan Poe, as well as the audio version of The Signal-Man by Charles Dickens. During childhood, he was prone to sleepwalking, and describes a time when he woke up in a pitch-black room of a friend's house, navigating his way through a maze of boxes because the family had just moved in. He adopted the pseudonym of Jonathan Janz as a way of honoring his maternal grandparents, who helped to raise him.

== Career ==
In 2011, Janz published his debut novel, The Sorrows. The book received praise from author Brian Keene, who called it "the best horror novel of 2012." Keene would also describe Janz as "One of the best writers in modern horror to come along in the last decade."

Between 2011 and 2016, eight of Janz's novels were released by Samhain Publishing. After this, Janz signed a deal with Flame Tree Publishing, which published four more novels as well as reprintings of his earlier works. Other novels have been released through Sinister Grin Press, Earthling Publications, and Cemetery Dance.

His manager, Ryan Lewis, also works with Josh Malerman.

Janz cites multiple influences on his career, including Stephen King, Joe R. Lansdale, Brian Keene, Richard Matheson, among many others.

In March of 2023, Janz won the Wilburn-Thomas Award at the Scares That Care event in Williamsburg, Virginia. This is a charity event organized by author Brian Keene and the award is given to authors who have helped other writers and their community.

== Personal life ==
Jonathan Janz is the pen name for Craig Shaeffer. Janz teaches high school English, film literature, and creative writing at West Lafayette Junior-Senior High School. He currently resides in Indiana with his wife and three children.

== Novels ==
Year	Title	Publisher	Pages	Notes
2011	The Sorrows	Samhain Publishing	272	
2012	House of Skin	Samhain Publishing	312	
2013	The Darkest Lullaby	Samhain Publishing	272	
2013	Savage Species	Samhain Publishing	315	Originally published as a 5 part eBook
2013	Bloodshot: Kingdom of Shadows	Kindle Direct Publishing	187	Out of Print; Originally published as an eBook
2014	Dust Devils	Samhain Publishing	280	
2014	Castle of Sorrows	Samhain Publishing	337	Sequel to The Sorrows
2015	The Nightmare Girl	Samhain Publishing	304	
2015	Wolf Land	Samhain Publishing	314	
2016	Children of the Dark	Sinister Grin Press	392	Booklist Top Ten Horror Book of the Year for 2016; Re-published in a revised edition by Cemetery Dance Publications in 2023
2017	Exorcist Falls	Sinister Grin Press	458	Contains the novella Exorcist Road
2018	The Siren and the Specter	Flame Tree Publishing	295	Goodreads Choice Awards nominee for Best Horror 2018
2019	The Dark Game	Flame Tree Publishing	352	Library Journal Best Horror of 2019
2020	The Raven	Flame Tree Publishing	245	The Raven, Book One
2022	Blood Country	Flame Tree Publishing	320	The Raven, Book Two
2022	Marla	Earthling Publications	288	Initially published by Earthling and limited to 500 copies; Mass publication in 2026 by Weird Tales Presents & Blackstone Publishing
2022	The Dismembered	Cemetery Dance Publications	178	
2024	Children of the Dark 2: The Night Flyers	Cemetery Dance Publications	396	Sequel to Children of the Dark
2025	Veil	Blackstone Publishing	360	

== Collections ==
Year	Title	Publisher	Pages	Notes
2018	Tales From the Shadow Side	Thunderstorm Books	263	Limited to 60 copies. Includes excepts from an unreleased novel, Garden of Snakes. Re-published in 2019 in a 350 limited edition run, excluding the excerpt from the unreleased novel.

== Short Fiction ==
Title	Type	Originally published in	Collected in	Notes
"Witching Hour Theatre"	novella	Kindle Direct Publishing (July 2005)	Tales From the Shadow Side (2019)	Originally published as an eBook
"Old Order"	novella	Kindle Direct Publishing (September 2010)	Tales From the Shadow Side (2019)	Originally published as an eBook
"The Clearing of Travis Coble"	short story	Kindle Direct Publishing (March 2013)	Tales From the Shadow Side (2019)	Originally published as an eBook
"Throwing Monsters"	short story	Piercing the Darkness (February 2014)	Tales From the Shadow Side (2019)	
"Exorcist Road"	novella	Kindle Direct Publishing (September 2014)	Appears revised in the paperback edition of Exorcist Falls (2017)	Originally published as an eBook
"A Southern Evening"	short story	LampLight Vol. 4, Issue 4 (June 2016)	Tales From the Shadow Side (2019)	
"Vanilla Sunshine"	short story	Clickers Forever: A Tribute to J.F. Gonzalez (February 2018)	-	Set in the world of J.F. Gonzalez's Clickers
"Titan, Tyger"	short story	Lost Highways: Dark Fictions From the Road (July 2018)	-	
"Night and Day and In Between"	short story	Welcome to the Show (August 2018)	-	
"The Kiss of Diana Antonov"	novella	Leaders of the Pack: A Werewolf Anthology (January 2020)	-	
"Room For the Night"	short story	Close to Midnight (October 2022)	-	
"The Humpers at the Threshold"	short story	The Drive-In: Multiplex (Fall 2023)	-	Set in the world of Joe R. Lansdale's The Drive-In
"Midwinter Tales"	short story	Literally Dead: Tales of Holiday Hauntings (October 2023)	-	
"Dobrogost"	short story	Swords in the Shadows: An Anthology (October 2023)	-	
"The Third Shannon"	short story	Morbidologies (October 2023)	-	
"The Drolls"	short story	Fear of Clowns: A Horror Anthology (September 2024)	-	
"Stretch-Neck"	short story	Stretch-Neck: A VEIL Story chapbook (Summer 2025)	-	Set in the world of his novel Veil that was sent to recipients of his newsletter and those who pre-ordered the book
"Lenora"	short story	The End of the World As We Know It: Tales of Stephen King's The Stand (August 2025)	-	Set in the world of Stephen King's The Stand
"Moonflowers"	short story	Marla Weird Tales edition (August 2026)	-	Set in the world of his novel Marla
"Follower™ "	short story	KingCon 2026 Program Book (October 2026)	-	
"Take a Puzzle, Leave a Puzzle"	short story	Take a Puzzle, Leave a Puzzle chapbook (November 2026)	-	

== Non-Fiction ==
Title	Type	Originally published in	Collected in	Notes
"Treating Fiction Like a Relationship"	essay	Writers on Writing, Vol. 3 (April 2016)	-	Originally published as an eBook
"Elizabeth: An Unnaturally Forgotten Novel"	essay	Elizabeth by Ken Greenhall, Valancourt Books edition (April 2017)	-	
"Introduction"	introduction	Midnight in the Graveyard (October 2019)	-	
"They Come and They Go: An Introduction to Stephen Kozeniewski's Hunter of the Dead"	introduction	Hunter of the Dead by Stephen Kozeniewski (November 2022)	-	
"Introduction: Step Into the Spinning Tunnel"	introduction	Illusions of Isolation (February 2023)	-	
"Introduction"	introduction	The Cry Room by Kathe Koja (April 2026)	-	
"IT and Stranger Things: A Shadow Cast By Love"	essay	Still Floating: 40 Years of Pennywise (September 2026)	-	
