= Lesley Anne Ivory =

British writer and painter (born 1934)

Lesley Anne Ivory (née Lesley Anne Revill; born 1934) is a British painter who generally paints cats, and is best known for her "Ivory Cats". She has illustrated more than 40 children's books.

She was born Lesley Anne Revill in 1934 in Luton, Bedfordshire, UK. Her father was a dental surgeon and her mother a textile designer. She attended St. Alban's School of Art, specialising in fabric design and wood engraving.

Ivory rose to fame in the 1980s, following time spent developing her illustrative abilities with many freelance commissions. It is her 'Ivory Cats' with highly detailed studies of cats on rich and decorative backgrounds that have made her work popular on merchandise for nearly three decades, from plates, greeting cards, kitchenware through to wristwatches, fine china and wall calendars. She has taken part in exhibitions, including three one-woman shows in London, annual shows at the Chris Beetles Gallery in London and at Salisbury Museum in Wiltshire. In 1993, Ivory had a major exhibition in New York. Her wood engravings were exhibited at the Summer Exhibition of the Royal Academy for a consecutive decade. She also created a set of limited edition prints of animals for the World Wildlife Fund. She is also one of the patrons of the UK-based Cat Action Trust.

The range of merchandise featuring the Ivory Cats is extensive and includes hundreds of items from the US, UK and Europe in addition to being an expanding market in Japan. It has appeared on merchandise from Danbury Mint, Hunky Dory, Enesco, Past Times, and many others. Today Ivory's work can be seen on Flame Tree calendars, Halcyon Days boxes, and Wentworth Wooden Jigsaws. Her work is exhibited at the Chris Beetles Gallery.

In 2015, Ivory commissioned her first website. Ivory and her husband, artist Evan Ivory, live in Hertfordshire, England. The Ivorys have two sons and two grand-daughters.

== Books written ==
Ivory has written many books.

- 1988: Cats Know Best. (written by Colin Eisler)
- 1988: Kittens – Pop-up book
- 1989: Meet my Cats
- 1989: PostCats
- 1990: Tiny Kittens – Pop-up book
- 1991: Little Angels – Pop-up book
- 1991: Cats in the Sun
- 1992: Book of Cats
- 1992: Collectable Cats
- 1992: Perfect Little Cats
- 1992: Glorious Cats
- 1993: The Birthday Cat
- 1995: Cat and Carols
- 1995: Cats Amongst the Toys
- 1991: Christmas Cats
- 1998: Star Cats: A Feline Zodiac
- 2001: Cats
- 2007: Home is Where the Cat Is
