= Spring Fair =

Spring Fair is organised by Hyve Group. Spring Fair is a retail trade exhibition held each February at the National Exhibition Centre (NEC), near Birmingham, UK. Spring Fair began in 1950 but was first held at the NEC in 1976 and was opened by Queen Elizabeth II. 2008 visitor figures exceeded 70,000 (ABC Certified). It occupies all 20 halls of the NEC and is the largest home and gift fair in the UK. Hyve Group also organises Autumn Fair for home and gift buyers in September and Glee, the UK's leading garden and outdoor living trade fair.
