= Granville Christian Academy =

School in Granville, Ohio

Coordinates: 40°03′38″N 82°29′19″W

Granville Christian Academy is a private Christian school at 1820 Newark Granville Rd, Granville, Ohio. GCA educates students from kindergarten through 12th grade. It is a college prep private school. The school colors are purple and white, its mascot is the lion.

== Athletics ==
GCA is a member of the Mid-Ohio Christian Athletic League (MOCAL), Central Ohio Athletic League (COAL), and the Ohio High School Athletic Association (OHSAA).

GCA supports the following sports

- Boys Soccer
- Boys Basketball
- Boys Baseball
- Girls Volleyball
- Girls Basketball
- Girls Softball
- Cross Country
- Track and Field
- Golf

GCA has won several ACSI Ohio Valley State Championships. Most recently in Boys Varsity Soccer (2007 and 2008 State Championships). In addition, the Varsity Girls Volleyball team appeared in the State Championship games in 2006, 2007, and 2008. As well as Boys Varsity Basketball at the end of the 2008-2009 season, and Boys Varsity Soccer in 2006 and 2009; though none of these teams won the title.
