= Garland Christian Academy =

Location
- 1516 Lavon Drive; Garland, Dallas County, Texas 75040; United States; 32.925228°N 96.626636°W

Information
- Type: Private Christian
- Established: 1972
- Principal: Robby Greene
- Faculty: 22
- Teaching staff: 16.5 (FTE)
- Grades: PreK–12
- Enrollment: 268 (2019–20)
- Student to teacher ratio: 14.9
- Colors: Forest green, Gold, and White
- Team name: Swordsmen
- Website: Official Website

Garland Christian Academy (GCA) is a private preK-12 Christian school in Garland, Texas. As of 2016 it had about 340 students.

Lavon Drive Baptist Church voted to establish the school in 1971 and the school opened in August 1972 with 12 teachers and 136 students. It initially had Kindergarten through 6th grade. Grades 7-11 opened in 1973 and grade 12 opened in 1974.
