= Grace Christian Academy (Cayman Islands) =

Location
- 21 Crescent Close; Grand Cayman; Cayman Islands
- Coordinates: 19°22′20″N 81°24′23″W

Information
- Website: gracechristianacademycayman.org

Grace Christian Academy (GCA) is a Christian private school in West Bay, Grand Cayman, Cayman Islands. It serves up to grade 12 and uses the U.S. educational system. The Hammer family had established it as a ministry of its organization.

The is a member of the Association of Christian Schools International.
