= Global Communications Academy =

Coordinates: 41.7841°N 72.6973°W

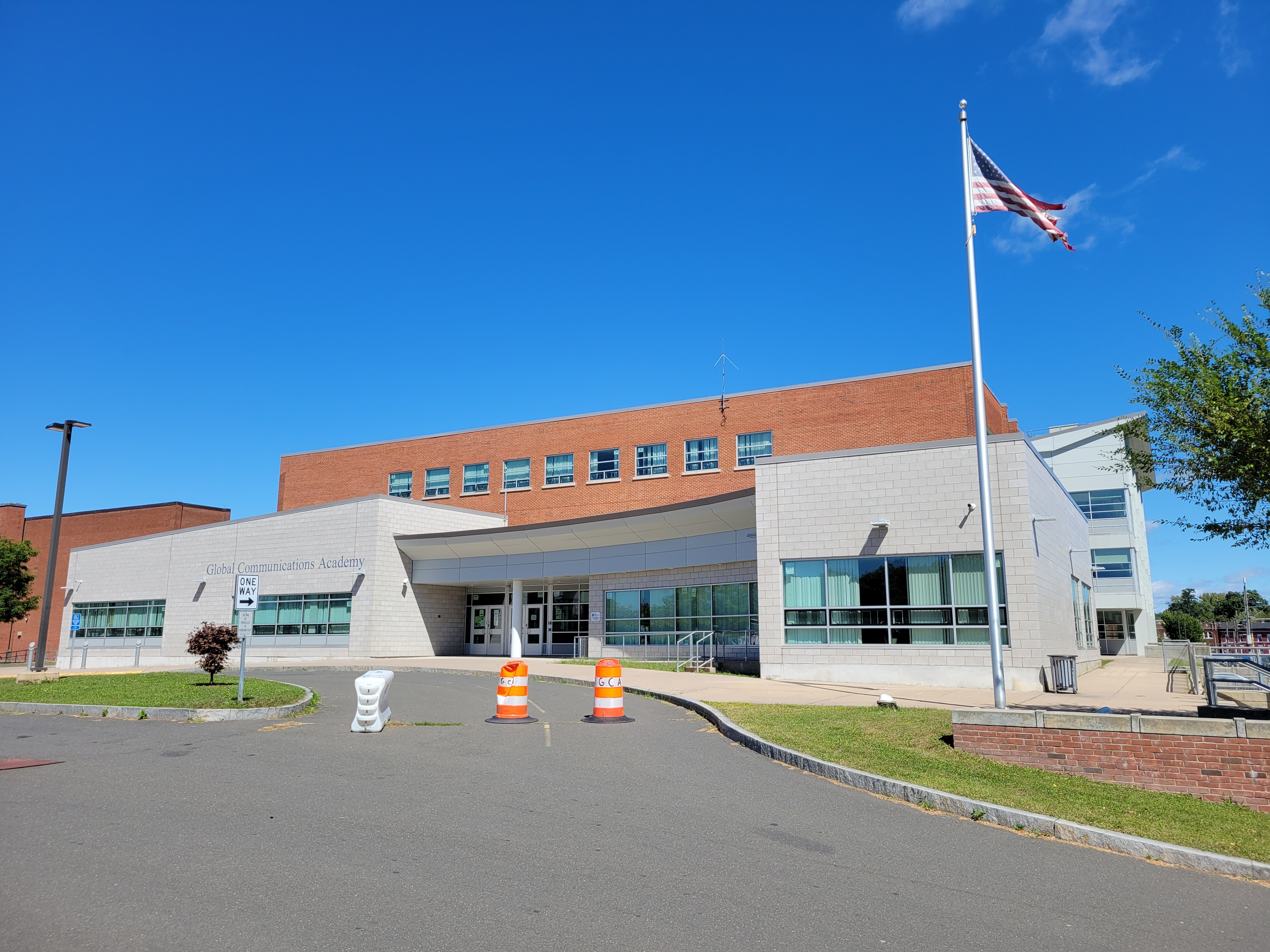

Location
- 85 Edwards Street; Hartford, Connecticut 06120

Information
- Established: August 25, 2008
- Principal: Kimberly Stone, Nicole Jones
- Colors: Navy Blue and Gold

Global Communications Academy is an International Baccalaureate school in Hartford, Connecticut that is partnered with Say Yes to Education. It is part of Hartford Public Schools. The school opened on August 25, 2008. It is now officially a Pre-K-12 school as the Class of 2016 graduation to place June 6, 2016.
