= The Greeting Card Association =

UK trade association for greeting card publishers

The Greeting Card Association is the UK trade association for greeting card publishers. Established in 1919, owned by its membership and run on a not for profit basis, the association is the trade body for the greeting card industry. The GCA resources include free specialist industry information for publishers, the press, artists and writers, students and the general public.

The GCA's official magazine is Progressive Greetings. Launched in 1991, this magazine is editorially led with articles relating to topical industry issues.

The GCA supports The Henries, the greeting card industry awards and Progressive Greetings Live, the only UK trade show dedicated purely to greeting cards.
