= Bram Stoker Award for Best Novel =

Award presented by the Horror Writers Association

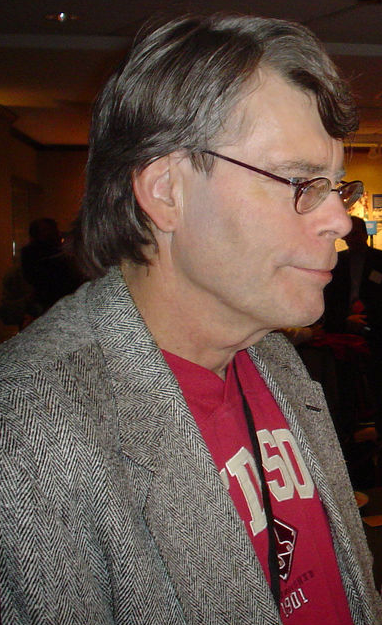
Stephen King at the Harvard Book Store

The Bram Stoker Award for Best Novel is an award presented by the Horror Writers Association (HWA) for "superior achievement" in horror writing for novels.

== Winners and nominees ==
The following are the winners and nominees. Finalists (nominees) are listed under the winner(s) for each year, respectively.

The year of eligibility listed in the table is the year that the work was published; the ceremony when the honor was awarded happening the following year.

Bram Stoker Award for Novel
Year	Recipient	Title	Result	Ref.
1987	Stephen King	Misery	Co-winners	
1987	Robert R. McCammon	Swan Song	Co-winners	
1987	Ray Garton	Live Girls	Nominee	
1987	Kem Nunn	Unassigned Territory	Nominee	
1987	Chet Williamson	Ash Wednesday	Nominee	
1988	Thomas Harris	The Silence of the Lambs	Winner	
1988	Robert R. McCammon	Stinger	Nominee	
1988	F. Paul Wilson	Black Wind	Nominee	
1988	Joe R. Lansdale	The Drive-In	Nominee	
1988	Anne Rice	The Queen of the Damned	Nominee	
1988	Richard Laymon	Flesh	Nominee	
1989	Dan Simmons	Carrion Comfort	Winner	
1989	Katherine Dunn	Geek Love	Nominee	
1989	Charles L. Grant	In a Dark Dream	Nominee	
1989	Dean R. Koontz	Midnight	Nominee	
1989	Robert R. McCammon	The Wolf's Hour	Nominee	
1990	Robert R. McCammon	Mine	Winner	
1990	Richard Laymon	Funland	Nominee	
1990	Chet Williamson	Reign	Nominee	
1990	Joe R. Lansdale	Savage Season	Nominee	
1991	Robert R. McCammon	Boy's Life	Winner	
1991	Thomas M. Disch	The M.D.	Nominee	
1991	Stephen King	Needful Things	Nominee	
1991	Stephen King	The Dark Tower III: The Waste Lands	Nominee	
1991	Dan Simmons	Summer of Night	Nominee	
1992	Thomas F. Monteleone	Blood of the Lamb	Winner	
1992	Matthew Costello	Homecoming	Nominee	
1992	Brian Hodge	Deathgrip	Nominee	
1992	Dean R. Koontz	Hideaway	Nominee	
1992	Dan Simmons	Children of the Night	Nominee	
1993	Peter Straub	The Throat	Winner	
1993	Kim Newman	Anno Dracula	Nominee	
1993	Bradley Denton	Blackburn	Nominee	
1993	Poppy Z. Brite	Drawing Blood	Nominee	
1993	Bentley Little	The Summoning	Nominee	
1994	Nancy Holder	Dead in the Water	Winner	
1994	Caleb Carr	The Alienist	Nominee	
1994	Jonathan Carroll	From the Teeth of Angels	Nominee	
1994	Stephen King	Insomnia	Nominee	
1994	Patrick McCabe	The Butcher Boy	Nominee	
1995	Joyce Carol Oates	Zombie	Winner	
1995	Billie Sue Mosiman	Widow	Nominee	
1995	Yvonne Navarro	Deadrush	Nominee	
1995	Alan Rodgers	Bone Music	Nominee	
1996	Stephen King	The Green Mile	Winner	
1996	Poppy Z. Brite	Exquisite Corpse	Nominee	
1996	Owl Goingback	Crota	Nominee	
1996	Peter Straub	The Hellfire Club	Nominee	
1997	Janet Berliner & George Guthridge	Children of the Dusk	Winner	
1997	Stephen Dobyns	The Church of Dead Girls	Nominee	
1997	Tananarive Due	My Soul to Keep	Nominee	
1997	Tim Powers	Earthquake Weather	Nominee	
1998	Stephen King	Bag of Bones	Winner	
1998	Dean R. Koontz	Fear Nothing	Nominee	
1998	S. P. Somtow	Darker Angels	Nominee	
1998	Thomas Tessier	Fog Heart	Nominee	
1999	Peter Straub	Mr. X	Winner	
1999	Owl Goingback	Darker than Night	Nominee	
1999	Thomas Harris	Hannibal	Nominee	
1999	Stephen King	Low Men in Yellow Coats	Nominee	
1999	Tom Piccirilli	Hexes	Nominee	
2000	Richard Laymon	The Traveling Vampire Show	Winner	
2000	Gary A. Braunbeck	The Indifference of Heaven	Nominee	
2000	Ramsey Campbell	Silent Children	Nominee	
2000	Brian A. Hopkins	The Licking Valley Coon Hunters Club	Nominee	
2000	Tom Piccirilli	The Deceased	Nominee	
2001	Neil Gaiman	American Gods	Winner	
2001	Ray Bradbury	From the Dust Returned	Nominee	
2001	Jack Ketchum	The Lost	Nominee	
2001	Stephen King & Peter Straub	Black House	Nominee	
2002	Tom Piccirilli	The Night Class	Winner	
2002	Douglas Clegg	The Hour Before Dark	Nominee	
2002	Stephen King	From a Buick 8	Nominee	
2002	Chuck Palahniuk	Lullaby	Nominee	
2002	Alice Sebold	The Lovely Bones	Nominee	
2003	Peter Straub	Lost Boy, Lost Girl	Winner	
2003	Stephen King	The Dark Tower V: Wolves of the Calla	Nominee	
2003	James A. Moore	Serenity Falls	Nominee	
2003	Stewart O'Nan	The Night Country	Nominee	
2003	Tom Piccirilli	A Choir of Ill Children	Nominee	
2004	Peter Straub	In the Night Room	Winner	
2004	P. D. Cacek	The Wind Caller	Nominee	
2004	Stephen King	The Dark Tower VII: The Dark Tower	Nominee	
2004	Michael Laimo	Deep in the Darkness	Nominee	
2005	David Morrell	Creepers	Co-winners	
2005	Charlee Jacob	Dread in the Beast	Co-winners	
2005	Gary A. Braunbeck	Keepers	Nominee	
2005	Tom Piccirilli	November Mourns	Nominee	
2006	Stephen King	Lisey's Story	Winner	
2006	Tom Piccirilli	Headstone City	Nominee	
2006	Jonathan Maberry	Ghost Road Blues	Nominee	
2006	Jeff Strand	Pressure	Nominee	
2006	Gary A. Braunbeck	Prodigal Blues	Nominee	
2007	Sarah Langan	The Missing	Winner	
2007	Bruce Boston	The Guardener's Tale	Nominee	
2007	Joe Hill	Heart-Shaped Box	Nominee	
2007	Erika Mailman	The Witch's Trinity	Nominee	
2007	Dan Simmons	The Terror	Nominee	
2008	Stephen King	Duma Key	Winner	
2008	Gary A. Braunbeck	Coffin County	Nominee	
2008	Nate Kenyon	The Reach	Nominee	
2008	Gregory Lamberson	Johnny Gruesome	Nominee	
2009	Sarah Langan	Audrey's Door	Winner	
2009	Jonathan Maberry	Patient Zero	Nominee	
2009	Joe McKinney	Quarantined	Nominee	
2009	Jeremy Shipp	Cursed	Nominee	
2010	Peter Straub	A Dark Matter	Winner	
2010	Joe Hill	Horns	Nominee	
2010	Jonathan Maberry	Rot & Ruin	Nominee	
2010	Linda Watanabe McFerrin	Dead Love	Nominee	
2010	Joe McKinney	Apocalypse of the Dead	Nominee	
2010	Jeff Strand	Dweller	Nominee	
2011	Joe McKinney	Flesh Eaters	Winner	
2011	Christopher Conlon	A Matrix Of Angels	Nominee	
2011	Gregory Lamberson	Cosmic Forces	Nominee	
2011	Ronald Malfi	Floating Staircase	Nominee	
2011	Gene O'Neill	Not Fade Away	Nominee	
2011	Lee Thomas	The German	Nominee	
2012	Caitlin R. Kiernan	The Drowning Girl	Winner	
2012	Lee Thomas	The German	Nominee	
2012	Benjamin Kane Ethridge	Bottled Abyss	Nominee	
2012	John Everson	Nightwhere	Nominee	
2012	Joe McKinney	Inheritance	Nominee	
2012	Bentley Little	The Haunted	Nominee	
2013	Stephen King	Doctor Sleep	Winner	
2013	Joe Hill	NOS4A2	Nominee	
2013	Lisa Morton	Malediction	Nominee	
2013	Sarah Pinborough & F. Paul Wilson	A Necessary End	Nominee	
2013	Christopher Rice	The Heavens Rise	Nominee	
2014	Steve Rasnic Tem	Blood Kin	Winner	
2014	Craig DiLouie	Suffer the Children	Nominee	
2014	Patrick Freivald	Jade Sky	Nominee	
2014	Chuck Palahniuk	Beautiful You	Nominee	
2014	Christopher Rice	The Vines	Nominee	
2015	Paul G. Tremblay	A Head Full of Ghosts	Winner	
2015	Clive Barker	The Scarlet Gospels	Nominee	
2015	Michaelbrent Collings	The Deep	Nominee	
2015	JG Faherty	The Cure	Nominee	
2015	Patrick Freivald	Black Tide	Nominee	
2016	John Langan	The Fisherman	Winner	
2016	Elizabeth Hand	Hard Light	Nominee	
2016	Stephen Graham Jones	Mongrels	Nominee	
2016	Bracken MacLeod	Stranded	Nominee	
2016	Paul G. Tremblay	Disappearance at Devil's Rock	Nominee	
2017	Christopher Golden	Ararat	Winner	
2017	Stephen King & Owen King	Sleeping Beauties	Nominee	
2017	Josh Malerman	Black Mad Wheel	Nominee	
2017	S. P. Miskowski	I Wish I Was Like You	Nominee	
2017	Steve Rasnic Tem	Ubo	Nominee	
2018	Paul G. Tremblay	The Cabin at the End of the World	Winner	
2018	J. D. Barker & Dacre Stoker	Dracul	Nominee	
2018	Alma Katsu	The Hunger	Nominee	
2018	Jonathan Maberry	Glimpse	Nominee	
2018	Josh Malerman	Unbury Carol	Nominee	
2019	Owl Goingback	Coyote Rage	Winner	
2019	Josh Malerman	Inspection	Nominee	
2019	S. P. Miskowski	The Worst Is Yet to Come	Nominee	
2019	Lee Murray	Into the Ashes	Nominee	
2019	Chuck Wendig	Wanderers	Nominee	
2020	Stephen Graham Jones	The Only Good Indians	Winner	
2020	Alma Katsu	The Deep	Nominee	
2020	Todd Keisling	Devil's Creek	Nominee	
2020	Josh Malerman	Malorie	Nominee	
2020	Silvia Moreno-Garcia	Mexican Gothic	Nominee	
2021	Stephen Graham Jones	My Heart Is a Chainsaw	Winner	
2021	V. Castro	The Queen of the Cicadas	Nominee	
2021	Grady Hendrix	The Final Girl Support Group	Nominee	
2021	Cynthia Pelayo	Children of Chicago	Nominee	
2021	Chuck Wendig	The Book of Accidents	Nominee	
2022	Gabino Iglesias	The Devil Takes You Home	Winner	
2022	Alma Katsu	The Fervor	Nominee	
2022	Gwendolyn Kiste	Reluctant Immortals	Nominee	
2022	Josh Malerman	Daphne	Nominee	
2022	Catriona Ward	Sundial	Nominee	
2023	Tananarive Due	The Reformatory	Winner	
2023	Grady Hendrix	How to Sell a Haunted House	Nominee	
2023	Stephen Graham Jones	Don't Fear the Reaper	Nominee	
2023	Victor Lavalle	Lone Women	Nominee	
2023	Chuck Tingle	Camp Damascus	Nominee	
2023	Chuck Wendig	Black River Orchard	Nominee	
2024	Gwendolyn Kiste	The Haunting of Velkwood	Winner	
2024	Gabino Iglesias	House of Bone and Rain	Nominee	
2024	Stephen Graham Jones	I Was a Teenage Slasher	Nominee	
2024	Josh Malerman	Incidents Around the House	Nominee	
2024	Paul G. Tremblay	Horror Movie	Nominee	
2025	Stephen Graham Jones	The Buffalo Hunter Hunter	Winner	
2025	Grady Hendrix	Witchcraft for Wayward Girls	Nominee	
2025	Joe Hill	King Sorrow	Nominee	
2025	Silvia Moreno-Garcia	The Bewitching	Nominee	
2025	Wendy N. Wagner	Girl in the Creek	Nominee	

== Multiple winning authors ==
Ordered first by wins and then by alphabetical order (according to last name).

- Stephen King (6)
- Peter Straub (5)
- Stephen Graham Jones (3)
- Robert R. McCammon (3)
- Sarah Langan (2)
- Paul Tremblay (2)

== Multiple nominated authors ==
Ordered first by nominations, then by at least one win, and finally by alphabetical order (according to last name).

† indicates that the writer also won the award in exactly one occasion (up-to-date as of the 2025 Bram Stoker Awards).

- Stephen King (15)
- Peter Straub (7)
- Stephen Graham Jones (6)
- Tom Piccirilli (6)†
- Robert R. McCammon (5)
- Gary A. Braunbeck (4)
- Joe Hill (4)
- Jonathan Maberry (4)
- Josh Malerman (4)
- Joe McKinney (4)†
- Dan Simmons (4)†
- Paul Tremblay (4)
- Owl Goingback (3)†
- Grady Hendrix (3)
- Dean R. Koontz (3)
- Richard Laymon (3)†
- Chuck Wendig (3)
- Poppy Z. Brite (2)
- Tananarive Due (2)
- Patrick Freivald (2)
- Thomas Harris (2)†
- Gabino Iglesias (2)
- Gwendolyn Kiste (2)
- Gregory Lamberson (2)
- Sarah Langan (2)
- Joe R. Lansdale (2)
- Bentley Little (2)
- S. P. Miskowski (2)
- Silvia Moreno-Garcia (2)
- Chuck Palahniuk (2)
- Christopher Rice (2)
- Jeff Strand (2)
- Steve Rasnic Tem (2)†
- Lee Thomas (2)
- Chet Williamson (2)
- F. Paul Wilson (2)
