= Earthling Publications =

American small press

Earthling Publications is an American small press run by Paul Miller and specialising in limited edition books in the horror and dark fantasy genres.

In 2003, Earthling won the Horror Writers Association Specialty Press Award.

== Books published by Earthling ==
- The Book of Bunk by Glen Hirshberg (2010)
- The Painter, the Creature, and the Father of Lies - a collection by Clive Barker and edited by Phil and Sarah Stokes (forthcoming, 2009)
- Slices by James A. Moore - collection of short stories (2009)
- Midnight on Mourn Street by Christopher Conlon (2008)
- The Hellbound Heart: 20th Anniversary Edition by Clive Barker (2007)
- This Is Now by Michael Marshall Smith (2007)
- The Servants by Michael Marshall Smith (2007)
- American Morons by Glen Hirshberg (2006)
- Pressure by Jeff Strand (2006)
- World of Hurt by Brian Hodge (2006)
- Bloodstained Oz by Christopher Golden and James A. Moore (illustrations by Glenn Chadbourne) (2006)
- King of Souls by Brian Knight (2006)
- Home Before Dark: The Collected Cedar Hill Stories, Vol. 2 by Gary A. Braunbeck (2005) - collection of short stories
- Riverside Blues by Erik Tomblin (2005)
- Apocalypse Now, Voyager by Jay Russell (2004)
- Midnight Rain by James Newman (2004)
- Game by Conrad Williams (2004)
- Exorcising Angels by Simon Clark and Tim Lebbon (2003) - two original stories by each author ("Skins" by Tim Lebbon and "A Bridge to Everywhere" by Simon Clark), and an original collaboration, "Exorcising Angels," all based on the themes of Arthur Machen and the Angels of Mons legends
- The Brotherhood of Mutilation by Brian Evenson (2003)
- More Tomorrow & Other Stories by Michael Marshall Smith (2003) - collection of short stories
- Graveyard People: The Collected Cedar Hill Stories, Vol. 1 by Gary A. Braunbeck (2003) - collection of short stories
- "Dirty Movies" by Gary A. Braunbeck (2003) - a limited chapbook released at the World Horror Convention 2003 to tie in with Graveyard People's release
- Godhead Dying Downwards by Jeffrey Thomas (2003) - 15 lettered copies came with an additional chapbook titled "The Red Spectacles"
- El Dia De Los Muertos by Brian A. Hopkins (2002)
- Simon Clark: A Working Bibliography & A Trip Out for Mr. Harrison by Tim Lebbon and Simon Clark (2000)
- Little Lost Angel by Erik Tomblin (2005)
- After The Elephant Ballet by Gary A. Braunbeck (2005)
- "Blood Tide" by James A. Moore (2005) - a limited edition chapbook only released at the World Horror Convention 2005 to promote Moore's Blood Red
- The Rise and Fall of Babylon by Brian Keene and John Urbancik (2003) - featuring "Babylon Rising" by Brian Keene and "Babylon Falling" by John Urbanrik
- The Longest Single Note, Special Edition by Peter Crowther (2002)
- Cat Stories by Michael Marshall Smith (2001)

=== Earthling Halloween Series ===
Each year, Earthling Publications releases a Halloween themed limited edition book. This started in 2004 with a novella by Glen Hirshberg called Mr. Dark's Carnival (there were only 15 copies made). Because of the low print run for Mr. Dark's Carnival, Earthling considers it #0 of the series.

1. Mr. Dark's Carnival by Glen Hirshberg (2004)
2. Blood Red by James A. Moore (2005)
3. The Unblemished by Conrad Williams (2006)
4. The Haunted Forest Tour by James A. Moore and Jeff Strand (2007)
5. Moontown by Peter Atkins (2008)
6. October Dark by David Herter (2009)
7. By Wizard Oak by Peter Crowther (2010)
8. Blood Harvest by James A. Moore (2011)
9. Motherless Child by Glen Hirshberg (2012)
10. The Bones of You by Gary McMahon (2013)

=== Earthling Modern Classics ===
The titles released by Earthling under their Earthling Modern Classics line are what they consider "much celebrated or are considered cornerstone works."

- King Rat by China Miéville (2005)
- Song of Kali: 20th Anniversary Edition by Dan Simmons (2005)
- The Snowman's Children by Glen Hirshberg (2007)
- Strangewood by Christopher Golden (2008)

=== Anthologies ===
The Earthling Sampler, Vol. 1 edited by Paul Miller (2003)- released as a limited edition hardcover (10 copies) and as a paperback giveaway of a few 100 copies. Featuring:

- Simon Clark's "The Burning Doorway"
- Brian Evenson's "The Din of Celestial Birds"
- Peter Crowther's "The Longest Single Note"
- Brian A. Hopkins' "Diving the Coolidge"
- Tim Lebbon's "Bomber’s Moon"
- Jeffrey Thomas' "The Red Spectacles"
- Gary A. Braunbeck's I Never Spent the Money"
- Michael Marshall Smith's "To Receive is Better"

==== Rolling Darkness Revue anthologies ====
Anthologies containing stories by the authors who were a part of that year's Rolling Darkness Revue tour.

- Rolling Darkness Revue 2005 (a.k.a. Darkness Rising) by Glen Hirshberg, Peter Atkins, Robert Masello, Robert Morrish, Michael Blumlein, and Nancy Holder (2005)
- Rolling Darkness Revue 2006 (a.k.a. At the Sign of the Snowman's Skull) by Peter Atkins, Clay McLeod Chapman, Dennis Etchison, Glen Hirshberg, Lisa Morton, and Norman Partridge (2006)
- Rolling Darkness Revue 2007 (a.k.a. The Twilight Limited) featuring:
  - Peter Atkins' "Last of the Invisible Kings"
  - Dennis Etchison's "Call Home"
  - Glen Hirshberg's "Miss Ill-Kept Runt"
  - Complete text of the Rolling Darkness Revue 2007 original playlet by Atkins and Hirshberg
- The Rolling Darkness Revue 2008 (a.k.a. KRDR 666 Hz: Welcome to the Ether) by Glen Hirshberg ("Like Lick Em Sticks, Like Tina Fey"), Peter Atkins, Kevin Moffett, and the script of the playlet performed on the 2008 tour
- Rolling Darkness Revue 2009 (a.k.a. Barlett: A Centenary Symposium) by Peter Atkins, Glen Hirshberg, and Thomas St. John Bartlett, with an introduction by Barbara Roden. Stories include:
  - Peter Atkins' "Intricate Green Figurines"
  - Thomas St. John Bartlett's "The Memory Pool"
  - Glen Hirshberg's "The Nimble Men"
- Rolling Darkness Revue 2010 (a.k.a. Curtain Call) by Glen Hirshberg, Peter Atkins, James K. Moran. Stories include:
  - Peter Atkins' "Frumpy Little Beat Girl"
  - James K. Moran's "Glimpses Through the Trees"
  - Glen Hirshberg's "Shomer"
  - Glen Hirshberg and Peter Atkins' playlet "Curtain Call"
- Rolling Darkness Revue 2012 (a.k.a. The Raven of October) by Peter Atkins, Glen Hirshberg, and Thomas St. John Bartlett. Stories include:
  - Peter Atkins' "Dancing Like We're Dumb"
  - Thomas St. John Bartlett's "The Problem with Mirrors"
  - Glen Hirshberg's "His Only Audience"
  - Glen Hirshberg and Peter Atkins' playlet "The Raven of October"
- Rolling Darkness Revue 2013 (a.k.a. The Imposter's Monocle) by Peter Atkins, Glen Hirshberg, and Thomas St. John Bartlett. Stories include:
  - Peter Atkins' "Postcards from Abroad"
  - Thomas St. John Bartlett's "Cranley Gardens, SW7"
  - Glen Hirshberg's "Pride"
  - Glen Hirshberg and Peter Atkins' playlet "The Imposter's Monocle"
