= One of Us (novel) =

1998 novel by Michael Marshall Smith

- First edition
- Author: Michael Marshall Smith
- Publisher: HarperCollins (UK)
- Publication date: 1998
- Pages: 320
- ISBN: 9780553106053

One of Us is a novel by Michael Marshall Smith first published in 1998.

It was the third novel Smith had published, and is similar in style to his earlier works, Only Forward and Spares, written as it is in sardonic first person prose, and set in a near future version of west coast America where things have become twisted to a sick degree. This time the plot centres on Hap Thomson, a small-time ne'er-do-well, ex barman who has found a lucrative line as a REMtemp taking care of people's unwanted dreams and memories. However, when he finds himself burdened with a memory of a murder he is forced to find the real culprit and face up to his own past mistakes.

One unusual element of the book is that all electrical appliances have been fitted with a voice and AI similar to those used in his first novel Only Forward.

== Critical reception ==
Antony Johnston of Spike Magazine wrote that old and new readers of Smith's novels would enjoy One of Us while Publishers Weekly said that the novel would shock readers about what their personal dreams could mean.
