= Dare to Believe =

British TV sketch show

Dare To Believe is a surreal TV sketch show that was shown on ITV in the UK. The programme was shown during the early hours of the mornings, and ran for two series between 2002 and 2004, each with thirteen 30 minute episodes. The show gained a cult following amongst students and insomniacs.

It largely consisted of dada-inspired comedy sketches, interspersed with periods of hypnotic visuals. During these hypnotic visuals, its much-used catchphrase was often recited: "Fly like a mouse, run like a cushion, be the small bookcase".

It was written and directed by Tim de Jongh (aka Tim Scott), who also acted in the show. Tim Firth and Michael Marshall Smith who both co-wrote some of the material were better known (along with Tim de Jongh) for their work on the BBC Radio 4 show, And Now In Colour. It was Exec Produced by Robert Howes CEO of The Children's Company which also produced Tim Firths Bafta winning Roger and The Rottentrolls. Dare To Believe was commissioned and then re-commissioned by David Liddament. The show was abandoned upon Liddament's exit from ITV.

The show notably contained voice-over work and appearances by the late Patrick Allen.

== Characters ==
Characters included The Aguamoose Man, the Twarb Coffee Woman and a lady who presented a weather style mini-programme that gave warnings on the size of elks to be expected in various parts of the UK that evening. Another bizarre yet memorable sketch that recurred throughout the series was various multicoloured screens containing an object, for example a spoon, whilst a man and woman's voice alternated saying "What's this?" and then what the object was, occasionally replacing the name of the object with a random phrase, for example "Osprey Housing".
