= William Vandyck =

British writer

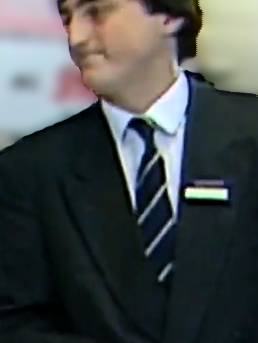
William Vandyck in "The Return of Mr. Bean" (1990)

William Vandyck is an actor, writer and ex-barrister.

== Comedy on radio and TV ==
William Vandyck co-wrote and starred in the BBC Radio 4 series And Now In Colour, which also starred Tim Firth, Tim de Jongh and Michael Rutger; one of the Christmas specials of this show won silver medal at the New York Festivals. He was also the host of the BBC Radio 4 comedy panel series King Stupid, which later became The 99p Challenge, presented by Sue Perkins, and featured in other Radio 4 comedies such as The Intelligence Men and The Legendary Series. During lockdown he also hosted "What Are You Doing?" on community radio station Penarth Sounds. On TV he co-wrote and starred in BBC's It's a Mad World, World, World, World with Alistair McGowan and Caroline Aherne. He also featured as "Man at Till" in The Return of Mr Bean with Rowan Atkinson, and appeared in The Imaginatively Titled Punt and Dennis Show with Steve Punt and Hugh Dennis, and Ripley and Scuff. His scripts won Pozzitive Productions' Funnydotcomp and Sitcom Mission in 2023. His play "Get Away" will be performed at the Rhondda Arts Festival, Treorchy in 2024.

== Books ==
William Vandyck is the author of ten children's books, including The Punctuation Repair Kit. He wrote multiple books with Tim de Jongh, including How to Get Away With Absolutely Anything and How To Do Your Homework in Ten Seconds Flat. They also wrote The Musketeers Adventure Agency and Tony and Cleo's Interesting Year together, with de Jongh credited under the name Tim Scott.
