= Dead in the Water =

Dead in the Water may refer to:

- Dead in the Water (Woods novel), the third book in the Stone Barrington series by Stuart Woods
- Dead in the Water (Holder novel), by Nancy Holder
- Dead in the Water, a novel by Ann Granger
- Dead in the Water (1991 film), a 1991 made-for-TV film starring Bryan Brown and Teri Hatcher
- Dead in the Water (2002 film), a 2002 American thriller
- "Dead in the Water" (Midsomer Murders), an episode of the British television show Midsomer Murders
- "Dead in the Water" (Supernatural), an episode of the television series Supernatural
- Dead in the Water (video game)
- "Dead in the Water", a song by 10 Years from Feeding the Wolves
- "Dead in the Water", a song by Noel Gallagher's High Flying Birds from Who Built the Moon?
- "Dead in the Water", a song by Ellie Goulding from Halcyon
- "Dead in the Water", a song by David Gray from A New Day at Midnight
- "Dead in the Water", a song by Hawthorne Heights from If Only You Were Lonely
- "Dead in the Water", a song from the musical Operation Mincemeat
- Fear The Walking Dead: Dead in the Water, a web series spin-off of The Walking Dead franchise
