= The Servants (novel) =

2008 book by Michael Marshall Smith

- Author: M. M. Smith
- Language: English
- Genre: Fantasy
- Publisher: HarperCollins
- Publication date: 1 April 2008
- Publication place: United Kingdom
- Media type: Print (Hardback)
- Pages: 240 pp
- ISBN: 0-00-726193-4

The Servants is a young adult contemporary fantasy novel by British author Michael Marshall Smith, writing under the name M. M. Smith. It tells the story of an eleven-year-old boy named Mark who, against his wishes, moves away from his home town of London to the wintry Brighton seaside, and the resulting misadventures. It was nominated in 2008 for a World Fantasy Award in the Best Novel category.
