= What You Make It =

1999 short story collection by Michael Marshall Smith

- The cover to What You Make It
- Author: Michael Marshall Smith
- Language: English
- Genre: Short stories
- Publisher: HarperCollins
- Publication date: 1999
- Publication place: UK
- ISBN: 0-00-225602-9
- OCLC: 41582341

What You Make It is a short story collection by English writer Michael Marshall Smith, first published in 1999. It was his first short story collection. The contents were later republished as part of the expanded collection More Tomorrow & Other Stories, which, unlike What You Make It, was available outside of the UK.

== Contents ==
- "More Tomorrow" - Winner of the 1996 British Fantasy Award for Best Short Story
- "Everybody Goes"
- "Hell Hath Enlarged Herself". Gone into production as a co-production between Lightworks Films and Cuba Productions, financed by the UK Film Council
- "A Place to Stay"
- "Later"
- "The Man Who Drew Cats" - Winner of the 1990 British Fantasy Award for Best Short Story
- "The Fracture"
- "Save As..."
- "More Bitter Than Death"
- "Diet Hell"
- "The Owner"
- "Foreign Bodies"
- "Sorted"
- "The Dark Land" - Winner of the 1991 British Fantasy Award for Best Short Story
- "When God Lived in Kentish Town"
- "Always"
- "What You Make It"
- "The Truth Game"
