= Wicked (novel series) =

Book series by Nancy Holder and Debbie Viguié

- Witch; Curse; Legacy; Spellbound; Resurrection
- Author: Nancy Holder, Debbie Viguié
- Country: United States
- Language: English
- Genre: Young adult
- Publisher: Simon Pulse
- Published: October 1, 2002 - July 7, 2009
- Media type: Print (paperback), audiobook

Wicked is a series of young adult novels written by American authors Nancy Holder and Debbie Viguié. The first book, Witch was released in 2002 through Simon Pulse.

In 2009 the series was optioned by DreamWorks' Mark Sourian, with the intent to combine the first two books in the series into a single screenplay.

== Witch and Curse ==
The five novels depict a family feud between a coven of witches called the Cahors and a coven of warlocks called the Deveraux. In Witch, Holly Cathers, the main character, is the lone survivor of the rafting trip her family took with her best friend, and later receives a small cat who is deaf, Bast. After her parents die, her aunt and uncle that she never knew of get custody of her. Bizarre incidents occur to Holly, such as strange visions and dreams. Eventually, Holly realizes she is a witch and that she carries the soul of Isabeau of the Cahors house. Holly belongs to the Cahor house and reveals this to Amanda. Bast (Holly's), Hecate (Nicole's), and Freya (Amanda's) become the three girls cat familiars. However, Nicole already knew a little about witchcraft due to her boyfriend, Eli. When Holly's aunt dies, they are left in the custody of her uncle, Richard. Nicole is performing as Juliet in their school play and suddenly a fire starts. Holly and her cousins discover that Michael and his son, Eli are behind this. Michael is a warlock of House Deveraux. He had an affair with Holly's aunt, Marie-Claire Anderson and was the one who killed her. Jeraud (Jer), Michael's other son attempts to stop him with his girlfriend and his two best friends. Jer carries with him the spirit of his ancestor Jean. Jer and Holly have a strange connection due to the ancestors that they carry with them and at a party they almost fell into bed with one another. At the party though, all three cousins receive a strange burn-like birthmark on their hands, marking them as the Three Ladies of the Lily of the Cahors family. Jean and Isabeau were once married to try to form a connection and truce between the two feuding families, but it backfired as the two lovers had to betray the other, setting forth a Romeo and Juliet type of reincarnation cycle. Jer saves Holly from being burned, but her cousins drag her away before she can save Jer. In the end of Witch, Jer is burned and horribly scarred. And then Curse begins.

== Books ==
1. Witch (2002) (Nancy Holder and Debbie Viguie)
2. Curse (2002) (Nancy Holder, Debbie Viguie, and Kamil Vojnar)
3. Legacy (2003) (Nancy Holder and Debbie Viguie)
4. Spellbound (2003) (Nancy Holder and Debbie Viguie)
5. Resurrection (2009) (Nancy Holder and Debbie Viguie)
