= The 99p Challenge =

- Other names: King Stupid (1998)
- Genre: Spoof panel game
- Running time: 30 mins
- Country of origin: United Kingdom
- Language(s): English
- Home station: BBC Radio 4
- Syndicates: BBC Radio 4 Extra
- Starring: Sue Perkins
- Written by: Kevin Cecil; Andy Riley; Jon Holmes; Tony Roche
- Produced by: David Tyler
- Original release: 22 September 1998 – 29 September 2004
- No. of series: 5
- No. of episodes: 30
- Audio format: Stereo
- Opening theme: Excerpt from Prince Igor by Alexander Borodin
- Ending theme: "99 Luftballons" by Nena
- Website: www.bbc.co.uk/programmes/b00p3708

The 99p Challenge is a spoof panel game originally broadcast on BBC Radio 4. The show is presented by Sue Perkins and features a selection of regular panelists such as Armando Iannucci and regular writers Kevin Cecil, Andy Riley, Jon Holmes and Tony Roche. Panelists are given silly tasks by Perkins (in a manner not dissimilar to those given on I'm Sorry I Haven't A Clue by Humphrey Lyttelton) and are awarded pence for being funny. The player with the most money at the end of the show is given the chance to win 99p. It has been shown in some episodes that the gamble is compulsory, even if the winner has amassed a fortune of more than 99p in the game.

This is the second version of the panel game that was previously transmitted by BBC Radio 4 in 1998 as King Stupid. It was then hosted by William Vandyck and featured much the same line-up of comedians and satirists. The contestants were awarded points instead of pence.

== Transmission dates and cast list ==
Episode	Broadcast	Guests
1st Series 1998 King Stupid
1. 1-1	1998-09-22	Peter Baynham, Simon Pegg, Sue Perkins, Dave Green
2. 1-2	1998-09-29	Peter Baynham, Simon Pegg, Sue Perkins, Dave Green
3. 1-3	1998-10-06	Peter Baynham, Morwenna Banks, Tom Binns, Dave Green
4. 1-4	1998-10-13	Peter Baynham, Simon Pegg, Sue Perkins, Dave Green
5. 1-5	1998-10-20	Peter Baynham, Morwenna Banks, Dave Green, Tom Binns
6. 1-6	1998-10-27	Peter Baynham, Sue Perkins, Simon Pegg, Dave Green
2nd Series 2000 The 99p Challenge
7. 2-1	2000-06-22	Simon Pegg, Peter Baynham, Armando Iannucci, Jack Docherty
8. 2-2	2000-06-29	Simon Pegg, Peter Baynham, Richard Herring, David Quantick
9. 2-3	2000-07-06	Simon Pegg, Peter Baynham, Tom Binns, David Schneider
10. 2-4	2000-07-13	Simon Pegg, Peter Baynham, Richard Herring, Mel Giedroyc
11. 2-5	2000-07-20	Simon Pegg, Peter Baynham, Tom Binns, David Schneider
12. 2-6	2000-07-27	Simon Pegg, Peter Baynham, Armando Iannucci, Jack Docherty
3rd Series 2001
13. 3-1	2001-07-19	Armando Iannucci, Simon Pegg, Bill Bailey, Peter Serafinowicz
14. 3-2	2001-07-26	Armando Iannucci, Simon Pegg, Peter Baynham, David Quantick
15. 3-3	2001-08-02	Armando Iannucci, Simon Pegg, Nick Frost, Ben Moor
16. 3-4	2001-08-09	Peter Serafinowicz, Tom Binns, Nick Frost, Marcus Brigstocke
17. 3-5	2001-08-16	Armando Iannucci, Simon Pegg, Nick Frost, Peter Baynham
18. 3-6	2001-08-23	Peter Serafinowicz, Tom Binns, Nick Frost, Ben Moor
4th Series 2003
19. 4-1	2003-02-04	Armando Iannucci, Simon Pegg, David Quantick, Bill Bailey
20. 4-2	2003-02-11	Armando Iannucci, Simon Pegg, Peter Serafinowicz, Marcus Brigstocke
21. 4-3	2003-02-18	Armando Iannucci, Simon Pegg, Peter Serafinowicz, Jon Holmes
22. 4-4	2003-02-25	Armando Iannucci, Peter Baynham, Marcus Brigstocke, Nick Frost
23. 4-5	2003-03-04	Armando Iannucci, Peter Baynham, Jack Docherty, Sean Lock
24. 4-6	2003-03-11	Armando Iannucci, Simon Pegg, Marcus Brigstocke, Jon Holmes
5th Series 2004
25. 5-1	2004-08-25	Armando Iannucci, Peter Baynham, Simon Pegg, Jon Holmes
26. 5-2	2004-09-01	Armando Iannucci, Peter Serafinowicz, Miranda Hart, Rob Rouse
27. 5-3	2004-09-08	Armando Iannucci, Peter Baynham, Simon Pegg, Dan Antopolski
28. 5-4	2004-09-15	Armando Iannucci, Rob Rouse, Jon Holmes, Marcus Brigstocke
29. 5-5	2004-09-22	Armando Iannucci, Nick Frost, Marcus Brigstocke, Miranda Hart
30. 5-6	2004-09-29	Armando Iannucci, Nick Frost, Rob Rouse, Peter Serafinowicz

Series of the show continue to be repeated on BBC Radio 4 Extra.

== Theme tune ==
The show's theme is an excerpt from Alexander Borodin's opera Prince Igor. The show ends with Nena's "99 Luftballons". After the panellists are introduced, a brief snippet of Carl Orff's O Fortuna from Carmina Burana is played.
