= More Tomorrow & Other Stories =

2003 book by Michael Marshall Smith

- First edition
- Author: Michael Marshall Smith
- Cover artist: John Picacio
- Language: English
- Genre: Short stories / fiction
- Publisher: Earthling Publications
- Publication date: 2003
- Publication place: United States
- Media type: 1000 numbered hardback copies 26 lettered traycased copies
- ISBN: 0-9744203-0-1; ISBN 0-9744203-1-X
- OCLC: 53935214

More Tomorrow & Other Stories is a collection by British author Michael Marshall Smith. It draws together 30 of the author's short stories, including several written specifically for this book. Smith's short stories had been partially collected in 1999's What You Make It, but this had only been published in the UK. More Tomorrow & Other Stories represented the first time that the stories had been published for the American market. In addition to the extra stories, it features an introduction by Stephen Jones and an afterword by Smith.

Published in 2003 as a limited edition by Earthling Publications, it exists in two states: 1000 signed and numbered copies and 26 signed and lettered traycased copies. Both are sold out.

The collection itself won the 2003 International Horror Guild Award for Best Collection, and contains several award winning stories.

== Contents ==
- Introduction: Alias Smith & Jones, by Stephen Jones
- "More Tomorrow" - Winner of the 1996 British Fantasy Award for Best Short Story, and the title story of the collection
- "Being Right"
- "Hell Hath Enlarged Herself". This story recently gone into production as a co-production between Lightworks Films and Cuba Productions, financed by the UK Film Council.
- "Save As..."
- "The Handover"
- "What You Make It"
- "Maybe Next Time"
- "The Book of Irrational Numbers"
- "When God Lived in Kentish Town"
- "The Man Who Drew Cats". Winner of the 1990 British Fantasy Award for Best Short Story
- "A Place To Stay"
- "The Dark Land". Winner of the 1991 British Fantasy Award for Best Short Story
- "To See The Sea"
- "Two Shot"
- "Last Glance Back"
- "They Also Serve"
- "Dear Alison"
- "To Receive Is Better"
- "The Munchies"
- "Always"
- "Not Waving"
- "Everybody Goes"
- "Dying"
- "Charms"
- "Open Doors"
- "Later"
- "More Bitter Than Death"
- "A Long Walk, For The Last Time"
- "The Vaccinator"
- "Enough Pizza"
- "On Not Writing" - Afterword by the author
