= Gwendolyn Kiste =

US horror writer

- Born: Massillon, Ohio
- Awards: Bram Stoker Award for Best First Novel (2018); Lambda Literary Award for Bisexual Fiction (2023); Bram Stoker Award for Best Novel (2024)

Gwendolyn Kiste is a Pennsylvania-based horror and speculative fiction writer. She writes short stories and novels. She won the 2018 Bram Stoker Award for Best First Novel for The Rust Maidens, the 2024 Bram Stoker Award for Best Novel for The Haunting of Velkwood and the 2023 Lambda Literary Award for Bisexual Fiction for Reluctant Immortals.

Kiste was born in Massillon, Ohio and was raised in New Philadelphia, Ohio. She now lives outside Pittsburgh, Pennsylvania. She is openly bisexual. She wrote for the Pittsburgh City Paper where she has been their theater reviewer. She also wrote plays for the Massillon Museum. Initially she worked as an independent filmmaker before deciding to work in print. Her work has been published in a number of horror and science fiction genre magazines including Interzone, Nightmare, LampLight, Shimmer Magazine and Daily Science Fiction. Her award-winning first novel has been translated into Spanish.

== Bibliography ==
=== Novels ===
- A Shadow of Autumn (2015)
- And Her Smile Will Untether the Universe (2017)
- Pretty Marys All in a Row (2017)
- The Rust Maidens (2018)
- Behold the Undead of Dracula: Lurid Tales of Cinematic Gothic Horror (2019) with Matthew M. Bartlett
- Boneset and Feathers (2020)
- Reluctant Immortals (2022)
- The Haunting of Velkwood (2024)

=== Short fiction ===
- Bedroom Bureau (2014)
- Audrey at Night (2014)
- Pink Moon (2014)
- The Man in the Ambry (2015)
- One Bad House (2015)
- Once Lost, Gone Forever (2015)
- The Clawfoot Requiem (2015)
- Lemonade Seance (2015)
- Calling Hours (2015)
- For Sale: Death Ray (2015)
- Man Seeking Minion (2015)
- Man Seeking Woman (2015)
- Missed Connection: Man with a Death Ray (2015)
- Seeking Home Improvement Contractor (2015)
- Late-Night Drive (2015)
- Something Borrowed, Something Blue (2015)
- Ten Things to Know About the Ten Questions (2015)
- The September Ceremony (2015)
- The Grey Man (2015)
- Snake Food (2016)
- A Certain Kind of Spark (2016)
- All the Red Apples Have Withered to Gray (2016)
- Find Me, Mommy (2016)
- Through Earth and Sky (2016)
- The Tower Princesses (2016)
- Reasons I Hate My Big Sister (2016)
- Holiday Playlist for the End of the World (2016)
- The Twelve Rules of Etiquette at Miss Firebird's School for Girls (2017)
- Green with Scales / Gray with Tar (2017)
- And Her Smile Will Untether the Universe (2017)
- By Now, I'll Probably Be Gone (2017)
- Skin Like Honey and Lace (2017)
- The Five-Day Summer Camp (2017)
- The Lazarus Bride (2017)
- Songs to Help You Cope When Your Mom Won't Stop Haunting You and Your Friends (2017)
- A Pocket Guide for Mistress Horne's Home for Weary Travelers (2017)
- Pretty Marys All in a Row (2017)
- 40 Ways to Leave Your Monster Lover (2017)
- To Blaze a Sweet Heretic's Heart (2018)
- In the Belly of the Wolf (2018)
- An Elegy for Childhood Monsters (2018)
- In Her Flightless Wings, a Fire (2018) with Emily B. Cataneo
- The Woman Out of the Attic (2019)
- A Lost Student's Handbook for Surviving the Abyss (2019)
- Over the Violets There That Lie (2019)
- A New Mother's Guide to Raising an Abomination (2019)
- Forthcoming untitled story in the anthology Creepshow: 13 Tales of Terror (2026)
