= The Haunting of Velkwood =

2024 horror novel by Gwendolyn Kiste

- Author: Gwendolyn Kiste
- Language: English
- Genre: Horror
- Published: 5 Mar 2024
- Publisher: Saga Press, Simon & Schuster
- Publication place: United States
- Pages: 256 (hardcover)
- Awards: 2024 Bram Stoker Award for Best Novel
- ISBN: 9781982172374

The Haunting of Velkwood is a 2024 horror novel by Gwendolyn Kiste. It tells the story of Talitha Velkwood, whose neighborhood became involved in a supernatural phenomenon. Talitha and her childhood friends are forced to confront their past in order to move forward. The novel won the 2024 Bram Stoker Award for Best Novel.

== Plot ==
The Velkwood Vicinity is an unexplained supernatural phenomenon. An entire street of houses becomes ghostly and insubstantial. Three young women escape, having returned to college the previous night. Their names are Grace Spencer, Brett Hadley, and Talitha Velkwood. Thirteen people, including Talitha's mother and her sister Sophie, are trapped inside and presumed dead. The only people who can re-enter the Vicinity are its original inhabitants, making research almost impossible. The lives of the survivors are forever changed. Grace becomes a recluse. Talitha and Brett slowly drift apart.

Twenty years later, a researcher named Jack approaches Talitha. Talitha agrees to re-enter the Vicinity, hoping to rescue Sophie. Inside, she observes ghostly figures who cannot see or hear her. Talitha remembers spending time with Brett. The girls used to fantasize about escaping from their small town and Brett's alcoholic, abusive stepfather. The entire neighborhood knew that Brett was being abused, but none of the adults intervened.

Talitha sees Enid, another ghost. Talitha ruefully thinks that she, Brett, and Grace should never have left Enid behind. Unlike the other spirits, Enid can see Talitha. Talitha remembers an event when the girls were eight. Enid demonstrated supernatural abilities by resurrecting dead earthworms. Talitha leaves the Vicinity and returns to Jack. Despite having spent only a subjective hour inside, Talitha has been gone for three months. Talitha tells Jack about her experiences, but she lies about seeing Enid.

On her second trip inside the Vicinity, Talitha speaks to Enid. Enid admits that she caused the Vicinity, stating that she fixed everything as the other girls had asked her. Back in the real world, Jack asks Talitha about the final night before the three young women returned to college. Talitha lies and states that nothing unusual happened. Talitha considers sleeping with Jack but is interrupted when Brett arrives unexpectedly.

Brett and Talitha discuss their last night at home. Together, they and Grace killed Brett's sexually abusive stepfather. Enid helped cover up the crime by creating the Vicinity. Talitha also remembers a night in which her mother caught her kissing Brett, accusing her of being a bad daughter. Talitha rescues Sophie from the Vicinity. However, Sophie's body begins to fall apart if she strays too far from the boundary. Enid asks Brett and Talitha to return with Grace, so they can finish what they all started together. Back in the real world, Talitha apologizes for pushing Brett away for all of the previous years. They make love. They then go to retrieve Grace, who agrees to help them one final time.

Talitha, Sophie, Grace, and Brett return to the Vicinity. Inside, Talitha sees that the street, the houses, and Sophie are crumbling to dust. All of the Vicinity's inhabitants converge on Brett's bedroom. Brett's stepfather reappears. The women re-enact the night when they killed him. The ghosts, who refused to help Brett in life, attack and kill her stepfather once again. The ghosts then destroy all of the houses in the neighborhood. As the Vicinity disintegrates, Grace stays with the ghosts to move on to the afterlife. Talitha says farewell to Sophie. She and Brett leave the Vicinity for the final time.

Afterwards, Talitha confesses her love for Brett. The two drive away from town, still haunted by their pasts, but planning a future together.

== Reception and awards ==
Matthew Jackson of Paste called the book a "high-concept horror" that has elevated Kiste from a rising voice in the genre to one of its mainstay authors. Jackson praised the novel's brisk pace and Kiste's prose, which drives the novel to an emotional conclusion. The review concluded that the book is "a meditation on roads not taken, on the ways in which our childhood homes can become spaces we never quite leave."

Kirkus Reviews felt that the haunting was "original and atmospheric." The review praised the way in which the novel's women speak out about their past abuse and confront past traumas. The same review criticized the predictable "dark history of Talitha's suburbia" which limited the novel's emotional impact.

Publishers Weekly wrote that the novel was fast-paced and had some "truly uncanny imagery" but felt that "the eerie atmospherics often fail to take on larger meaning." The review criticized the plot as predictable, stating that the novel was best suited for Kiste's die-hard fans.

The novel won the 2024 Bram Stoker Award for Best Novel and was nominated for the 2024 Shirley Jackson Award for Best Novel.
