= Owl Goingback =

American novelist (born 1959)

- Born: James Russell Heidbrink; May 1, 1959 (age 67); St. Louis, Missouri, U.S.
- Occupation: Author
- Spouse: Nancy Santos Bello
- Children: 2
- Writing career
- Language: English
- Genre: Horror fiction
- Notable awards: Bram Stoker Award for Lifetime Achievement (2020)
- Website: owlgoingback.com

Owl Goingback (born James Russell Heidbrink, May 1, 1959) is an American author of horror, fantasy and science fiction.

== Early life ==
According to his personal website, Owl Goingback was given the surname Heidbrink at the age of ten, when he was adopted by his stepfather Carl M. Heidbrink. According to the Daily Beast, the author legally changed his name to Owl Goingback in 2000 in Seminole County, Florida.

In his biographical statements, Goingback writes that he grew up in the rural Midwest, and that his mother's name was Quiet Starr. He dropped out of high school his senior year to join the United States Air Force and later attended Embry–Riddle Aeronautical University. On January 5, 1978, Goingback married Nancy Santos Bello, with whom he has two sons, Jason and Michael.

== Military and early career ==
From 1976 to 1981, Goingback served as a jet engine mechanic in the United States Air Force, where he became a sergeant. He received a good conduct medal and Air Force Longevity Service Award. After leaving the military, Goingback owned and managed a restaurant in Georgia called Jim's Place from 1981 to 1986, after which he devoted himself to writing full-time.

== Writing ==
Goingback writes horror fiction novels, often with Native American subject matter.

In addition to writing novels, children's stories, scripts, and other documents under his own name, he writes that he "has ghostwritten for Hollywood celebrities", and that he travels throughout the United States lecturing about "the customs and folklore of the American Indians" and has worked as a model and actor.

== Personal ==
The author legally changed his name to Owl Goingback in Seminole County, Florida in 2000. Goingback presently lives in Florida with his wife and sons.

In 2019, the Orlando Weekly wrote that Goingback "is of Choctaw and Cherokee heritage." As of March 2024, the author's website states that he is of "mixed blood Native American heritage (Choctaw/Cherokee, not enrolled, and Caucasian)." Goingback states his family does not enroll to avoid being "wards of the federal government."

The Tribal Alliance Against Frauds organisation has denounced Goingback as a "pretendian", stating that their genealogical investigation has found no record of any Native American ancestry for him.

== Awards ==
Awards for Goingback
Year	Title	Award	Result	Ref.
1996	"Grass Dancer"	Nebula Award for Best Short Story	Nominee	
1996	Crota	Bram Stoker Award for Best First Novel	Winner	
1996	Crota	Bram Stoker Award for Best Novel	Finalist	
1998	Eagle Feathers	Storytelling World Award for Pre-Adolescent Listeners	Honor	
1999	Darker than Night	Bram Stoker Award for Best Novel	Finalist	
2019	Coyote Rage	Bram Stoker Award for Best Novel	Winner	
2020		Bram Stoker Award for Lifetime Achievement	Winner	

== Bibliography ==
- Crota (1996)
- Eagle feathers (1997)
- The Gift (1997)
- Shaman Moon (1997)
- Darker Than Night (1999)
- Evil Whispers (2001)
- Breed (2002)
- Coyote Rage (2019)
- Evil Whispers (2023)

== See also ==
- List of horror fiction authors
