= The Queen of the Cicadas =

2021 horror novel by V. Castro

- Author: V. Castro
- Language: English
- Genre: Horror
- Set in: Texas; Mexico
- Published: 22 Jun 2021
- Publisher: Flame Tree Press
- Pages: 224
- ISBN: 9781787586017

The Queen of the Cicadas is a 2021 horror novel by V. Castro. It is the author's debut novel.

== Plot ==
In 1952, a Mexican woman named Milagros is harassed by a man who wishes to marry her. The man dies under mysterious circumstances. In order to salvage her family’s reputation, Milagros migrates to Texas to become a farm worker. Milagros is sexually harassed by the farm owner’s nephew Billy, but she rejects his advances. Milagros decides to leave the farm.

Before she can leave, Milagros is attacked by Billy’s jealous wife Tonya. Tonya ties Milagros to a tree, dumps fire ants over her, and stuffs cicadas into her mouth. Milagros dies as a result of the insect bites.

As Milagros dies, her cries for vengeance are heard by the goddess Mictecacihuatl. Mictecacihuatl kills Tonya’s friends, who did not interfere as Tonya tortured Milagros. Each of the guilty women is killed in a brutal manner involving cicadas or other insects. Later, the goddess causes a car accident due to a swarm of cicadas. This collision kills Billy and breaks Tonya’s spine, leaving her with locked-in syndrome.

The farm where Milagros died becomes barren and becomes the site of a new urban legend. Local teenagers state calling on La Reina de las Chicharras (“the queen of the cicadas”) will cause the ghost of Milagros to appear.

Decades later, in the year 2019, Belinda Montoya attends the wedding of a childhood friend. Belinda is a lawyer who has overcome substantial childhood adversity at the cost of a strained relationship with her teenage son as well as a burgeoning alcohol problem. The wedding venue is located at the site where Milagros was murdered.

Belinda befriends Hector, the owner of the venue. They meet Pastor Rich, the man who found Milagros’s body and later officiated her funeral. Rich provides them with old documents, allowing them to confirm Milagros’s surname and last known address. Belinda and Hector decide to bring news of Milagros to her surviving family members.

Hector and Belinda journey to Milagros’s home town, where they meet her grandnephew Benny and eventually her surviving twin sister, Concepción. The Santos family knew that Milagros had disappeared, but Belinda informs them of the circumstances behind Milagros’s murder. Concepción has been in a catatonic state since 1952. After hearing about her sister’s murder, she speaks for the first time in decades. Concepción kills her nurse and then herself.

Belinda and Hector return to Texas, where they erect a plaque in memory of Milagros. A camera crew interviews Hector about the supposedly haunted house; one member of the crew is killed by Mictecacihuatl. Videos of the death, and subsequent appearances by the goddess, go viral. The goddess begins appearing to many people who call upon her, telling people when and how they will die. La Reina de las Chicharras gains international notoriety and becomes a new religious movement.

Belinda has a vision of Mictecacihuatl giving birth to Milagros. Milagros also begins appearing in people’s visions. Milagros escorts Pastor Rich to the afterlife. His church sits abandoned and is eventually purchased by Ari, an investor who wants to dedicate a cathedral to the new religion. Hector and Benny begin a romantic relationship. Belinda agrees to be their surrogate. She simultaneously begins a relationship with Ari. While she and Ari have sex, Mictecacihuatl appears with them. Belinda is shocked to discover that she has become pregnant with twins; Hector and Ari are the fathers.

Belinda experiences a uterine rupture and undergoes and emergency cesarean section. She gives birth to healthy baby girls. Mictecacihuatl escorts Belinda to the afterlife, promising her a place in the new religious movement.

== Background ==
In an interview with Daniel Olivas of the Los Angeles Review of Books, Castro stated that her novel was inspired by urban legends that she heard while growing up in Texas. However, Castro noted that "the urban legends we see in literature and film rarely reflect my heritage or experiences. I wanted to represent who I am and where I come from. There are so many legends and stories desperate to be told by us and featuring us." She also stated that many parts of the book were written as a reaction to the novel American Dirt.

== Reception and awards ==
The novel received a starred review from Kirkus Reviews, which stated that it "shifts seamlessly from deliciously gory horror narrative to family saga to a tale of righteous vengeance, all while maintaining its unflinching condemnation of colonialism on both sides of the Mexican-American border." Becky Spratford of Library Journal also gave the novel a starred review, stating that "Castro delivers an unflinching, honest, raw, and thought-provoking horror tale that is both serious in its social commentary and fun to read." The reviewer recommended the novel for fans of The Only Good Indians by Stephen Graham Jones and Frankenstein in Baghdad by Ahmed Saadawi.

In a review for Locus, Paula Guran criticized certain aspects of the story.

Attending the wedding of a friend at a lovely restored Victorian farmhouse in Texas, she realizes it is the historic location of a vicious murder almost 70 years before, a murder that gave rise to the not-exactly urban (since the area is rural) legend of La Reina de las Chicharras/The Queen of the Cicadas... Considering Belinda helped her friend plan the wedding for a year, was central to the decision to have it at the place (which has been featured in paranormal-related media for years and attracts guests due to its haunted reputation), and is well aware of the spooky legend, it is hard to believe she didn’t realize it sooner. (The author herself seems to have a little trouble with this point but continues gamely on.)

Guran did have some positive feedback as well, stating that "the best thing about the novel is its accurate portrayal of the life of migrant farmworkers in 1952 Texas. Additional points can be awarded for effective use of Mexican culture and mythology, women-oriented elements, a theme of perseverance, and the condemnation of racism."

Awards and honors
Year	Award	Category	Result	Ref.
2021	Bram Stoker Award	Best Novel	Finalist	
2021	Ladies of Horror Fiction Award	Best Novel	Finalist	
