= Alma Katsu =

American writer

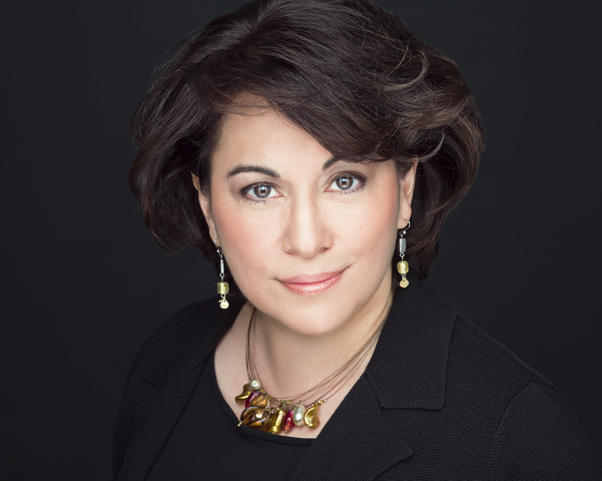
- Born: Alma Katsu; November 29, 1959 (age 66); Fairbanks, Alaska, U.S.
- Education: Brandeis University (BA); Johns Hopkins University (MA)
- Occupations: Author; novelist; writer
- Spouse: Bruce Katsu
- Writing career
- Genres: Paranormal romance, historical fiction, Gothic fiction, dark fantasy
- Notable works: The Taker, The Reckoning, The Descent
- Notable awards: Bram Stoker Award for Best Long Fiction (2022)
- Website: almakatsubooks.com

Alma Katsu (born November 29, 1959) is an American writer of adult fiction. Her books have been translated into over a dozen languages, and have been published in the United Kingdom, Brazil, Spain, and Italy.

Katsu has also had a 29-year career in the NSA and CIA working in a number of positions dealing with intelligence and foreign policy, with an emphasis on technology issues. She previously worked as a senior policy analyst for the RAND Corporation.

== Biography ==
Katsu was born in Fairbanks, Alaska, the daughter of an American-born father and a Japanese-born mother. She spent the majority of her youth living near Concord, Massachusetts, to which she attributes her interest in the early American history featured in her novels. She attended Brandeis University (BA in literature and writing, 1981), where she studied with novelist John Irving and children's book author Margaret Rey, and the Johns Hopkins University (MA in fiction, 2004). She is also an alumna of the Squaw Valley writers workshops.

She was an analyst for the National Security Agency.

== Career ==
Katsu's writing has received praise for its quality and ability to create authentic and realistic settings. She published her first novel, The Taker, in 2011 through Gallery Books. It received praise from outlets such as Booklist and The Washington Post and was recognized as one of the ten best debut novels of the year by the American Library Association.

Described as a literary take on the Faustian bargain, The Taker Trilogy tells the story of a young woman who has been given eternal life but comes to see this condition as a punishment for evil acts she perpetrated in life and is now condemned to revisit until the end of time.

== Personal life ==
She lives in the Washington, DC area with her husband, musician Bruce Katsu.

== Bibliography ==
=== Standalone novels ===
- —— (2018). The Hunger. Transworld. ISBN 9781473542419.
- —— (2020). The Deep. Transworld. ISBN 9781787631342.
- —— (2022). The Fervor. G. P. Putnam's Sons. ISBN 9780593328330.
- —— (2025). Fiend. G. P. Putnam's Sons. ISBN 9780593714348.

=== The Taker trilogy ===
1. —— (2011). The Taker. Gallery Books. ISBN 9781439197059.
2. —— (2012). The Reckoning. Gallery Books. ISBN 9781451651805.
3. —— (2014). The Descent. Gallery Books. ISBN 9781451651829.

==== Novellas ====
1.5 —— (2012). The Devil's Scribe. Pocket Star Books. ISBN 9781451687965.
2.5 —— (2013). The Witch Sisters. Melancholy Press. ISBN 9781301365159.

=== Lyndsey Duncan novels ===
- —— (2021). Red Widow. G. P. Putnam's Sons. ISBN 9780525539414.
- —— (2023). Red London. G. P. Putnam's Sons. ISBN 9780593421956.

=== Chapbooks ===
- —— (2022). The Wehrwolf (kindle ed.). Amazon Original Stories. ISBN 9781662507656.

=== Short stories ===
- "The Marriage Price", 2012 (ASIN B00B0QITYC)
- "Pipefitter's Union", in anthology Enhanced Gravity, Paycock Press (ISBN 0931181208)
- "Make your own way", in anthology The End of the World As We Know It: New Tales of Stephen King's The Stand

== Awards ==
The Taker was named one of the ten best debut novels of 2011 by Booklist magazine, the publication of the American Library Association. The second novel, The Reckoning, was nominated for several year-end awards including Goodreads Choice Award for Best Paranormal Fantasy and Romantic Times Book Reviews Reviewers Choice Award for Best Paranormal Romance. The Deep was a finalist for the Bram Stoker Award for Superior Achievement in a Novel and a finalist for the Locus Award for Best Horror Novel.

Year	Title	Award	Category	Place	Ref.
2012	The Reckoning	Goodreads Choice Awards	Paranormal Fantasy	Nominated—19th	
2012	The Reckoning	Romantic Times Reviewers Choice Award	Paranormal Romance		
2018	The Hunger	Bram Stoker Award	Novel	Shortlisted	
2018	The Hunger	Goodreads Choice Awards	Horror	Nominated—8th	
2019	The Hunger	Locus Award	Horror Novel	Nominated—5th	
2020	The Deep	Bram Stoker Award	Novel	Shortlisted	
2021	The Deep	Locus Award	Horror Novel	Nominated—8th	
2021	The Deep	Virginia Literary Awards	Fiction	Finalist	
2022	The Fervor	Bram Stoker Award	Novel	Shortlisted	
2022	The Fervor	Goodreads Choice Awards	Horror	Nominated—20th	
2022	The Wehrwolf	Bram Stoker Award	Long Fiction	Won	
2022	The Wehrwolf	Shirley Jackson Award	Novella	Shortlisted	
2023	The Fervor	International Thriller Writers Awards	Hardcover Novel	Nominated	
2023	The Fervor	Locus Award	Horror Novel	Shortlisted	
