= The Deep (Katsu novel) =

2020 historic fiction

- First edition (US)
- Author: Alma Katsu
- Language: English
- Genre: Horror, historical fiction
- Set in: 1910s
- Publisher: Bantam Press (UK); G. P. Putnam's Sons (US)
- Publication date: March 5, 2020 (UK); March 10, 2020 (US)
- Publication place: United Kingdom; United States
- Media type: Print (hardcover), ebook, audiobook
- Pages: 432 pp
- ISBN: 9781787631342 (First edition UK hardcover); 9780525537908 (First edition US hardcover)
- OCLC: 1105148559
- Dewey Decimal: 813/.6
- LC Class: PS3611.A7886 D44 2020
- Preceded by: The Hunger
- Followed by: Red Widow
- Website: www.almakatsubooks.com/books/the-deep/

The Deep is a 2020 historical fiction horror novel written by Alma Katsu. It was published in the United Kingdom through Bantam Press and in the United States through G. P. Putnam's Sons.

Katsu came up with the idea for The Deep after viewing a documentary on a dive to HMHS Britannic.

== Plot ==
The novel's plot switches between various time periods. The following synopsis is told in chronological order. The novel also features elements that question whether or not supernatural elements in the novel actually occurred or if they were due to mental illness, superstition, or susceptibility towards supernatural beliefs of the characters.

=== 1912 ===
As passengers board the RMS Titanic, first class stewardess Annie Hebley meets Mark, Caroline, and Ondine Fletcher. She is immediately drawn to Mark and the Fletchers ask Annie to regularly prepare milk for Ondine, as the baby takes to her instantly. Mark, who has a gambling addiction, is eventually approached by the Welsh boxer, Leslie "Les" Williams, who convinces him to sneak into the luggage hold and steal stored money from the luggage of John Jacob and Madeleine Astor. Les had discovered the money's existence by way of a con centered around him pretending to be psychic, much to the disapproval of his secret lover and fellow boxer, David "Dai" John Bowen. Before the money is stolen, however, the Astors' servant boy dies under mysterious and seemingly supernatural circumstances. Annie discovers Caroline's brooch on the boy and although she plans on returning it, keeps it on her person.

Annie's attraction to Mark eventually leads to Caroline suspecting the woman of poisoning Ondine and of deliberately trying to cause her harm. These suspicions are further exacerbated by Caroline's blossoming addiction to laudanum. Caroline and Mark tell her to stay away from them, which upsets Annie. After stealing the money, Mark becomes ashamed and wants nothing more to do with Dai, Les, or the money. Dai, angered by the theft, tries to return the money but is caught. Les confesses that Dai had nothing to do with the theft and is imprisoned. Meanwhile, Annie has discovered the existence of Mark's former lover, Lillian, and that Ondine is actually Lillian's child, not Caroline's. Assuming the baby is stolen, Annie attempts to report the suspected theft via telegram and in so doing, discovers warning messages giving the coordinates of an iceberg in the ship's course.

Annie tries to steal the messages and deliver them to the captain, but is caught and imprisoned before they can be delivered, resulting in the accidental destruction of the messages. While in prison, Annie investigates the brooch and discovers that it was used to hold compacted laudanum, causing the realization that the servant boy's death was due to the accidental ingestion of the drug and wasn't supernatural. She also suspects that Caroline has been feeding Ondine the drug as a way of gaining relief from the pressures of parenthood. She is eventually freed from prison after the ship hits the iceberg and ends up on a lifeboat alongside Caroline, who stumbles and falls into the water with Ondine. Annie dives into the water and is successful in saving Ondine, but is unable to save Caroline due to the woman's heavy wool dress and coat.

=== 1916 ===
After the prior events, Annie has been in a mental institution. She is offered a job by Violet Jessop, as the two women had served together on the Titanic, who urges her to become a nurse on the hospital ship HMHS Britannic, which has been built to nearly the same specifications as its sister ship. Annie is stunned when the job brings her back in contact with Mark, who had been fighting in the First World War, as she believed him to be dead. Mark is stunned and frightened by Annie's insistence that they had a passionate love affair on board the ship, as he states that their interactions went no further than light flirting.

Annie discovers Lillian's journal and discovers the full truth about Mark, Lillian, and Caroline, as previously she had only known snippets. This is also interspersed with flashbacks told from Mark's point of view. Mark's lover, Lillian worked as a seamstress for the wealthy Caroline. The two quickly became friends and when Lillian discovered she was pregnant, Caroline invited Lillian and Mark to live with her. She also volunteered to adopt the child once it was born, as Lillian did not want to be a mother and Caroline could not have children. The setup was initially idyllic but over time, Lillian began to suspect that Mark and Caroline were sleeping together, as they shared a strong attraction. Once the baby was born, Lillian began to regret the pending adoption, as she now wished to marry and raise the child with Mark. She discovered a first class ticket in Mark's possessions and mistakenly assumed that he was going to abandon her. Heartbroken, Lillian mutilated her face and committed suicide in a nearby river. Unbeknownst to her, Mark had never been unfaithful and had planned on rejecting Caroline and marrying Lillian. Grief-stricken, Mark resigned himself to marrying Caroline, but always carried Lillian's journal close to his heart, unable to truly move on.

After completing the journal, Annie sees Lillian's face in a mirror and is informed by a sea witch that she is actually Lillian possessing Annie's body and that she only thought she was Annie because some of the body's memories remained. The real Annie committed suicide after discovering that she was pregnant with the baby of her Catholic priest, as the two had an illicit love affair. The witch had granted Lillian's wish to come back to life and return to Mark's side, offering Ondine's life in exchange. She also recalls memories of herself using Caroline's laudanum to poison Ondine. Horrified, Annie/Lillian tells Mark everything and while initially skeptical, Mark eventually believes that she is genuine. The two decide to sink the Britannic, as Ondine will only be safe once they are both dead. Before she dies alongside Mark, Annie/Lillian raises the alarm so that the patients and staff can escape to survival.

== Publication history ==
The Deep was first published in the United Kingdom on March 5, 2020, through Bantam Press in hardcover format. It was released in the United States five days later through G. P. Putnam's Sons, also in hardcover. It was released in ebook format in the United Kingdom and United States through Transworld Digital and G. P. Putnam's Sons, respectively. An audiobook adaptation narrated by Jane Collingwood was released alongside the print versions in the United Kingdom and United States, both through Penguin Audio.

== Reception ==
The Deep received reviews from outlets such as Publishers Weekly and Culturefly, both of which praised Katsu's writing. The novel's characters and atmosphere were praised in multiple reviews, with The New Indian Express stating that "We know, already, that these ships are going to sink, but we’re still caught up in the immersive luxury world of the Titanic as the story unfolds."
