= The Straw Men =

2002 crime novel by Michael Marshall Smith

- First edition (publ. HarperCollins)
- Author: Michael Marshall
- Language: English
- Publication date: 2002

The Straw Men is a 2002 crime novel by British writer Michael Marshall. It is the first part of a trilogy.

Marshall has previously published some science fiction titles under the name Michael Marshall Smith, but following in the footsteps of Iain Banks and Brian Aldiss, Marshall has decided to swap names to denote a switch in genre.

== Plot ==
The Straw Men is a book about serial killers. It opens with a scene set in a small American town, where a duo of gunmen open fire in a busy McDonald's fast food franchise.

The remainder of the book jumps between two storylines. The first is a first person narrative piece telling us about Ward Hopkins, a young man going home to bury his parents after they suffered a car accident. He encounters a video tape in the family home that suggests that maybe they are still alive. Investigations are pursued with and things quickly spiral as they typically tend to do. A friend who happens to be a CIA operative is enlisted to provide someone to crack wise with.

The second strand is in conventional third person and concerns John Zandt, an ex-homicide detective who is persuaded to come out of early retirement since it appears that the psycho who abducted his daughter has found another victim.

== Adaptations ==
The book has been adapted into a comic book by Zenescope Entertainment.
