= Debbie Viguié =

American author (born 1973)

- Occupation: Author
- Writing career
- Language: English
- Notable work: Wicked series
- Website: debbieviguie.com

Debbie Viguié (born 1973) is an American author, known for co-writing the Wicked series with Nancy Holder.

== Bibliography ==
- Scarlet Moon (2004)
- Charmed: Pied Piper (2004)
- Midnight Pearls (2006)
- Violet Eyes (2010)
- The Rules (June 2015) (made with Nancy Holder)

=== Crusade ===
1. Crusade (2010) (with Nancy Holder)
2. Damned (2011) (with Nancy Holder)
3. Vanquished (2012) (with Nancy Holder)

=== Kiss trilogy ===
1. Kiss of Night (2011)
2. Kiss of Death (2012)
3. Kiss of Revenge (2013)

=== Psalm 23 Mysteries ===
1. The Lord is My Shepherd (2010)
2. I Shall Not Want (2010)
3. Lie Down in Green Pastures (2011)
4. Beside Still Waters (2012)
5. Restoreth My Soul (Mar 2013)
6. In the Paths of Righteousness (Aug 2013)
7. For His Name's Sake (Sept 2013)
8. Walk Through the Valley (2014)
9. The Shadow of Death (2014)
10. I Will Fear No Evil (2014)
11. Thou Art With Me (2015)
12. Thy Rod and Thy Staff (2015)
13. Comfort Me (2017)
14. A Table Before Me (2017)
15. In the Presence of Mine Enemies (2018)
16. Anointest My Head with Oil (2019)

=== Robin Hood: Demon's Bane ===
1. Mark of the Black Arrow (August 2015) (with James R. Tuck)
2. The Two Torcs (August 2016) (with James R. Tuck)
3. Sovereign's War (August 2017) (with James R. Tuck)

=== Sweet Seasons ===
1. The Summer of Cotton Candy (2008)
2. The Fall of Candy Corn (2008)
3. The Winter of Candy Canes (2008)
4. The Spring of Candy Apples (2009)

=== Tex Ravencroft Adventures ===
1. The Tears of Poseidon (2014) (with Dr. Scott C. Viguié)
2. The Brotherhood of Lies (2015) (with Dr. Scott C. Viguié)

=== Wicked ===
1. Witch (2002) (with Nancy Holder)
2. Curse (2002) (with Nancy Holder)
3. Legacy (2003) (with Nancy Holder)
4. Spellbound (2003) (with Nancy Holder)
5. Resurrection (2009) (with Nancy Holder)

=== Witch Hunt ===
1. The Thirteenth Sacrifice (2012)
2. The Last Grave (2013)
3. Circle of Blood (2014)

=== Wolf Springs Chronicles ===
1. Unleashed (2011) (with Nancy Holder)
2. Hot Blooded (2012) (with Nancy Holder)
3. Savage (2013) (with Nancy Holder)

=== Short stories and essays ===
- Charmed: the Modern Fairy Tale (2005, published in Totally Charmed: Demons, Whitelighters, and the Power of Three)
- Passing (2009) (with Nancy Holder)
- Glamour (2011, published in Chicks in Capes)
- Kiss of Life (2013)

=== Audio Theater ===
- Doctor Geek's Laboratory (2012–2016)

=== Non-fiction ===
- Battlefield Victory: Winning the War Against Satan (Dec. 2013)
