= Glen Hirshberg =

American author (born 1966)

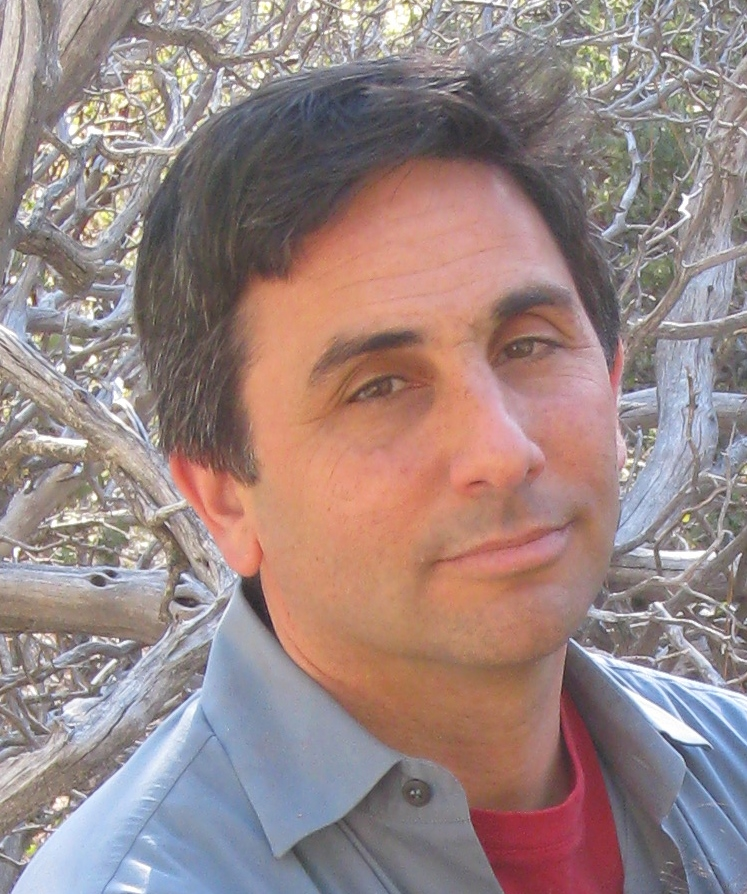
- Hirshberg in 2014
- Born: Glen Martin Hirshberg; June 5, 1966 (age 60); Royal Oak, Michigan, U.S.
- Education: Columbia University (BA); University of Montana (MA, MFA)
- Occupations: Novelist; writer; teacher
- Writing career
- Genre: Horror
- Notable awards: Shirley Jackson Award, International Horror Guild Award
- Website: www.glenhirshberg.com

Glen Martin Hirshberg (born June 5, 1966 in Royal Oak, a suburb of Detroit, Michigan) is an American author best known for horror fiction.

== Biography ==
Born to parents Linda Hirshberg (psychologist) and Jerry Hirshberg (painter, founder of Nissan Design International, and author of The Creative Priority), Hirshberg began telling stories at the age of three. "My mother was a psychologist, my father a designer and painter, and I think their influence still resonates through everything I write. I can’t draw a straight line, but I love painting with the language, and what interests me most in stories, even the spooky ones, is the way people respond to and discover one another as their lives unfold or unravel." Hirshberg was ten years old in 1976 when the Oakland County Child Killer began to kidnap and kill children in his neighborhood. This formative experience finds outlet in the plot of Hirshberg's first novel The Snowman's Children which, as Publishers Weekly relates, is the story of an adult coming to terms with his "1970s suburban childhood. In the winter of 1977, a serial killer dubbed "The Snowman" haunted a quiet Michigan neighborhood, preying on the town's children." In 1980, Hirshberg moved with his family to Southern California when his father, Jerry Hirshberg, took a job with Nissan Design. Hirshberg graduated from Torrey Pines High School before earning his B.A. from Columbia University in 1988, where he won the Bennett Cerf Prize, and his M.A. and M.F.A. from the University of Montana in Missoula in 1991. Hirshberg then moved to Seattle where he worked as a music critic and writer for the Seattle Weekly among other publications. He currently teaches and lives with his family in the Los Angeles area.

== Career ==
His works include the novel The Snowman's Children, published in limited edition by Earthling Publications and reissued for wider distribution in 2002 by Carroll & Graf, a short story collection The Two Sams, published in 2003 by Carroll & Graf; the collection American Morons, published in 2006 by Earthling Publications; the collection The Janus Tree, published in 2012 by Subterranean Press; the novel The Book of Bunk, published in 2010 by Earthling Publications, and the novel Motherless Child which was first published in a limited run by Earthling in 2012. This book sold out before publication and was reissued for wider distribution in May, 2014 by Tor Books as the initial book of a trilogy. The second book of the trilogy Good Girls was released February, 2016, and the third book of the series is in progress.

The Two Sams received an International Horror Guild Award for Outstanding Collection in 2003 and was selected as a Publishers Weekly Best Book for that same year. In addition, The Two Sams was also nominated for the 2004 World Fantasy Award for Best Collection. Stories in the collection were also very well received. "Mr. Dark's Carnival" was nominated for the 2000 International Horror Guild Award for Long Story. and was a World Fantasy nominee for Best Novella of the year in 2001. "Dancing Men" won an International Horror Guild Award for Mid-Length Fiction in 2003 and was nominated for the World Fantasy Award for Best Novella in 2004. "Struwwelpeter," was nominated in the Best Novella category for the World Fantasy Award in 2002.

The collection American Morons was nominated for the 2007 World Fantasy Award for Best Collection and for the Bram Stoker Award for Fiction Collection. It received an International Horror Guild Award for Outstanding Collection in 2006; "The Muldoon," one of the stories from that collection, was also nominated for the 2006 International Horror Guild Award for Mid-Length Fiction. The collection The Janus Tree was a finalist for a 2011 Shirley Jackson Award. Its titular story, "The Janus Tree," was nominated for a 2007 International Horror Guild Award for Mid-Length Fiction and awarded a 2007 Shirley Jackson Award. The novel Motherless Child earned critical acclaim (the Los Angeles Review of Books states: “Always one of his generation’s finest stylists, its most able students of character, [Hirshberg] has written one of the best books of the year.”) and earned both a Booklist and a Publishers Weekly starred review.

With Peter Atkins and Dennis Etchison, Hirshberg co-founded the Rolling Darkness Revue, a reading and dramatic production which appears (like the carnival in "Mr. Dark's Carnival") in different venues and with appearances by different horror authors every year. Stories from the Rolling Darkness Revue (2005–Present) have been anthologized by Earthling Publications.

== Publications ==
=== Novels ===
- Motherless Children Trilogy
1. 2014 Motherless Child (expanded and revised) (Tor)
2. 2016 Good Girls (Tor)
3. 2018 Nothing to Devour (Tor)
- 2012 Motherless Child (Earthling)
- 2010 The Book of Bunk (Earthling); reprinted 2012 (Ash-Tree)
- 2002 The Snowman's Children (Carroll and Graf); special edition 2007 (Earthling). Awards and nominations: International Horror Guild nominee, 2002.

=== Collections ===
- 2018 The Ones Who Are Waving (Cemetery Dance)
- 2012 The Janus Tree and Other Stories (Subterranean Press).
- 2006 American Morons (Earthling). Awards and nominations: 2006 International Horror Guild Award; 2006 Stoker Award nominee; 2007 World Fantasy Award nominee
- 2003 The Two Sams: Ghost Stories (Carroll and Graf). Awards and nominations: 2003 International Horror Guild Award; 2004 World Fantasy Award nominee

=== Novellas and Novelettes ===
- 2014 "Hexenhaus." Dark Discoveries 29.
- 2012 "His Only Audience." Rolling Darkness Revue 2012: The Raven of October. Reprinted as "His Only Audience: A Normal and Nadine Adventure." 2013 The Mammoth Book of Best New Horror 24.
- 2012 "You Become the Neighborhood." 2012 The Janus Tree and Other Stories. Reprinted The Best Horror of the Year: Volume 4.
- 2011 "After-Words." Cemetery Dance #65. Reprinted 2012 The Janus Tree and Other Stories, Year's Best Dark Fantasy and Horror 2012.
- 2009 "The Pikesville Buffalo." Poe: 19 New Tales of Suspense, Dark Fantasy and Horror. Reprinted 2012 The Janus Tree and Other Stories.
- 2007 "The Janus Tree." Inferno: New Tales of Terror and the Supernatural. Awards and nominations: 2007 Shirley Jackson Award; 2007 International Horror Guild nominee. Reprinted 2012 The Janus Tree and Other Stories.
- 2006 "The Muldoon." American Morons. Awards and nominations: 2006 International Horror Guild Award nominee. Reprinted 2007 Year's Best Fantasy and Horror 20, 2010 People of the Book: A Decade of Jewish Science Fiction and Fantasy, 2012 Ghosts: Recent Hauntings.
- 2006 "Devil's Smile." Alone on the Darkside: Echoes from Shadows of Horror. 2006 American Morons, 2007 Mammoth Book of Best New Horror 18, 2010 Mammoth Book of the Best of the Best New Horror, 2011 Very Best of Best of New Horror.
- 2004 "Safety Clowns." Acquainted with the Night. Reprinted 2005 Mammoth Book of Best New Horror 16, 2006 American Morons, 2014 Darker Magazine (Russian translation).
- 2003 "Dancing Men." The Dark: New Ghost Stories. Awards and nominations: 2003 International Horror Guild Award; 2004 World Fantasy Award nominee. Reprinted 2003 Two Sams, 2004 Year's Best Fantasy and Horror 17, 2004 Mammoth Book of Best New Horror 15, 2010 Darkness: Two Decades of Modern Horror.
- 2003 "Flowers on Their Bridles, Hooves in the Air." SciFi.com. Reprinted 2004 Mammoth Book of New Terror, 2006 American Morons.
- 2003 "Shipwreck Beach." Trampoline. Reprinted 2003 Two Sams.
- 2001 "Struwwelpeter." Scifi.com. Awards and nominations: World Fantasy nominee. Reprinted 2002 Year's Best Fantasy and Horror 15, 2002 Mammoth Book of New Horror 13, 2003 Two Sams, 2011 Halloween, 2012.
- 2000 "Mr. Dark's Carnival." Awards and nominations: Stoker Award preliminary nominee; International Horror Guild Award nominee; World Fantasy Award nominee. Reprinted 2001 Year's Best Fantasy and Horror 14, 2003 Two Sams, 2004 Mr. Dark's Carnival Earthling Halloween edition, 2012 The Century's Best Horror Fiction, 2013 Ténèbres: 18 Nouvelles de Fantastique & d'Horror, 2014 October Dreams 2.

=== Short fiction ===
- 2016 "Freedom is Space for the Spirit", A Tor.Com Original
- 2015 "The Ones Who Are Waving: A Last Rolling Darkness Revue Story." The Rolling Darkness Revue 2015: The Voyage of the Dead.
- 2013 "Pride." (AKA "Pride: A Collector's Tale") Rolling Darkness Revue 2013: The Impostor's Monocle. Reprinted 2014 The Year's Best Dark Fantasy and Horror 2014.
- 2010 "People Who Can't." Clocktower.
- 2010 "Shomer." Rolling Darkness Revue 2010: Curtain Call. Reprinted 2010 The Best Horror of the Year: Volume Three, 2012 The Janus Tree and Other Stories.
- 2009 "The Nimble Men." Rolling Darkness Revue 2009: Bartlett: A Centenary Symposium. Reprinted 2010 Best Horror of the Year: Volume Two, Pseudopod #210, 2011 The Milan Review of Ghosts, 2012 The Janus Tree and Other Stories.
- 2008 "Like Lick-em Sticks, Like Tina Fey." Rolling Darkness Revue 2008: Welcome to the Ether. Reprinted 2010 Shivers VI, 2012 The Janus Tree and Other Stories, 2014 Postscripts to Darkness.
- 2008 "Esmerelda" (AKA "Esmerelda: The First Book Depository Story"). Reprinted 2008 Shades of Darkness, 2009 Best Horror of the Year: Volume One, 2012 The Janus Tree and Other Stories.
- 2007 "Miss Ill-Kept Runt." Rolling Darkness Revue 2007: Twilight Limited Reprinted 2008 Mammoth Book of Best New Horror 19, 2012 The Janus Tree and Other Stories. 2015 The Monstrous.
- 2007 "I Am Coming to Live in Your Mouth." Dark Delicacies II: Fear. Reprinted 2012 The Janus Tree and Other Stories, Nightmare Magazine #18.
- 2006 "Sisters of Baikal (excerpt)." Cemetery Dance #56.
- 2006 "Transitway." Cemetery Dance #56. Reprinted 2006 American Morons.
- 2006 "Millwell." Rolling Darkness Revue 2006: At the Sign of the Snowman's Skull. Reprinted 2007 Summer Chills: Tales of Vacation Horror, 2012 The Janus Tree and Other Stories
- 2005 "American Morons." Rolling Darkness Revue 2005: Darkness Rising. Reprinted 2006 Year's Best Fantasy and Horror 19, 2006 American Morons, 2006 Mammoth Book of Best New Horror 17.
- 2004 "Like a Lily in a Flood." Cemetery Dance #50, Reprinted 2006 American Morons
- 2002 "The Two Sams." Dark Terrors 6. Reprinted 2003 Mammoth Book of Best New Horror 14, 2003 Two Sams, 2008 Poe's Children, 2015 Darker Terrors.

=== Essays ===
- 2013 "Forward" Fear and Learning: Essays on the Pedagogy of Horror
- 2011 "Introduction" Rumours of the Marvellous
- 2006 "Roll, Dark" Cemetery Dance #56
- 2006 "Glen Hirshberg Bibliography" Cemetery Dance #56 (with Rick Kleffel)
- 2006 "Story Notes" American Morons
- 2004 "Introduction" Mr. Dark's Carnival Earthling Halloween edition
