= Crota =

1996 horror novel by Owl Goingback

- Author: Owl Goingback
- Genre: Horror
- Set in: Missouri, USA
- Publication date: 17 April 1996
- Publication place: United States
- Pages: 304
- ISBN: 1-55611-480-X

Crota is a 1996 horror novel by Owl Goingback. It is the author's debut novel. It won the 1996 Bram Stoker Award for Best First Novel and was nominated for the 1996 Bram Stoker Award for Best Novel.

== Plot ==
In Hobbs County, Missouri, two citizens are killed and dismembered by a large creature. The local sheriff Skip Harding investigates. Game warden Jay Little Hawk finds a mutilated deer in the woods and notes that a recent earthquake has altered the Devil's Boot cave, opening a new tunnel. Hawk senses an evil presence in the cave and flees.

An ancient beast known as the Crota has been awakened by the earthquake. It slaughters a herd of cattle and a farmer. While investigating, Harding is attacked by the creature. He is injured but chases it away with his cigarette lighter. Harding tells hospital staff and fellow officers about the monster, but they assume he was attacked by a bear.

Little Hawk arrives at the hospital and relates the legend of the Crota to Lloyd, Harding's deputy. Lloyd does not believe Little Hawk; he decides that killing the bear will allow him to defeat Harding in the next election. Lloyd takes a group of officers into the Devil's Boot on a bear hunt. They discover an underground city. The officers split up to explore; most are attacked and killed by the Crota. Harding leaves the hospital and goes to Devil's Boot. Lloyd radios to Harding, telling him to talk to Little Hawk before Lloyd loses radio contact.

Meanwhile, Little Hawk consults with a group of Lakota elders including George Strongeagle. Strongeagle agrees to help Little Hawk defeat the Crota. Harding meets with Little Hawk, who reveals that it wasn't Harding's cigarette lighter that scared the Crota away. Instead, it was an amulet that Harding inherited from his Native American grandmother. Harding, Little Hawk, and Strongeagle perform a sweat lodge ceremony, where they learn that “white men’s weapons” will not work against the Crota. The spirit of Harding's grandmother leads him to a foxskin bundle, which contains three Cheyenne arrows that can kill magical creatures.

The group journeys through the cave to the underground city. Lloyd is killed by the Crota, while Little Hawk is injured. Harding uses his grandmother's arrows to kill the monster. Little Hawk and Strongeagle decide to return to their reservations. Harding decides to retire as sheriff.

== Reception and awards ==
Publishers Weekly wrote that the "energy of a grade-B monster movie pervades Goingback's debut novel. So do that genre's cliches, including the tired theme of the Indian curse." The review criticized the author's "stale prose" but praised the accounts of Indian legends, which "have the flavor of the authentic oral tradition". The review concludes that "Goingback keeps the action brisk and knows where to put the necessary lucky coincidence or happy twist to distract readers from his tale's unwavering simplicity."

A review for Kirkus stated that the novel's premise was similar to, but less appealing than, the 1995 Christian crossover novel The Oath by Frank Peretti. The review further stated that "Goingback is readable and his Choctaw lore appealing. But his story quickly drops into the banal suspense of a Dean Koontz or Clive Barker. He isn't, however, any worse."

The novel won the 1993 Bram Stoker Award for Best First Novel and was nominated for the 1993 Bram Stoker Award for Best Novel.
