= Bloodstained Oz =

2006 novella by Christopher Golden and James A. Moore

- Bloodstained Oz cover
- Author: Christopher Golden & James A. Moore
- Illustrator: Glenn Chadbourne
- Cover artist: Glenn Chadbourne
- Language: English
- Genre: Horror fiction
- Published: 2006 Earthling Publications
- Publication place: United States
- Media type: Print (hardcover)
- Pages: 116 pp (US hardcover edition)
- ISBN: 0-9766339-6-5
- OCLC: 70133181

Bloodstained Oz is a Wizard of Oz-related horror novella by Christopher Golden and James A. Moore, and it was illustrated by Glenn Chadbourne. It was published as a limited edition hardcover by Earthling Publications in 2006. It comes with an introduction by Ray Garton.

It was nominated for the Horror Writers Association's Bram Stoker Award for Best Long Fiction in 2006.

The story falls outside of L. Frank Baum's original storyline for his Wonderful Wizard of Oz series and its official sequels. Being outside of the canonical restrictions, Bloodstained Oz makes the Land of Oz a nightmare for adults instead of a children's story.

Both first editions of Bloodstained Oz were sold out very soon after publication, and there are no current plans to reprint it by Earthling Publications or any other publisher. Being an Oz related book and a horror novel have made it a collector's item. Copies have been sold on eBay for $300.00 or more.

== Plot ==
1930s Dust Bowl Kansas natives and an alternate version of the Wonderful Land of Oz collide during a huge dust storm. The Scarecrow, the Tin Woodman, and the Cowardly Lion may or may not help them on this adventure because the other inhabitants of Oz include vampire flying monkeys, emerald eyed demonic creatures, and other horrors beyond imagination.

Down home farm girl Gayle Franklin and her family, escaped convict Hank Burnside, and Roma gypsies Elisa and Stefan along with their infant son Jeremiah, all find themselves face to face with the unbelievable terrors from Oz. The creatures have taken over Oz and now they are threatening to take over Earth too.

== Editions ==
Bloodstained Oz was only available in two limited first editions:

1. 500 numbered limited edition hardcovers, signed by Christopher Golden and James A. Moore. ISBN 0-9766339-6-5
2. 26 lettered limited edition hardcovers (A - Z), signed by Christopher Golden, James A. Moore, Ray Garton, and Glenn Chadbourne. It is housed in a handmade traycase featuring 1 of 26 matted original color illustrations of the Tin Woodsman by Glenn Chadbourne.

== See also ==
- List of Oz books
- The Wonderful Wizard of Oz

== Links and references ==
- Official web page for Bloodstained Oz
- Review at Green Man Review
- 5 out of 5 star review from Insidious Reflections
- Bloodstained Oz review at Monsters and Critics.com
- Bram Stoker Award nominees 2006, also as a PDF
