= Joe McKinney (author) =

American novelist

- Born: Joe Clayton McKinney Jr. September 22, 1968; San Antonio, Texas, U.S.
- Died: July 13, 2021 (aged 52)
- Occupations: Author, police sergeant
- Writing career
- Years active: 2005 – July 13, 2021
- Notable works: Dead World series: Dead City, Apocalypse of the Dead, Flesh Eaters and Mutated; Dog Days and Plague of the Undead
- Website: joemckinney.wordpress.com

Joe McKinney (born September 22, 1968 – July 13, 2021) was a San Antonio–based author and Patrol Supervisor with the San Antonio Police Department.

== Career ==
McKinney was an author in many genres, including horror, ghost stories, virus thrillers, crime and science fiction. Over his career, he wrote thirteen novels, developed two collections of short stories, created a tale for a comic book, and was both published in and edited numerous anthologies. He was also a regular contributor to the online true crime magazine, In Cold Blog.

In addition, McKinney was a sergeant with the San Antonio Police Department as the patrol supervisor for the west side of San Antonio. Previous to that, he was a homicide detective and disaster mitigation specialist. He also helped run the city's 911 dispatch center.

Many of his works contain a strong procedural element and a level of realism based on his years of law enforcement. He addressed some of the prejudice against female officers, both from the public and from their fellow officer in his novels Quarantined and Flesh Eaters. In Inheritance, he included more in-station activities between police officers.

In The Savage Dead (2013), McKinney addressed the border relations between the United States and Mexico. Mixing the genres of political thriller, military special ops thriller, and zombie gorefest, the novel tackles this complex topic from a number of different angles.

His first Young Adult publication, Dog Days, was released in 2013 as part of Journalstone's Doubledown Series, Book III, paired with Sanford Allen's Deadly Passage. Noted as a coming of age novel, Max, the 14-year-old narrator of Dog Days, spends the summer of 1983 facing the worst hurricane the suburbs of Houston have endured in memory, as well as the possibility of a supernatural killer. Dog Days won the Bram Stoker Award for Best Young Adult Novel.

A lifelong Texan, McKinney enjoyed exploring the history of South Texas, legends of famous and/or little known outlaws, and the mysteries of long unsolved crimes.

== Personal life ==
McKinney died in his sleep July 13, 2021. He is survived by his wife and two daughters.

== Awards ==
Work	Year & Award	Category	Result	Ref.
Quarantined	2009 Bram Stoker Award	Novel	Nominated	
Apocalypse of the Dead (Deadworld #2)	2010 Bram Stoker Award	Novel	Nominated	
Dead Set: A Zombie Anthology (with Michelle McCrary)	2010 Black Quill Awards	Dark Genre Anthology	Nominated	
Dead Set: A Zombie Anthology (with Michelle McCrary)	2011 Independent Publisher Book Awards	Horror	Bronze	
Flesh Eaters (Deadworld #3)	2011 Bram Stoker Award	Novel	Won	
Inheritance	2012 Bram Stoker Award	Novel	Nominated	
Lost Girl of the Lake	2012 Bram Stoker Award	Long Fiction	Nominated	
Bury My Heart at Marvin Gardens	2012 Bram Stoker Award	Short Fiction	Nominated	
Dog Days	2012 Bram Stoker Award	Young Adult Novel	Won	
Lost and Found	2012 Bram Stoker Award	Long Fiction	Nominated	

== Bibliography ==
McKinney was the author of, or a contributor to, thirty books.

Dead World series

- Dead City (Dead World #1) (2006) ISBN 978-0-7860-1781-2
- Apocalypse of the Dead (Dead World #2) (2010) ISBN 978-0-7860-2359-2
- Flesh Eaters (Dead World #3) (2011) ISBN 978-0-7860-2360-8
- Mutated (Dead World #4) (2012) ISBN 978-0-7860-2929-7
- Survivors (Dead World short story) (2010)
- Dating in a Dead World (Dead World short story) (2010)
- The Crossing (Dead World short story) (2012) ISBN 978-0-9847394-4-8

Deadlands

- Plague of the Undead (The Deadlands #1) (2014) ISBN 978-0786033973
- The Dead Won't Die (The Deadlands #2) (2015) ISBN 978-0786033997

The Retreat

- Pandemic – (Co-Authored with Craig DiLouie and Stephen Knight) (2013) ASIN B00GQOG166
- Slaughterhouse - (Co-Authored with Stephen Knight and Craig DiLouie) (2014) ASIN B00K3BRRDY
- Die Laughing - (Co-Authored with Stephen Knight and Craig DiLouie) (2015)
- Alamo - (Co-Authored with Stephen Knight and Craig DiLouie) (2016)

Novels

- Quarantined (2009) - ISBN 978-1-897370-65-0
- Dodging Bullets (2010) ISBN 978-0-9826887-1-7
- The Red Empire (2011) - ISBN 978-0-9832211-5-9
- Inheritance (2012) - ISBN 978-0615690896
- Crooked House (2013) - ISBN 978-1937128432
- The Savage Dead (2013) - ISBN 978-0786029303

Collections/Anthologies

- The Sound of Horror – (as editor & contributor) (2007) ISBN 978-0-9797000-0-2
- The Red Empire and Other Stories (2012)
- Dog Days (2014)
- Speculations (2018)
- Dead Set: A Zombie Anthology – (Editor with Michelle McCrary) (2010) - ISBN 978-0-9801850-9-6
- Dog Days/Deadly Passage – (Dual Publication with Sanford Allen) (2013) - ISBN 978-1940161129
- The Forsaken: Stories of Abandoned Places (with Mark Onspaugh) (2017)

As Contributor

- The Phantom Chronicles 2 (2009) ISBN 978-1-933076-57-7
- The Weaponer (contributed to introduction) (2010) ISBN 978-1-926712-70-3
- Help! Wanted (2011) ISBN 978-0615536354
- End of Days 5: An Apocalyptic Anthology(2011) ISBN 978-1611990157
- The Green Hornet Casefiles (2011) ISBN 978-1-933076-94-2
- Book of Horror 2 (2011) ISBN 978-1-935458-99-9
- Best New Zombie Tales Vol.3 (2011)
- Horror For Good: A Charitable Anthology (Volume 1) (2012) ISBN 978-1-475065-36-7
- Zombie Writing! (2012) ISBN 978-1469931470
- Nightmare Stalkers & Dream Walkers (2013) ISBN 9781291590012
- Blood Rites: An Invitation to Horror (2014) ISBN 978-0984978274
- Nightmare Stalkers & Dream Walkers (2014) ISBN 9781291590012
- Corrupts Absolutely? Dark Metahuman Fiction (2015) ISBN 9781941987421

Short Fiction

- Coyote Season (2006)
- The Millstone (2006)
- Skinwalker (2006)
- The Gunner's Love Song (2007)
- Starvation Army (2007)
- Down in the Cellar (2009)
- Sabbatical in the Ohio Methlands (2009)
- Blemish (2010)
- The Day the Music Died (2011)
- Burning Finger Man (2011)
- Resurrecting Mindy (2011)
- Dodging Bullets (2011)
- The Little Church of Safe Crossing (2011)
- Death and the Magi (2011)
- Bury My Heart at Marvin Gardens (2012)
- Hero (2012)
- Jimmy Finder (2012)
- Lost Girl of the Lake (Co-Authored with Mike McCarty) (2014) ISBN 978-0985194048
- Empty Room (2012)
- Eyes Open (2012)
- The Old Man Under the Sea (2012)
- A Little Crimson Stain (2012)
- The Night Visitor (2012)
- Ghost Town (2012)
- Dog Days (2013)
- A Grave Matter (2013)
- She Grew a Pair (2013)
- Acclimation Package (2013)
- The Woman Who Collected McCammon (2013)
- Among Men (2013)
- Exclusive Excerpt from "The Savage Dead" (2013)
- Do No Harm (2013)
- The Sixth Mission (2013)
- Mr. Creator (2013)
- Swallowed (2013)
- Writing for Exposure (2013)
- Lost and Found (Limbus, Inc.) (2014)
- More Than Watchmen Wait for the Dawn (2014)
- Tenochtitlan Will Rise (2014)
- Oh Fuck, It's the Cops (2014)
- Pete's Big Break (2014)
- Mother (2015)
- The Man Who Started It All (2015)
- The Shed (2016)
- Growth Spurt (2016)
- The Greatest Gift of All (2018)
- A Heap of Broken Images (2019)
- Terror of Bristol Plains (with Michael McCarty) (2019)
