= The Hunger (Katsu novel) =

2018 horror novel by Alma Katsu

- Author: Alma Katsu
- Language: English
- Genre: Historical fiction; horror
- Publisher: Putnam
- Publication date: 6 Mar 2018
- Publication place: United States
- Pages: 384
- ISBN: 978-0-7352-1251-0

The Hunger is a 2018 historical horror novel by Alma Katsu. It is a reimagining of the events of the Donner Party which includes supernatural elements. It received critical praise and was nominated for the 2018 Bram Stoker Award for Best Novel as well as the 2019 Locus Award for Best Horror Novel.

== Plot ==
In a prologue set in April 1847, a scouting party is sent to find the last survivors of the Donner Party, including Lewis Keseberg. They find a cabin surrounded by human bones.

In early 1846, the Donner Party begins their journey near Springfield, Illinois. The story gradually reveals that many members of the wagon train are fleeing events from their past. George Donner's wife Tamsen has had multiple affairs. His daughter Elitha hears the voices of spirits. Medically trained Edwin Bryant hopes to interview Native Americans regarding a supernatural disease. James Reed was having an affair with another man; he fled when his affair partner demanded hush money. Charles Stanton is haunted by the death of his fiancée Lydia, who committed suicide.

From the beginning, horror seems to follow the party; a young boy disappears and his mutilated corpse is found several miles down the road. Bryant leaves the group, pursuing rumors about a demon haunting Truckee Lake. Tamsen Donner and Stanton begin an affair, but he later leaves Tamsen in favor of the younger Mary Graves. The party decides to follow a new trail, which turns out to be more difficult than expected. They find several human corpses along the way and suspect that they are being followed by wolves or bears. Caravan member Luke Halloran claims that he is starving and attacks Tamsen; she stabs him to death. Tamsen and her daughters see frightening creatures in the dark; however, the men do not believe them.

James Reed has an affair with a teamster named Snyder. When Reed ends the affair, Snyder threatens to tell Reed's wife. Reed stabs Snyder to death. Keseberg wants to hang Reed, but he is ultimately banished from the caravan.

By November, the party has become snowbound in the Sierra Nevada. Most of them camp by Truckee Lake. The Donners lag behind and camp by Alder Creek. At Truckee Lake, a disease outbreak causes several pioneers go insane, killing and eating their companions. Keseberg begins to sexually assault the children at Truckee Lake, including Elitha Donner. When Elitha's lover Thomas intervenes, Keseberg arranges to have him killed.

Stanton decides to flee. He and several others, including Mary Graves, make snowshoes and attempt to reach safety in California as members of the “Forlorn Hope”. Stanton is attacked by a half-man, half-beast; he is seriously injured and infected with the madness. Mary Graves and the others are forced to abandon him in the snow. He commits suicide rather than waiting to be eaten.

Bryant explores an abandoned prospecting camp which contains several mutilated skeletons. He learns that the Keseberg family was involved. In a flashback, it is revealed that the men of the Keseberg family are “cursed” with a disease that causes them to become violent and hunger for human flesh.

George Donner dies at Alder Creek. Tamsen and her children trek to Truckee Lake. Keseberg admits that he has encouraged the survivors there to cannibalize the corpses of those who have starved. He is holding the monsters at bay by feeding them pieces of the corpses as well. He admits that he is a carrier of the disease; he will not transform into a monster, but he can pass the disease to others. Tamsen knows that there is not enough meat for the others to survive until the snow melts. She offers to let Keseberg kill her and feed her to the survivors in order to save her daughters.

By March 1847, James Reed has gathered the first rescue party. He saves his daughter and several other survivors. The book ends with more rescue parties on the way.

== Reception ==
Publishers Weekly gave the novel a starred review, calling it "a brilliant retelling" and adding that "fans of Dan Simmons’s The Terror will find familiar and welcome chills." Alison Flood of The Guardian called The Hunger "an absorbing, menacing thriller" as well as "a nerve-jangling, persuasive story of survival and desperation".

Steph Cha of USA Today gave the novel 3.5 out of 4 stars, particularly praising Katsu's "sharp, haunting language" and "acute understanding of human nature". The review noted that the supernatural elements "almost relieve the tension and horror of the story" with "some of the darkness pushed onto external threats, or disproportionately contained in one sociopathic villain."

Kirkus called the novel "two-thirds of a terrific book". Their review stated that "Katsu creates a riveting drama of power struggles and shifting alliances", while the characters' intertwined narratives "create a sense of claustrophobia, a feeling that the coming tragedy isn’t just an accident of bad weather and poor leadership, but a matter of fate." Nevertheless, the review stated that the "final act of the novel ... fails to deliver" and that "the cannibalism—the thing that makes the Donner Party the Donner Party in history and popular consciousness—becomes boring".

Writing for Locus, John Langan called the novel a great example of historical fiction which "impart[s] a vivid immediacy to past events, making them live in the reader’s mind, allowing her to draw near to them." Langan also praises Katsu for avoiding the trope of "the supernatural threat to the European settlers functioning as a stand-in for the native peoples". Instead, Katsu links the disease to earlier incursions by settlers, and "the ravenously hungry monsters emerge as a trope for the appetites that drove many of the settlers to leave their homes and join the wagon train". Also writing for Locus, Stefan Dziemianowicz praised the way in which Katsu fleshes out the historical narrative, "providing its players with backstories and motivations". This review praised Katsu's decision to frame the hunger in terms of disease rather than a strictly supernatural interpretation, allowing for multiple questions that Katsu leaves "tantalizingly unanswered".

The novel was a finalist for the 2018 Bram Stoker Award for Best Novel and the 2019 Locus Award for Best Horror Novel.
