= Brian A. Hopkins =

American horror writer (born 1960)

- Born: December 29, 1960 (age 65); Altoona, Pennsylvania, United States
- Education: University of Memphis, Oklahoma State University
- Occupation: Electronics engineer
- Writing career
- Genres: Horror fiction Science fiction Mystery fiction Autobiography
- Notable awards: Bram Stoker Award; 2002 El Dia De Los Muertos; 2001 Extremes 2: Fantasy and Horror from the Ends of the Earth; 2000 The Licking Valley Coon Hunters Club; 1999 Five Days in April

Brian A. Hopkins (born December 29, 1960) is an American author. His works include the novel The Licking Valley Coon Hunters Club and the novellas El Dia De Los Muertos and Five Days in April, all of which received Bram Stoker Awards. He edited the Stoker-winning horror anthology Extremes 2: Fantasy and Horror from the Ends of the Earth, as well as four other Extremes anthologies. His works have also been nominated for the Nebula Awards, Theodore Sturgeon Awards, Locus Awards, and International Horror Guild Awards.

== Biography ==
Hopkins was born in Altoona, Pennsylvania, in 1960. He has lived in the Oklahoma City area since 1983. In October 2018, he retired as the deputy director of the 76th Software Engineering Group at Tinker Air Force Base, culminating a 35-year civil service career. He holds a Bachelor of Science Degree in Electrical Engineering (BSEE) from the University of Memphis and a Master of Science Degree in Engineering and Technology Management (MSETM) from Oklahoma State University.

His first short story was published in Dragon in 1990.

In 2001, Hopkins was diagnosed with an indolent form of non-Hodgkin lymphoma, undergoing multiple rounds of chemotherapy over the years, as well as special targeted drug therapies. These health problems were compounded by Hepatitis C, Immune Thrombocytopenia (ITP), and other issues. From the beginning, Hopkins has written extensively about his health challenges in an online journal. In 2023, these journal entries were compiled and published as The Journey: Reflections on Life, Illness, and Death. Most of the entries from 2013 to 2022 maintain the pretense of having been written by Hopkins' miniature schnauzer, Gator.

== Bibliography ==
- Something Haunts Us All (1995)
- Cold at Heart (1997)
- Flesh Wounds (1999)
- The Licking Valley Coon Hunters Club (2000)
- Wrinkles at Twilight* (2000)
- These I Know by Heart (2001)
- Salt Water Tears (2001)
- El Dia de los Muertos (2002)
- Lipstick, Lies, and Lady Luck (2004)
- Phoenix (2013)
- Road’s End and Other Fantasies (2021)
- Escape Velocities (2022)
- The Journey: Reflections on Life, Illness, and Death (2023)
- The Woman of Color's Tale: Buchanan's Curse (2024)

== Awards ==
=== Bram Stoker Awards ===
From 1999 to 2002, Hopkins was nominated for a total of seven Bram Stoker Awards, winning four.

In 1999, his novella Five Days in April, set in the aftermath of the Oklahoma City bombing, tied for the 1999 Bram Stoker Award for Best Long Fiction and was nominated for both a Nebula Award for Best Novelette and a Sturgeon Award for best short science fiction story.

In 2000, he received three Bram Stoker Award nominations. The Licking Valley Coon Hunters Club was nominated for Best Novel and won Best First Novel, defeating a field including Mark Z. Danielewski's House of Leaves. The Hopkins-edited anthology Extremes: Fantasy & Horror from the Ends of the Earth was nominated for Best Anthology but did not win.

In 2001, his second Extremes anthology Extremes 2: Fantasy & Horror from the Ends of the Earth won the Bram Stoker Award for Best Anthology. Along with Garrett Peck, he also co-edited the nonfiction book Personal Demons, which was nominated for a Bram Stoker Award for Best Non-Fiction but did not win.

In 2002, his novella El Dia De Los Muertos tied with Thomas Ligotti's My Work is Not Yet Done for another Bram Stoker Award for Best Long Fiction, defeating a field of nominees that included Neil Gaiman's novella Coraline.

=== Other Awards ===
El Dia De Los Muertos was also nominated for a Locus Award for Best Novella (losing to The Tain by China Miéville) and for an International Horror Guild Award (losing to My Work is Not Yet Done).

Hopkins also wrote two stories which were nominated for 1996 International Horror Guild Awards: the short story "Dead Art" and (with David Niall Wilson) the novella La Belle Dame Sans Merci.
