= Keepers (novel) =

2005 novel by Gary A. Braunbeck

- Author: Gary A. Braunbeck
- Language: English
- Genre: Horror
- Publication date: 2005
- Publication place: United States

Keepers is a 2005 novel by American writer Gary A. Braunbeck. It was nominated for a 2005 Bram Stoker Award for "Superior Achievement in a Novel".

== Plot summary ==
The main character is a shy, lonely, middle-aged man named Gil Stewart. He lives a relatively clean, good, quiet life in Cedar Hill, Ohio, where he owns and runs an antique novelty and collectibles store and also helps to take care of his institutionalized nephew Carson (in a group home), who has Down syndrome.

One evening, while returning home from work, he finds an elderly man on the side of the road wearing a bowler hat. The man's hat gets blown away, and as he runs after it, he gets hit by a car. While that is happening, Gil notices two black mastiffs that seemed to be chasing the man and later witnessing the accident. Gil tries to help him, but the man dies. What disturbed Gil were three things:

- The man, an apparent stranger, knew Gil by name
- Not only did the two mastiffs look like they knew what they were doing, but they also seemed satisfied at the old man's death.
- The man-in-the-bowler-hat says the final words "The Keepers are coming"

When he finally arrives home, he encounters an old, wounded and mangy dog lying in his front lawn, which subsequently crawls under his house.

As he is deciding what to do with the dog (between taking it to a local shelter, the vet, or simply letting it die in peace where it is), he unexpectedly receives a package delivered by an obscure shipping company. To his surprise, the package was apparently sent from Beth, a woman he loved long ago but who mysteriously disappeared and was presumed dead. Gil soon receives a phone call from Carson's group home: Carson is missing.

Gil now is bothered by the following mysteries:

- Who sent that package? Was it from Beth? If so, where was she all these years?
- Where did Carson go?
- Where did that dying dog come from?
- How and why did the dying man know Gil's name?
- Why are those mastiffs roaming around town?

Those questions are answered after going through a bizarre and slightly surreal experience. He is forced to remember many of his repressed experiences of his childhood and young adult years, which, in a convoluted way, are linked to the mysterious incidents involving the old man on the road, the mastiffs, Carson's disappearance, and the mysterious dying stray dog.

The feel of the book is very dark and somber. The majority of the book is composed of flashbacks, with the climax occurring during the present day, when he met the old man and the strange dogs. Even though the novel borders on fantasy, real-life issues are dealt with, namely animal abuse, lost pets, aging, and loneliness.

== Characters ==
- Gil Stewart - the protagonist of the story. Introduced as a mild mannered bachelor, which the reader later discovers he was also a shy, "nerdy" teen. Seems to have a special bond with animals, ever since he was a boy.
- Beth - Gil's close friend and first love. Was Gil's first "girlfriend". Even after their relationship ended, they continued to be friends, and he never gave up his feelings for her. Along with her aunt Mabel, owned several dogs. Mysteriously disappears one night after a tearful and emotional conversation with Gil.
- Gil's Father - a depressed, angry, and alcoholic World War II veteran. An avid movie buff. Dies in a work-related accident while Gil is still in his late teens.
- Gil's Mother - Emotionally distant from Gil. An opera fan. Dies a couple of years after Gil's father passes away, in what Gil speculated was suicide.
- Gil's Sister - was never very close to Gil until she became pregnant with Carson. Eventually dies of a latent heart condition, after which Gil becomes Carson's legal guardian.
- Mabel - Beth's aunt. Works as a nurse at an assisted living facility. Raised Beth as her own child after Beth's mother relocates to London. Is described by Gil as "sad looking."
- Marty "Whitey" Weis - a resident at Mabel's workplace. Uses a wheelchair due to diabetes complications. Develops a close friendship with Gil. His wit and mild cynicism adds a humorous touch to the gloomy feel of the novel. Misses his daughter, an aspiring actress based in Los Angeles who rarely calls him.
- Cheryl - one of Gil's employees at his novelty store. Has a deep appreciation for her boss and is mystified by his loneliness.
- The Bowlers - Led by an individual which Gil refers to as "The Magritte Man", a group of mysterious men in derby hats chasing Gil around town.
- The Twin Mastiffs - roam throughout town and appear to stalk Gil, and are apparently owned by "The Bowlers".
- Long-Lost - a bizarre-looking character from one of Carson's comic books. What Gil finds disturbing is that Carson claims he can speak to him.
