= Gary A. Braunbeck =

American writer (born 1960)

- Born: July 1, 1960 (age 66); Newark, Ohio, U.S.
- Occupations: Writer, author
- Writing career
- Language: English
- Genres: Science fiction, fantasy, mystery, horror
- Website: garybraunbeck.com

Gary A. Braunbeck (born July 1, 1960) is an American science fiction, fantasy, mystery and horror author.

== Biography ==
Braunbeck was born in Newark, Ohio (the city that serves as the model for the fictitious Cedar Hill in many of his stories). He writes in a number of different genres, but principally horror.

Nearly 200 of his short stories have appeared in various publications such as The Magazine of Fantasy & Science Fiction, Cemetery Dance, Sword of Ice and Other Tales of Valdemar, and The Year's Best Fantasy and Horror. Some of his most popular stories are mysteries that have appeared in the Cat Crimes anthology series. In 2007 his story "Rami Temporales" was adapted by Stranger Things into a short film entitled "One of Those Faces" starring Toby Turner.

Braunbeck also taught creative writing at Seton Hill University, Pennsylvania, in theirlow-residency Master of Fine Arts degree program in Writing Popular Fiction.

He has also served as co-editor for the fifth installment of the Masques horror-anthology series created by Jerry Williamson, Masques V. For a time he was also a regular contributor to Everything2 and served briefly as a content editor there.

In 2005–2006, Braunbeck served a term as President of the Horror Writers Association. He was married to Lucy A. Snyder (divorced 2023), a science fiction/fantasy writer. He dubbed the Dreadtime Stories series April Fool.

== Awards ==
His work has received several awards, including the Horror Writers Association Bram Stoker Award for Superior Achievement in Best Short Fiction in 2003 and 2005 for "Duty" and "We Now Pause for Station Identification".

His novella "Kiss of the Mudman" received the International Horror Guild Award for Long Fiction in 2006. That same year, he won a Bram Stoker Award for Best Fiction Collection with his anthology Destinations Unknown, published by Cemetery Dance Publications.

In 2007, he won two Bram Stoker Awards, for Long Fiction with "Afterward, There Will Be a Hallway", and for Anthology with Five Strokes to Midnight (edited with Hank Schwaeble). In 2010 he won their award for nonfiction with To Each Their Darkness, published by Apex Publications. He won the 2013 Bram Stoker Award for Long Fiction with "The Great Pity."

Awards for Gary A. Braunbeck's writing
Year	Title		Award	Result	Ref.
1997	Things Left Behind	Bram Stoker Award	Fiction Collection	Shortlisted	
2000	The Indifference of Heaven	Bram Stoker Award	Best Novel	Shortlisted	
2003	"Duty"	Bram Stoker Award	Short Fiction	Won	
2003	Fear in a Handful of Dust	Bram Stoker Award	Non-Fiction	Shortlisted	
2003	Graveyard People: The Collected Cedar Hill Stories Vol 1	Bram Stoker Award	Fiction Collection	Shortlisted	
2004	"Just Out of Reach"	Bram Stoker Award	Short Fiction	Shortlisted	
2005	In the Midnight Museum	Bram Stoker Award	Long Fiction	Shortlisted	
2005	Keepers	Bram Stoker Award	Best Novel	Shortlisted	
2005	"We Now Pause for Station Identification"	Bram Stoker Award	Short Fiction	Won	
2006	Destinations Unknown	Bram Stoker Award	Fiction Collection	Won	
2006	Prodigal Blues	Bram Stoker Award	Best Novel	Shortlisted	
2007	"Afterward, There Will Be A Hallway"	Bram Stoker Award	Long Fiction	Won	
2007	Five Strokes to Midnight	Bram Stoker Award	Anthology	Won	
2008	Coffin County	Bram Stoker Award	Best Novel	Shortlisted	
2008	Five Strokes to Midnight	World Fantasy Award	Anthology	Shortlisted	
2010	"Return to Mariabronn"	Bram Stoker Award	Short Fiction	Shortlisted	
2010	To Each Their Darkness	Bram Stoker Award	Non-Fiction	Won	
2013	"The Great Pity"	Bram Stoker Award	Long Fiction	Won	
2015	Halfway Down the Stairs	Bram Stoker Award	Fiction Collection	Shortlisted	
2015	"Paper Cuts"	Bram Stoker Award	Long Fiction	Shortlisted	

== Bibliography ==
=== Novels ===
- (1998) Time Was: Isaac Asimov's I-Bots (co-written with Steve Perry)
- (2000) The Indifference of Heaven
- (2000) Dark Matter #1: In Hollow Houses
- (2001) This Flesh Unknown
- (2004) Cedar Hill #1: In Silent Graves
- (2005) We Now Pause for Station Identification
- (2005) In the Midnight Museum
- (2005) Cedar Hill #2: Keepers
- (2006) Prodigal Blues
- (2007) Cedar Hill #3: Mr. Hands
- (2008) Cedar Hill #4: Coffin County
- (2009) Cedar Hill #5: Far Dark Fields

=== Collections ===
- Things Left Behind (1997)
- Escaping Purgatory (2001)
- Sorties, Cathexes, and Personal Effects (2002)
- Graveyard People: The Collected Cedar Hill Stories, Volume 1 (2003)
- X3 (contains three science fiction novellas: "One Brown Mouse", "At Eternity's Gate", and "Palimpsest Day"; 2003)
- A Little Orange Book of Odd Stories (2003)
- From Beneath these Fields of Blood (2004)
- Home Before Dark: The Collected Cedar Hill Stories, Volume 2 (2005)
- Destinations Unknown (2006)
- Smiling Faces Sometimes (2007)
- Cages and Those Who Hold the Keys (2011)
- Rose of Sharon (2013)
- Halfway Down the Stairs (2015)
- There Comes a Midnight Hour (2021)

=== Nonfiction books ===
- (2004) Fear In A Handful Of Dust: Horror As A Way Of Life
- (2010) To Each Their Darkness

=== Books edited ===
- (2006) Masques V (co-edited with Jerry Williamson)
- (2007) Five Strokes to Midnight (co-edited with Hank Schwaeble)
