= S. P. Miskowski =

American horror writer and playwright

- Born: Decatur, Georgia, U.S.
- Education: University of Washington (MFA)

S. P. Miskowski is an American horror writer and playwright.

== Biography ==
S. P. Miskowski was born in Arizona. She later moved to Decatur, Georgia, and eventually settled in the Pacific Northwest. She attended the University of Washington where she completed an MFA. She also was awarded two National Endowment for the Arts Fellowships, and her works have been nominated for three Shirley Jackson Awards as well as a Bram Stoker Award. Her novel I Wish I Was Like You was named This Is Horror 2017 Novel of the Year and won the 2017 Charles Dexter Award.

In University, Miskowski edited a small press. After college she spent about fifteen years writing plays and working as a teacher and editor. Her plays were produced in Seattle but in 2010 she began to write short stories. These have been published by Supernatural Tales, Horror Bound Magazine, Identity Theory, New Times and Fine Madness.

== Bibliography ==
=== Skillute Cycle ===
- Knock Knock (2011)
- Delphine Dodd (2012)
- Astoria (2013)
- In the Light (2014)
- The Worst Is Yet to Come (2019)
- The Best of Both Worlds (2020)

=== Novels ===
- Knock Knock (2011)
- I Wish I Was Like You (2017)
- The Worst Is Yet to Come (2019)

=== Collections ===
- Red Poppies: 7 Tales of Envy & Revenge (2009)
- Strange Is the Night (2017)

=== As editor ===
- Little Visible Delight (2013) with Kate Jonez

=== Short fiction ===
- Fur (1988)
- A.G.A. (2012)
- This Many (2013)
- Strange Is the Night (2015)
- The Second Floor (2015)
- Death and Disbursement (2015)
- Lost and Found (2016)
- Stag in Flight (2016)
- Water Main (2016)
- Muscadines (2016)
- Somnambule (2016)
- Patio Wing Monsters (2017)
- Vigilance. Sacrifice. (2017)
- 140 x 76 (A Tour of Griffith Park) (2017)
- Alligator Point (2017)
- Asking Price (2017)
- We're Never Inviting Amber Again (2017)
- A Condition for Marriage (2017)
- Animal House (2017)
- Ms. X Regrets Everything (2017)
- Pins (2017)
- Legends of Claudia (2018)
