= Only Forward =

1994 science fiction novel by Michael Marshall Smith

- First edition (UK)
- Author: Michael Marshall Smith
- Language: English
- Genre: Science fiction / Horror
- Publisher: HarperCollins (UK edition); Bantam (US edition)
- Publication date: 1994
- Publication place: UK
- Media type: Print (Paperback)
- ISBN: 0-00-651266-6 (UK edition); 0553579703 (US edition)
- OCLC: 60163426

Only Forward is a science fiction novel by English writer Michael Marshall Smith; his debut novel, it was first published in 1994 by HarperCollins. It was the winner of the August Derleth Award (1995) and Philip K. Dick Award (2000).

== Plot ==
The protagonist, Stark, lives in an unidentified large city, referred to only as The City, several centuries in the future. The City comprises a variety of Neighbourhoods that enforce their own rules on residents. Stark's Neighbourhood is Colour, which has an entry requirement of an appreciation of colour, and a central computer that changes the colours of its streets. Other Neighbourhoods include the Action Centre, where yuppie office workers strive continually to advance their own status; Stable, a walled-off, roofed-over Neighbourhood where residents are led to believe that they're the only survivors of a nuclear war centuries earlier; and Cat, an area deserted of humans and inhabited solely by cats, despite which the shops are always well-stocked and streets are always clean and tidy, entered through a set of iron gates which open only for true cat lovers.

Stark, a freelance troubleshooter, accepts a job from a high-ranking member of the Action Centre to locate Alkland, a senior Actioneer who has vanished. Stark intuits that Alkland was kidnapped, and follows intelligence that he may be in Red, a dangerous and gang-controlled Neighbourhood. Stark uses an old friend in Red, Ji, to find out, surviving a gang territory war in the process, that Alkland was taken to Stable. After dangerously infiltrating Stable, escaping an armed attack from unknown individuals, and extracting Alkland, Stark learns that Alkland was actually smuggled into Stable at his own behest.

Alkland gives his reason for departing as having learned that the Action Centre relies on a drug produced in a grossly unethical fashion, and Stark realises that the Action Centre want Alkland to prevent him blowing the whistle. While Alkland sleeps, he experiences a strange seizure that Stark recognises as something from his past, which may only be curable in a very unusual place. Surviving a bomb attack on the apartment by Actioneers, Stark takes Alkland to a Neighbourhood on the coast.

Stark asks an old friend to do him a favour and take a short flight. As that happens, Stark and Alkland walk onto the seafront, where they find that the sea has suddenly vanished and been replaced by a strange landscape. Stark explains that centuries earlier, someone accidentally found a way to make the illusion of the sea looking like land from above to be true. Entering, they find an indistinct region that operates with the surreal logic of dreams, which Stark says is named Jeamland. After navigating a series of nightmarish events, during which they realise that someone or something terrible is pursuing them, Stark and Alkland return to the City, taking refuge in Cat. The nightmare presence finds them and kills Alkland, but Stark and Ji are able to defeat it.

As narrator, Stark reveals that he was the person who had originally discovered the way to enter Jeamland, in 1994, with his friend Rafe. Exploring Jeamland together, they emerged in the City and found themselves unable to return to their own world. After some time living in the City, Stark entered an overgrown and abandoned area of ruined, ancient buildings, and saw a collapsed statue of Admiral Nelson, in that moment realising that he had travelled not to another world, but to the future. Meanwhile, Rafe, disturbed by a nightmare experience in Jeamland, had gone insane. After Rafe accumulated a dangerous power from Jeamland, Stark and Ji were forced to hunt down and kill him. Stark explains that the nightmare presence they had been fighting was a memory of Rafe, kept alive by Jeamland.
