= Sarah Langan =

American horror writer

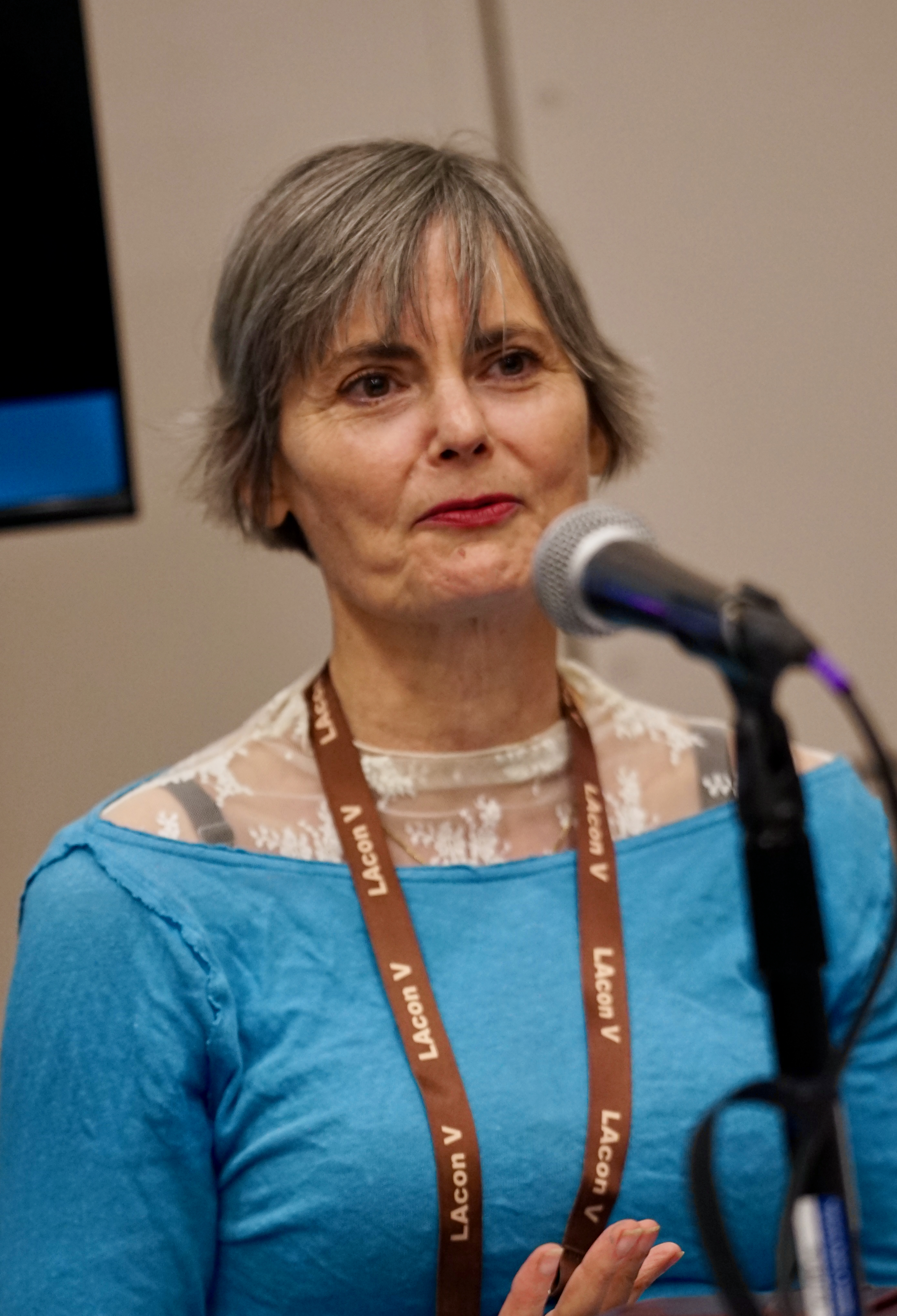
- Langan at Worldcon 2026
- Born: 1974 (age 51–52); United States
- Education: MFA
- Alma mater: Columbia University
- Occupation: Author
- Spouse: J. T. Petty
- Writing career
- Language: English
- Genre: Horror
- Notable works: The Missing; Audrey's Door
- Notable awards: Bram Stoker Award 2007, 2008, 2009
- Website: www.sarahlangan.com

Sarah Langan (born 1974) is an American horror author and three-time Bram Stoker Award winner. Langan was also one of the judges for the inaugural Shirley Jackson Award and is currently on its Board of Directors.

== Biography ==
Langan was raised in Long Island, New York and graduated from Garden City High School in 1992. She attended Colby College in Waterville, Maine and earned her Master of Fine Arts from Columbia University in 2000. She resides in Los Angeles, California with her husband, author and filmmaker J. T. Petty.

== Bibliography ==
=== Novels ===
She has published six novels:

- The Keeper (2006)
- The Missing (2007), (2007 Bram Stoker Award winner)
- Audrey's Door (2009), (2009 Bram Stoker Award winner)
- Good Neighbors (2021)
- A Better World (2024)
- Trad Wife (2026)

=== Short fiction ===
Langan published her first story, "Sick People", while attending college in Maine. Her short story "The Lost" won the Bram Stoker Award in 2008.

Langan's short stories have been published in Cemetery Dance, Phantom, Chiaroscuro, Brave New Worlds, Darkness on the Edge, and Unspeakable Horror.
