= Nancy Holder =

American writer (born 1953)

- Born: Nancy Lindsay Jones; August 29, 1953 (age 73); Los Altos, California, U.S.
- Education: University of California at San Diego (BA)
- Occupations: writer; editor
- Spouse: Wayne Holder
- Writing career
- Pen name: Melissa J. Morgan
- Years active: 1972–present
- Genres: science fiction, horror
- Notable awards: Bram Stoker Award for Best Novel (1994); Bram Stoker Award for Lifetime Achievement (r. 2022)
- Website: nancyholder.com

Nancy Holder (born August 29, 1953) is an American writer and the author of several novels, including numerous tie-in books based on the TV series Buffy the Vampire Slayer. She has also written fiction related to several other science fiction and fantasy shows, including Angel and Smallville.

== Personal life and education ==
Holder was born Nancy Lindsay Jones in Los Altos, California on August 29, 1953. Growing up in California and Japan, Nancy quit school at 16 to be a ballet dancer in Germany. Eventually returning to the U.S., she resumed her studies and graduated from the University of California, San Diego with a Communications degree.

Holder is married to Wayne Holder, with whom she has a daughter, Belle Claire Christine Holder (born October 28, 1996).

== Career ==
Holder is a six-time winner of the Bram Stoker Award for superior achievement in horror writing and received the Bram Stoker Award for Lifetime Achievement in 2021. She won Best Short Story in 1991 for "Lady Madonna", in 1993 for "I Hear the Mermaids Singing", and in 1994 for "Cafe Endless: Spring Rain". She won Best Novel in 1994 for Dead in the Water.

Other books by Nancy Holder (and Debbie Viguié) include the Wicked series, about a family feud between a coven of witches called the Cahors and a coven of warlocks called the Devereux.

Holder contributed to the design of Dungeon Master, developed and sold by her husband Wayne Holder's company FTL Games. She has also begun collaborating with her daughter, Claire Holder, when published short stories.

Holder contributed the original story concept to the 2018 Firefly novel Big Damn Hero by James Lovegrove.

She occasionally teaches courses in writing and on Buffy the Vampire Slayer at the University of California, San Diego.

In 2014, Holder stepped into the position of Vice President of the Horror Writers Association.

== Awards ==
Awards for Holder's writing
Year	Title	Award	Category	Result	Ref.
1991	"Lady Madonna"	Bram Stoker Award	Short Fiction	Won	
1993	"I Hear the Mermaids Singing"	Bram Stoker Award	Short Fiction	Won	
1994	"Cafe Endless: Spring Rain"	Bram Stoker Award	Short Fiction	Won	
1994	Dead in the Water	Bram Stoker Award	Novel	Won	
1994	Making Love	Locus Award	Horror Novel	Nominated–9th	
1995	Dead in the Water	Locus Award	Dark Fantasy/Horror Novel	Nominated–15th	
1999	The Angel Chronicles: A Novelization	Bram Stoker Award	Work for Young Readers	Finalist	
2000	Buffy the Vampire Slayer: Immortal	Listen Up Award	Popular Culture	Selected	
2005	Outsiders	Bram Stoker Award	Anthology	Finalist	
2011	The Screaming Season	Bram Stoker Award	Young Adult Novel	Won	
2011	Tough Love	Scribe Awards	Original Novel (General)	Won	
2016	Crimson Peak	Scribe Awards	Adapted Novel	Finalist	
2019	—	Faust Award	—	Won	
2019	Firefly: Big Damn Hero	Dragon Awards	Media Tie-In Novel	Finalist	
2020	Mary Shelley Presents	Bram Stoker Award	Graphic Novel	Won	
2021	—	Bram Stoker Award	Lifetime Achievement	Won	

== Bibliography ==
=== Novels ===
- Jessie's Song (1983) (writing as Nancy L. Jones)
- Winner Take All (1984)
- The Greatest Show on Earth (1984)
- Finders Keepers (1985)
- His Fair Lady (1985)
- Out of This World (1985)
- Once in Love with Amy (1986)
- Emerald Fire (1986)
- Rough Cut (1990)
- The Ghosts of Tivoli (1992)
- Cannibal Dwight's Special Purpose (1992)
- Making Love (1993) (with Melanie Tem)
- Dead in the Water (1994 Dell Publishing) – ISBN 0-440-21481-5
- Witch-Light (1996) (with Melanie Tem)
- Pearl Harbor, 1941 (2000)
- Smallville: Hauntings (2003)
- Spirited (2004)
- Pretty Little Devils (2006)
- Daughter of the Flames (2006)
- Daughter of the Blood (2006)
- The Rose Bride (2007)
- On Fire, a Teen Wolf Novel (2012)
- Crimson Peak (2015)
- Ghostbusters (2016 Tor Books) – ISBN 0-765-38843-X
- Wonder Woman (2017 Titan Books) – ISBN 978-1-7856-5378-0

=== Collections ===
- Wings and Other Poems (1972)

=== Series ===
==== Gambler's Star ====
- The Six Families (1998)
- Legacies and Lies (1999)
- Invasions (2000)

==== Wicked ====
- Witch (2002) (with Debbie Viguié)
- Curse (2002) (with Debbie Viguié)
- Legacy (2003) (with Debbie Viguié)
- Spellbound (2003) (with Debbie Viguié)
- Resurrection (2009) (with Debbie Viguié)

==== RSVP ====
- Camp Confidential (2005) (as Melissa J. Morgan)

==== Possessions ====
- Possessions (2009)
- The Evil Within (2010)
- The Screaming Season (Mar 2011)

==== Crusade ====
- Crusade (2010) (with Debbie Viguié)
- Damned (2011) (with Debbie Viguié)
- Vanquished (2012) (with Debbie Viguié)

==== Wolf Springs Chronicles ====
- Unleashed (2011) (with Debbie Viguié)
- Hot Blooded (July 9, 2012) (with Debbie Viguié)
- Savage (2013) (with Debbie Viguié)

=== Buffyverse works ===
==== Novels ====
- 1997: Halloween Rain (with Christopher Golden)
- 1998: Blooded (with Christopher Golden)
- 1998: Child of the Hunt (with Christopher Golden)
- 1998: The Angel Chronicles, Vol. 1
- 1999: The Gatekeeper (with Christopher Golden)
- 1999: Immortal (with Christopher Golden)
- 1999: The Angel Chronicles, Vol. 3
- 1999: The Sunnydale High Yearbook
- 2000: The Evil That Men Do
- 2000: Not Forgotten
- 2000: Unseen (with Jeff Mariotte)
- 2001: The Book of Fours
- 2002: The Journals of Rupert Giles, Vol. 1
- 2002: Endangered Species
- 2003: Blood and Fog
- 2004: Heat
- 2005: Keep Me in Mind
- 2005: Queen of the Slayers
- 2006: Carnival of Souls

==== Short stories ====
She has also written short stories in:

- How I Survived My Summer Vacation (2000)
- Tales of the Slayer (2001)
- The Anchoress (2002)

=== Other short works ===
- Tales of Zorro
- The Eternal Kiss: 13 Vampire Tales of Blood and Desire (with Debbie Viguié)
- Furry Fantastic (with Belle Holder)
- Pandora's Closet (with Belle Holder)

=== Anthologies ===
Anthology or Collection	Contents	Publication Date
The Mammoth Book of Vampire Romance	Vampire Unchained	2008
An Apple for a Creature	VSI	Aug 2012

=== Non-fiction ===
- Angel: the Casefiles, Volume 1 (with Jeff Mariotte and Maryelizabeth Hart) (1999)
- Buffy the Vampire Slayer Encyclopedia: The Ultimate Guide to the Buffyverse (2017)

=== Comics ===
Beginning in 2009 she has contributed a number of stories for the Domino Lady comics published by Moonstone Books.

== See also ==
- Buffyverse chronology
- List of Buffy the Vampire Slayer books – these tend to surround the character of Buffy and the fictional town of Sunnydale
- List of Angel books – these instead focus on Angel and his so-called "Fang Gang"
- Tales of the Slayer – these chronicle the stories of past slayers in the Buffy canon
