= And Now in Colour =

BBC Radio 4 comedy programme

And Now in Colour is a radio comedy programme that aired on BBC Radio 4 for two series (each consisting of six half-hour episodes) and two half-hour Christmas specials between March 1990 and December 1991. It starred Tim Firth, Tim de Jongh, Michael Rutger and William Vandyck and has since been repeated on BBC Radio 4 Extra, most recently in 2025.
