= Jeff Strand =

American writer (born 1970)

- Born: December 14, 1970 (age 55); Baltimore, Maryland, U.S.
- Occupation: Writer
- Partner: Bridgett Nelson
- Writing career
- Years active: 1996–present
- Genres: Horror comedy, thriller, young adult fiction
- Notable awards: Bram Stoker Award for Best Long Fiction (2022)
- Website: www.jeffstrand.com

Jeff Strand (born December 14, 1970) is an American writer, known for his works of comedy horror.

He has written novels, short stories, screenplays, and comedy sketches. In addition to his adult-oriented horror works, Strand also writes young adult fiction. He has been nominated for the Bram Stoker Award five times, winning the award for the first time in the Best Long Fiction category for his novella Twentieth Anniversary Screening (2022).

== Biography ==
Strand was born in Baltimore, Maryland, and moved to Fairbanks, Alaska, at six months of age. Prior to his freshman year of high school, he moved to Kent, Ohio, and attended Theodore Roosevelt High School, graduating in 1989. He went on to Bowling Green State University in Bowling Green, Ohio, where he majored in creative writing. After graduating college, he briefly returned to Alaska before moving back to Ohio. His next move was to Tucson, Arizona. Strand moved to Tampa, Florida in 1996, and worked for MetLife as a Remittance Service Analyst for almost twenty years before quitting his day job to write full-time in 2015. He lived briefly in Atlanta, Georgia, and Chattanooga, Tennessee, before moving to Duluth, Minnesota.

He had his first short story sale in 1996, selling "The Private Diary of Leonard Parr" to Twisted Magazine, where it was featured in the first and only issue.

In 2000, Strand published Graverobbers Wanted (No Experience Necessary), through Hard Shell Word Factory. It was the first novel in the horror-comedy style for which he would later become known.

In 2006, his novel Pressure was the first of his books to be nominated for a Bram Stoker Award, in the Best Novel category. In 2018, his novelette "The Tipping Point" from his short story collection Everything Has Teeth won a Splatterpunk Award in the Best Short Story category. In 2022, "Next Best Baker," included in Baker's Dozen from Uncomfortably Dark, won a Splatterpunk Award in the Best Short Story Category.

He emceed the Bram Stoker Awards ten times. Dweller (2010) was nominated for the Bram Stoker Award for Best Novel in 2010.

As a screenwriter, Strand is an active member of the Writers Guild of America (WGA).

== Style ==
Strand is primarily known for his works of horror-comedy, which has earned him the nickname "The Clown Prince of Horror", but he also writes thrillers and young adult fiction. His writing is often defined by its dark humor and sparse prose style. Strand has named authors Douglas Adams, Richard Laymon, Dave Barry, and Jack Ketchum as influencing his writing.

== Personal life ==
Strand currently lives in Duluth, Minnesota, with his girlfriend, horror author Bridgett Nelson.

== Bibliography ==
=== Novels ===
- How to Rescue a Dead Princess (2000)
- Graverobbers Wanted (No Experience Necessary) (2000)
- Elrod McBugle on the Loose (2000)
- Single White Psychopath Seeks Same (2001)
- Out of Whack (2001)
- Mandibles (2002)
- Casket for Sale (Only Used Once) (2004)
- Pressure (2006)
- The Haunted Forest Tour (2007) (with James A. Moore)
- The Sinister Mr. Corpse (2007)
- Benjamin’s Parasite (2009)
- Dweller (2010)
- Draculas (2010) (with JA Konrath, Blake Crouch, and F. Paul Wilson)
- Fangboy (2011)
- Lost Homicidal Maniac (Answers to “Shirley”) (2011)
- Wolf Hunt (2011)
- A Bad Day for Voodoo (2012)
- I Have A Bad Feeling About This (2014)
- Kumquat (2014)
- Wolf Hunt 2 (2014)
- Blister (2016)
- Cyclops Road (2016)
- The Greatest Zombie Movie Ever (2016)
- Stranger Things Have Happened (2017)
- Bang Up (2018)
- Bring Her Back (2018)
- How You Ruined My Life (2018)
- Sick House (2018)
- Clowns vs. Spiders (2019)
- Ferocious (2019)
- My Pretties (2019)
- Wolf Hunt 3 (2019)
- Allison (2020)
- Autumn Bleeds into Winter (2020)
- Cemetery Closing (Everything Must Go) (2020)
- The Odds (2020)
- Deathless (2021)
- Attack of the Killer Tomatoes: The Novelization (2023)
- Demonic (2023)
- Veiled (2023)
- Creep Out (2024)
- It Watches in the Dark (2024)
- Nightmare in the Backyard (2024)
- Bloodsucker County (2025)
- Finders Keepers (2025)
- Your Body Will Never Be Found (2025)
- Terror From The Cave (2026)
- Fun Times at the Bloodbath (2026)

=== Novellas ===
- Disposal (2007)
- Suckers (2009) (with JA Konrath)
- Kutter (2010)
- The Faint of Heart (2012)
- Stalking You Now (2013)
- Facial (2014)
- An Apocalypse of Our Own (2017)
- Cold Dead Hands (2018)
- Twentieth Anniversary Screening (2021)

=== Collections ===
- Gleefully Macabre Tales (2008)
- Dead Clown Barbecue (2012)
- Dead Clown Barbecue: Expansion Pack (2014)
- Everything Has Teeth (2017)
- Five Novellas (2019)
- Candy Coated Madness (2020)
- Freaky Briefs (2022)
- Snuggling the Grotesque (2024)

=== Non-Fiction ===
- The Writing Life: Reflections, Recollections, and a Lot of Cursing (2020)

=== Chapbooks ===
- Socially Awkward Moments With An Aspiring Lunatic (2005)
- Two Twisted Nuts: A Chapbook of Testicular Terror (2005) (with Nick Cato)
- Funny Stories of Scary Sex (2006)
- The Severed Nose (2009)
- Bad Bratwurst (2015)
