= Dead in the Water (Holder novel) =

1994 novel by Nancy Holder

Dead in the Water is a novel by Nancy Holder, published by Abyss/Dell in 1994.

== Plot summary ==
Dead in the Water is a horror novel which involves several characters (a boy sick with cancer and his doctor father, a wealthy squabbling couple, an older woman whose husband was lost at sea, and a female police officer who once failed to rescue a drowning boy) aboard a dilapidated old freighter.

== Reception ==
Cliff Ramshaw reviewed Dead in the Water for Arcane magazine, rating it a 6 out of 10 overall. Ramshaw comments that "Jarring, and not particularly evocative. Things start slowly, not least because the only character drawn with any conviction is the lady cop - one significant item of person history is about as much as the other characters get. Gradually, though, the plot and the fog thicken, and a brooding sense of nastiness evolves as our heroes desperately ignore the increasingly strange going on around them."

== Reviews ==
- Review by Scott Winnett (1994) in Locus, #403 August 1994
- Review by Graham Andrews (1996) in Vector 187
- Kliatt
