= Michael Marshall Smith =

British writer and screenwriter (born 1965)

- Born: Michael Paul Marshall Smith; 3 May 1965 (age 61); Knutsford, Cheshire, England
- Other names: M. M. Smith; Michael Rutger
- Education: King's College, Cambridge
- Occupation: Author
- Writing career
- Pen name: Michael Marshall
- Website: www.michaelmarshallsmith.com

Michael Paul Marshall Smith (born 3 May 1965) is an English novelist, screenwriter and short story writer who also writes as Michael Marshall, M. M. Smith and Michael Rutger.

== Biography ==
Born in Knutsford, Cheshire, Smith moved with his family at an early age to first Illinois and then Florida. When he was seven, the family moved again, this time to South Africa, and then to Australia before eventually returning home to England in 1973.

He was educated at Chigwell School and at King's College, Cambridge, where he studied Philosophy, Social and Political Science, and became involved with the Cambridge Footlights. Under the pseudonym of Michael Rutger, he became a comedy writer and performer on the BBC Radio 4 series And Now in Colour, which ran for two series. Between 2002 and 2004, he also co-wrote material for two series of surreal comedy Dare to Believe.

== Writing career ==
Smith's first published story was "The Man Who Drew Cats", which won the British Fantasy Award in 1991 for "Best Short Story". He has been published in Postscripts. His first novel, Only Forward, was published in 1994 and won the August Derleth Award for Best Novel in 1995, and then the Philip K. Dick Award in 2000. The plot involves the lead character, Stark, having to find a missing man he believes to have been kidnapped, and travel through the strange zones of his city. In 1996, his second novel, Spares, was released, a novel in which the lead character, Jack, goes on the run with clones who are used for spare body parts for rich people, when he realises they are people with feelings. Steven Spielberg's DreamWorks purchased the film rights for Spares, but a film was never made. When the rights lapsed, DreamWorks did produce The Island, whose plot had strong similarities to Spares, though Smith did not consider it worthwhile to pursue legal action over the similarities. He now considers it unlikely a Spares film will ever be made.

The novel The Straw Men was the first to be written under the shortened name "Michael Marshall". This change of name was originally due to the publishing of another book of the same name in 2001 by Martin J. Smith. However, Marshall Smith then decided to use the split to offer the possibility of publishing different genres of books under the two names – "modern day" novels as Michael Marshall, and horror/science fiction as Michael Marshall Smith.

In 2012, he set up Ememess Press, a virtual small press specialising in producing electronic versions of the short fiction written under the name Michael Marshall Smith.

Intruders, a television series on BBC America, is based on Smith's 2007 novel The Intruders.

== Bibliography ==
=== Novels ===
- Only Forward (1994, HarperCollins) – ISBN 978-0586217740
- Spares (1996, HarperCollins) – ISBN 978-0002246569
- One of Us (1998, HarperCollins) – ISBN 978-0002256001
- Hannah Green and her Unfeasibly Mundane Existence (2017) – ISBN 978-0008237912

As M. M. Smith:

- The Servants (2007, HarperCollins) – ISBN 978-0979505409

As Michael Marshall:

- The Straw Men (2001, HarperCollins) – ISBN 978-0007163960
- The Lonely Dead (2004):
  - Published in the UK by HarperCollins – ISBN 978-0007163946
  - Released in the US under the title The Upright Man – ISBN 978-0515136388
- Blood of Angels (2005, HarperCollins) – ISBN 978-0007163960
- The Intruders (2007, HarperCollins) – ISBN 978-0007209972, 978-0061235023
- Bad Things (2009) – ISBN 978-0061434402, 978-0007209989
- Killer Move (2011) – ISBN 978-1409133247
- We Are Here (2013) – ISBN 978-0316252577, 978-1409136026

The Anomaly Series, as Michael Rutger:

1. The Anomaly (2018) – ISBN 978-1538761854
2. The Possession (2019) – ISBN 978-1785767678

=== Novellas ===
- The Vaccinator (1999)

=== Collections ===
- When God Lived in Kentish Town (1998) – a small paperback containing four stories, distributed for free by WHSmith at tube and rail stations around London and in Heathrow airport to promote the publication of One of Us. 5,000 copies were produced.
- What You Make It (1999)
- Cat Stories (2001)
- More Tomorrow & Other Stories (2003)
- This Is Now (2007)
- Everything You Need (2013)
- The Best of Michael Marshall Smith (2020)

== Awards ==
Year	Society	Award	Category	Nominee	Result
1991	British Fantasy Society	BFA	Best Newcomer		Won
1991	British Fantasy Society	BFA	Short Fiction	"The Man Who Drew Cats"	Won
1992	British Fantasy Society	BFA	Short Fiction	"The Dark Land"	Won
1995	British Fantasy Society	BFA	Best Novel – August Derleth Award	Only Forward	Won
1996	British Fantasy Society	BFA	Short Fiction	"More Tomorrow"	Won
2000	Philadelphia Science Fiction Society	Philip K. Dick Award		Only Forward	Won
2010	British Fantasy Society	BFA	Short Fiction	"What Happens When You Wake Up In The Night"	Won
