= Bram Stoker Award for Best Long Fiction =

Literary award

The Bram Stoker Award for Best Long Fiction is an award presented by the Horror Writers Association (HWA) for "superior achievement" in horror writing for long fiction.

== Winners and nominees ==
Nominees are listed below the winner(s) for each year.

Bram Stoker Award for Best Long Fiction winners and finalists
Year	Author	Title	Result	Ref.
1987	George R. R. Martin	The Pear-Shaped Man	Winner	
1987	Alan Rodgers	The Boy Who Came Back From The Dead	Winner	
1987	David J. Schow	Pamela's Get	Finalist	
1987	S. P. Somtow	Resurrec Tech	Finalist	
1988	David Morrell	Orange is for Anguish, Blue for Insanity	Winner	
1988	Harlan Ellison	The Function of Dream Sleep	Finalist	
1988	John Farris	Horrorshow	Finalist	
1988	Stephen King	The Night Flier	Finalist	
1988	George R. R. Martin	The Skin Trade	Finalist	
1988	Peter Straub	The Juniper Tree	Finalist	
1989	Joe R. Lansdale	On the Far Side of the Cadillac Desert With Dead Folks	Winner	
1989	Kristine Kathryn Rusch	Phantom	Finalist	
1989	Karl Edward Wagner	At First Just Ghostly	Finalist	
1989	Chet Williamson	The Confessions of St. James	Finalist	
1990	Elizabeth Massie	Stephen	Winner	
1990	Michael Blumleim	Bestseller	Finalist	
1990	Stephen King	The Langoliers	Finalist	
1990	Dan Simmons	Entropy's Bed at Midnight	Finalist	
1990	F. Paul Wilson	Pelts	Finalist	
1991	David Morrell	The Beautiful Uncut Hair of Graves	Winner	
1991	Edward Bryant	Fetish	Finalist	
1991	Suzy McKee Charnas and Chelsea Quinn Yarbro	Advocates	Finalist	
1991	Stephen Gallagher	Magpie	Finalist	
1991	Charles de Lint	Death Leaves an Echo	Finalist	
1992	Stephen Bissette	Alien: Tribes	Winner	
1992	Joe R. Lansdale	The Events Concerning a Nude Fold-Out Found in a Harlequin Romance	Winner	
1992	David Morrell	Nothing Will Hurt You	Finalist	
1992	David Morrell	The Shrine	Finalist	
1992	Wayne Allen Sallee	For You, the Living	Finalist	
1993 (Novelette) (Note: In 1993, the category was split into "best novella" and "best novelette", a distinction that was eliminated a year later.)	Dan Simmons	Death in Bangkok	Winner	
1993 (Novelette)	Michael Moorcock	Colour	Finalist	
1993 (Novelette)	S. P. Somtow	Darker Angels	Finalist	
1993 (Novelette)	Connie Willis	Death on the Nile	Finalist	
1993 (Novella)	Jack Cady	The Night We Buried Road Dog	Winner	
1993 (Novella)	Harlan Ellison	Mefisto in Onyx	Winner	
1993 (Novella)	Dan Simmons	Flashback	Finalist	
1993 (Novella)	Richard Gilliam	Caroline and Caleb	Finalist	
1994	Robert Bloch	The Scent of Vinegar	Winner	
1994	Charles L. Grant	Sometimes, in the Rain	Finalist	
1994	Brian Hodge	The Alchemy of the Throat	Finalist	
1994	Joe R. Lansdale	Bubba Ho-tep	Finalist	
1994	William R. Trotter	The Siren of Swan Quarter	Finalist	
1995	Stephen King	Lunch at the Gotham Cafe	Winner	
1995	Adam-Troy Castro	Baby Girl Diamond	Finalist	
1995	Thomas F. Monteleone	Looking for Mr. Flip	Finalist	
1995	Wayne Allen Sallee	Lover Doll	Finalist	
1996	Thomas Ligotti	The Red Tower	Winner	
1996	Jack Cady	Kilroy Was Here	Finalist	
1996	Nancy Collins	The Thing from Lover's Lane	Finalist	
1996	S. P. Somtow	Brimstone and Salt	Finalist	
1997	Joe R. Lansdale	The Big Blow	Winner	
1997	Ramsey Campbell	The Word	Finalist	
1997	Stephen King	Everything's Eventual	Finalist	
1997	Kim Newman	Coppola's Dracula	Finalist	
1997	Douglas E. Winter	The Zombies of Madison County	Finalist	
1998	Peter Straub	Mr. Clubb and Mr. Cuff	Winner	
1998	P. D. Cacek	Leavings	Finalist	
1998	Brian Hodge	As Above, So Below	Finalist	
1998	John Shirley	What Would You Do For Love?	Finalist	
1999	Brian A. Hopkins	Five Days in April	Winner	
1999	Joe R. Lansdale	Mad Dog Summer	Winner	
1999	Charlee Jacob	Dread in the Beast	Finalist	
1999	Jack Ketchum	Right to Life	Finalist	
2000	Melanie Tem and Steve Rasnic Tem	The Man on the Ceiling	Winner	
2000	Stephen King	Riding the Bullet	Finalist	
2000	Joyce Carol Oates	In Shock	Finalist	
2000	Lawrence P. Santoto	God Screamed and Screamed, Then I Ate Him	Finalist	
2001	Steve Rasnic Tem	In These Final Days of Sales	Winner	
2001	Harlan Ellison	From A to Z, in the Sarsaparilla Alphabet	Finalist	
2001	Nancy Etchemendy	Demolition	Finalist	
2001	Brian Keene	Earthworm Gods	Finalist	
2001	Nick Mamatas	Northern Gothic	Finalist	
2002	Brian A. Hopkins	El Dia de Los Muertos	Winner	
2002	Thomas Ligotti	My Work is Not Yet Done	Winner	
2002	Paul Finch	Cape Wrath	Finalist	
2002	Neil Gaiman	Coraline	Finalist	
2002	David B. Silva	The Origin	Finalist	
2003	Jack Ketchum	Closing Time	Winner	
2003	Douglas Clegg	The Necromancer	Finalist	
2003	Tom Piccirilli	Fuckin' Lie Down Already	Finalist	
2003	Lucius Shepard	Louisiana Breakdown	Finalist	
2003	David Niall Wilson	Roll Them Bones	Finalist	
2004	Kealan Patrick Burke	The Turtle Boy	Winner	
2004	Andy Duncan	Zora and the Zombie	Finalist	
2004	Stephen King	Lisey and the Madman	Finalist	
2004	Tim Lebbon	Dead Man's Hand	Finalist	
2004	Barbara Roden	Northwest Passage	Finalist	
2005	Joe Hill	Best New Horror	Winner	
2005	Gary A. Braunbeck	In the Midnight Museum	Finalist	
2005	Stephen King	The Things They Left Behind	Finalist	
2005	Kelly Link	Some Zombie Contingency Plans	Finalist	
2006	Norman Partridge	Dark Harvest	Winner	
2006	Laird Barron	Hallucigenia	Finalist	
2006	Fran Friel	Mama's Boy	Finalist	
2006	Christopher Golden and James A. Moore	Bloodstained Oz	Finalist	
2006	Kim Newman	Clubland Heroes	Finalist	
2007	Gary Braunbeck	Afterward, There Will Be A Hallway	Winner	
2007	Scott Edelman	Almost the Last Story by Almost the Last Man	Finalist	
2007	Nicholas Kaufmann	General Slocum's Gold	Finalist	
2007	William Browning Spencer	The Tenth Muse	Finalist	
2007	Lee Thomas	An Apiary of White Bees	Finalist	
2008	John R. Little	Miranda	Winner	
2008	Adam-Troy Castro	The Shallow End of the Pool	Finalist	
2008	Gene O'Neill	The Confessions of St. Zach	Finalist	
2008	Weston Ochse	Redemption Roadshow	Finalist	
2009	Lisa Morton	The Lucid Dreaming	Winner	
2009	Mort Castle	Dreaming Robot Monster	Finalist	
2009	Scott Edelman	The Hunger of Empty Vessels	Finalist	
2009	Gene O'Neill	Doc Good's Traveling Show	Finalist	
2010	Norman Prentiss	Invisible Fences	Winner	
2010	Brian James Freeman	The Painted Darkness	Finalist	
2010	Lisa Mannetti	Dissolution	Finalist	
2010	Kirstyn McDermott	Monsters Among Us	Finalist	
2010	Lisa Morton	The Samhanach	Finalist	
2011	Peter Straub	The Ballad of Ballard and Sandrine	Winner	
2011	Michael Louis Calvillo	7 Brains	Finalist	
2011	Brian Hodge	Roots and All	Finalist	
2011	Caitlin R. Kiernan	The Colliers' Venus (1893)	Finalist	
2011	John R. Little	Ursa Major	Finalist	
2011	Gene O'Neill	Rusting Chickens	Finalist	
2012	Gene O'Neill	The Blue Heron	Winner	
2012	Kealan Patrick Burke	Thirty Miles South of Dry County	Finalist	
2012	Jack Ketchum and Lucky McKee	I'm Not Sam	Finalist	
2012	Joe McKinney and Michael McCarty	Lost Girl of the Lake	Finalist	
2012	Norman Prentiss	The Fleshless Man	Finalist	
2013	Gary Braunbeck	The Great Pity	Winner	
2013	Dale Bailey	The Bluehole	Finalist	
2013	Benjamin K. Ethridge	The Slaughter Man	Finalist	
2013	Gregory Frost	No Others Are Genuine	Finalist	
2013	Greg F. Gifune	House of Rain	Finalist	
2013	Rena Mason	East End Girls	Finalist	
2014	Joe R. Lansdale	Fishing for Dinosaurs	Winner	
2014	Taylor Grant	The Infected	Finalist	
2014	Eric J. Guignard	Dreams of a Little Suicide	Finalist	
2014	Jonathan Maberry	Three Guys Walk into a Bar	Finalist	
2014	Joe McKinney	Lost and Found	Finalist	
2015	Mercedes M. Yardley	Little Dead Red	Winner	
2015	Gary A. Braunbeck	Paper Cuts	Finalist	
2015	Scott Edelman	Becoming Invisible, Becoming Seen	Finalist	
2015	Lisa Mannetti	The Box Jumper	Finalist	
2015	Norman Partridge	Special Collections	Finalist	
2016	Tim Waggoner	The Winter Box	Winner	
2016	Nicole Cushing	The Sadist's Bible	Finalist	
2016	Scott Edelman	That Perilous Stuff	Finalist	
2016	Victor LaValle	The Ballad of Black Tom	Finalist	
2016	Josh Malerman	The Jupiter Drop	Finalist	
2017	Stephen Graham Jones	Mapping the Interior	Winner	
2017	Scott Edelman	Faking it Until Forever Comes	Finalist	
2017	Caitlin R. Kiernan	Agents of Dreamland	Finalist	
2017	Lucy Taylor	Sweetlings	Finalist	
2017	Tim Waggoner	A Kiss of Thorns	Finalist	
2018	Rena Mason	The Devil's Throat	Winner	
2018	Michael Bailey	Our Children, Our Teachers	Finalist	
2018	Joe Hill	You Are Released	Finalist	
2018	Usman T. Malik	Dead Lovers on Each Blade, Hung	Finalist	
2018	Angela Yuriko Smith	Bitter Suites	Finalist	
2019	Victor LaValle	Up from Slavery	Winner	
2019	Alessandro Manzetti	The Keeper of Chernobyl	Finalist	
2019	Anna Taborska	The Cat Sitter	Finalist	
2019	Sara Tantlinger	To Be Devoured	Finalist	
2019	Kaaron Warren	Into Bones Like Oil	Finalist	
2020	Stephen Graham Jones	Night of the Mannequins	Winner	
2020	Gabino Iglesias	Beyond the Reef	Finalist	
2020	Gwendolyn Kiste	The Invention of Ghosts	Finalist	
2020	Jess Landry	I Will Find You, Even in the Dark	Finalist	
2020	Sarah Pinsker	Two Truths and a Lie	Finalist	
2021	Jeff Strand	Twentieth Anniversary Screening	Winner	
2021	V. Castro	Goddess of Filth	Finalist	
2021	Cassandra Khaw	Nothing But Blackened Teeth	Finalist	
2021	Eric LaRocca	Things Have Gotten Worse Since We Last Spoke	Finalist	
2021	Hailey Piper	Recitation of the First Feeding	Finalist	
2022	Alma Katsu	The Wehrwolf	Winner	
2022	Rebecca J. Allred and Gordon B. White	And in Her Smile, the World	Finalist	
2022	Christa Carmen	Through the Looking Glass and Straight into Hell	Finalist	
2022	Laurel Hightower	Below	Finalist	
2022	EV Knight	Three Days in the Pink Tower	Finalist	
2023	Ai Jiang	Linghun	Winner	
2023	Tananarive Due	Rumpus Room	Finalist	
2023	Cassandra Khaw	The Salt Grows Heavy	Finalist	
2023	J.A.W. McCarthy	Sleep Alone	Finalist	
2023	Lee Murray	Despatches	Finalist	
2024
2024	Sofia Ajram	Coup de Grâce	Winner	
2024	Nat Cassidy	Rest Stop	Nominee	
2024	Clay McLeod Chapman	Kill Your Darling	Nominee	
2024	Eric LaRocca	All The Parts of You That Won’t Easily Burn	Nominee	
2024	Eden Royce	Hollow Tongue	Nominee	
2025	Nathan Ballingrud	Cathedral of the Drowned	Co-Winners	
2025	A.C. Wise	“Wolf Moon, Antler Moon”	Co-Winners	
2025	Sarah Langan	Squid Teeth	Finalist	
2025	Sarah Langan	Pam Kowolski is a Monster!	Finalist	
2025	Thomas Ha	Uncertain Sons	Finalist	
