= Bram Stoker Award for Short Fiction =

Literary award

- Awarded for: Superior achievement in horror writing for short fiction
- Presented by: Horror Writers Association
- Eligibility: Published in English
- Formerly called: Best short story
- First award: 1987
- Most recent winner: “Inheritance” - RJ Joseph (2025)

Highlights
- Most awards: Nancy Holder (3)
- Most nominations: Gary A. Braunbeck, Mort Castle, Lisa Mannetti, John Palisano, Steve Rasnic Tem (4)
- Website: www.thebramstokerawards.com
- Related: Bram Stoker Award

The Bram Stoker Award for Short Fiction is an award presented by the Horror Writers Association (HWA) for "superior achievement" in horror writing for short fiction.

== Winners and nominees ==
This category was previously titled "best short story". Nominees are listed below the winner(s) for each year.

=== Short story ===
Year	Recipient	Title	Result	Citation
1987	Robert R. McCammon	"The Deep End"	Winner	
1987	Jonathan Carroll	"Friend's Best Man"	Nominee	
1987	Charles L. Grant	"This Old Man"	Nominee	
1987	F. Paul Wilson	"Day-Tay-Vao"	Nominee	
1987	F. Paul Wilson	"Traps"	Nominee	
1988	Joe R. Lansdale	"Night They Missed the Horror Show"	Winner	
1988	Ray Bradbury	"The Thing at the Top of the Stairs"	Nominee	
1988	Harlan Ellison	"She's a Young Thing and Cannot Leave Her Mother"	Nominee	
1988	Carol Orlock	"Nobody Lives There Now"	Nominee	
1988	Lucius Shepard	"Jack's Decline"	Nominee	
1988	Chet Williamson	"The Music of the Dark Time"	Nominee	
1989	Robert R. McCammon	"Eat Me"	Winner	
1989	Edward Bryant	"A Sad Last Love at the Diner of the Damned"	Nominee	
1989	Kathryn Ptacek	"Each Night, Each Year"	Nominee	
1989	Steve Rasnic Tem	"Bodies and Heads"	Nominee	
1989	Chet Williamson	"'Yore Skin's Jes's Soft 'n Purdy' He Said"	Nominee	
1990	David B. Silva	"The Calling"	Winner	
1990	Edward Bryant	"The Loneliest Number"	Nominee	
1990	Steve Rasnic Tem	"Back Windows"	Nominee	
1990	Karl Edward Wagner	"But You'll Never Follow Me"	Nominee	
1990	Chet Williamson	"From the Papers of Helmut Hecher"	Nominee	
1991	Nancy Holder	"Lady Madonna"	Winner	
1991	Poppy Z. Brite	"The Ash of Memory, the Dust of Desire"	Nominee	
1991	Joe R. Lansdale	"Love Doll: A Fable"	Nominee	
1991	Grant Morrison	"The Braille Encyclopaedia"	Nominee	
1991	Maxine O'Callaghan	"Wolf Winter"	Nominee	
1991	Al Sarrantonio	"Richard's Head"	Nominee	
1992	Dan Simmons	"This Year's Class Picture"	Winner	
1992	Nancy Kilpatrick	"Farm Wife"	Nominee	
1992	Karl Edward Wagner	"Did They Get You to Trade?"	Nominee	
1992	Gahan Wilson	"Come One, Come All"	Nominee	
1992	Douglas E. Winter	"Bright Lights, Big Zombie"	Nominee	
1993	Nancy Holder	"I Hear the Mermaids Singing"	Winner	
1993	Sherman Alexie	"Distances"	Nominee	
1993	William S. Burroughs	"Death Fiend Guerrillas"	Nominee	
1993	Dennis Etchison	"The Dog Park"	Nominee	
1993	Wayne Allen Sallee	"Pain Grin"	Nominee	
1994	Nancy Holder	"Cafe Endless: Spring Rain"	Co-Winner	
1994	Jack Ketchum	"The Box"	Co-Winner	
1994	Edward Lee	"Mr. Torso"	Nominee	
1994	Lucy Taylor	"Things of Which We Do Not Speak"	Nominee	
1995	Harlan Ellison	"Chatting With Anubis"	Winner	
1995	Harry Crews	"Becky Lives"	Nominee	
1995	Thomas Ligotti	"The Bungalow House"	Nominee	
1995	William Browning Spencer	"The Death of the Novel"	Nominee	
1996	P. D. Cacek	"metalica"	Winner	
1996	Robert Devereaux	"The Slobbering Tongue That Ate the Frightfully Huge Woman"	Nominee	
1996	Graham Masterton	"The Secret Shih Tan"	Nominee	
1996	Brian Stableford	"The House of Mourning"	Nominee	
1996	Karl Edward Wagner	"Plan 10 from Inner Space"	Nominee	
1997	Edo van Belkom and David Nickle	"Rat Food"	Winner	
1997	Douglas Clegg	"I Am Infinite, I Contain Multit	Nominee	
1997	Scott Edelman	"A Plague on Both Your Houses"	Nominee	
1997	Brian Hodge	"Madame Babylon"	Nominee	

=== Short fiction ===
Year	Recipient	Title	Result	Citation
1998	Bruce Holland Rogers	"The Dead Boy at Your Window"	Winner	
1998	Edo van Belkom	"The Rug"	Nominee	
1998	Tina L. Jens	"Blues-Born"	Nominee	
1998	Stephen King	"Autopsy Room Four"	Nominee	
1999	F. Paul Wilson	"Aftershock"	Winner	
1999	P. D. Cacek	"The Grave"	Nominee	
1999	Ramsey Campbell	"The Entertainment"	Nominee	
1999	Steve Rasnic Tem	"Halloween Street"	Nominee	
2000	Jack Ketchum	"Gone"	Winner	
2000	Gerard Daniel Houarner	"Dead Cat Bounce"	Nominee	
2000	Robert J. Sawyer	"Fallen Angel"	Nominee	
2000	Karen E. Taylor	"Mexican Moon"	Nominee	
2001	Tim Lebbon	"Reconstructing Amy"	Winner	
2001	Mort Castle	"I Am Your Need"	Nominee	
2001	Jack Ketchum	"The Haunt"	Nominee	
2001	David B. Silva	"Whose Puppets, Best and Worst, Are We?"	Nominee	
2002	Tom Piccirilli	"The Misfit Child Grows Fat on Despair"	Winner	
2002	Mort Castle	"Disappearances"	Nominee	
2002	Christopher Fowler	"The Green Man"	Nominee	
2002	Charlee Jacob	"The Plague Species"	Nominee	
2002	China Miéville	"Details"	Nominee	
2003	Gary A. Braunbeck	"Duty"	Winner	
2003	Scott Edelman	"The Last Supper"	Nominee	
2003	Stephen King	"Harvey's Dream"	Nominee	
2003	Joyce Carol Oates	"The Haunting"	Nominee	
2003	George Saunders	"The Red Bow"	Nominee	
2004	Nancy Etchemendy	"Nimitseahpah"	Winner	
2004	Gary A. Braunbeck	"Just Out of Reach"	Nominee	
2004	Douglas Clegg	"A Madness of Starlings"	Nominee	
2004	John Farris	"Hunting Meth Zombies in the Great Nebraskan Wasteland"	Nominee	
2004	Margo Lanagan	"Singing My Sister Down"	Nominee	
2004	Chuck Palahniuk	"Guts"	Nominee	
2005	Gary A. Braunbeck	"We Now Pause for Station Identification"	Co-winners	
2005	Clive Barker	"Haeckel's Tale"	Nominee	
2005	Mort Castle	"As Others See Us"	Nominee	
2005	Yvonne Navarro	"Times of Atonement"	Nominee	
2005	Steve Rasnic Tem	"Invisible"	Nominee	
2006	Lisa Morton	"Tested"	Winner	
2006	Mort Castle	"FYI"	Nominee	
2006	Yvonne Navarro	"Feeding the Dead Inside"	Nominee	
2006	Gene O'Neill	"Balance"	Nominee	
2006	Stephen Volk	"31/10"	Nominee	
2007	David Niall Wilson	"The Gentle Brush of Wings"	Winner	
2007	C. Dean Andersson	"The Death Wagon Rolls on By"	Nominee	
2007	John Everson	"Letting Go"	Nominee	
2007	Paul G. Tremblay	"The Teacher"	Nominee	
2007	Paul G. Tremblay	"There's No Light Between Floor"	Nominee	
2007	Lisa Tuttle	"Closet Dreams"	Nominee	
2008	Sarah Langan	"The Lost"	Winner	
2008	Scott Edelman	"Petrified"	Nominee	
2008	Nick Mamatas and Tim Pratt	"The Dude Who Collected Lovecraft"	Nominee	
2008	M. Rickert	"Evidence of Love in A Case of Abandonment"	Nominee	
2008	Lee Thomas	"Turtle"	Nominee	
2009	Norman Prentiss	"In the Porches of My Ears"	Winner	
2009	Nate Kenyon	"Keeping Watch"	Nominee	
2009	Weston Ochse	"The Crossing of Aldo Ray"	Nominee	
2009	Harry Shannon	"The Night Nurse"	Nominee	
2010	Joe R. Lansdale	"The Folding Man"	Winner	
2010	Gary A. Braunbeck	"Return to Mariabronn"	Nominee	
2010	Lisa Mannetti	"1925; A Fall River Halloween"	Nominee	
2010	Nate Southard	"In the Middle of Poplar Street"	Nominee	
2010	Mark W. Worthen	"Final Draft"	Nominee	
2011	Stephen King	"Herman Wouk is Still Alive"	Winner	
2011	Adam-Troy Castro	"Her Husband's Hands"	Nominee	
2011	Ken Lillie-Paetz	"Hypergraphia"	Nominee	
2011	Gene O'Neill	"Graffiti Sonata"	Nominee	
2011	George Saunders	"Home"	Nominee	
2011	Kaaron Warren	"All You Can Do Is Breathe"	Nominee	
2012	Lucy Snyder	"Magdala Amygdala"	Winner	
2012	Bruce Boston	"Surrounded by the Mutant Rain Forest"	Nominee	
2012	Joe McKinney	"Bury My Heart at Marvin Gardens"	Nominee	
2012	Weston Ochse	"Righteous"	Nominee	
2012	John Palisano	"Available Light"	Nominee	
2013	David Gerrold	"Night Train to Paris"	Winner	
2013	Michael Bailey	"Primal Tongue"	Nominee	
2013	Patrick Freivald	"Snapshot"	Nominee	
2013	Lisa Mannetti	"The Hunger Artist"	Nominee	
2013	John Palisano	"The Geminis"	Nominee	
2013	Michael Reaves	"Code 666"	Nominee	
2014	Usman T. Malik	"The Vaporization Enthalpy of a Peculiar Pakistani Family"	Co-Winner	
2014	Rena Mason	"Ruminations"	Co-Winner	
2014	Hal Bodner	"Hot Tub"	Nominee	
2014	Sydney Leigh	"Baby's Breath"	Nominee	
2014	John Palisano	"Splinterette"	Nominee	
2014	Damien Angelica Walters	"The Floating Girls: A Documentary"	Nominee	
2015	John Palisano	"Happy Joe's Rest Stop"	Winner	
2015	Kate Jonez	"All the Day You'll Have Good Luck"	Nominee	
2015	Gene O'Neill	"The Algernon Effect"	Nominee	
2015	Damien Angelica Walters	"Sing Me Your Scars"	Nominee	
2015	Alyssa Wong	"Hungry Daughters of Starving Mothers"	Nominee	
2016	Joyce Carol Oates	"The Crawl Space"	Winner	
2016	Michael Bailey	"Time is a Face on the Water"	Nominee	
2016	Hal Bodner	"A Rift in Reflection"	Nominee	
2016	Christopher Golden	"The Bad Hour"	Nominee	
2016	Lisa Mannetti	"ArbeitMacht Frei"	Nominee	
2017	Lisa Mannetti	"Apocalypse Then"	Winner	
2017	Michael Bailey	"I Will Be the Reflection Until the End"	Nominee	
2017	James Chambers	"A Song Left Behind in the Aztakea Hills"	Nominee	
2017	Annie Neugebauer	"So Sings the Siren"	Nominee	
2017	Mercedes M. Yardley	"Loving You Darkly"	Nominee	
2018	Jess Landry	"Mutter"	Winner	
2018	Lee Murray	"Dead End Town"	Nominee	
2018	Annie Neugebauer	"Glove Box"	Nominee	
2018	John F. D. Taff	"A Winter's Tale"	Nominee	
2018	Kyla Lee Ward	"And in Her Eyes the City Drowned"	Nominee	
2019	Gwendolyn Kiste	"The Eight People Who Murdered Me (Excerpt from Lucy Westenra’s Diary)"	Winner	
2019	Greg Chapman	"The Book of Last Words"	Nominee	
2019	Jess Landry	"Bury Me in Tar and Twine"	Nominee	
2019	Cindy O'Quinn	"Lydia"	Nominee	
2019	Tim Waggoner	"A Touch of Madness"	Nominee	
2020	Josh Malerman	"One Last Transformation"	Winner	
2020	Meghan Arcuri	"Am I Missing the Sunlight?"	Nominee	
2020	Kurt Fawver	"Introduction to the Horror Story, Day 1"	Nominee	
2020	Cindy O'Quinn	"The Thing I Found Along a Dirt Patch Road"	Nominee	
2020	Kyla Lee Ward	"Should Fire Remember the Fuel?"	Nominee	
2021	Lee Murray	"Permanent Damage"	Winner	
2021	Carol Gyzander	"The Yellow Crown"	Nominee	
2021	Cindy O'Quinn	"A Gathering at the Mountain"	Nominee	
2021	Anna Taborska	"Two Shakes Of A Dead Lamb’s Tail"	Nominee	
2021	Kyla Lee Ward	"A Whisper in the Death Pit"	Nominee	
2022	Aaron Dries	"Nona Doesn’t Dance"	Nominee	
2022	Douglas Gwilym	"Poppy’s Poppy"	Nominee	
2022	J. A. W. McCarthy	"The Only Thing Different Will Be the Body"	Nominee	
2022	Anna Taborska	"A Song for Barnaby Jones"	Nominee	
2022	Anna Taborska	"The Star"	Nominee	
2022	Mercedes M. Yardley	"Fracture"	Winner	
2023
2023	Cindy O’Quinn	Quondam	Winner	
2023	L.E. Daniels	Silk	Nominee	
2023	Rachael K. Jones	The Sound of Children Screaming	Nominee	
2023	Sam J. Miller	If Someone You Love Has Become a Vurdalak	Nominee	
2023	Nadine Aurora Tabing	An Inherited Taste	Nominee	
2024
2024	Laird Barron	Versus Versus	Winner	
2024	Rachel Bolton	“And She Had Been So Reasonable”	Nominee	
2024	Sasha Brown	To the Wolves	Nominee	
2024	R. A. Busby	Ten Thousand Crawling Children	Nominee	
2024	Raven Jabukowski	She Sheds Her Skin	Nominee	
2025	R.J. Joseph	Inheritance	Winner	
2025	L.E. Daniels	Stomata	Finalist	
2025	Jocelyn Szczepaniak-Gillece	Saint Dymphna’s School for Borderland Girls	Finalist	
2025	Anna Taborska	[Ir]reversible	Finalist	
2025	Champ Wongsatayanont	Autogas Ferryman	Finalist	
