= Hurt People Hurt People =

Hurt People Hurt People may also refer to:

- "Hurt People Hurt People", a 2019 song by the Script from the album Sunsets & Full Moons
- "Hurt People Hurt People", a 2025 song by the Wildhearts from the album Satanic Rites of the Wildhearts
- "Hurt People Hurt People", a 2025 song by Mudvayne
- "Hurt People Hurt People", a 2020 poem by Michael Bailey
- "Hurt People, Hurt People", a 2023 television episode of the reality series Teen Mom: The Next Chapter
- "Laplace's Angel (Hurt People? Hurt People!)", a 2020 song by Will Wood from the album The Normal Album
