= Nebula Awards Showcase 2016 =

2016 anthology edited by Mercedes Lackey

- Cover of first edition
- Editor: Mercedes Lackey
- Cover artist: Reiko Murakami
- Language: English
- Series: Nebula Awards Showcase
- Genre: Science fiction and fantasy
- Publisher: Pyr
- Publication date: 2016
- Publication place: United States
- Media type: Print (paperback)
- Pages: 412
- ISBN: 978-1-63388-138-9
- OCLC: 918283000
- Preceded by: Nebula Awards Showcase 2015
- Followed by: Nebula Awards Showcase 2017

Nebula Awards Showcase 2016 is an anthology of science fiction and fantasy short works edited by Mercedes Lackey. It was first published in trade paperback by Pyr in May 2016.

== Summary ==
The book collects pieces that won or were nominated for the Nebula Awards for best novel, novella, novelette and short story for the year 2014 (presented in 2015), and nonfiction pieces related to the awards, together with an introduction by the editor and a list of past Nebula Award winners. Nominees for the Best Novella award are represented by excerpts, as is the winner of the Best Novel award (nominees for Best Novel are omitted).

== Contents ==
- "Introduction" (Mercedes Lackey)
- "About The Science Fiction and Fantasy Writers of America"
- "About the Nebula Awards"
- "2014 Nebula Awards Ballot"
- "A Stretch of Highway Two Lanes Wide" [Best Short Story nominee, 2015] (Sarah Pinsker)
- "The Breath of War" [Best Short Story nominee, 2015] (Aliette de Bodard)
- "The Vaporization Enthalpy of a Peculiar Pakistani Family" [Best Short Story nominee, 2015] (Usman T. Malik)
- "The Meeker and the All-Seeing Eye" [Best Short Story nominee, 2015] (Matthew Kressel)
- "When It Ends, He Catches Her" [Best Short Story nominee, 2015] (Eugie Foster)
- "The Fisher Queen" [Best Short Story nominee, 2015] (Alyssa Wong)
- "Jackalope Wives" [Best Short Story winner, 2015] (Ursula Vernon)
- "Sleep Walking Now and Then" [Best Novelette nominee, 2015] (Richard Bowes)
- "The Devil in America" [Best Novelette nominee, 2015] (Kai Ashante Wilson)
- "The Husband Stitch" [Best Novelette winner, 2015] (Carmen Maria Machado)
- "The Magician and Laplace's Demon" [Best Novelette nominee, 2015] (Tom Crosshill)
- "We Are the Cloud" [Best Novelette nominee, 2015] (Sam J. Miller)
- "A Guide to the Fruits of Hawai'i" [Best Novelette winner, 2015] (Alaya Dawn Johnson)
- "Calendrical Regression" [Best Novella nominee, 2015 (excerpt)] (Lawrence M. Schoen)
- "The Mothers of Voorhisville" [Best Novella nominee, 2015 (excerpt)] (M. Rickert)
- "The Regular" [Best Novella nominee, 2015 (excerpt)] (Ken Liu)
- "Grand Jeté (The Great Leap)" [Best Novella nominee, 2015 (excerpt)] (Rachel Swirsky)
- "We Are All Completely Fine" [Best Novella nominee, 2015 (excerpt)] (Daryl Gregory)
- "Yesterday's Kin" [Best Novella winner, 2015] (Nancy Kress)
- Annihilation [Best Novel winner, 2015 (excerpt)] (Jeff VanderMeer)
- "Past Nebula Award Winners"

== Reception ==
Publishers Weekly calls the anthology a "thought-provoking sample of Nebula Award nominees and winners spotlight[ing] the best of science fiction and fantasy published in 2014." After discussing the Johnson, Pinsker, Wong, Liu, Foster, VanderMeer, and Kress pieces individually, it concludes that "[e]ach of these tales offers something compelling and the collection will appeal to a wide range of tastes."

Brandon Sanford, writing in the Portland Book Review, takes issue with the editor's introductory disclaimer that the contents "probably won’t be what the 'average reader' would like," feeling it "reeks of elitism, or defensiveness," and detects "a certain irony to declaiming popular taste and then releasing a collection for popular consumption." Regardless, he finds "a lot to love about Nebula Awards Showcase 2016, even for the 'average reader.'" He describes the short stories as "beautiful gems, polished to perfection" and the novelettes as "all entertaining and unique, though some are not as successful as others – perhaps suffering from a lack of brevity." He assesses the novella winner as "spectacularly wonderful ... leav[ing] the reader wanting more," but the excerpts of the other novella nominees as "a little awkward, like textual book trailers stuck showing only one scene. Some give tastes of the skill that won their nomination, while others do not dazzle with such a limited glimpse." He feels the novel winner excerpt "does not reveal much and, because of this, promises inscrutable mysteries and tense, psychological thrills in a surreal landscape." Over all, he determines each story "has immersive characters for the reader to climb inside and abide in for awhile," and recommends the book as "well worth your time."

Clay Kallam in the San Jose Mercury News also finds irony in Mercedes Lackey, "best known for professionally written but seriously lightweight fantasies," editing "fiction that [is] supposed to make you uncomfortable." He finds in the book's selections a "tug-of-war" between stories "quite clearly meant to be literature, and others ... more focused on entertainment." He cites the Foster piece as an instance of the former, the Kress piece as an example of the latter, and the Vernon as one combining both traits: "[I]f as a reader you land on one side of the fence or the other, you're bound to be a little disappointed, because half of the book won't make you happy. ... So on the one hand, this is a rather lukewarm recommendation for these books, but on the other, they show the depth and creative power of the genre."

The anthology was also reviewed by Norman Spinrad in Asimov's Science Fiction, v. 40, no. 10/11, Oct./Nov. 2016, and Lynne Bispham in Vector 284, summer 2016.
