= Rena Mason =

American novelist

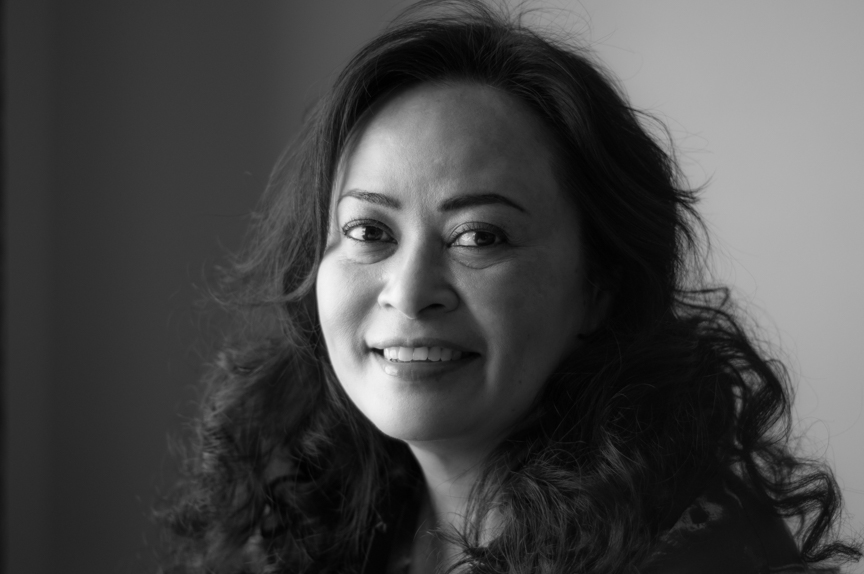
- Born: Nakhon Sawan, Thailand
- Education: State University of New York
- Occupations: Novelist; short story writer
- Writing career
- Language: English
- Genres: Horror; science fiction; fantasy; speculative fiction
- Notable works: East End Girls; The Evolutionist; "The Devil's Throat"
- Notable awards: Bram Stoker Award for Best First Novel (2013); Bram Stoker Award for Best Long Fiction (2014, 2018)
- Website: renamason.ink

Rena Mason is an American horror fiction author of Thai-Chinese descent and a three-time winner of the Bram Stoker Award.

She was born in Nakhon Sawan, Thailand. She has a State University of New York nursing license.

Her literary debut, The Evolutionist, won the Bram Stoker Award for Best First Novel in 2013, while her novella East End Girls was nominated for the Bram Stoker Award for Best Long Fiction the same year.

Her 2014 short story "Ruminations" tied for the Bram Stoker Award for Short Fiction. That same year, she was a quarter-finalist in the 2014 first annual Stage 32/The Blood List Search for New Blood screenwriting contest for her screenplay Rippers co-written with Norman L. Rubinstein.

She also received a 2014 Silver Hammer Award from the Horror Writers Association, given in recognition of extraordinary volunteerism by a member of the association. In 2018, her novelette The Devils Throat won the Bram Stoker Award for Best Long Fiction.

She has published short stories in various magazines and anthologies. She is a member of the Horror Writers Association, Mystery Writers of America, International Thriller Writers, and International Screenwriters' Association.

Retired as a registered nurse, Mason lives between Reno, Nevada, and Longbranch, Washington.

== Selected works ==
- "The Eyes Have It". Horror for Good: A Charitable Anthology (Volume 1). Cutting Block Press. 2012.
- "Awk-Ward". The Haunted Mansion Project: Year Two, edited by Loren Rhoads. Damnation Books. 2013.
- “Death Squared”. Fear the Reaper, edited by Joe Mynhardt. Crystal Lake Publishing. 2013.
- East End Girls, co-authored with Gord Rollo. JournalStone. 2013.
- "Reclamation". Getting Better All the Time: Las Vegas Writers Explore Progress, edited by Scott Dickensheets. Huntington Press. 2013.
- The Evolutionist. Nightscape Press. 2013.
- "Ruminations. Qualia Nous, edited by Michael Bailey. Written Backwards. 2014.
- “The Year After Publication…” Horror 101: The Way Forward. Crystal Lake Publishing. 2014.
- “Fathoms’ Embrace”. Another Dimension Anthology, edited by Angel McCoy. Wily Writers. 2015.
- “Jaded Winds”. The Library of the Dead, edited by Michael Bailey. Written Backwards. 2015.
- “Nita Kula”. Blurring the Line, edited by Marty Young. Cohesion Press. 2015.
- “Red Hill”. Shadows Over Main Street: An Anthology of Small-Town Lovecraftian Terror, edited by Doug Murano and D. Alexander Ward. Hazardous Press. 2015.
- “What Happened in Vegas…”. Shrieks and Shivers, edited by Jeani Rector. The Horror Zine. 2015.
- “Metamorphic Apotheosis”. Beauty of Death (Volume 1), edited by Alessandro Manzetti. Independent Legions Publishing. 2016.
- “Sky is Falling”. Madhouse, edited by Brad C. Hodson and Benjamin Kane Ethridge. Dark Regions Press. 2016
- “Winter’s Dollhouse”. Tales from the Lake (Volume 2), edited by E. Audsley, R.J. Cavender, and Joe Myndhart. Crystal Lake Publishing. 2016.
- “I Will Be the Making of You”. Adam’s Ladder, edited by Michael Bailey. Written Backwards. 2017.
- “Of Earth and Bone”. The Forsaken: Stories of Abandoned Places, edited by Joe McKinney and Mark Onspaugh. Cemetery Dance. 2017.
- “The Devil’s Throat”. Hellhole: An Anthology of Subterranean Terror, edited by Lee Murray. Adrenaline Press. 2018.
- “Clevengers of the Carrion Sea”. The Seven Deadliest, edited by Patrick Beltran and D. Alexander Ward. Cutting Block Books. 2019.
- Strange Tales of the Macabre: Haunted Journeys (edited). 5X5 Publishing. 2019.

== See also ==
- List of horror fiction writers
