= Her Husband's Hands =

2011 short story by Adam-Troy Castro

"Her Husband's Hands" is a science fiction short story by Adam-Troy Castro. It was first published in Lightspeed in October 2011.

== Synopsis ==
When Rebecca's husband Bob is killed in combat, the Army sends her all that they were able to salvage: his severed hands, with (as is standard) a backup copy of his personality and memories embedded within them. Rebecca must now deal with the fact that her husband has been reduced to a pair of disembodied animate hands with life-support bracelets, sensor patches in the fingertips... and post-traumatic stress disorder.

== Reception ==
"Her Husband's Hands" was a finalist for the Nebula Award for Best Short Story in 2011 and the 2011 Bram Stoker Award for Short Fiction; the French translation, "Les mains de son mari", was a finalist for the 2013 Grand prix de l'Imaginaire for foreign-language short fiction.

Rachel Swirsky said that she was "awed" by it, and described it as "dark, intensely written, and intimately and compassionately characterized". Locus called it "emotionally devastating". Tangent Online praised it as "dark and delightful", and appreciated the contrast between serious and "outlandish" elements, but admitted to some difficulties with suspension of disbelief — not in terms of the technology that keeps shreds of tissue alive and embedded with human minds, but rather in terms of why the military would go to the trouble of salvaging body parts and embedding them with human personalities, instead of "something more useful, like returning the veterans as small robots or attaching them to animals".
