= Horror for Good: A Charitable Anthology (Volume 1) =

2012 non-themed anthology

- First edition
- Editors: Mark Scioneaux, Robert S. Wilson and R. J. Cavender
- Author: Short story anthology; various authors
- Language: English
- Genre: Horror fiction
- Publisher: Cutting Block Press
- Publication date: 2012 (14 years ago)
- Publication place: United States
- ISBN: 9781475065367

Horror for Good: A Charitable Anthology (Volume 1) is a non-themed anthology of thirty-two horror short stories, featuring some of the biggest names in the horror fiction genre, including Joe R. Lansdale, Ramsey Campbell, Jack Ketchum, F. Paul Wilson, Ray Garton and Joe McKinney.

It was published by Cutting Block Press in 2012 and 100 percent of the proceeds will go to amfAR, a foundation for AIDS Research.

The anthology was co-edited by Mark Scioneaux, Robert S. Wilson and R. J. Cavender.

Scioneaux, Horror for Good founder, writes in his original introduction that "The heart of the horror community is on full display, and it stretches from the very top with Horror Writers Association President Rocky Wood, all the way to an author whose first ever published work will appear in these pages. The Horror Community has heart!"

Scioneaux adds, "The authors contained within these pages are a mix of some of the brightest stars and some of the most promising new talent in horror. They have donated their stories, consisting of rare reprints, personal favorites, and brand new, never-before-published tales."

The anthology premiered at the World Horror Convention in Salt Lake City, Utah in March 2012.

== Table of contents ==
- A Message from the HWA President ~ Rocky Wood
- The Journey of Horror for Good ~ Mark C. Scioneaux
- Autumn as Metaphor ~ G. N. Braun
- On a Dark October ~ Joe R. Lansdale
- Mouth ~ Nate Southard
- Blood for the American People ~ Lisa Morton
- Reception ~ Ray Garton
- The Long Hunt ~ Ian Harding
- The Apocalypse Ain't So Bad ~ Jeff Strand
- The Gift ~ Monica O'Rourke
- The Silent Ones ~ Taylor Grant
- Sky of Brass, Land of Iron ~ Joe McKinney
- Consanguinity ~ Lorne Dixon
- Dead Letters ~ Ramsey Campbell
- The Monster in the Drawer ~ Wrath James White
- Baptism ~ Tracie McBride
- Atlantis Purging ~ Boyd E. Harris
- Returns ~ Jack Ketchum
- The Other Patrick ~ Brad C. Hodson
- A Question of Morality ~ Shaun Hutson
- The Meat Man ~ Jonathan Templar
- A Man in Shape Alone ~ Lee Thomas
- Solution ~ Benjamin Kane Ethridge
- To and Fro ~ Richard Salter
- Please Don't Hurt Me ~ F. Paul Wilson
- The Depravity of Inanimate Things ~ John F. D. Taff
- The Lift ~ G. R. Yeates
- The Eyes Have It ~ Rena Mason
- Road Flowers ~ Gary McMahon
- The Widows Laveau ~ Steven W. Booth & Norman L. Rubenstein
- This Thing That Clawed Itself Inside Me ~ John Mantooth
- Somewhere on Sebastian Street ~ Stephen Bacon
- June Decay ~ Danica Green
- Shiva, Open Your Eye ~ Laird Barron

== See also ==
- Lists of books
