= Laurel Hightower =

Laurel Hightower is an American writer of horror, paralegal, and podcaster.

In 2022 Hightower was nominated for the Bram Stoker Award for Best Long Fiction for her novel Below. Prior to that, she received the 2020 This is Horror Best Novella Award for Crossroads.

== Bibliography ==
=== Novels ===
- Whispers in the Dark (2018, JournalStone)
- Crossroads (2020, novella, Off Limits Press)
- Below (2022, Ghoulish Books)
- Silent Key (2023, Flame Tree Press)
- The Day of the Door (2024, Ghoulish Books)
- The Long Low Whistle (2025, Shortwave Publishing)

=== Collections and anthologies ===
==== Collections ====
- Every Woman Knows This (2023, Death Knell Press)

==== Anthologies ====
- Places We Fear to Tread (2020, Cemetery Gates Media)
- Midnight in the Pentagram (2020)
- A Krampus Carol: Gothic Blue Book VI (2020, Burial Day Books)
- We Are Wolves (2020)
- ProleSCARYet: Tales of Horror and Class Warfare (2021, Rad Flesh Press)
- What One Wouldn't Do: An Anthology on the Lengths One Might Go To (2021)
- Diabolica Americana (2021, Keith Anthony Baird)
- A Woman Built by Man (2022, Cemetery Gates Media)
- SLASH-HER A Women of Horror Anthology (2022, Kandisha Press)
- Something Bad Happened (2022)
- Drei Geisternovellen (2022, Festa Verlag)
- The Dead Inside (2022, Dark Dispatch)
- Terror in the Trench: An Anthology of Aquatic Horror (2022, Dead Sea Press)
- Shattered & Splintered (2022)
- It Was All A Dream: An Anthology of Bad Horror Tropes Done Right (2022, Hungry Shadow Press)
- Hell Hath Only Fury (2022)
- Tales From Between: Words & Pictures (2022)
- Obsolescence: A Dark Sci-Fi, Fantasy, and Horror Anthology (2023, Shortwave Media)
- Broken Olive Branches (2024)
- Elemental Forces: Horror Short Stories (2024, Flame Tree Publishing)
- The Rack: Stories Inspired by Vintage Horror Paperbacks (2024, “Mightier Than Bullets”, Thomas E. Deady)
- Of Shadows, Stars, and Sabers: An Anthology (2025, Stars and Sabers Publishing)
