= Martin L. Shoemaker =

American computer programmer and science fiction author

- Born: Michigan, USA
- Occupations: Computer programmer, author
- Writing career
- Genre: science fiction
- Website: shoemaker.space

Martin L. Shoemaker is an American computer programmer and science fiction author, active in the field since 2011.

== Biography ==
Shoemaker is the third of four children of John and Dawn Shoemaker from Byron Center. A lifelong resident of West Michigan, he lived in Monterey Township in 2015. He was educated at Byron Center High School, the University of Michigan and Grand Valley State University. He attributes his love of reading and creative urge and work ethic to his parents while citing Star Trek and the televised Apollo Moon landings as influences on his interest in science fiction. Shoemaker has described himself as "a programmer who writes on the side." A second place win in the Jim Baen Memorial Writing Contest rewarded him with a lunch with astronaut Buzz Aldrin.

== Literary career ==
Shoemaker's work has appeared in various periodicals, webzines, podcasts and anthologies, including Analog Science Fiction/Science Fact, The Best Science Fiction of the Year: Volume One, Clarkesworld, Digital Science Fiction, Forever Magazine, Galaxy's Edge, The Glass Parachute, Humanity 2.0, Little Green Men: Attack!, Nebula Awards Showcase 2017, Time Travel Tales, Trajectories, Writers of the Future Volume 31, The Year's Best Science Fiction: Thirty-First Annual Collection, The Year's Best Science Fiction: Thirty-Third Annual Collection, The Year's Best Science Fiction and Fantasy 2016, Year's Top Short SF Novels 4, and The Year's Top Ten Tales of Science Fiction 8.

== Bibliography ==
=== Novels ===
- Today I Am Carey (2019)
- The Last Dance (Near-Earth Mysteries 1, 2019)
- The Last Campaign (Near-Earth Mysteries 2, 2020)

=== Short fiction ===
Collections

- Family Secrets (2017)
- Blue collar space (2018)
- HMI : Human-Machine Interface (2019)

Stories

Title	Year	First published	Reprinted/collected	Notes
The night we flushed the Old Town	2011		Blue collar space (2018)	The Corporation of Tycho Under
Father-daughter outing	2011		Blue collar space (2018)	The Corporation of Tycho Under
Gruff riders	2012			
Not another vacuum story	2012		Blue collar space (2018)	The Corporation of Tycho Under
Scramble	2012		Chapbook version, 2015; Blue collar space (2018)	The Corporation of Tycho Under
Not close enough	2013		Blue collar space (2018)	The Corporation of Tycho Under
Murder on the Aldrin Express	2013		Blue collar space (2018)	Captain Nick Aames
Unrefined	2014		Blue collar space (2018)	
Today I am Paul	2015	Shoemaker, Martin L. (August 2015). "Today I am Paul". Clarkesworld Magazine.		See also the novel Today I am Carey (2019)
Il gran cavallo	2013		Chapbook, 2015	
The troll under the fridge	2014			
Pallbearers	2014		Chapbook, 2015	
The Mother Anthony	2014			
Racing to Mars	2015	Shoemaker, Martin L. (September 2015). "Racing to Mars". Analog Science Fiction and Fact. 135 (9): 8–30.	Blue collar space (2018)	Novelette; Captain Nick Aames
Brigas Nunca Mais	2015	Shoemaker, Martin L. (March 2015). "Brigas Nunca Mais". Analog Science Fiction and Fact. 135 (3): 32–43.	Blue collar space (2018)	Captain Nick Aames
In its shadow	2016			
Early warning	2016	Shoemaker, Martin L. (April 2016). "Early warning". Analog Science Fiction and Fact. 136 (4): 57–61.		
The vampire's new clothes	2016			
Bookmarked	2016			
Green girls blues	2016			
Visits (with a stranger)	2016			
Black orbit	2016			
Meet the landlord	2017			
A Hamal in Hollywood	2017			
Not far enough	2017			
Mama's little angel	2017			
One last chore for Grandpa	2017			
Action figures	2018			
It came from the coffee maker	2018			

=== Nonfiction ===
- "Jack McDevitt, History Builder" (2018)

== Awards ==
"Scramble" won second place in the Jim Baen Memorial Writing Contest. "Murder on the Aldrin Express" placed second in the 2013 Analog Analytical Laboratory Award for Best Novella. "Not Close Enough" placed second in the 2013 Analog Analytical Laboratory Award for Best Novelette. Unrefined took third place in the Writers of the Future contest, 2014. "Racing to Mars" won the Analog Analytical Laboratory Award for Best Novelette. "Today I Am Paul" won the Washington Science Fiction Society's Small Press Award, was nominated for the 2016 Nebula Award for Best Short Story, and placed 22nd in the 2016 Locus Award for Best Short Story. "Not Far Enough" placed fifth in the 2017 Analog Analytical Laboratory Award for Best Novella.
