= The Vaporization Enthalpy of a Peculiar Pakistani Family =

2014 short story by Usman T. Malik

"The Vaporization Enthalpy of a Peculiar Pakistani Family" is a short science fiction story by Pakistani author Usman T. Malik. Inspired by Sufi poetry and music, Malik attended the Clarion West Writers Workshop for aspiring sci-fi and fantasy writers. Motivated by his success with the workshop, Malik began writing and ultimately led the first speculative writing workshop in Lahore, Pakistan. "The Vaporization Enthalpy of a Peculiar Pakistani Family" is a story about family relationships, the rough lifestyle in Pakistan. It is published worldwide.

== Plot ==
"The Vaporization Enthalpy of a Peculiar Pakistani Family" includes two main characters: Tara and her younger brother Sohail. The story begins with Sohail mourning over the loss of his love, Gulminay. Too distraught, Sohail leaves Tara behind with their mother, referred to as "Ma'' and goes to the mountains. Months later, Ma dies due to sickness and old age. Left all alone, Tara decides to go to the city to live with her mother's cousin Wasif. Looking back on her life, Tara goes through the painful memories of being taken out of school at thirteen and being a widow at sixteen. After returning to school for two years, Tara enrolls in the BS program at Punjab University. Soon, the city suffers from extreme flooding, with devastating damages. Wasif and Tara volunteer to restore the community. When witnessing multiple dead bodies, and helping injured people, Tara remembers her brother. Due to rampant terrorist attacks in Pakistan and struggles in the city, Tara leaves and heads for the mountains. After weeks of travel, she is finally reunited with Sohail. Even though both brother and sister went through multiple tragedies, they found peace once they reconnected.

== Analysis ==
This story takes place in Pakistan, but does not specify where. The characters often mention places vaguely using phrases such as, "the City", or "the Mountains". The main character Tara also enrolls in Punjab University located in Lahore, Pakistan. Details in the story describing terrorist attacks and suicide bombings, suggest the story takes place during a violent time period in Pakistan.

Malik shows how this story is similar to Pakistan; the story is built on the debris of suicide bombers, drone strikes, floods, and many other miseries of present-day Pakistan. Both Tara and Sohail facing the tragedies that happened to them like Gulminay's death, although gory, are easy for readers to picture.

== Awards and nominations ==
| Year | Award | Category | Result | Ref. |
|---|---|---|---|---|
| 2014 | Stoker Awards | Short Fiction | Joint winner | |
| 2015 | Locus Awards | Best Short Story | 11th | |
| 2015 | Nebula Awards | Best Short Story | Nominated | |

== Publication history ==
| Title | Date | Author | Publisher/Publisher Series |
|---|---|---|---|
| Qualia Nous | Aug 2014 | ed. Michael Bailey | Written Backwards |
| The Best Science Fiction & Fantasy of the Year: Volume Nine | May 2015 | ed. Jonathan Strahan | Solarius |
| The Best Science Fiction & Fantasy of the Year: Volume Nine | May 2015 | ed. Jonathan Strahan | Solarius |
| Nebula Awards Showcase 2016 | May 2016 | ed. Mercedes Lackey | Pyr |

== Critical reception ==
Controversy exists over the genre of the story. Some readers would consider it science fiction because of references to chemistry and monsters throughout the story. Other readers believe that while there is a scientific factor, the story commentates on the terrorist attacks in Pakistan, possibly signifying a warning. Regardless of the genre specification, the story appropriately depicts the terrors that occur in Pakistan, and what life can be like for some of the people who live there.
