= Unchained and Unhinged =

Book by Joe R. Lansdale

- Artwork by Glenn Chadbourne
- Author: Joe R. Lansdale
- Cover artist: Glenn Chadbourne
- Language: English
- Genre: Horror, contains short stories and essays
- Publisher: Subterranean Press
- Publication date: 2009
- Publication place: United States
- Media type: Print hardcover, limited edition
- Pages: 143
- ISBN: 978-1-59606-225-2
- Preceded by: Sanctified and Chicken-Fried (2009)
- Followed by: The Best of Joe R. Lansdale (2010)

Unchained and Unhinged is a limited edition book written by American author Joe R. Lansdale. It contains both essays and fictional short stories. This book was published exclusively by Subterranean Press in 2009 and has since sold out.

== Table of contents ==
- Introduction-An Adventure in Quick Reading
- Lansdale Unchained (essays)
- Just Do It
- Lansdale Unchained: Robert E. Howard and the world of Almuric
- Little Boys Unite
- Typewriter Mystique, the Bull of it
- Kuttner Sharpens his Literary Sword
- Leslie Whitten: Neglected Master

- Lansdale Unhinged (stories)
- Surveillance
- Coat
- Dragon Chili: from the Grand Church Cookbook
- Big Man: a Fable
- Jack's Pecker
- Hanging
- Little Kitty
- Hole
- December
- Rainy Weather
