= Michael Bailey (editor) =

American editor and author (1979–present)

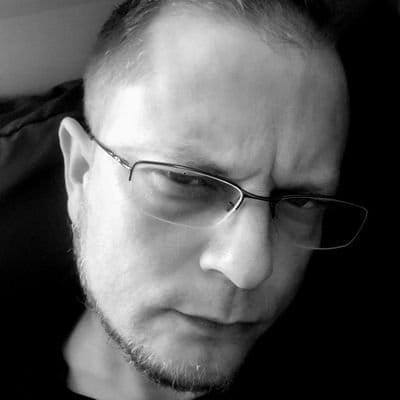
- Born: February 18, 1979; Hangtown, California, U.S.
- Occupations: Author, Editor, Screenwriter
- Writing career
- Genres: Horror, Science fiction, Speculative, Mystery, Western, Thriller, Nonfiction
- Website: nettirw.com

Michael Bailey (born February 18, 1979) is an American writer and editor who primarily works with horror and science fiction. His work occasionally blends into other genres such as mystery, western, and thriller, usually with a speculative angle. Most of his fiction and poetry can be categorized as psychological or literary horror. He has authored numerous novels, novellas, novelettes, and fiction & poetry collections.

Some of his writing mentors include Douglas E. Winter, F. Paul Wilson, Gary A. Braunbeck, and the late Jack Ketchum. He pays it forward by mentoring and coaching up-and-coming writers from around the world, and serves as a Senior Editor for an undisclosed publisher where he manages a team of developmental editors.

Along with being the screenwriter for Madness and Writers: The Untold Truth. Maybe?, he runs the small press Written Backwards and publishes anthologies and other unique books, most of which include poetry and illustrations. He also designs covers, provides interior layouts, and edits for various authors.

== Personal life ==
Bailey lives in Costa Rica where he is rebuilding his life after surviving one of the most catastrophic wildfires in California history, which is explored in his memoir Blink (previously known as Seven Minutes). When he is not working on his own projects, he spends his time mentoring and teaching writers how to improve their craft.

== Associations ==
- Authors Guild - Active member
- International Thriller Writers (ITW) - Active Member
- Horror Writers Association (HWA) – Active member
- Science Fiction & Fantasy Writers Association (SFWA) – Active Member
- Science Fiction & Fantasy Poetry Association (SFPA) – Active Member

== Filmography ==
- Take It to the Grave (2025), Producer
- Dead Format (forthcoming), Executive Producer
- Madness and Writers (forthcoming), Producer, Writer

== Bibliography ==
=== Novels ===
- Palindrome Hannah (2005), illustrated by Michael Ian Bateson
- Phoenix Rose (2009)
- Psychotropic Dragon (2021), illustrated by Daniele Serra, Glenn Chadbourne, L.A. Spooner, and Ty Scheuerman
- Hangtown (2023), illustrated by Mar Garcia
- Seen In Distant Stars (forthcoming)
- Esoterica (forthcoming)
- Sequoia (forthcoming)

=== Novellas ===
- Agatha's Barn (2020), tie-in to Carpenter's Farm by Josh Malerman, illustrated by Glenn Chadbourne
- A Rose / Arose (2021), later collected in Psychotropic Dragon
- The Call of the Void (2022), with Erinn L. Kemper
- Luminescent (forthcoming), with Gene O'Neill
- From Me Flows What You Call Time (forthcoming)

=== Novelettes ===
- Our Children, Our Teachers (2018)

=== Collections ===
- Scales and Petals (2010), with a graphic adaptation by L.A. Spooner
- Inkblots and Blood Spots (2014), illustrated by Daniele Serra
- Oversight (2018)
- The Impossible Weight of Life (2020)
- Sifting the Ashes (2022), with Marge Simon
- The Price of Feeling (forthcoming)

=== Anthologies ===
- Pellucid Lunacy (2010)
- Chiral Mad (2012), introduction by Thomas F. Monteleone
- Chiral Mad 2 (2013)
- The Library of the Dead (2015), illustrated by Gak
- Chiral Mad 3 (2016), introduction by Chuck Palahniuk
- You, Human: An Anthology of Dark Science Fiction, (2016), introduction by F. Paul Wilson, illustrated by Orion Zangara and L.A. Spooner
- Adam's Ladder (2017), co-edited with Darren Speegle
- Stokercon Anthology (2018), featuring Victor LaValle, Ramsey Campbell, Elizabeth Massie, Craig Engler, Caitlín R. Kiernan, and Sam Weller
- Chiral Mad 4: An Anthology of Collaborations (2018), co-edited with Lucy A. Snyder, introduction by Gary A. Braunbeck & Janet Harriett
- Miscreations: Gods, Monstrosities & Other Horrors (2020), co-edited with Doug Murano, introduction by Alma Katsu, illustrated by HagCult
- Prisms (2021), co-edited with Darren Speegle
- Chiral Mad 5 (2022), illustrated by Seth Brown
- Qualia Nous, Vol. 2 (2023), illustrated by Pat R. Steiner
- Long Division: Stories of Social Decay, Societal Collapse, and Bad Manners (2024), co-edited with Doug Murano
- Fumptruck: Open Letters, Essays, Fiction, Poetry, Artwork & Other Creations for & Inspired by the 47th President of the Divided States of America (2024), edited by Anonymous
- You, Human: An Anthology of Dark Science Fiction, Vol. 2, (2025), introduction by Maxwell I. Gold, illustrated by Orion Zangara and L.A. Spooner
- Silent Nightmares: Haunting Stories to Be Told on the Longest Night of the Year (2026), co-edited with Chuck Palahniuk, illustrated by Orion Zangara
- The Library of the Undead (forthcoming)

=== Nonfiction ===
- Righting Writing (2023)
- Blink (forthcoming)

=== Young Reader ===
- Ensō (2016), illustrated by L.A. Spooner
- Forever Velveteen (2025), illustrated by Vincent Chong

=== Miscellaneous ===
- A Little Aquamarine Book of Agitated Water by William Hope Hodgson (2022), a collection of rare fiction and poetry (editor)

== Awards ==
Year	Title	Award	Result	Ref.
2006	Palindrome Hannah	Independent Publisher Book Awards	Finalist	
2010	Pellucid Lunacy	American Book Fest	Winner	
2010	Pellucid Lunacy	International Book Awards	Winner	
2011	Scales and Petals	American Book Fest	Winner	
2011	Scales and Petals	International Book Awards	Winner	
2012	Chiral Mad	American Book Fest	Finalist	
2012	Chiral Mad	Foreword INDIES	Honorable mention	
2012	Chiral Mad	London Book Festival	Winner	
2012	Chiral Mad	Eric Hoffer Book Awards	Honorable mention	
2012	Chiral Mad	Eric Hoffer Award Grand Prize	Shortlist	
2012	Chiral Mad	Next Generation Indie Book Awards	Finalist	
2012	Chiral Mad	This is Horror Awards' Anthology of the Year	Runner-up	
2013	Chiral Mad 2	American Book Fest	Winner	
2013	Chiral Mad 2	Foreword INDIES	Finalist	
2013	Chiral Mad 2	Independent Publisher Book Awards	Winner (Silver)	
2013	Chiral Mad 2	Next Generation Indie Book Awards	Winner	
2013	Chiral Mad 2	International Book Awards	Winner	
2013	Chiral Mad 2	Paris Book Festival	Runner-up	
2013	"Fireman / Primal Tongue"	Bram Stoker Award for Short Fiction	Nominee	
2014	Qualia Nous	American Book Fest	Finalist	
2014	Qualia Nous	Foreword INDIES	Winner (Bronze)	
2014	Qualia Nous	Bram Stoker Award for Anthology	Nominee	
2014	Qualia Nous	IBPA Book Awards / prev. Benjamin Franklin Awards (Independent Book Publishers Association)	Winner (Gold)	
2014	Qualia Nous	Independent Publisher Book Awards	Winner (Silver)	
2014	Qualia Nous	Next Generation Indie Book Awards	Finalist	
2015	The Library of the Dead	International Book Awards	Winner	
2015	The Library of the Dead	Bram Stoker Award for Anthology	Winner	
2016	Chiral Mad 3	Bram Stoker Award for Anthology	Nominee	
2016	Chiral Mad 3	Foreword INDIES	Finalist	
2016	Chiral Mad 3	International Book Awards	Winner	
2016	You, Human: An Anthology of Dark Science Fiction	IBPA Book Awards / prev. Benjamin Franklin Awards (Independent Book Publishers Association)	Winner (Silver)	
2016	"Time is a Face on the Water"	Bram Stoker Award for Short Fiction	Nominee	
2017	Adam's Ladder	Foreword INDIES	Finalist	
2017	“I Will Be the Reflection Until the End”	Bram Stoker Award for Short Fiction	Nominee	
2018	Chiral Mad 4	Shirley Jackson Award	Nominee	
2018	Our Children, Our Teachers	Bram Stoker Award for Long Fiction	Nominee	
2020	Agatha's Barn: A Carpenter's Farm Story	Shirley Jackson Award	Nominee	
2020	Miscreations: Gods, Monstrosities & Other Horrors	Bram Stoker Award for Anthology	Nominee	
2020	Miscreations: Gods, Monstrosities & Other Horrors	Shirley Jackson Award	Nominee	
2020	Miscreations: Gods, Monstrosities & Other Horrors	This is Horror Awards' Anthology of the Year	Winner	
2021	A Rose / Arose (Psychotropic Dragon)	Shirley Jackson Award	Nominee	
2021	Psychotropic Dragon	National Indie Excellence Awards	Finalist	-
2021	Psychotropic Dragon	International Book Awards	Finalist	
2022	Chiral Mad 5	Shirley Jackson Award	Nominee	
2022	Chiral Mad 5	Foreword INDIES	Finalist	
2022	Chiral Mad 5	Independent Publisher Book Awards	Winner (Silver)	
2022	Chiral Mad 5	The BookFest Awards	Second Place	
2022	Sifting the Ashes	Bram Stoker Award for Best Poetry Collection	Nominee	
2022	Sifting the Ashes	The Elgin Awards (Science Fiction & Fantasy Poetry Association)	Nominee	
2023	Righting Writing	Independent Publisher Book Awards	Winner (Silver)	
2023	Righting Writing	The BookFest Awards	First Place	
2023	Righting Writing	Eric Hoffer Book Awards	Finalist	
2023	Righting Writing	Imaginarium Imadjinn Awards	Finalist	
2023	Hangtown	The BookFest Awards	First Place	
2023	Hangtown	IBPA Book Awards / prev. Benjamin Franklin Awards (Independent Book Publishers Association)	Winner (Silver)	
2023	Hangtown	Eric Hoffer Book Awards	Nominee	
2023	"Apposite and Opposite"	Rhysling Awards	Nominee	
2023	Qualia Nous, Vol. 2	The BookFest Awards	Second Place	
2023	Qualia Nous, Vol. 2	International Book Awards	Finalist	
2023	Qualia Nous, Vol. 2	Next Generation Indie Book Award	Finalist	
2023	Qualia Nous, Vol. 2	Eric Hoffer Book Awards	Nominee	
2024	"Divide by Zero"	Rhysling Awards	Nominee	
2024	Long Division: Stories of Social Decay, Societal Collapse, and Bad Manners	Bram Stoker Award for Anthology	Nominee	
2024	Fumptruck: Open Letters, Essays, Fiction, Poetry, Artwork & Other Creations for & Inspired by the 47th President of the Divided States of America	Foreword INDIES	Finalist	
2024	Fumptruck: Open Letters, Essays, Fiction, Poetry, Artwork & Other Creations for & Inspired by the 47th President of the Divided States of America	The BookFest Awards	First Place	
2024	Fumptruck: Open Letters, Essays, Fiction, Poetry, Artwork & Other Creations for & Inspired by the 47th President of the Divided States of America	Next Generation Indie Book Award	Finalist	-
2024	Fumptruck: Open Letters, Essays, Fiction, Poetry, Artwork & Other Creations for & Inspired by the 47th President of the Divided States of America	National Indie Excellence Awards	Finalist	-
2024	Fumptruck: Open Letters, Essays, Fiction, Poetry, Artwork & Other Creations for & Inspired by the 47th President of the Divided States of America	Eric Hoffer Book Awards	Nominee	
2025	You, Human: An Anthology of Dark Science Fiction, Vol. 2	Foreword INDIES	Winner	
2025	You, Human: An Anthology of Dark Science Fiction, Vol. 2	Independent Publisher Book Awards	Winner (Gold)	
2025	You, Human: An Anthology of Dark Science Fiction, Vol. 2	National Indie Excellence Awards	Finalist	
2025	You, Human: An Anthology of Dark Science Fiction, Vol. 2	The BookFest Awards	First Place	
2025	Forever Velveteen	Eric Hoffer Book Awards	Nominee	
2025	"After the Screaming Stops"	Decennalia Expo	1st Place	
2026	"Superposition"	Stories of the Quantum Universe micro-fiction competition, Science Gallery London, held in collaboration with the Arthur C. Clark Award	Runner-up	

=== Accolades for works originally published by Michael Bailey ===
- Bram Stoker Award (long fiction), Winner – “The Great Pity” by Gary A. Braunbeck (Chiral Mad 2)
- Bram Stoker Award (short fiction), Nomination – “The Geminis” by John Palisano (Chiral Mad 2)
- Bram Stoker Award (short fiction), Winner – “Ruminations” by Rena Mason (Qualia Nous)
- Bram Stoker Award (short fiction), Winner – “The Vaporization Enthalpy of a Peculiar Pakistani Family” by Usman T. Malik (Qualia Nous)
- Bram Stoker Award (long fiction), Nomination – “Special Collections” by Norman Partridge (The Library of the Dead)
- Bram Stoker Award (short fiction), Nomination – “A Rift in Reflections” by Hal Bodner (Chiral Mad 3)
- Bram Stoker Award (long fiction), Nomination – “That Perilous Stuff” by Scott Edelman (Chiral Mad 3)
- Bram Stoker Award (long fiction), Nomination – “Faking it Until Forever Comes” by Scott Edelman (Liars, Fakers, and the Dead Who Eat Them)
- Bram Stoker Award (long fiction), Nomination – “The Jupiter Drop” by Josh Malerman (You, Human)
- Bram Stoker Award (short fiction), Winner – “One Last Transformation” by Josh Malerman (Miscreations: Gods, Monstrosities & Other Horrors)
- Bram Stoker Award (short fiction), Winner – “Versus Versus” by Laird Barron (Long Division: Stories of Social Decay, Societal Collapse, and Bad Manners, co-edited with Doug Murano)
- Nebula Award, Nomination – “The Vaporization Enthalpy of a Peculiar Pakistani Family” by Usman T. Malik (Qualia Nous)
- Rhysling Award (short poem), Winner “Shutdown” by Marge Simon (Qualia Nous)
- Rhysling Award (short poem), Nomination - “Dark Neighborhood” by Cindy O’Quinn (Chiral Mad 5)
- Rhysling Award (short poem), Nomination - “Seasonal Meat” by Jamal Hodge (Chiral Mad 5)
- Rhysling Award (short poem), Nomination - “Me” by Jamal Hodge (Qualia Nous, Vol. 2)
- The Best Horror of the Year, Vol. 5 included “Some Pictures in an Album” by Gary McMahon (Chiral Mad, 2011)
- Year’s Best Dark Fantasy & Horror: 2018 included “Swift to Chase” by Laird Barron (Adam’s Ladder, 2017)
- The Best Horror of the Year, Vol. 11 included “Golden Sun” by Richard Thomas, Kristi DeMeester, Damien Angelica Walters & Michael Wehunt (Chiral Mad 4)

== Publications ==
=== Long Fiction ===
- The Trial Chair (2010), later collected in Scales and Petals
- Dandelion Clocks (2014), later collected in Inkblots and Blood Spots
- SAD Face (2018), later collected in Oversight
- Darkroom (2018), later collected in Oversight
- Our Children, Our Teachers (2018)
- Articles of Teleforce (2018), Fantastic Tales of Terror, later collected in The Price of Feeling
- Somnambulism / I Summon Lambs (2021), later collected in Psychotropic Dragon
- Invisible Library (forthcoming)
- Toast Can't Never Be Bread Again (forthcoming)

=== Short Fiction ===
- "Unstitched Love" (2006), Something Weird, Australia; 2012, Something Wicked Anthology, Vol. 1 (South Africa)
- "Defenestrate" (2007), In Bad Dreams - Vol. 1: Where Real Life Awaits (Sweden)
- "Without Face" (2008), Something Wicked, Issue 6 (South Africa)
- "The Dying Gaul" (2010), The Phantom Queen Awakes (Sweden)
- "Golden Rule" (2010)
- "Wilted Flowers" (2010)
- "The Girl in the Red Flower Pattern Dress" (2010)
- "Empty Canvas" (2010)
- "Portrayal" (2010)
- "Yellow" (2010)
- "Small Print / Pylon" (2010)
- "I Wanted Black" (2010), Pellucid Lunacy
- "Plasty" (2010)
- "Habit" (2010)
- "The Shower Curtain Man" (2010)
- "Fix" (2010)
- "It Tears Away" (2011), The Shadow of the Unknown
- "A Light in the Closet" (2011), Beyond Centauri
- "Coulrophobic" (2012), Here There Be Clowns
- "The Mascot" (2012), Unnatural Tales of the Jackalope
- "Bootstrap / The Binds of Lasolastica" (2012), Zippered Flesh
- "Hiatus" (2012), Surviving the End (Australia)
- "Not the Child" (2012), Chiral Mad, writing as Julie Stipes
- "Scrub" (2012), Uncommon Assassins
- "Mum" (2013), Canopic Jars
- "Skinny" (2013), Anthology: Year Two, writing as Julie Stipes
- "Fireman / Primal Tongue (2013), Zippered Flesh 2
- "Brick House" (2014), Blight Digest
- "Time Is a Face on the Water" (2016), Borderlands 6
- "I Will Be the Reflection Until the End" (2017), Tales from the Lake, Vol. 4 (South Africa)
- "The Other Side of Semicolons" (2018), Monsters of Any Kind (Italy)
- "Essential Oils" (2018), 18 Wheels of Science Fiction
- "The Long White Line" (2018), Lost Highways
- "Fade to Black / White to Black" (2019), The Horror Book of Phobias
- "Speaking Cursive" (2018), Birthing Monsters: Frankenstein's Cabinet of Curiosities
- "Underwater Ferris Wheel" (2019), Best New Horror #29 (United Kingdom)
- "Eavesdropping" (2020)
- "Möbius" (2020), The Pulp Horror Book of Phobias, Vol. 2
- "Ghosts of Calistoga" (2020), Reflections
- "Gave" (2020), After Sundown
- "Hourglass" (2020)
- "Fragments of Br_an" (2020)
- "Emergence of the Colorless" (2020)
- "Oll Korrect" (2020)
- "Boketto / A Murmuration of Souls" (2020), Borderlands 7
- "Slo-Mo" (2022), Hybrid: Misfits, Monsters and Other Phenomena
- "I Have Seen the Elephant" (2022), Blood in the Soil, Terror on the Wind
- "Labyrinthine" (2023), Never Wake: An Anthology of Dream Horror
- "Genesis II" (2024), Fumptruck (anonymous)
- "The Speed of Healing" (2024), Bestiary of Blood: Modern Fables & Dark Tales
- "Asymmetry in Love" (2025), Fission #5: An Anthology of Stories (United Kingdom)
- "Superposition" (2025), Stories of the Quantum Universe (United Kingdom)
- "After the Screaming Stops” (2025), ZO Magazine
- "Still Life" (2026), Merganser Magazine
- "Reclamation" (2026), Brief Ecology: Life After Waste
- "Rapture" (2026), Silent Nightmares: Stories to Be Told on the Longest Night of the Year
- "The Shape of Entry" (2026), Infocalypse Arts & Literary Magazine
- "Continuance" (2026), Cynthia Pelayo's Substack: Halloween Micro Fiction
- "Ordinary Miracles" (2026), Holiday Horrors
- "The Wait of Water" (2027), Views from the Overlook: Stories from the World of Stephen King's The Shining
- "La Juventud Poseía" (2027), The Book of Demons

=== Graphic Adaptations ===
- "Plasty" (2018), illustrated by L.A. Spooner
- "Fade to Null" (2018), written by Brian Keene, illustrated by Daniele Serra, lettering by Michael Bailey

=== Poetry ===
- "The End of Time / The Seed, Part 1)" (2004), ART: Mag 27
- "Feast of Crows" (2004), The Harrow
- "The Box" (2005), The Harrow
- "Paper Sister" (2005), Palindrome Hannah
- "Strangers" (2005), Palindrome Hannah
- "The Most Beautiful Place" (2005), Palindrome Hannah
- "The End of Time" (2010)
- "Lost" (2010)
- "Mon Autumn" (2010)
- "Moth" (2010)
- "The Hand" (2010)
- "War" (2010)
- "Black" (2010)
- "The Betrayer" (2010)
- "The Start of Forever / The Seed, Part 2" (2010)
- "Sticks and Bones" (2011), Askew
- "Open Aura" (2012), Poe-It
- "All but the Things That Cannot Be Torn" (2013), Tales of Blood and Roses
- "Whisper Dance" (2013), Angels Cried
- "Ink" (2014), Jamais Vu: Journal of Strange Among the Familiar, Vol. 2
- "Beneath Clouds" (2014)
- "Alive" (2014)
- "The Two of You" (2014)
- "Bogey" (2014)
- "Void" (2014)
- "Simon the Parasite" (2014)
- "Listen to Me" (2014)
- "Twisted" (2014)
- "Secret Smile" (2014)
- "Though It Rains" (2014)
- "Countdown to Null" (2014)
- "Not Responding" (2014)
- "Shades of Red" (2019), HWA Poetry Showcase, Vol. VI
- "Loosed Earth" (2020)
- "Hurt People Hurt People" (2020)
- "Life (C)remains" (2020)
- "Lest We End" (2020)
- "Past the Past" (2020)
- "Blink" (2020)
- "Sands of Time" (2020)
- "Who Will Teach Them?" (2020)
- "The Nocturnal Waking Nightmare" (2020)
- "Paper Earth" (2020)
- "Apanthropy" (2020)
- "Night Rainbows" (2020)
- "Angel Wings of Death" (2022)
- "Orange Borealis" (2022)
- "Diggin' Ghosts" (2022)
- "Arcing" (2022)
- "Sleep, Child" (2022)
- "The Great Build-up" (2022)
- "First to Respond" (2022)
- "A Warning" (2022)
- "Freebird" (2022)
- "Weapons of Mass Distraction" (2022)
- "Kilned" (2022)
- "Blocked" (2022)
- "The Devil's Matchsticks" (2022)
- "23 Days" (2022)
- "Arachnid" (2022), The Call of the Void
- "Sleep, What Might It Bring (2022)
- "Birthday Deathbed" (2022)
- "Wings Outstretched" (2022)
- "Night-swimming" (2022)
- "Conflagration" (2022)
- "Crawling Mountains" (2022)
- "Weather, Simplified" (2022)
- "The Longest Drive" (2022)
- "Spread Thin" (2022)
- "What Day Is This?" (2022)
- "Moonscape" (2022)
- "The Aftermath" (2022)
- "Inspectors" (2022)
- "Phoenixes" (2022)
- "Price of Freedom" (2022)
- "Disposable Hazmat" (2022)
- "The Word" (2022)
- "Twins Unborn on 9/11" (2022)
- "Cartwheels" (2022)
- "Coverage" (2022)
- "Masked" (2022)
- "Take My Forest" (2022)
- "Wor(l)ds Dissolve" (2022)
- "Forever-Hungry Drums" (2022)
- "Startled Awake" (2022)
- "Let Me Go, Please" (2022)
- "Who Are You?" (2022)
- "One Vacant Lot" (2022)
- "Forecast" (2022)
- "A Recursive Cleanse" (2022)
- "Dispatch" (2022)
- "Trapped" (2022)
- "One of a Thousand Calls" (2022)
- "It's Probably Nothing" (2022)
- "Dear Deer" (2022)
- "Survivalism" (2022)
- "The Firegod Cometh" (2022), with Marge Simon
- "Pacific Gassed & Electrified" (2022), with Marge Simon
- "Clogged Ateries" (2022), with Marge Simon
- "Journey's End" (2022), with Marge Simon
- "In Media Res" (2022), with Marge Simon
- "There Until Remembered" (2022), with Marge Simon
- "A Return to Normalcy" (2022), with Marge Simon
- "Apposite and Opposite" (2023), HWA Poetry Showcase, Vol. X
- "Halo of Sunlight" (2024), Red Stars and Shattered Shields
- "Divide by Zero" (2025), The Rhysling Anthology
- "Well (D)read" (2026), Poisoned Soup for the Macabre, Depraved, and Insane
- "A Cephalopod's Lament" (2026), Waterborne
- "Insufferable Noise" (2026), Unbordered, Issue Five: Thresholds
- "Charting Distance from the Heart" (2026), HWA Poetry Showcase, Vol. XIII
- "Unmoored" (2026), TrashLight Press
- "To the Unmasked Self" (2026), Space & Time, No. 152
- "Unauthorized Territory" (2026), Science Fiction & Fantasy Poetry Association winner, dwarf form
- "Fear in Dust" (2026), Fear in Dust (pseudonym)
- "Life Chaotic" (2026), Apus 雨燕, Vol. 3: Suspension

=== Nonfiction / Essays ===
- "Intro / Outro" (2013), Chiral Mad 2
- "0-1" (2014), introduction to Qualia Nous
- "Why Charlaine Harris Matters" (2015), World Horror Convention Souvenir Book
- "Great Horror Is Something Alien" (2017), Where Nightmares Come From: The Art of Storytelling in the Horror Genre
- "Ah-ha: Beginning to End" (2018), with Chuck Palahniuk, It's Alive: Bringing Your Nightmares to Life
- "Anthologies: Someone's Gotta Do It" (2018), 2018 StokerCon Anthology
- "Introduction" (2018), Frozen Shadows and Other Chilling Stories by Gene O'Neill
- "The Longest Night of the Year" (2026), foreword to Silent Nightmares: Stories to Be Told on the Longest Night of the Year

== Book Design ==
- At the Lazy K (2015), by Gene O'Neill, introduction by Rena Mason, illustrated by L.A. Spooner
- Other Music (2016), by Marc Levinthal, introduction by John Skipp
- Bones Are Made to Be Broken (2016) by Paul Michael Anderson, introduction by Bracken MacCleod, foreword by Damien Angelica Walters, illustrated by Pat R. Steiner
- The Confessions of St. Zach (2016), by Gene O'Neill, introduction by John R. Little, illustrated by Orion Zangara
- The Burden of Indigo (2016), by Gene O'Neill, introduction by Lisa Morton, illustrated by Orion Zangara
- The Near Future (2017), by Gene O'Neill, introduction by Megan Arcuri, illustrated by Orion Zangara
- The Far Future (2017), by Gene O'Neill, introduction by Scott Edelman, illustrated by Orion Zangara
- Yes Trespassing (2017), by Erik T. Johnson
- Liars, Fakers, and the Dead Who Eat Them (2017), by Scott Edelman, introduction by Brian Keene, illustrated by Daniele Serra
- Artifacts (2018), by Darren Speegle, introduction by Gene O'Neill, illustrated by L.A. Spooner
- Off Season 35th Anniversary Edition by Jack Ketchum (2018), illustrated by Tomislav Tikulin
- Bird Box Special Edition (2019) by Josh Malerman, illustrated by Glenn Chadbourne
- Arkadium Rising (2019) by Glen Krisch
- Murmur (2020) by Patrick Freivald
- Dear Thomas (2023) by Danyelle Cedar
- Not a Speck of Light (2024) by Laird Barron
- Long Division: Stories of Social Decay, Societal Collapse, and Bad Manners (2024) edited by Doug Murano and Michael Bailey

Note: All Written Backwards books are also designed by Michael Bailey, including original artwork.
