= The Big Blow =

The Big Blow may refer to:

== Arts, entertainment, and literature ==
- The Big Blow (Lansdale novel), a 2000 novel by Joe R. Lansdale based on his earlier short story
- The Big Blow (Pratt novel), a 1936 novel by Theodore Pratt
- The Big Blow (play), a 1938 Broadway play by Theodore Pratt based on his novel
- "The Big Blow", a short story by Joe R. Lansdale published in Sanctified and Chicken Fried
- "The Big Blow", a 1983 episode of Magnum, P.I.

== Weather events ==
- The Big Blow, a nickname for the 1880 storm that sunk the PS Alpena
- The Big Blow, a nickname for the Great Lakes Storm of 1913
- The Big Blow, a nickname for the Great Olympic Blowdown of 1921
- The Big Blow, a nickname for the Columbus Day storm of 1962

== See also ==
- "The Big Blow Out" episode of Teenage Mutant Ninja Turtles
- "The Big Blow-Up" episode of Arthur
- "The Big Blow Up" episode of ChalkZone
