= Patrick Freivald =

American horror and thriller author

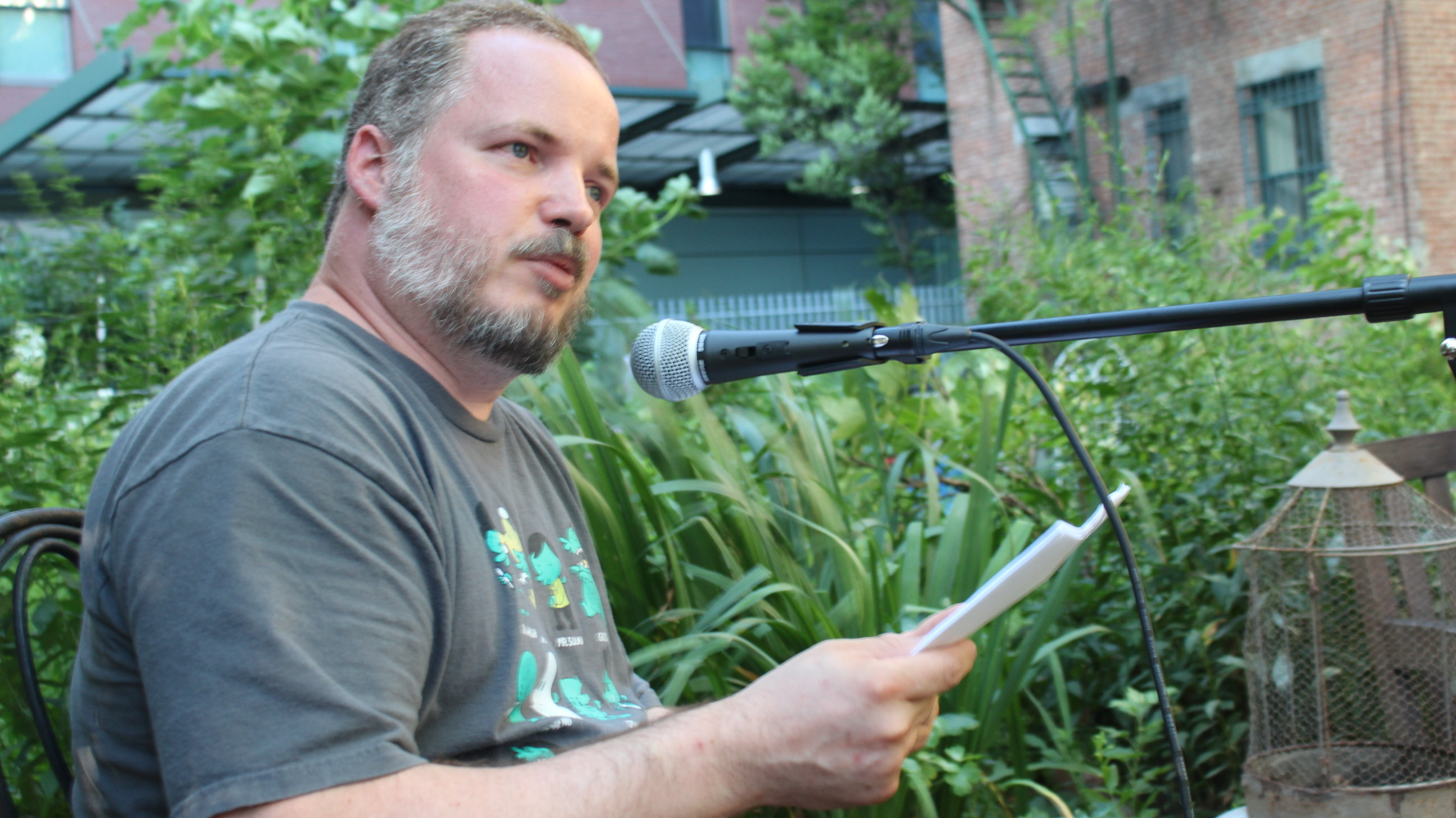
- Freivald in 2019
- Born: October 5, 1976 (age 50); Omaha, Nebraska, U.S.
- Occupations: horror and thriller author, former teacher, bee keeper

Patrick Freivald (born October 5, 1976, in Omaha, Nebraska) is a long-time science teacher and author of nine novels and dozens of short stories spanning science fiction, horror, thrillers, fantasy, young adult, and mid-grade fiction.

== Awards ==
In 2015, the Horror Writers Association awarded him the Richard Laymon President's Award. His novels Black Tide and Jade Sky were finalists for the Bram Stoker Award for Novel (in 2015 and 2014, respectively). "Special Dead" was a finalist for the 2013 Bram Stoker Award for Best Young Adult Novel, and Snapshot, a short story published in the Blood and Roses anthology, published by Scarlett River Press was a finalist for the 2013 Bram Stoker Award for Short Fiction.

== Bibliography ==
=== Novels and graphic novels ===
Patrick Freivald's Ani Romero novel series comprises two novels (Twice Shy and Special Dead) published by Journalstone and one novella (Love Bites) published by Pterotype Digital. Barking Deer Press republished his Matt Rowley series which consists of four novels: Jade Sky and Black Tide (originally published by Journalstone), Jade Gods (originally published by Cohesion Press), and the fourth in the series titled Jade Scars published by Barking Deer Press. "A story based on Jade Sky was ported into graphic format with Joe McKinney and published as a 4-part series in Dark Discoveries magazine (2014-2015). He co-wrote the novel Blood List (Journalstone, 2013) with his twin brother Philip Freivald.

== Collection of short fiction ==
In the Garden of Rusting Gods: A Collection, published 2019, Barking Deer Press

=== Short fiction ===
- Snapshot (in Blood and Roses, Scarlett River Press, 2013) and as an audiobook (in Tales to Terrify, No. 120, District of Wonders, 2014)
- The Red Man (in Deathlehem Revisited, Grinning Skull Press, 2013)
- A Taste for Life (in Demonic Visions: 50 Horror Tales, Book 1, 2014)
- Outside (in Demonic Visions: 50 Horror Tales, Book 2, 2013)
- Fall (in Demonic Visions: 50 Horror Tales, Book 3, 2013)
- Trigger Warning (in Demonic Visions: 50 Horror Tales, Book 4, 2014)
- Twelve Kilos (in Qualia Nous, Written Backwards, 2014)
- Forward Base Fourteen (in Never Fear, 13Thirty Books, 2015)
- Taps (in Never Fear, 13Thirty Books, 2015)
- Bonked (in SNAFU: Hunters, Cohesion Press, 2016)
- Splinter (in SQ Mag, Edition 27, IFWG Publishing, 2016)
- The Star (in The Tarot, 13Thirty Books, 2016)
- Control (in Uncharted Worlds: Xeno Encounters, 13Thirty Books, 2016)
- Shorted (in Never Fear The Apocalypse, 13Thirty Books, 2017)
- Roadkill (in Double Barrel Horror Volume 2, Pint Bottle Press, 2017)
- The Gateway (in Double Barrel Horror Volume 2, Pint Bottle Press, 2017)
- Earl Pruitt's Smoker (in Behold! Oddities, Curiosities, and Undefinable Wonders, Crystal Lake Publishing, 2017)
- The Chosen Place (in A New York State of Fright, Hippocampus Press, 2018)
- Conditioning (in SNAFU: Last Stand, Cohesion Press, 2019)
- Field Trip (in Under Twin Suns: Alternate Histories of the Yellow Sign, Hippocampus Press, 2021)
- A Better Hate (in Blood Bank, Blood Bound Books, 2022)
- Manifold Thoughts (in Arithmophobia, Polymath Press, 2023)
- Well Worn (in SVP's Little Black Book of Terror, Laughing Black Vampire Productions, LLC, 2023)
- The Song of Fools (in Qualia Nous vol. 2, Written Backwards Press, 2023)
- Where the Silent Ones Smile (in Where the Silent Ones Watch, Hippocampus Press, 2024)

== Other ==
- In 2016, he chaired the Horror Writers Association's Bram Stoker Award for Lifetime Achievement jury.
- He is a member of the Horror Writers Association and the International Thriller Writers association.
- He was an instructor at the StokerCon Horror University, 2016-2019.
- He is President Emeritus of the Ontario Finger Lakes Beekeepers Association.
- He teaches high school classes in Physics, Robotics, and American Sign Language; and he taught Physics at Rochester Institute of Technology and ASL at Genesee Community College.
- He has served as a coach to the FIRST Robotics Competition Team 1551, The Grapes of Wrath, since 2005.

== Charlie Kirk comments ==
Freivald was placed on leave at his function as a teacher at Naples Central School District in Upstate New York following community controversy stemming from comments he made on social media following the death of Charlie Kirk. He later resigned the position.

== See also ==
- List of horror fiction authors
