= Nebula Awards Showcase 2017 =

Science fiction and fantasy anthology

- Cover of first edition
- Editor: Julie E. Czerneda
- Cover artist: Maurizio Manzieri
- Language: English
- Series: Nebula Awards Showcase
- Genre: Science fiction and fantasy
- Publisher: Pyr
- Publication date: 2017
- Publication place: United States
- Media type: Print (paperback)
- Pages: 335
- ISBN: 978-1-63388-271-3
- OCLC: 957503760
- Preceded by: Nebula Awards Showcase 2016
- Followed by: Nebula Awards Showcase 2018

Nebula Awards Showcase 2017 is an anthology of science fiction and fantasy short works edited by Canadian writer Julie E. Czerneda. It was first published in trade paperback and ebook by Pyr in May 2017.

== Summary ==
The book collects pieces that won or were nominated for the Nebula Awards for best novel, novella, novelette and short story for the year 2015 (presented in 2016), as well as the novel that won the Andre Norton Award for that year, a tribute to 2016 grand master winner C. J. Cherryh and excerpts from representative early novels by her, nonfiction pieces related to the awards, and the three Rhysling Award and Dwarf Stars Award-winning poems for 2015, together with an introduction by the editor. The novels are represented by excerpts; the non-winning pieces nominated for the Andre Norton Award, Best Novella and for Best Novelette are omitted.

== Contents ==
- "Introduction" (Julie E. Czerneda)
- "About the Science Fiction and Fantasy Writers of America"
- "Kevin O'Donnell Jr. Service to SFWA Award Recipient: Lawrence M. Schoen"
- "About the Nebula Awards"
- "2015 Nebula Awards Ballot"
- "Madeleine" [Best short story nominee, 2016] (Amal El-Mohtar)
- "Cat Pictures Please" [Best short story nominee, 2016] (Naomi Kritzer)
- "Damage" [Best short story nominee, 2016] (David D. Levine)
- "When Your Child Strays from God" [Best short story nominee, 2016] (Sam J. Miller)
- "Today I Am Paul" [Best short story nominee, 2016] (Martin L. Shoemaker)
- "Hungry Daughters of Starving Mothers" [Best short story winner, 2016] (Alyssa Wong)
- "About the Rhysling and Dwarf Stars Awards"
- "Shutdown" [Rhysling Award winner for short poem, 2015] (Marge Simon)
- "abandoned nursing home" [Dwarf Stars Award winner, 2015] (Greg Schwartz)
- "Our Lady of the Open Road" [Best novelette winner, 2016] (Sarah Pinsker)
- "Binti" [Best novella winner, 2016] (Nnedi Okorafor)
- "Excerpt from Raising Caine" [Best novel nominee, 2016] (Charles E. Gannon)
- "Excerpt from The Fifth Season" [Best novel nominee, 2016] (N. K. Jemisin)
- "Excerpt from Ancillary Mercy [Best novel nominee, 2016] (Ann Leckie)
- "Excerpt from The Grace of Kings [Best novel nominee, 2016] (Ken Liu)
- "Excerpt from Barsk: The Elephant's Graveyard [Best novel nominee, 2016] (Lawrence M. Schoen)
- "Excerpt from Uprooted [Best novel winner, 2016] (Naomi Novik)
- "100 Reasons to Have Sex with an Alien" [Rhysling Award winner for long poem, 2015] (F. J. Bergmann)
- "About the Ray Bradbury Award"
- "A Remarkable Win" [essay on Ray Bradbury Award winner Mad Max: Fury Road] (Mark Askwith)
- "About the Andre Norton Award"
- "Excerpt from Updraft" [Andre Norton Award winner] (Fran Wilde)
- "About the Kate Wilhelm Solstice Award"
- "I Have Read Them All, Now" [tribute to Kate Wilhelm Award winner Sir Terry Pratchett] (Michelle Sagara)
- "About the Damon Knight Memorial Grand Master Award"
- "Damon Knight Grand Master: C. J. Cherryh" [tribute] (Betsy Wollheim)
- "Excerpt from Pride of Chanur" (C. J. Cherryh)
- "Excerpt from Foreigner' (C. J. Cherryh)
- "Past Nebula Award Winners"
- "About the Editor"
- "About the Cover Artist"

== Reception ==
Publishers Weekly states that "Czerneda has curated a sterling collection of outstanding work" and called the anthology "indispensable reading for anyone interested in fantastic fiction," with "[t]he three short-fiction winners show[ing] the breadth of themes and ideas and the sheer creativity of the genre’s leading writers."

Samantha Holloway in the New York Journal of Books calls "this year's collection ... a very good example of the breadth and depth of current scifi and fantasy. As it should be, being the best of the best nominated for the awards." She discusses most of the pieces favorably, summing up with "[t]he characters and cultures depicted are also wonderfully diverse, and that's still a new enough thing to see that it's exciting and fresh." Noting that "[m]ost of this collection comes from women," she take the fact as a signal "that the boy's club idea of scifi and fantasy may finally have cracked." She concludes "[i]f this book doesn't make a reader want to go find the full novels and collections these stories and excerpts come from, maybe speculative fiction isn't for them, because this year's collection is top notch and compulsively readable."

Kristi Chadwick in the Library Journal writes "[t]his collection will speak to anyone who has a passion for diverse, imaginative speculative fiction" and "the tales showcased here push the boundaries of sexuality, diversity, and genre, reflecting the ability of sf/fantasy always to surprise and reward."

Glenn Dallas in the San Francisco Book Review describes the series "hard to top" as "a home for outstanding short stories that show the incredible inventiveness that typifies science fiction," with the current volume representing "one of the more accessible years for Nebula nominees," as it "skewed more toward the emotional than the dry and scientific. ... [T]his is the breadth and depth of speculative fiction writ large: the crossroads of imagination, heart, and insight." He rates the book 4 stars out of 5.
