= The Infected =

- Genres: Punk rock, Melodic hardcore, Post-punk
- Years active: 1993–2003 / 2006–2015
- Labels: Brotherhood of the Snake, 40 Amp, Eugene Records, & Shit Starter Records

The Infected (or simply, Infected) is one of the longest standing punk rock bands from Lexington, Kentucky, formed in 1993 and having released twelve albums and EPs. The band, signed on the Eugene Records label, went through many iterations, before going on hiatus in 2003 and returning in 2006 as "hometown heroes".

== History ==
Infected or The Infected were formed by Nathan Waters a.k.a. Nasty Nate, Robert Gunning and Brandon Faukner in 1993. This was the lineup for the limited release of All the Shit You Hate, recorded in 1994 and 1995.

"Buff" Mike Nagiec joined to play bass in 1995, and Sean Degan joined as second guitarist later on. Faukner left in late 1996, citing creative differences, and Degan was pressed into drumming. This lineup released the band's first full-length studio LP, New Defiance and the notable "Alano" show, bootlegs of which are one of the few known live recordings of this version of the band.

Kevin Davis, former member of several local punk bands, notably Blatherskyte with Nathan Waters, replaced Degan on drums in 1996. A few weeks later, Andrew "Andy-Boy" Hibpshman joined as second guitarist, but moved to bass when Naigec decided to quit the band. This lineup lasted a year.

Gunning left the band in 1997, and the band was searching for a replacement guitarist for some time. Mark Borders, originally a member of the seminal Berea, Kentucky hardcore punk band Deep 13 eventually joined to play guitar, and the most stable lineup of the band, lasting from 1997 to 2000, was complete. The cassette EP Progress in the Downtime, the full-length album Tolerance for Failure, the Floormodeled EP, a split 7" record with local band Redheaded Stepchildren and the second installment of All the Shit You Hate were all produced during this time, along with the band's first cross-country tours and many regional performances.

Kevin Davis was replaced in 2000 and a series of drummers followed. Edgar Purdom was the longest-lasting of these, filling the role for a little under a year. He left, however, to join label mates The Brassknuckle Boys. Rocky Borders, of Redheaded Stepchildren and Mark's brother, eventually joined as drummer. This was the longest-lasting lineup for the Infected, producing the unreleased studio album All-Time Low and the "I5" single, as the band disbanded in 2003.

In September 2006, the Infected played a reunion concert in order to promote the CD Tales of the Tortured Mind, a retrospective of material from 1996 to 2003. This release was pressed specifically to fund the release of All Time Low, which has been in hiatus due to lack of funding for three years. A second show was played on September 30, 2006, also to fund the release of All Time Low. The first show featured the drummer from the Lexington-based rock and roll band HEARTTHROB, while the second has Rocky Borders returning to the lineup. Rocky Borders played his last show with the band on June 16, 2007, with Edgar Purdom rejoining the band a little more than a month later. The Infected recorded a three-song demo directly after Purdom joined the band. However, this line up only lasted for 4 months, with the group deciding to let him go. In 2007, Kelly Patrick Cammack was hired to play drums.

In May 2008 Infected parted ways once again, only for Nate to regroup with an all new line up in July 2008. Kevin Davis returned to play drums, along with original guitarist Robert Gunning and long time friend of the band, Mike "Beans" McCarter on bass. Mark Borders went on to play guitar for Green Jellÿ. Mike "Beans" McCarter eventually left the band in 2011 after falling out with other members.

Since then Infected has fine tuned their lineup, before settling with their current group, which includes the additions of Kevin Mutz on drums, Eric Nickel on Bass, and Chris Reeves as the lead guitarist. As of 2012 Infected continue to tour the U.S., with recent summer tour dates added to the bands web page https://www.infectedrockshop.com

In Jan 2013 long time off and on Infected drummer Kevin Davis returned to the band on second guitar replacing Kris Anglin. Infected also completed a new full length set to be out in March 2013, as well as more tour dates to be announced any day.

Nate Waters died June 11, 2026.

The Infected personnel
(1994–1995)	Nathan Waters - vocals, bass; Robert Gunning - guitar; Brandon Faukner - drums
(1995–1996)	Nathan Waters - vocals; "Buff" Mike Nagiec - bass; Robert Gunning - guitar; Brandon Faukner - drums
(1996)	Nathan Waters - vocals; 'Buff' Mike Nagiec - bass; Robert Gunning - guitar; Sean Degan - drums
(1996)	Nathan Waters - vocals; 'Buff' Mike Nagiec - bass; Robert Gunning - guitar; Kevin "Fife" Davis - drums
(1996–1997)	Nathan Waters - vocals; Andrew "Andy-Boy" Hibpshman - bass; Robert Gunning - guitar; Kevin "Fife" Davis - drums
(1997)	Nathan Waters - vocals and guitar; Andrew "Andy-Boy" Hibpshman - bass; Kevin "Fife" Davis - drums
(1997–2000)	Nathan Waters - vocals; Andrew "Andy-Boy" Hibpshman - bass; Mark Borders - guitar; Kevin "Fife" Davis - drums
(2000)	Nathan Waters - vocals; Andrew "Andy-Boy" Hibpshman - bass; Mark Borders - guitar; Edgar Purdom - drums
(2000–2007)	Nathan Waters - vocals; Andrew "Andy-Boy" Hibpshman - bass; Mark Borders - guitar; Rocky Borders - drums
(2007)	Nathan Waters - vocals; Andrew "Andy-Boy" Hibpshman - bass; Mark Borders - guitar; Edgar Purdom - drums
(2008)	Nathan Waters - vocals; Andrew "Andy-Boy" Hibpshman - bass; Mark Borders - guitar; Kelly Pat (Rick) Cammack - drums
(2008–2009)	Nathan Waters - vocals; Mike "Beans" Mc Arter - bass; Kris Anglin - guitar; Jackson Hogg - guitar; K Davis - drums
(2009–2011)	Nathan Waters - vocals; Mike "Beans" Mc Arter - bass; Kris Anglin - guitar; Matt Sigler - guitar; K Davis - drums
(2011–present)	Nathan Waters - vocals; Eric Nickell - bass; Kris Anglin - guitar; Chris Reeves - guitar; Kevin Mutz - drums

== Related bands ==
The Infected shared many members with other Lexington, Kentucky punk and hardcore bands, most notably the Redheaded Stepchildren (Rocky Borders) and Deep 13 (Mark Borders and Andrew (Andyboy) Hibpshman). Kevin Davis was in the band Blatherskyte with Nathan Waters. Side projects were also very widespread, such as Bitchkiller, featuring Andrew Hibpshman with several ex-members of local grindcore band Ungrateful, and Kane (also known as Cane), which was a humorous hardcore band along the lines of Anal Cunt and Spazz, featuring the members of the Infected and Deep 13 playing instruments that they did not play in their normal band (with the exception of Mark, who played drums in Deep 13 at the time, and Tom Spalding of Deep 13, who played bass in both bands). Both of these bands were relatively short lived, however. The most significant side project was Squall Line. It also featured members of other local bands and former and present Infected members. Andyboy was also in Kill Toby Wyatt which featured members from Deep 13 and The Parlor Boys and is now playing drums with local stoner rockers Stampede and playing guitar in Hateshrines with former Infected and Deep 13 bandmate Mark Borders. Andy has now started a stoner/emo band called Horned Owl as well. Mark Borders has been running sound for bands such as Nashville Pussy, Motörhead, The Black Dahlia Murder, and various others, as well as playing guitar with Green Jellÿ and Dwarves.

== Discography ==
Studio albums

- New Defiance - 1996 (Independent release)
- Progress in the Downtime - 1997 (Independent release)
- Tolerance for Failure - 1998 (Eugene Records)
- All Time Low - 2003 (Eugene Records, officially unreleased)
- Tales of the Tortured Mind - 2006 (Eugene Records)
- It's Been A Long Way Down - 2013 (Shit Starter Records/Toxic Pop Records)

EPs and 7"s

- All the Shit you Hate! - 1995 (10-Gallon Records)
- Infected/Redheaded Stepchildren Split 7" - 1997 (Eugene Records)
- Floormodeled E.P. - 1999 (Eugene Records)
- All the Shit you Hate Vol. 2 E.P. - 2000 (Eugene Records)
- I-5 E.P. - 2003 (Eugene Records)
- Insomnia, E.P. - 2007 (Eugene Records)
- Awake In Our Own Graves, 7" E.P. - 2009 (A.D.D. Records)

Compilations

- Fall Asleep to This, with the song "Format" - 1997 (Smart Ass Records)
- Eugene Records Compilation '06, with songs "Lawington" and "I-5 (the Norbetta Song)" 2006 (Eugene Records)
