= Usman T. Malik =

Pakistani speculative fiction author

- عثمان تنویر ملک
- Born: Pakistan
- Occupation: Writer
- Writing career
- Language: English
- Years active: 2003-present
- Genres: Fantasy; Horror
- Notable works: "The Vaporization Enthalpy of a Peculiar Pakistani Family"; "The Pauper Prince and the Eucalyptus Jinn"
- Notable awards: Bram Stoker Award for Short Fiction (2014); British Fantasy Award (2016)
- Website: www.usmanmalik.org

Usman T. Malik is a Pakistani speculative fiction author. His short fiction has been published in magazines and books such as The Apex Book of World SF, Nightmare, Strange Horizons, Black Static, and in a number of "year's best" anthologies. He is the first Pakistani to win the Bram Stoker Award for Short Fiction (2014) and has won the British Fantasy Award (2016). He has been nominated for the World Fantasy Award (2016), nominated again for the Stoker Award (2018), has twice been a finalist for the Nebula Award, and has been nominated for multiple Locus Awards.

== Biography ==
Malik was born in Pakistan. His story, "The Crimson Storm", was published in Thirteen Stories #10 in 2003. The following year, "The Well That Never Ended" was published in Deep Magic #23. He had two stories published in The Crimson Pact series edited by Paul Genesse: "A Demon in the Mughal Court" in volume four (2012) and "Hearts in Reverse" in volume five (2013). "Pinned and Wriggling on the Wall" was published on the Daily Science Fiction site in June 2013.

That same year, he attended the Clarion West Writers Workshop. In 2014, Malik became the first Pakistani to win the Bram Stoker Award for Short Fiction with his story "The Vaporization Enthalpy of a Peculiar Pakistani Family." That story was also nominated for the Nebula and Locus Awards. In conjunction with Desi Writers Lounge, he led Pakistan's first speculative fiction writing workshop in Lahore in 2014, which featured Musharraf Ali Farooqi as a guest speaker.

His story, "The Pauper Prince and the Eucalyptus Jinn", won the British Fantasy Award for best novella in 2016. The story was also nominated for the Locus, Nebula, and World Fantasy Awards. The next year, "In the Ruins of Mohenjo-Daro" was nominated for a Locus Award. "The Fortune of Sparrows", published in February 2017 in Black Feathers: Dark Avian Tales edited by Ellen Datlow, was nominated for a Locus Award. Malik was nominated for a Stoker Award for "Dead Lovers on Each Blade, Hung", published in Nightmare Magazine in 2018.

His short fiction has been published in magazines and books such as The Apex Book of World SF, Nightmare Magazine, Strange Horizons, Black Static, and Tor.com. His stories have also been reprinted in a number of "year's best" anthologies including The Year's Best Dark Fantasy and Horror, The Years Best YA Speculative Fiction, The Best Science Fiction and Fantasy of the Year, and the Year’s Best Weird Fiction.

His first collection, Midnight Doorways: Fables from Pakistan, was published in 2021 by Kitab. It won the 2022 Crawford Award.

=== Personal life ===
Malik's interests include Sufi poetry and playing the guitar. He currently works in the healthcare industry.

== Bibliography ==
=== Collections ===
- Midnight Doorways: Fables from Pakistan (2021, Kitab, ISBN 978-9696-16058-8)
  - Contains the following stories: "Ishq", "The Wandering City", "Resurrection Points", "The Fortune of Sparrows", "Dead Lovers on Each Blade, Hung", "The Vaporization Enthalpy of a Peculiar Pakistani Family", and "In the Ruins of Mohenjo-Daro".

=== Short works ===
- "The Crimson Storm" in Thirteen Stories #10, edited by Jennifer M. Brooks (June 2003, Nocturna Digital Press)
- "The Well That Never Ended" in Deep Magic #23, edited by Jeremy Whitted (April 2004, Amberlin)
- "A Demon in the Mughal Court" in The Crimson Pact, Volume 4, edited by Paul Genesse (September 2012, Alliteration Ink, ISBN 978-0-9858254-6-1)
- "Pinned and Wriggling on the Wall" in Daily Science Fiction, edited by Michele Barasso and Jonathan Laden (June 2013)
- "Hearts in Reverse" in The Crimson Pact, Volume 5, edited by Paul Genesse (2013, Iron Dragon Books, ISBN 978-0-9850038-4-5)
- "Blood Women" in Chiral Mad 2, edited by Michael Bailey (December 2013, Written Backwards, ISBN 978-1-4942-3997-8)
- "Resurrection Points" in Strange Horizons, edited by Niall Harrison (August 2014)
- "The Vaporization Enthalpy of a Peculiar Pakistani Family" in Qualia Nous, edited by Michael Bailey (2014, Written Backwards, ISBN 978-0-578-14646-1)
- "Laal Andhi" in Truth or Dare?, edited by Max Booth III (2014, Perpetual Motion Machine Publishing, ISBN 978-0-9860594-5-2)
- "Ishq" in Black Static #43, edited by Andy Cox (November/December 2014, TTA Press)
- "The Pauper Prince and the Eucalyptus Jinn" in Tor.com, edited by Ellen Datlow (April 2015)
- "The Last Manuscript" in Gamut, edited by Richard Thomas (November 2017, Gamut Magazine)
- "In the Ruins of Mohenjo-Daro" in The Mammoth Book of Cthulhu: New Lovecraftian Fiction, edited by Paula Guran (April 2016, Robinson, ISBN 978-1-4721-2003-8)
- "The Fortune of Sparrows" in Black Feathers: Dark Avian Tales, edited by Ellen Datlow (February 2017, Pegasus Books, ISBN 978-1-68177-321-6)
- "Emperors of Jinn" in The Djinn Falls in Love & Other Stories, edited by Mahvesh Murad and Jared Shurin (March 2017, Solaris Books, ISBN 978-1-78108-416-8)
- "Dead Lovers on Each Blade, Hung" in Nightmare Magazine, edited by John Joseph Adams (November 2018); The Best American Science Fiction and Fantasy 2019, edited by Carmen Maria Machado and John Joseph Adams (October 2019, Mariner Books, ISBN 9781328604378)
- "Folie à Deux, or the Ticking Hourglass" in Final Cuts: New Tales of Hollywood Horror and Other Spectacles, edited by Ellen Datlow (June 2020, Anchor Books, ISBN 978-0-525-56575-8)
- "The Wandering City" in Us in Flux, part of the Center for Science and the Imagination at Arizona State University (July 2020)
- "City of Red Midnight: A Hikayat" in Tor.com (October 2020)
- "#Spring Love, #Pichal Pairi in Tor.com (March 2021)

=== Poetry ===
- "Blood Blues" in Space and Time #122, edited by Hildy Silverman (Fall/Winter 2014)

== Awards and recognition ==
Year	Award	Category	Work	Result	Ref.
2014	Bram Stoker Awards	Short Fiction	"The Vaporization Enthalpy of a Peculiar Pakistani Family"	Won	
2015	Locus Award	Best Short Story	"The Vaporization Enthalpy of a Peculiar Pakistani Family"	11th place	
2015	Nebula Award	Best Short Story	"The Vaporization Enthalpy of a Peculiar Pakistani Family"	Nominated	
2016	British Fantasy Award	Best Novella	"The Pauper Prince and the Eucalyptus Jinn"	Won	
2016	Locus Awards	Best Novella	"The Pauper Prince and the Eucalyptus Jinn"	6th place	
2016	Nebula Awards	Best Novella	"The Pauper Prince and the Eucalyptus Jinn"	Nominated	
2016	World Fantasy Award	Best Novella	"The Pauper Prince and the Eucalyptus Jinn"	Nominated	
2017	Locus Awards	Best Novelette	"In the Ruins of Mohenjo-Daro"	21th place	
2018	Bram Stoker Awards	Best Long Fiction	"Dead Lovers on Each Blade, Hung"	Nominated	
2018	Locus Awards	Best Short Story	"The Fortune of Sparrows"	31th place	
2021	Eugie Foster Memorial Award for Short Fiction		City of Red Midnight: A Hikayat	Nominated	
2021	Locus Awards	Best Novelette	City of Red Midnight: A Hikayat	10th place	
2021	Locus Awards	Best Novelette	Folie à Deux, or the Ticking Hourglass	3th place	
2021	Locus Awards	Best Short Story	"The Wandering City"	27th place	
2022	World Fantasy Awards	Best Collection	Midnight Doorways: Fables from Pakistan	Won	
2022	Locus Awards	Best Collection	Midnight Doorways: Fables from Pakistan	4th place	
2022	Ignyte Awards	Outstanding Anthology/Collected Works	Midnight Doorways: Fables from Pakistan	Finalist	
2022	Crawford Award	—	Midnight Doorways: Fables from Pakistan	Won	
2022	World Fantasy Awards	Best Short Fiction	"#Spring Love, #Pichal Pairi"	Nominated	
2022	Locus Awards	Best Short Story	"#Spring Love, #Pichal Pairi"	32nd place	
2023	Shirley Jackson Awards	Best Novella	Challawa	Nominated	
