= Benjamin Kane Ethridge =

American author

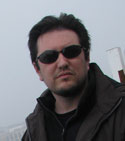
- Born: Benjamin Kane Ethridge; January 16, 1977; Riverside, California, U.S.
- Education: University of California, Riverside (BA); California State University, San Bernardino (MA)
- Occupation: Novelist
- Website: bkebooks.com

Benjamin Kane Ethridge (born January 16, 1977) is an American author who writes in the horror and dark fantasy genres.

Ethridge was born in Riverside, California. He spent the first five years of his life living in Alaska and Texas, before returning to Southern California. Currently, Ethridge lives in Jupiter, Florida. He obtained a BA in English at University of California, Riverside and an MA in English composition at California State University, San Bernardino. In 2003, after a stint of substitute teaching, Ethridge joined an environmental compliance firm, where he worked as an inspector.

In 2006, Ethridge began publishing short fantasy and horror fiction in his spare time. In October 2010, his first novel, Black & Orange, was published by Bad Moon Books and later won a Bram Stoker Award for Superior Achievement in First Novel. In 2012, his second work, Bottled Abyss, was also nominated for the Bram Stoker Award in the novel category, and the following year his novella The Slaughter Man, from the shared world anthology Limbus, Inc., earned a Bram Stoker nomination in the Long Fiction category.

== Nominations ==
- Bram Stoker Award for Superior Achievement in a First Novel – Black & Orange (2010)
- Bram Stoker Award for Superior Achievement in a Novel – Bottled Abyss (2012)
- Bram Stoker Award for Superior Achievement in Long Fiction – The Slaughter Man (2013)

== Awards ==
- Honorable Mention – L. Ron Hubbard Writers of the Future contest (2008)
- Doorways magazine slasher contest winner
- Bram Stoker Award for Superior Achievement in a First Novel – Black & Orange (2010)

== Bibliography ==
=== Novels ===
- Black & Orange (Bad Moon Books, 2010)
- Bottled Abyss (Redrum Horror, 2012/Horrific Tales Publishing, 2015)
- Dungeon Brain (Nightscape Press, 2012)
- Nightmare Ballad (JournalStone Books, 2013)
- Nomads (Black & Orange II) (Bad Moon Books, 2013)
- Divine Scream (JournalStone Books, 2015)
- The Slaughter Man: Moon City Tale (JournalStone Books, 2016)

=== Novellas ===
- The Slaughter Man, appearing in Limbus, Inc. (JournalStone, 2013)
- The Cats of Delkilth, appearing in Reaping October (Evil Jester Press, 2013)
- Locked Room Misery, co-written with Mark Allan Gunnells (Gallows Press, 2014)
- This House... (Samhain Books, 2016)

=== Collections ===
- Reaping October: Stories from the Black & Orange Universe (Evil Jester Press, 2013)

=== Short stories ===
Dates by original magazine or anthology publication.

- "Error" (2006) – Aoife's Kiss
- "Cactus and the Tutubaloo Franchise" (2006) – Worlds of Wonder
- "Copse of Elms" (2007) – Nth Degree
- "Chortle" (2007) – Dark Recesses
- "The Fall of Lightninghead" (2008) – Sinister Tales
- "Gorgon" (2008) – Doorways Magazine
- "Surgeon Delta" (2009) – FearZone
- "Chester" (2010) – Dark Recesses
- "From the Bowels" (2011) – Ante Mortem
- "The Piece Cast Down" (2011) – Mezzotints blog: Queen Anne's Resurrection - Journey IV - The Sea and the Ghost Islands
- "Doors Too Silver" (2011) – Fluidity of Time blog
- "Solution" (2012) – Horror For Good: A Charitable Anthology (Volume 1)
- "Running Through the Shadow" (2012) – I Will Rise - Dark Fuse Special Edition
- "The Bridge Across" (2012) – Dark Discoveries No. 21
- "Blackened White" (2012) – Il Boia Scarlatto: Mezzotints
- "The Death of E-Coli" (2013) – After Death
- "The Z-Spot" (2013) – 50 Shades of Decay
- "All the Sludge" (2013) – Bleed
- "Deviant Colors" (2013) – Nightscapes: Volume 1
- "Data Suck" (2013) – Blood Type: An Anthology of Vampire SF on the Cutting Edge
- "All Other Days" (2013) – Reaping October
- "Child Care" (2013) – Reaping October
- "The Vulture's Art" (2013) – Horror Library, Volume 5
- "The 'Corn Factory" (2014) – October Dreams 2
- "Creation" (2023) – Tales From the Clergy

=== Editor ===
- Madhouse – co-editing stories and main story writing with Brad C. Hodson (Dark Regions, 2016)
