= Annie Neugebauer =

Poet and horror writer

- Education: University of Texas

Annie Neugebauer is a Texas based contemporary author of horror and poetry. Educated at the University of Texas at Austin, Neugebauer has been the webmaster for the Poetry Society of Texas. She has been nominated for the Bram Stoker Award twice. Her work has been published in a wide number of magazines including such names as Apex Magazine and Black Static. Neugebauer has also had her work appear in anthologies like the Year’s Best Hardcore Horror Volumes 3 & 4. She's a member of the Horror Writers Association.

== Bibliography ==
=== Anthologies ===
- Daunting Deviations: Digital Horror Fiction Anthology. Digital Horror Fiction Short Stories Series One. Digital Fiction Publishing Corporation. 2017. ISBN 978-1-927598-98-6.
- Year's Best Hardcore Horror. Year's Best Hardcore Horror. Red Room Press. 2019. ISBN 978-1-936964-12-3.
- Dark Hallows II: Tales from the Witching Hour. Dark Hallows. CreateSpace Independent Publishing Platform. 2016. ISBN 978-1-5376-3924-6.
- The Shadow Booth: Vol. 3. The Shadow Booth Series. Independently Published. 2019. ISBN 978-1-70542-803-0.

=== Short fiction ===
- Cilantro (2010)
- Jack and the Bad Man (2011)
- The Book Sniffers (2011)
- A Quiet Night, a Perfect End (2012)
- The Call of the House of Usher (2012)
- Hide (2014)
- Pièce de Résistance (2015)
- Zanders the Magnificent (2015)
- Honey (2015)
- The Cottage of Curiosities (2016)
- Vestige (2016)
- The Devil Take the Hindmost (2016)
- Death's Favorite Pet (2017)
- The Lighthouse (2017)
- So Sings the Siren (2017)
- That Which Never Comes (2017)
- Dealing in Shadows (2018)
- Glove Box (2018)
- What Throat (2019)
- She Sleeps (2019)

=== Poems ===
- The Secret in the Village of Dragonsbreath (2011)
- The Centipede (2011)
- I am running (2015)
- Fiend (2015)
- Maxwell's Demon (2016)
- Naked (2016)
- The Shed (2016)
- Unravel (2017)
- Light and Liquor (2018)
- To Write (2019)
