= Sanctified and Chicken Fried =

2009 compilation of short stories by Joe R. Lansdale

Sanctified and Chicken-Fried
- Jacket Design by Lindsay Starr
- Author: Joe R. Lansdale
- Language: English
- Genre: short story collection
- Publisher: University of Texas Press
- Publication date: 2009
- Publication place: United States
- Media type: Print (hardcover)
- Pages: 250
- ISBN: 978-0-292-71941-5
- Preceded by: The Shadows, Kith and Kin (2007)
- Followed by: Unchained and Unhinged (2009)

Sanctified and Chicken-Fried by Joe R. Lansdale is a compilation of short stories told in his inimitable Mojo style of suspense, horror, and humor. Published in 2009 by University of Texas Press, Austin, Texas. The forward is written by Joe’s long-time friend Bill Crider.

The book contains the following stories:

- Mister Weed-Eater
- Tight Little Stitches in a Dead Man’s Back
- The Big Blow
- The Magic Wagon (excerpt)
- Dirt Devils
- The Pit
- Night They Missed the Horror Show
- Bubba Ho-Tep
- The Fat Man and the Elephant
- A Fine Dark Line (excerpt)
- White Mule, Spotted Pig
