= P. D. Cacek =

American author

- Born: Patricia Diana Joy Anne Cacek; December 22, 1951 (age 74); Hollywood, California, U.S.
- Education: California State University, Long Beach (BA)
- Occupation: Writer
- Writing career
- Genre: Horror fiction

Patricia Diana Joy Anne Cacek (December 22, 1951, Hollywood, California) is an American author, mostly of horror novels. She graduated with a Bachelor of Arts in creative writing from California State University, Long Beach in 1975. She has published multiple novels, over one hundred short stories, and written six plays.

In an interview with the Horror Writers Association, Cacek said her secret of horror is to "take reality and give it a twist." Her first story sold when she was "39 ¾", when she was going to stop trying to publish at 40.

== Awards ==
- 1996 – "Metalica" – International Horror Guild Award, Best Short Story (Nomination)
- 1996 – "Metalica" – Bram Stoker Award, Superior Achievement in Short Fiction (Win)
- 1997 – "Dust Motes" – International Horror Guild Award, Best Short Story (Nomination)
- 1998 – Night Prayers – Bram Stoker Award, Superior Achievement in a First Novel (Nomination)
- 1998 – "Leavings" – Bram Stoker Award, Superior Achievement in Long Fiction (Nomination)
- 1998 – Leavings – Bram Stoker Award, Superior Achievement in a Fiction Collection (Nomination)
- 1998 – "Dust Motes" – World Fantasy Award, Best Short Fiction (Win)
- 1999 – "The Grave" – Bram Stoker Award, Superior Achievement in Short Fiction (Nomination)
- 2004 – The Wind Caller – Bram Stoker Award, Novel (Nomination)
- 2006 – "Forced perspective" – International Horror Guild Award, long fiction (Nomination)

== Bibliography ==
=== Novels ===
- The Adventures of Threadwell the Tailor, (1998)
- Night Prayers, Design Image Group (1998)
- Canyons, Tor (2000)
- Night Players (2001)
- The Wind Caller, Leisure (2004)
- Visitation Rites, Diplodocus Press (2013)
- The Selkie, Diplodocus Press (2015)
- Second Lives, Flame Tree Press (2019)
- Second Chances, Flame Tree Press (2020)
- Sebastian, Flame Tree Press (2022)

=== Collections ===
- Leavings, StarsEnd Creations (1997)
- * Eros Interruptus, Diplodocus Press (2005)
- Sympathy for the Dead (2011)

=== Anthologies ===
- Bell, Book & Beyond (1999)
- Now I Lay Me Down to Sleep, with Laura Hickman, (2017)

== See also ==
- List of horror fiction authors
