= Scott Edelman =

American writer and editor (born 1955)

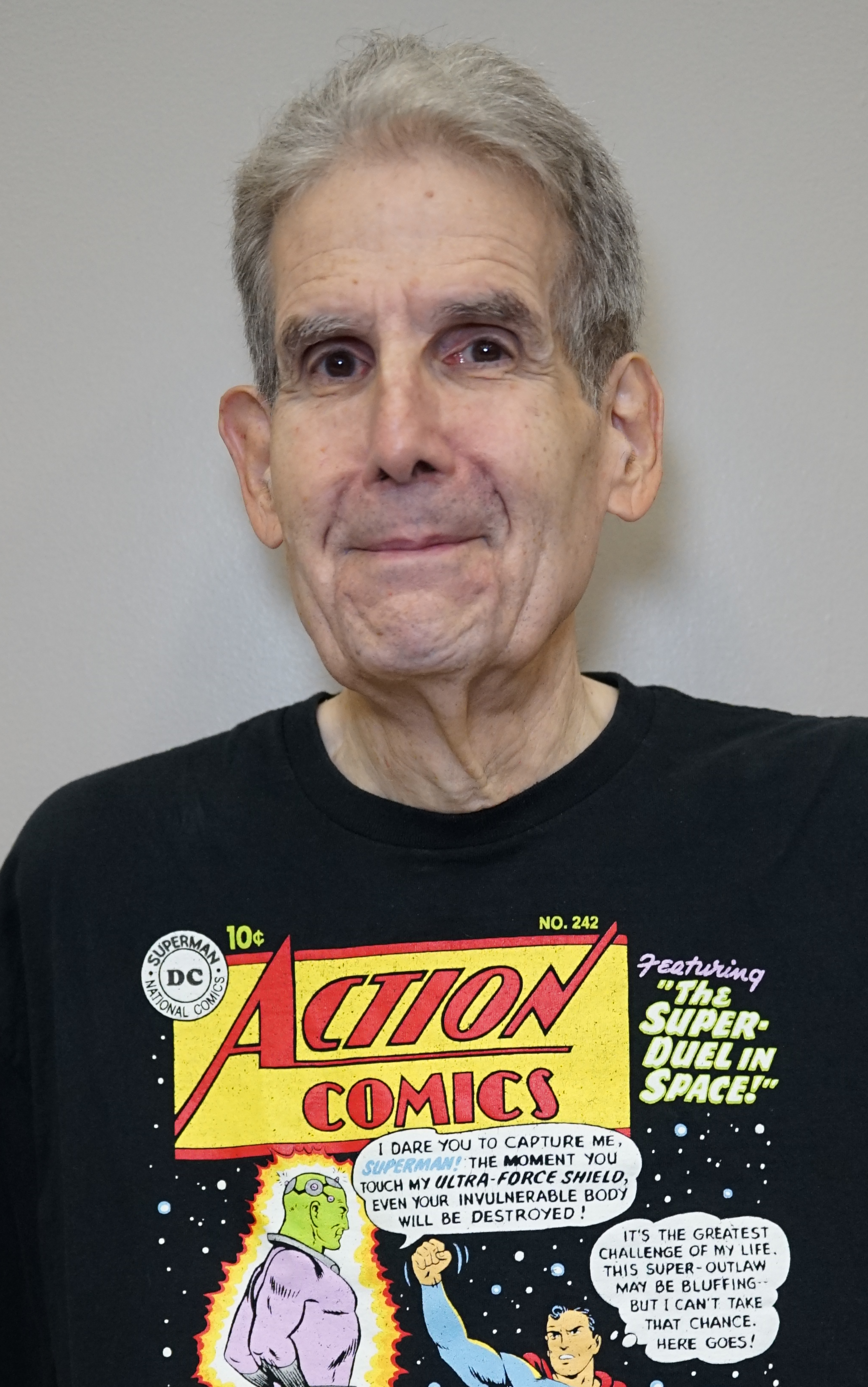
- Scott Edelman at the 2026 Worldcon
- Born: March 31, 1955 (age 71) New York City, US
- Areas: Writer, Editor

Scott Jeffrey Edelman (/ˈɛdəlmən/; born May 31, 1955) is an American science fiction, fantasy, and horror writer and editor.

== Career ==
=== Writer ===
In the 1970s, he worked in American comic books, in particular writing horror comics for both Marvel Comics and DC Comics. For Marvel he created the Scarecrow, and wrote some stories involving Captain America, Captain Marvel, and Omega the Unknown. He edited four issues of Marvel's self-produced fan magazine, FOOM, in the mid-1970s.

Since leaving comics, Edelman has written short stories, beginning "The Last Christmas Tree," in the small-press magazine Night Voyages (Fall 1981), with further work appearing magazines including Analog Science Fiction, Lightspeed, Apex, and Rod Serling's The Twilight Zone, as well as numerous original anthologies. He also wrote one novel, The Gift, nominated for the Lambda Literary Award.

Edelman wrote stories that were included in Eden Studios's zombie anthologies edited by James Lowder.

=== Television ===
Edelman has written for television, including work for Hanna-Barbera, Fantasia for Real (2010), Stephen King's Golden Tales (1985). and several episodes of Tales from the Darkside.

=== Editor ===
He was the founding and only editor of the science fiction magazine Science Fiction Age, which was published by Sovereign Media Co. from 1992 until 2000. He published and edited the semi-professional magazine Last Wave from 1982 to 1985, which was billed as "The Last Best Hope of Speculative Fiction" and published short fiction by Thomas M. Disch, Avram Davidson, and Ian Watson among other established authors. He was the founding editor of Rampage, a magazine covering professional wrestling, and has written unauthorized biographies of wrestlers Chyna and Stone Cold Steve Austin. Other magazines edited by Edelman include Sci-Fi Universe, Sci-Fi Flix, and Satellite Orbit.

In December 1996, while still the editor of Science Fiction Age, Edelman also became editor of Sovereign Media's Sci-Fi Entertainment, the official print magazine of the Sci-Fi Channel. He left Sovereign Media, and his role at Sci-Fi Entertainment (by then renamed SCI FI magazine), in June 2000, but returned to be editor of Sci-Fi Channel's online magazine, Science Fiction Weekly, before transferring back to be editor of SCI FI in February 2002.

=== Podcast ===
Edelman currently runs the podcast Eating the Fantastic, a series of conversations with writers, editors, and fans of fantasy, science fiction, and horror.

== Awards ==
Awards for Scott Edelman
Year	Title	Award	Result	Ref.
1991	The Gift	Lambda Literary Award for Gay Men's Science Fiction/Fantasy	Finalist	
2007	Almost the Last Story by Almost the Last Man	Bram Stoker Award for Best Long Fiction	Finalist	
2009	The Hunger of Empty Vessels	Bram Stoker Award for Best Long Fiction	Finalist	
2010	What Will Come After	Shirley Jackson Award for Single-Author Collection	Finalist	
2015	Becoming Invisible, Becoming Seen	Bram Stoker Award for Best Long Fiction	Finalist	
2016	That Perilous Stuff	Bram Stoker Award for Best Long Fiction	Finalist	
2017	"Faking it Until Forever Comes"	Bram Stoker Award for Best Long Fiction	Finalist	
2026	Eating the Fantastic	Hugo Award for Best Fancast	Pending	

== Publications ==
=== Novels ===
- The Gift (Space & Time Books, 1990)

=== Collections ===
- Suicide Art (Necronomicon Press 1992)
- These Words Are Haunted (Wildside Press 2001)
- What Will Come After (PS Publishing 2010)
- What We Still Talk About (Fantastic Books 2010)
- Liars, Fakers, and the Dead Who Eat Them, illustrated by Daniele Serra (Written Backwards (Allevon #2) 2017)
- Tell Me Like You Done Before and Other Stories Written on the Shoulders of Giants (Lethe Press 2018)
- Things That Never Happened (Cemetery Dance Publications 2020)

=== Novellas ===
- "The Hunger of Empty Vessels" (2009)
- "What Will Come After" (2010)
- "Almost the Last Story by Almost the Last Man" in The Living Dead, edited by John Joseph Adams (2008)

=== Comics ===
- Dead of Night #11 featuring The Scarecrow (1975)
- Marvel Spotlight #26 featuring The Scarecrow (1976)
- Marvel Two-in-One #18 presents The Thing and The Scarecrow (1976)
- Captain Marvel #49 (1977)
- Captain Marvel #50 (1977)
- Captain Marvel #51 (1977)
- Captain Marvel #52 (1977)
- Captain Marvel #53 (1977)
- Captain Marvel #54 (1978)
- Captain Marvel #55 (1978)
- Doorway to Nightmare #5 (1978)
- Marvel Masterworks: Captain Marvel, Vol. 5 (2014)

=== Biographies ===
- Texas Rattlesnake (2000)
- Warrior Queen: The Totally Unauthorized Story of Joanie Laurer (2000)
