= Adam-Troy Castro =

American novelist

- Occupation: Writer
- Writing career
- Genres: Science fiction; fantasy; horror fiction
- Notable awards: Seiun Award (2007); Philip K. Dick Award (2009)
- Website: www.adamtroycastro.com

Adam-Troy Castro is an American science fiction, fantasy, and horror writer living in Wildwood, Florida.

He has almost two hundred stories to his credit and has been nominated for numerous awards, including the Hugo, Nebula, and Stoker. These stories include four Spider-Man novels, including the Sinister Six trilogy, and stories involving characters of Andrea Cort, Ernst Vossoff, and Karl Nimmitz. Castro is also known for his Gustav Gloom series of middle-school novels and has also authored a reference book on The Amazing Race.

== Awards ==
Castro's fiction has been nominated for eight Nebulas, two Hugos, two Seiuns, the World Fantasy Award, and three Stokers. In 2009, he won the Philip K. Dick Award for his novel Emissaries From the Dead.

Awards for Adam-Troy Castro
Work	Year & Award	Category	Result	Ref.
The Last Robot	1993 Locus Award	Short Story	Nominated	
Baby Girl Diamond	1995 Bram Stoker Award	Long Fiction	Nominated	
The Funeral March of the Marionettes	1998 Locus Award	Novella	Nominated	
The Funeral March of the Marionettes	1998 Nebula Award	Novella	Nominated	
The Funeral March of the Marionettes	1998 Hugo Award	Novella	Nominated	
The Astronaut from Wyoming (with Jerry Oltion)	2000 Locus Award	Novella	Nominated	
The Astronaut from Wyoming (with Jerry Oltion)	1999 HOMer Award	Novella	Nominated	
The Astronaut from Wyoming (with Jerry Oltion)	1999 Analog Award	Novella	Won	
The Astronaut from Wyoming (with Jerry Oltion)	2000 Hugo Award	Novella	Nominated	
The Astronaut from Wyoming (with Jerry Oltion)	2000 Nebula Award	Novella	Nominated	
The Astronaut from Wyoming (with Jerry Oltion)	2007 Seiun Award	Translated Short Story	Won	
Sunday Night Yams at Minnie and Earl's	2001 Analog Award	Novella	Won	
Sunday Night Yams at Minnie and Earl's	2002 Locus Award	Novella	Nominated	
Sunday Night Yams at Minnie and Earl's	2003 Nebula Award	Novella	Nominated	
Unseen Demons	2002 Analog Award	Novella	3rd Place	
Unseen Demons	2003 Locus Award	Novella	Nominated	
Of a Sweet Slow Dance in the Wake of Temporary Dogs	2004 Nebula Award	Novelette	Nominated	
The Tangled Strings of the Marionettes	2004 Theodore Sturgeon Award		Finalist	
The Tangled Strings of the Marionettes	2005 Nebula Award	Novella	Nominated	
The Shallow End of the Pool	2008 Bram Stoker Award	Long Fiction	Nominated	
The Shallow End of the Pool	2008 Black Quill Awards	Small Press Chill	Nominated	
Emissaries from the Dead	2008 Philip K. Dick Award		Won	
Emissaries from the Dead	2022 Grand Prix de l'Imaginaire	Foreign Novel	Nominated	
Gunfight on Farside	2009 Analog Award	Novella	3rd Place	
Gunfight on Farside	2010 FantLab's Book of the Year Award	Novella/Short Story	Nominated	
With Unclean Hands	2011 Analog Award	Novella	Won	
With Unclean Hands	2012 Nebula Award	Novella	Nominated	
With Unclean Hands	2013 Seiun Award	Translated Short Story	Nominated	
Hiding Place	2011 Analog Award	Novella	4th Place	
Arvies	2011 Million Writers Award	-	Won	
Arvies	2011 Nebula Award	Short Story	Nominated	
War of the Marionettes	2011 Kurd Laßwitz Award	Foreign Work	Nominated	
Her Husband's Hands	2012 Nebula Award	Short Story	Nominated	
Her Husband's Hands	2013 Grand Prix de l'Imaginaire	Foreign Short story/Collection of Foreign Short Stories	Nominated	
Her Husband's Hands	2014 Premio Ignotus	Foreign Story	Nominated	
Sleeping Dogs	2015 Analog Award	Novella	3rd Place	
Down Please: The Only Recorded Adventure of Lars Fouton, Captain's Lift Operator on the Starship Magnificent	2015 Analog Award	Short Story	2nd Place	
The Coward's Option	2016 Analog Award	Novella	Won	
The Soul Behind the Face	2016 Analog Award	Novella	3rd Place	
The Thing About Shapes to Come	2017 Grand Prix de l'Imaginaire	Foreign Short story/Collection of Foreign Short Stories	Nominated	
A Stab of the Knife	2018 Analog Award	Novella	3rd Place	
Blurred Lives	2018 Analog Award	Novella	4th Place	
The Unnecessary Parts of the Story	2018 Analog Award	Short Story	Won	
The Gorilla in a Tutu Principle or, Pecan Pie at Minnie and Earl's	2019 Analog Award	Novella	Won	
The Savannah Problem	2019 Analog Award	Novella	2nd Place	
The Ten Things She Said While Dying: An Annotation	2019 World Fantasy Award	Short Fiction	Nominated	
Draiken Dies	2020 Analog Award	Novella	Won	
The Silence Before I Sleep	2021 Analog Award	Novella	3rd Place	
The Last Science Fiction Story	2021 Analog Award	Short Story	3rd Place	
Burning the Ladder	2022 Analog Award	Novella	2nd Place	
A Tableau of Things That Are	2022 Eugie Award	-	Nominated	
The Third Claw of God	2022 Grand Prix de l'Imaginaire	Foreign Novel	Nominated	
Unfamiliar Gods	2023 Seiun Award	Translated Short Story	Nominated	
To Fight the Colossus	2023 Analog Award	Novella	4th Place	

== Bibliography ==
=== Books ===
- X-Men and Spider-Man: The Present, Berkley Boulevard, 1998 (with Tom DeFalco)
- Spider-Man: The Gathering of the Sinister Six, Berkley Boulevard, 1999
- Spider-Man: The Revenge of the Sinister Six, Ibooks, 2001
- Spider-Man: The Secret of the Sinister Six, Ibooks, 2002
- My Ox Is Broken: Roadblocks, Detours, Fast Forwards, and Other Great Moments from TV's THE AMAZING RACE (non-fiction). Benbella Books, 2006
- The Unauthorized Harry Potter (non-fiction). Borders Books, 2007
- Emissaries from the Dead: An Andrea Cort Novel. HarperCollins Eos, 2008
- The Shallow End of the Pool. Creeping Hemlock Press, 2008
- The Third Claw of God: An Andrea Cort Novel. HarperCollins Eos, 2009
- Fake Alibis. By Frank Sibila, with Adam-Troy Castro and Caren Kennedy. BenBella, 2009
- War of the Marionettes: An Andrea Cort Novel. (German). Lubbe, 2010
- V Is for Vampire. With Johnny Atomic. Eos, 2011
- Z Is for Zombie. With Johnny Atomic. Eos, 2011
- Gustav Gloom and the People Taker. Grosset and Dunlap, 2012
- Gustav Gloom and the Nightmare Vault. Grosset & Dunlap, 2013
- Gustav Gloom and the Four Terrors. Grosset & Dunlap, 2013
- Gustav Gloom and the Cryptic Carousel. Grosset & Dunlap, 2014
- Gustav Gloom and the Inn of Shadows. Grosset and Dunlap, 2015
- Gustav Gloom and the Castle of Fear. Grosset and Dunlap, 2016

=== Short fiction collections ===
- Lost in Booth Nine (1993)
- A Desperate, Decaying Darkness (2000)
- An Alien Darkness (2000)
- Vossoff and Nimmitz: Just a Couple of Idiots Reupholstering Space and Time (2002)
- With the Stars in their Eyes (with Jerry Oltion) (2003)
- Tangled Strings (2003)
- Her Husband's Hands and Other Stories (2014)
- And Other Stories (2019)
- The Author's Wife Vs. the Giant Robot and Other Stories (2022)
- Minnie and Earl (2023)

=== Short stories ===
(Uncollected)

- Clearance to Land (1989)
- Confusing Sequel to a Story You Haven't Read (1990)
- Synchronicity (1992)
- The House of Nails (1993)
- The Telltale Head (1993)
- Scars: A Romance in Seven Acts (1993)
- Close (1993)
- Death Rents a Video (1994)
- Jesus Used a Paperclip (1994)
- Razorface Did That! (1994)
- The Slow Hit (1994)
- Crucifixon (1995)
- Ragz (1995)
- The Good, the Bad, the Danged (1995)
- The Hand Inside (1995)
- Vend-A-Witch (1995)
- Family Album (1996)
- The Way Things Ought to Be (1996)
- What Happened Next (1997)
- Crisis on Ward H! (1998)
- Suds (1998)
- The Death of Love (1998)
- The Second Time Around (1998)
- The Well (1998)
- Vocabulary (1998)
- Windshield (1998)
- The Astronaut from Wyoming (1999) (with Jerry Oltion)
- The Adventure of the Garrulous Codger (2003)
- Fantasy Room (2004)
- Good for the Soul (2005)
- After the Protocols (2006)
- The Night of the Living POTUS (2008)
- After the Ice (2008)
- Among the Tchi (2009)
- The Anteroom (2010)
- During the Pause (2012)
- Another Friendly Day in the Antique Trade (2014)
- The Thing About Shapes to Come (2014)
- The Totals (2014)
- Hide and Shriek (2014)
- In the Temple of Celestial Pleasures (2014)
- Down Please: The Only Recorded Adventure of Lars Fouton, Captain's Lift Operator on the Starship Magnificent (2015)
- Framing Mortensen (2016)
- Death Every Seventy-Two Minutes (2017)
- Shakesville (2017) (with Alvaro Zinos-Amaro)
- Unfamiliar Gods (2017) (with Judi B. Castro)
- Q & A (2017)
- James, in the Golden Sunlight of the Hereafter (2017)
- A Touch of Heart (2017) (with Alvaro Zinos-Amaro)
- The Mouth of the Oyster (2017) (with Alvaro Zinos-Amaro)
- The Streets of Babel (2018)
- Pitcher Plant (2018)
- The Unnecessary Parts of the Story (2018)
- The Ten Things She Said While Dying: An Annotation (2018)
- Example (2019)
- The Minor Superhero, at Home after His Series Ends (2019)
- Sand Castles (2019)
- On an Old Man's Contemplation of an Archway Sealed with Stones (2019)
- Genesis for Dyslexics (2019)
- Sacrid's Pod (2019)
- Dollhouse (2019)
- Eros Pratfalled, Or, Adrift in the Cosmos with Lasagna and Mary Steenburgen (2019)
- Fortune's Final Hand (2020)
- Today's Question of the Day in Waverly, Ohio (2020)
- Many Happy Returns (2020)
- Decorating with Luke (2020)
- The Time Traveler's Advice to the Lovelorn (2020)
- The End of the World Measured in Values of N (2020)
- The Monkey Trap (2020)
- The Wallpaper Out of Space (2020)
- Answering the Questions You Might Have About the Kharbat (2021)
- Rotten Little Town: An Oral History (Abridged) (2021)
- The Last Science Fiction Story (2021)
- And Now, a Preview of Coming Attractions (2021)
- A Tableau of Things That Are (2021)
- Judi (2021)
- The Silence Before I Sleep (2021)
- Glimpses in Amber (2021)
- Ten Scenes from a Typical Day in the Life of the All-Powerful Despot (2021)
- Fairy Tale (2021)
- Orientation (2022)
- The Last Act at the Time Cabaret (2022)
- Cards on the Table (2022)
- My Future Self, Refused (2022)
- The Arm Ouroboros (2022)
- One Wild Night (2022)
- The Conflagration at the Museum of You (2022)
- With the Wheeze of a Glass Sentence (2022)
- The Day the Earthman Didn't Show (2023)
- An Inconvenient Man (2023)
- Spaceman Jones (2023)
- To Fight the Colossus (2023)
- Five Things That Go Through Your Mind After the Masked Killer Decapitates You with an Axe and Your Still-Living Head Has a Few Seconds of Consciousness Left to Gaze at Your Twitching Body (2023)
- Seed (2023)
- Farewell to Faust (2024)
- Gab (2024)
- The Three Thousand, Four Hundred Twenty-Third Law of Robotics (2024)
- The Terrible Secret of the Immortal Bards (2024)
- Minnie and Earl Have a Kitten (2024)
- Amelia's Story (2024)
- What We Plan to Do with You (2024)
- Message in a Babel (2025)

== See also ==
- List of horror fiction writers
- List of science-fiction authors
- List of fantasy authors
