= The Cellar (novel) =

1980 novel by Richard Laymon

- First edition
- Author: Richard Laymon
- Language: English
- Genre: Horror
- Published: 1980
- Publisher: Warner Books
- Publication place: United States
- Media type: Print (hardback & paperback)
- Followed by: The Beast House

The Cellar is a 1980 horror novel by American author Richard Laymon. It was Laymon's first published novel, and together with sequels The Beast House, The Midnight Tour, and the novella Friday Night in Beast House, forms the series known by fans of Laymon as "The Beast House Chronicles." The Cellar is an example of a splatterpunk novel, containing much extreme violence and gore, as well as adult themes including rape, incest, paedophilia, and serial murder. Laymon is often associated with this genre.

== Synopsis ==
Donna, the book's protagonist, goes on the run with her daughter Sandy when she learns that her ex-husband has been released from prison after serving a sentence for sexually abusing Sandy. After a car accident leaves them stranded in the small California coastal town of Malcasa Point, Donna and Sandy cross paths with Judgement Rucker, a mercenary hired to track down and kill the murderous creature that supposedly haunts a local tourist attraction, the Beast House. Judge's employer, Larry, is an elderly man who had a traumatic encounter with the Beast as a child. Over the years the Beast has been connected with various rapes and murders that have happened in the house. Meanwhile, Donna's ex-husband is set on revenge and stalks her.

== Reception ==
Like much of Laymon's work, The Cellar has been controversial for its extreme content, especially in regards to its depiction of sexual and sadistic violence. It has also been dismissed by some critics as poorly written.

In his non-fiction book about the horror genre, Danse Macabre, Stephen King shows dislike of the novel: "There are haunted-house stories beyond numbering, most of them not very good (The Cellar, by Richard Laymon, is one example of the less successful breed)." However, King would go on to praise Laymon's writing, a pull-quote attributed to King frequently appearing on his novels, such as Funland: "If you've missed Laymon, you've missed a treat."

Will Errickson, a genre enthusiast and historian, who with Grady Hendrix compiled Paperbacks from Hell, has been scathing of the novel (and Laymon's work in general), describing it as "easily one of the very worst books in the genre that I have ever read." Detailing what Errickson perceives as the distasteful use of sexual violence as a theme, he goes on to say that "Laymon "writes" without wit or insight and seems to be making the plot up as he types."

Nonetheless, the "Beast House" series, of which The Cellar is the first, has been consistently popular with Laymon fans, and warranted reprints.

== Limited Edition ==
In 1997, Cemetery Dance Publications printed a limited edition hardcover version of The Cellar under ISBN 1-881475-28-X. The new edition featured an introduction by Bentley Little, an afterword by Laymon himself, and new artwork by Alan M. Clark. It also featured signatures from all three. The book was released in a Slipcased Limited Edition of 500 signed and numbered copies, and a Traycased Lettered Edition of 26 signed and lettered copies.

== Links and references ==
- Cemetery Dance official page for The Cellar
