= Schoharie County, New York =

County in New York, United States

- County
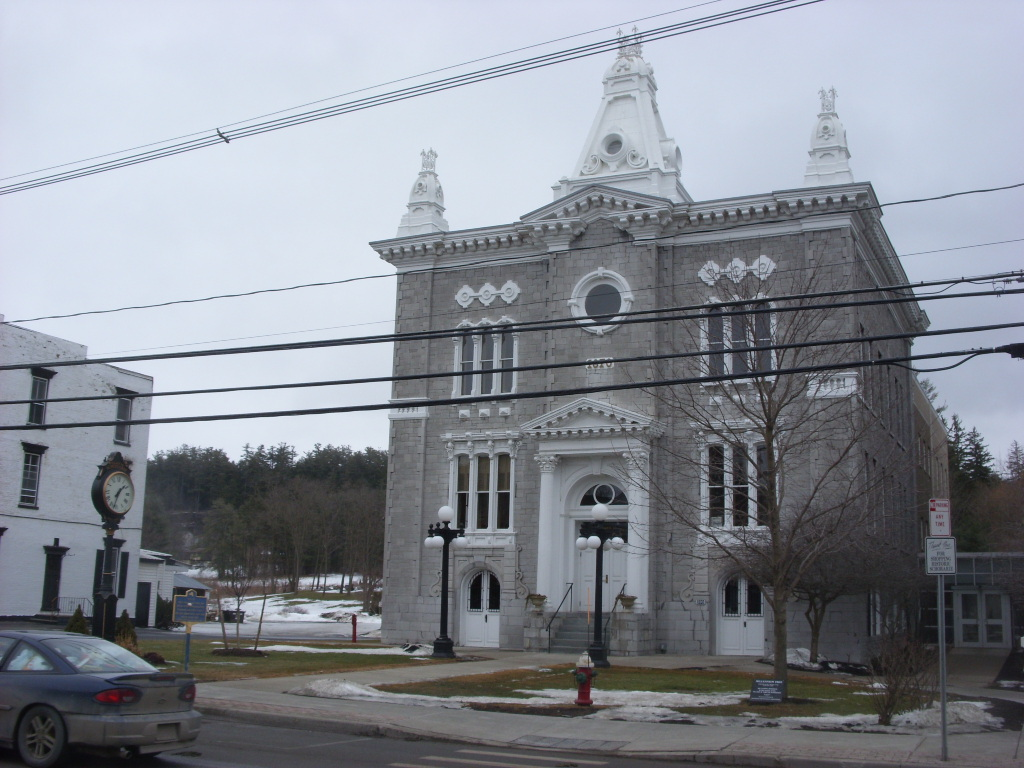
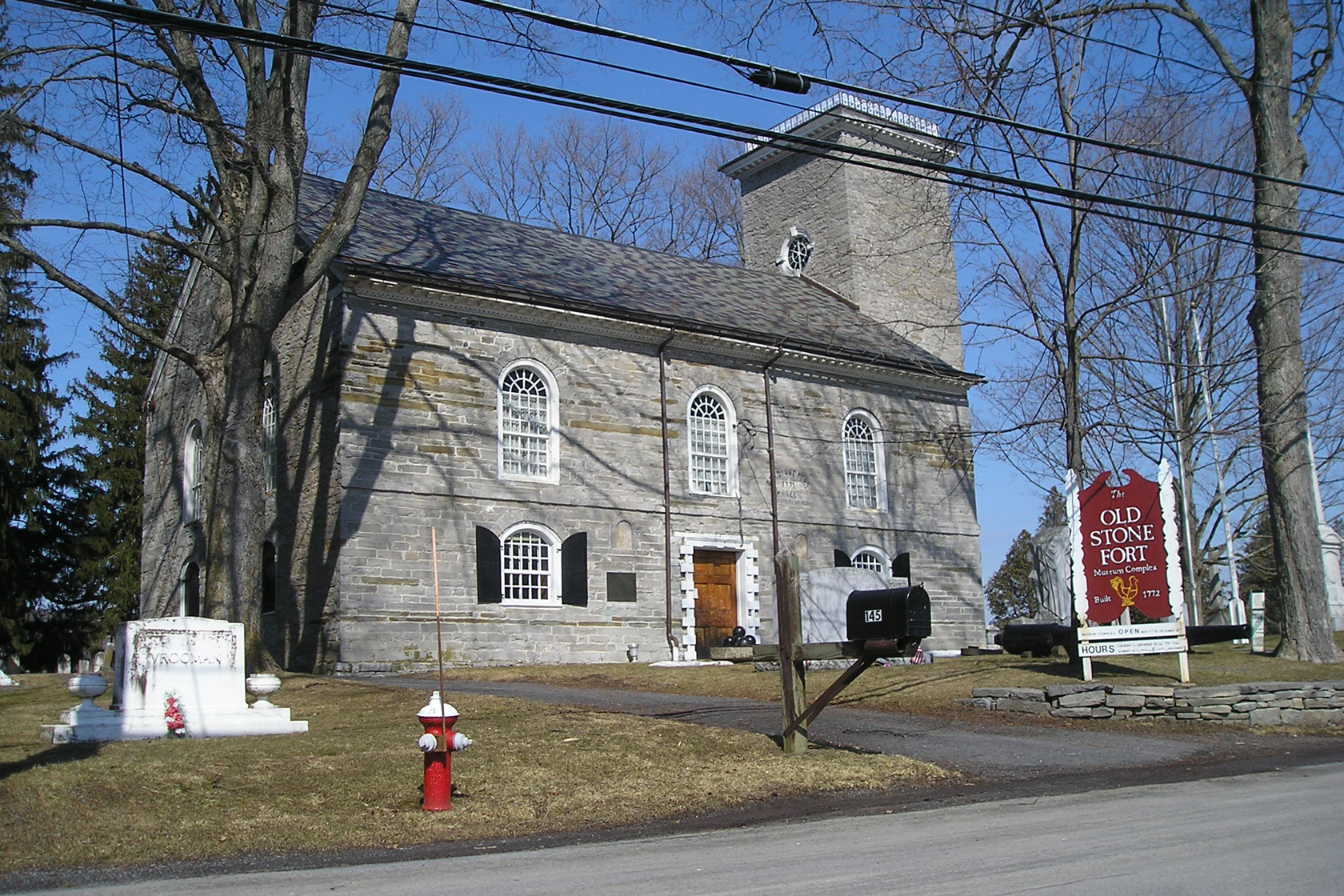
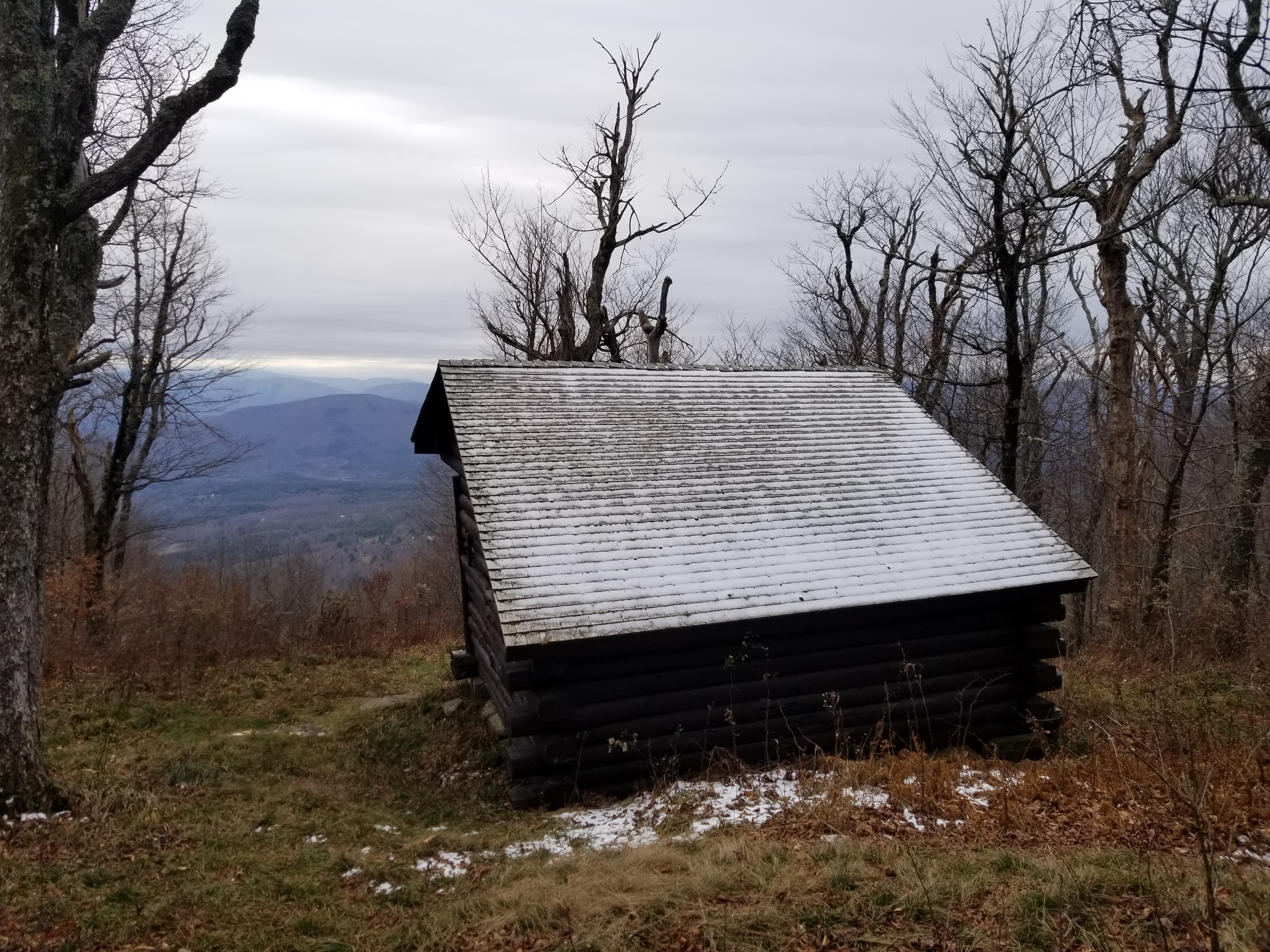
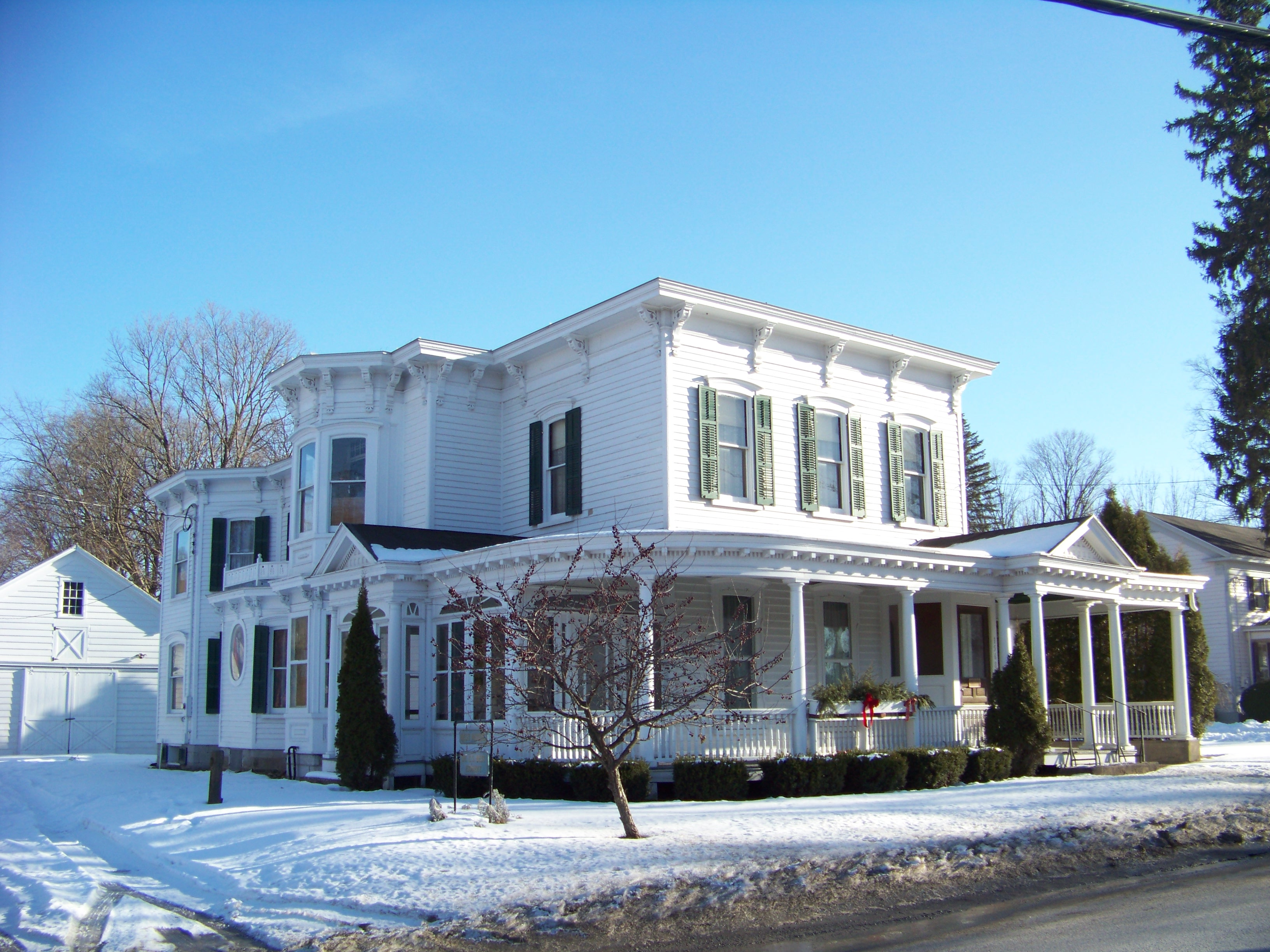
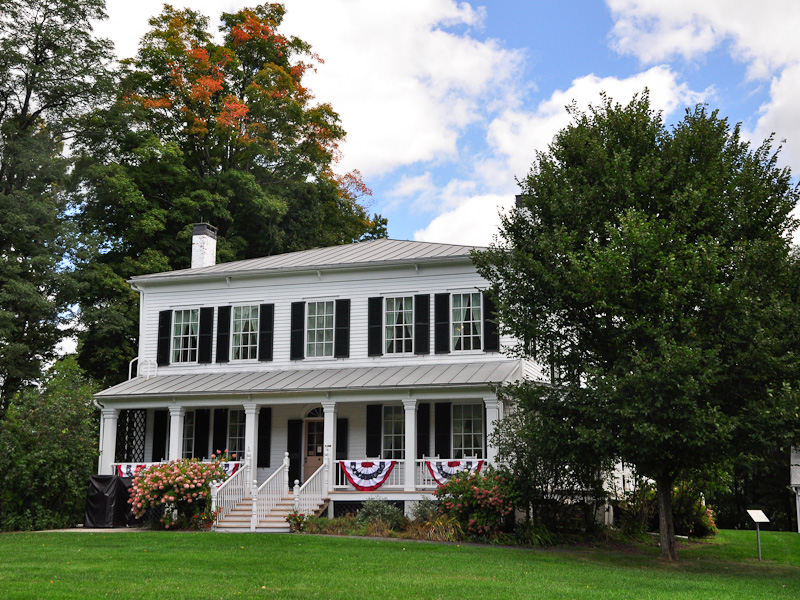
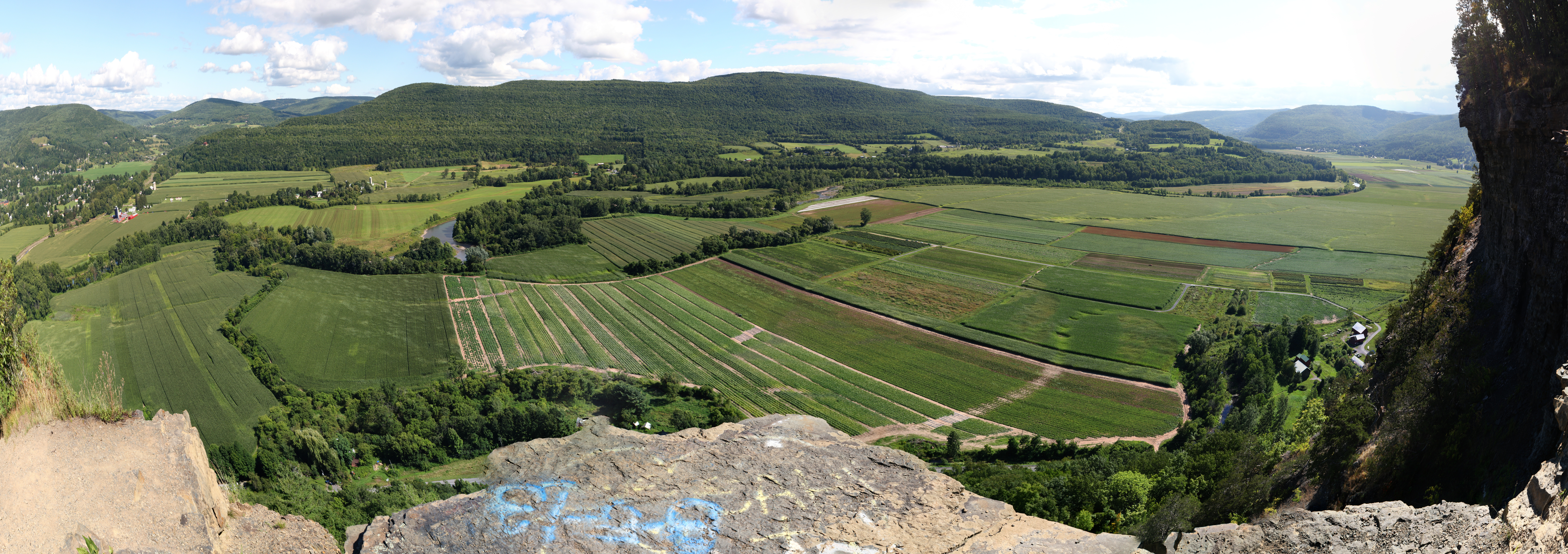
- Left to right, from top: Schoharie County Courthouse, Old Stone Fort (Schoharie, New York), Lean-to at the summit of Huntersfield Mountain, Dr. Christopher S. Best House and Office, Lansing Manor House, view from Vroman's Nose

- Seal

- Location within the U.S. state of New York
- Coordinates: 42°35′N 74°26′W
- Country: United States
- State: New York
- Founded: 1795
- Seat: Schoharie
- Largest village: Cobleskill

Area
  - Total: 626 sq mi (1,620 km^{2})
  - Land: 622 sq mi (1,610 km^{2})
  - Water: 4.5 sq mi (12 km^{2}) 0.7%

Population (2020)
  - Total: 29,714
  - Estimate (2025): 30,176 ▲
  - Density: 47.5/sq mi (18.3/km^{2})
- Time zone: UTC−5 (Eastern)
  - Summer (DST): UTC−4 (EDT)
- Congressional district: 21st
- Website: www.schohariecounty-ny.gov

Schoharie County (/skoʊˈhɛəriː/ skoh-HAIR-ee) is a county in the U.S. state of New York. As of the 2020 census, the population was 29,714, making it the state's fifth-least populous county. The county seat is Schoharie. "Schoharie" comes from a Mohawk word meaning "floating driftwood." Schoharie County is part of the Albany-Schenectady-Troy, NY Metropolitan Statistical Area and thus the Capital District of New York. The county is part of the Mohawk Valley region of the state.

== History ==
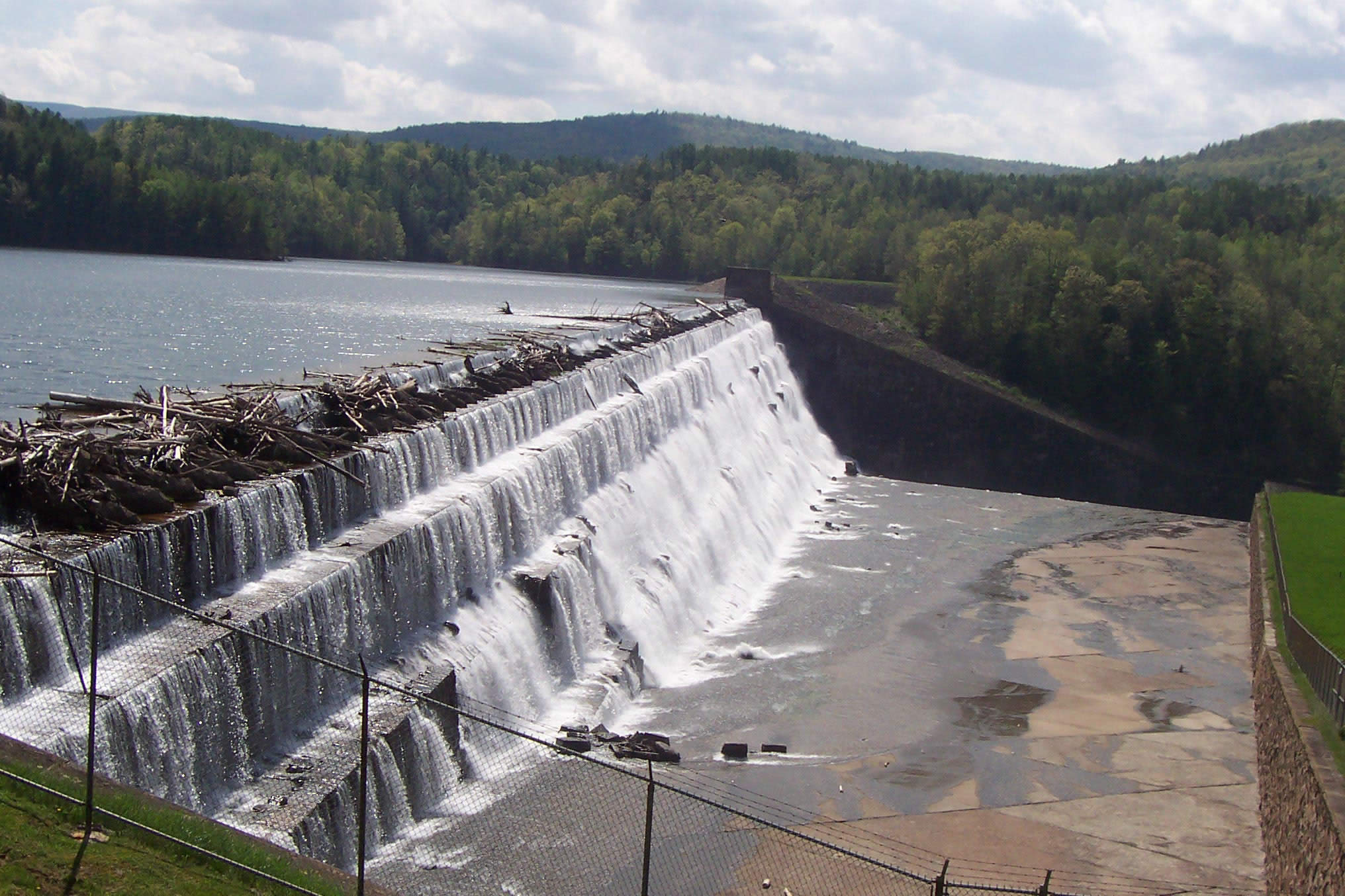
The Gilboa Dam, at the northern end of the Schoharie Reservoir

The large territory of the county was long occupied by the Mohawk Nation and, to the west, the other four tribes of the Iroquois (Haudenosaunee) Confederacy (increased to six with the migration of the Tuscarora). After European colonization of the Northeast started, the Mohawk had a lucrative fur trade with the French coming down from Canada, as well as the early Dutch colonists, and later British and German colonists.

Some Palatine Germans, who worked in camps on the Hudson to pay off their passage in 1710, later settled in this county in the 1720s and 30s. In addition, Scots-Irish immigrants settled in the present Schoharie County area before the American Revolutionary War, especially near Cherry Creek.

=== Political organization ===
After Great Britain defeated the Dutch in the Second Anglo-Dutch War and received New Netherland via the Treaty of Breda, they began to establish counties in the New York territory in 1683. The present Schoharie County was first part of Albany County. In theory, it extended westward to the Pacific Ocean, as the colonists wanted to keep their options open. This county was reduced in size on July 3, 1766, by the creation of Cumberland County, and further on March 16, 1770, by the creation of Gloucester County, both containing territory now part of Vermont.

On March 12, 1772, what was left of Albany County was split into three parts, one retaining the name Albany County. Tryon County was formed from the western portion of the territory (and thus, since no western boundary was specified, theoretically still extended west to the Pacific). The eastern boundary of Tryon County was approximately five miles west of the present city of Schenectady, and the county included the western part of the Adirondack Mountains and the area west of the West Branch of the Delaware River. The area then designated Tryon County was eventually organized into what are now 37 counties of New York State. The county was named for William Tryon, colonial governor of New York.

In the years preceding 1776, as social and political tensions rose in the colony, most of the Loyalists in Tryon County, then on the frontier, fled to Canada. In 1784, after the peace treaty that ended the Revolutionary War and the establishment of states, the new government changed Tryon County's name to Montgomery County to honor United States General Richard Montgomery, who had captured several places in Canada and died trying to take the city of Quebec.

The state continued to organize new counties. In 1789, Montgomery County was reduced in size by the splitting off of Ontario County. It was originally much larger than the present county, including present-day Allegany, Cattaraugus, Chautauqua, Erie, Genesee, Livingston, Monroe, Niagara, Orleans, Steuben, Wyoming, Yates, and part of Schuyler and Wayne counties.

In 1791, Otsego, Herkimer and Tioga Counties were split off from Montgomery.

In 1795, Schoharie County was created by joining portions of Otsego and Albany counties.

=== Revolutionary War ===
This was an area of fighting during the American Revolutionary War. On the frontier, colonists were subject to raids by British and their Iroquois allies. Four of the six tribes allied with the British, hoping to repel the colonists from their territory.

== Geography ==
Schoharie County is in central New York State, west of Albany and southeast of Utica.

According to the U.S. Census Bureau, the county has a total area of 626 square miles (1,620 km^{2}), of which 622 square miles (1,610 km^{2}) is land and 4.5 square miles (12 km^{2}) (0.7%) is water.

Much of the southern portion of the county lies within the Catskill Mountains. Land rises in both directions quite rapidly east and east of Schoharie Creek in the middle of the county. In contrast, the northern part of the county is predominately small hills and valleys. More than 75% of the county's population lives in the north, closer to the Mohawk River, the historic transportation route east and west through the state. Schoharie Creek is a northward-flowing tributary of the Mohawk River. The Schoharie Creek watershed spans an area of approximately 950 square miles (2,500 km^{2}). The course of Schoharie Creek includes two reservoir-dam systems.

The Gilboa Dam and the Schoharie Reservoir are part of the New York City Water Supply System. The New York Power Authority operates the Blenheim-Gilboa Dam and its reservoir to produce hydroelectric power. The headwaters of the Delaware River are located in the town of Jefferson. Tributaries of the Susquehanna River are located in the towns of Jefferson and Summit.

The highest point is at the summit of Huntersfield Mountain on the southern boundary with Greene County, at 3,423 feet (1,043 m) above sea level. The lowest point is where the Montgomery County line meets Schoharie Creek, 520 feet (160 m) above sea level. The most prominent geological feature is Vroman's Nose, near the village of Middleburgh in the town of Fulton.

=== Adjacent counties ===
- Albany County - east
- Delaware County - southwest
- Greene County - southeast
- Montgomery County - north
- Otsego County - west
- Schenectady County - northeast

== Demographics ==
Historical population
Census	Pop.	Note	%±
1800	9,808		—
1810	18,945		93.2%
1820	23,154		22.2%
1830	27,902		20.5%
1840	32,358		16.0%
1850	33,548		3.7%
1860	34,469		2.7%
1870	33,340		−3.3%
1880	32,910		−1.3%
1890	29,164		−11.4%
1900	26,854		−7.9%
1910	23,855		−11.2%
1920	21,303		−10.7%
1930	19,667		−7.7%
1940	20,812		5.8%
1950	22,703		9.1%
1960	22,616		−0.4%
1970	24,750		9.4%
1980	29,710		20.0%
1990	31,859		7.2%
2000	31,582		−0.9%
2010	32,749		3.7%
2020	29,714		−9.3%
2025 (est.)	30,176	▲	1.6%
U.S. Decennial Census; 1790-1960 1900-1990; 1990-2000 2010-2020

|estyear=2023 |estimate=30105 |estref=

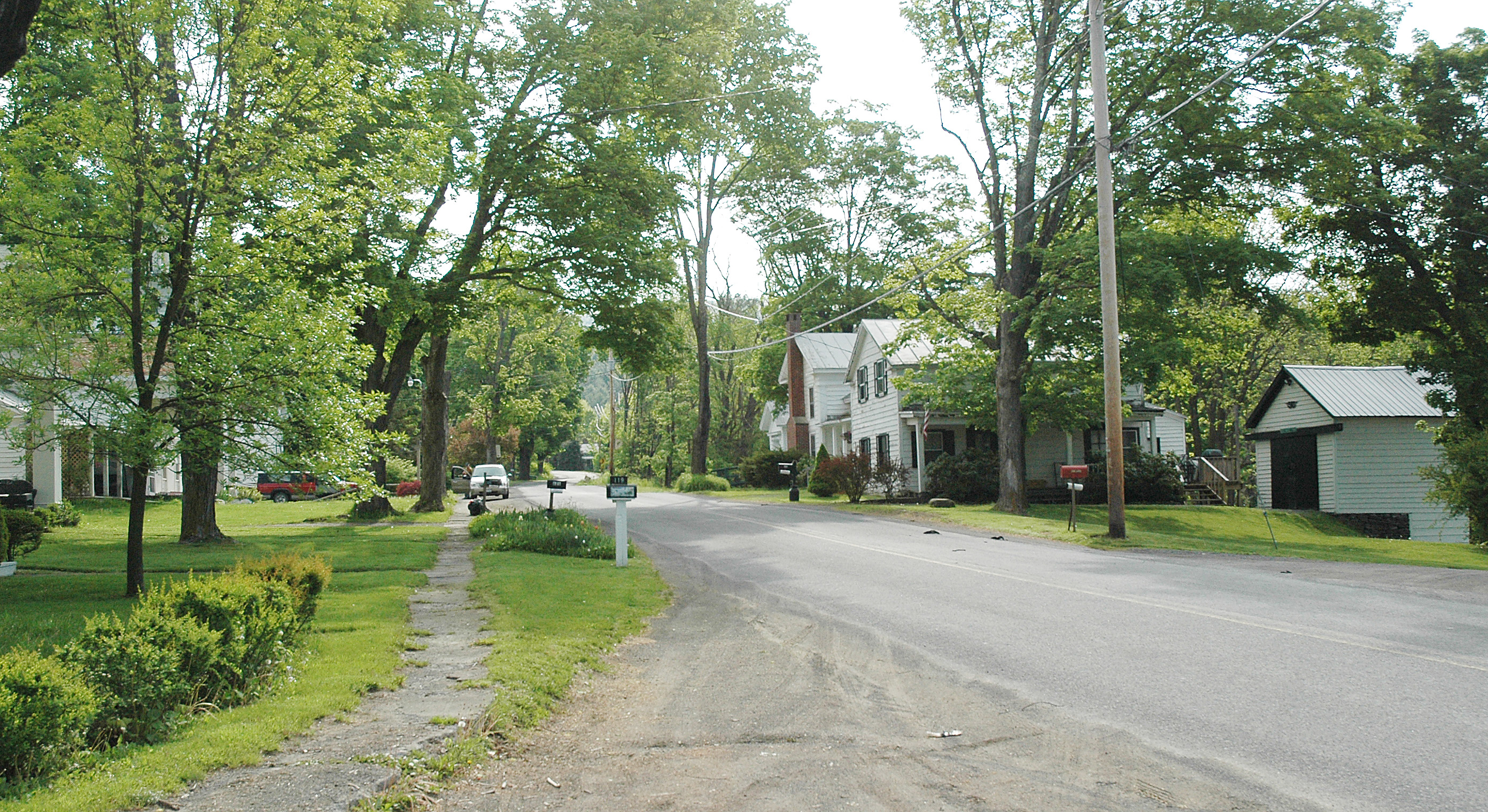
Main street in the hamlet of Breakabeen

=== 2020 census ===
Schoharie County, New York – Racial and ethnic composition Note: the US Census treats Hispanic/Latino as an ethnic category. This table excludes Latinos from the racial categories and assigns them to a separate category. Hispanics/Latinos may be of any race.
Race / Ethnicity (NH = Non-Hispanic)	Pop 1980	Pop 1990	Pop 2000	Pop 2010	Pop 2020	% 1980	% 1990	% 2000	% 2010	% 2020
White alone (NH)	29,001	30,767	30,112	30,742	26,658	97.61%	96.57%	95.35%	93.87%	89.72%
Black or African American alone (NH)	246	369	377	394	277	0.83%	1.16%	1.19%	1.20%	0.93%
Native American or Alaska Native alone (NH)	53	68	93	54	68	0.18%	0.21%	0.29%	0.16%	0.23%
Asian alone (NH)	59	102	120	217	210	0.20%	0.32%	0.38%	0.66%	0.71%
Native Hawaiian or Pacific Islander alone (NH)	x	x	7	3	3	x	x	0.02%	0.01%	0.01%
Other race alone (NH)	28	15	43	30	123	0.09%	0.05%	0.14%	0.09%	0.41%
Mixed race or Multiracial (NH)	x	x	242	385	1,300	x	x	0.77%	1.18%	4.38%
Hispanic or Latino (any race)	323	538	588	924	1,075	1.09%	1.69%	1.86%	2.82%	3.62%
Total	29,710	31,859	31,582	32,749	29,714	100.00%	100.00%	100.00%	100.00%	100.00%

=== 2000 census ===
As of the census of 2000, there were 31,582 people, 11,991 households and 8,177 families residing in the county. The population density was 51 inhabitants per square mile (20/km^{2}). There were 15,915 housing units at an average density of 26 units per square mile (10/km^{2}). The racial makeup of the county was 95.06% White, 2.14% Black or African American, 0.30% Native American, 0.49% Asian, 0.02% Pacific Islander, 0.36% from other races, and 0.93% from two or more races. 1.86% of the population were Hispanic or Latino of any race. 20.9% were of German, 15.6% Irish, 11.5% American, 10.8% Italian and 9.7% English ancestry according to Census 2000. 95.5% spoke English, 1.7% Spanish and 1.0% German as their first language.

There were 11,991 households, out of which 31.20% had children under the age of 18 living with them, 54.20% were married couples living together, 9.30% had a female householder with no husband present, and 31.80% were non-families. 25.80% of all households were made up of individuals, and 11.70% had someone living alone who was 65 years of age or older. The average household size was 2.49 and the average family size was 2.98.

In the county, the population was spread out, with 24.00% under the age of 18, 10.60% from 18 to 24, 26.20% from 25 to 44, 24.40% from 45 to 64, and 14.90% who were 65 years of age or older. The median age was 38 years. For every 100 females there were 99.00 males. For every 100 females age 18 and over, there were 97.80 males.

The median income for a household in the county was $36,585, and the median income for a family was $43,118. Males had a median income of $31,725 versus $24,475 for females. The per capita income for the county was $17,778. About 7.90% of families and 11.40% of the population were below the poverty line, including 13.70% of those under age 18 and 8.60% of those age 65 or over.

== Economy ==
Schoharie County's primary industry is agriculture. Farms are situated all over the county and farm stands and other agriculture-related businesses are operated throughout it. Many residents work in the Capital District, New York. Walmart has a distribution center in the Village of Sharon Springs. The I-88 corridor is growing due to the short commute to Schenectady and Albany.

The Catskills-area villages have a number of historic hotels, as it was a vacation destination in the early 20th century. Vacation homes are common in the county.

A growing tourist industry attracts visitors for recreation, the landscape and historic destinations. These include Howe Caverns, Vroman's Nose, the Old Stone Fort, and the Iroquois Indian Museum, among others. The Old Blenheim Bridge, a covered bridge, was among the attractions until it was destroyed by Hurricane Irene in August 2011. Work to rebuild it began in 2017.

== Government ==
As of 2024, Schoharie County is part of New York's 21st congressional district, represented by Republican Elise Stefanik; part of New York's 51st State Senate district, represented by Republican Peter Oberacker; and part of New York's 102nd Assembly district, represented by Republican Christopher Tague.

The sheriff of Schoharie County, Tony Desmond, received national attention for publicly stating during the 2013 election that he would not enforce the NY SAFE Act. The current sheriff, Ronald R. Stevens, succeeded Desmond in 2018.

From 1828 to 1916 with the exception of 1848, Schoharie County consistently backed Democratic Party candidates in presidential elections; it was the only county in the state to support William Jennings Bryan over William McKinley in 1896. After 1916, the county has backed the Democratic candidate only twice, in 1964 and 1996.

United States presidential election results for Schoharie County, New York
Year	Republican		Democratic		Third party(ies)	
Year	No.	%	No.	%	No.	%
1884	3,472	38.49%	5,339	59.18%	210	2.33%
1888	3,696	41.36%	5,006	56.01%	235	2.63%
1892	3,236	39.48%	4,531	55.28%	430	5.25%
1896	3,838	46.58%	4,203	51.01%	199	2.42%
1900	3,860	46.19%	4,317	51.66%	180	2.15%
1904	3,672	46.22%	4,010	50.47%	263	3.31%
1908	3,393	45.22%	3,841	51.19%	270	3.60%
1912	2,391	36.76%	3,355	51.58%	759	11.67%
1916	2,851	43.50%	3,457	52.75%	246	3.75%
1920	5,572	58.43%	3,697	38.76%	268	2.81%
1924	6,142	62.17%	3,413	34.55%	324	3.28%
1928	6,906	67.65%	2,926	28.66%	377	3.69%
1932	5,513	53.43%	4,684	45.40%	121	1.17%
1936	6,895	60.30%	4,229	36.99%	310	2.71%
1940	7,316	64.10%	4,073	35.68%	25	0.22%
1944	6,546	60.61%	4,219	39.06%	36	0.33%
1948	6,751	61.27%	4,032	36.59%	236	2.14%
1952	8,972	71.78%	3,509	28.07%	18	0.14%
1956	8,851	73.28%	3,227	26.72%	0	0.00%
1960	7,644	63.69%	4,342	36.18%	16	0.13%
1964	4,193	36.81%	7,187	63.09%	11	0.10%
1968	6,166	57.21%	3,883	36.03%	728	6.76%
1972	8,644	69.68%	3,730	30.07%	32	0.26%
1976	7,154	57.16%	5,250	41.95%	111	0.89%
1980	6,382	52.05%	4,715	38.45%	1,165	9.50%
1984	8,692	67.97%	3,996	31.25%	100	0.78%
1988	7,008	55.90%	5,389	42.99%	139	1.11%
1992	5,678	40.14%	4,997	35.32%	3,472	24.54%
1996	5,353	40.37%	5,902	44.51%	2,006	15.13%
2000	7,459	55.03%	5,390	39.77%	705	5.20%
2004	8,591	59.01%	5,630	38.67%	338	2.32%
2008	8,071	56.04%	6,009	41.72%	322	2.24%
2012	7,467	56.54%	5,427	41.09%	313	2.37%
2016	8,831	62.85%	4,240	30.18%	979	6.97%
2020	9,903	63.04%	5,345	34.02%	462	2.94%
2024	10,423	64.69%	5,547	34.43%	142	0.88%

== Communities ==
=== Towns ===
- Blenheim
- Broome
- Carlisle
- Cobleskill
- Conesville
- Esperance
- Fulton
- Gilboa
- Jefferson
- Middleburgh
- Richmondville
- Schoharie
- Seward
- Sharon
- Summit
- Wright

=== Villages ===
- Cobleskill
- Esperance
- Middleburgh
- Richmondville
- Schoharie (county seat)
- Sharon Springs

=== Census-designated places ===
- Central Bridge
- Jefferson
- North Blenheim

=== Other hamlets ===
- Breakabeen
- Charlotteville
- Esperance
- Fultonham
- Gallupville
- Grovenors Corners
- Livingstonville
- Sloansville
- Warnerville
- West Middleburgh

== Transportation ==
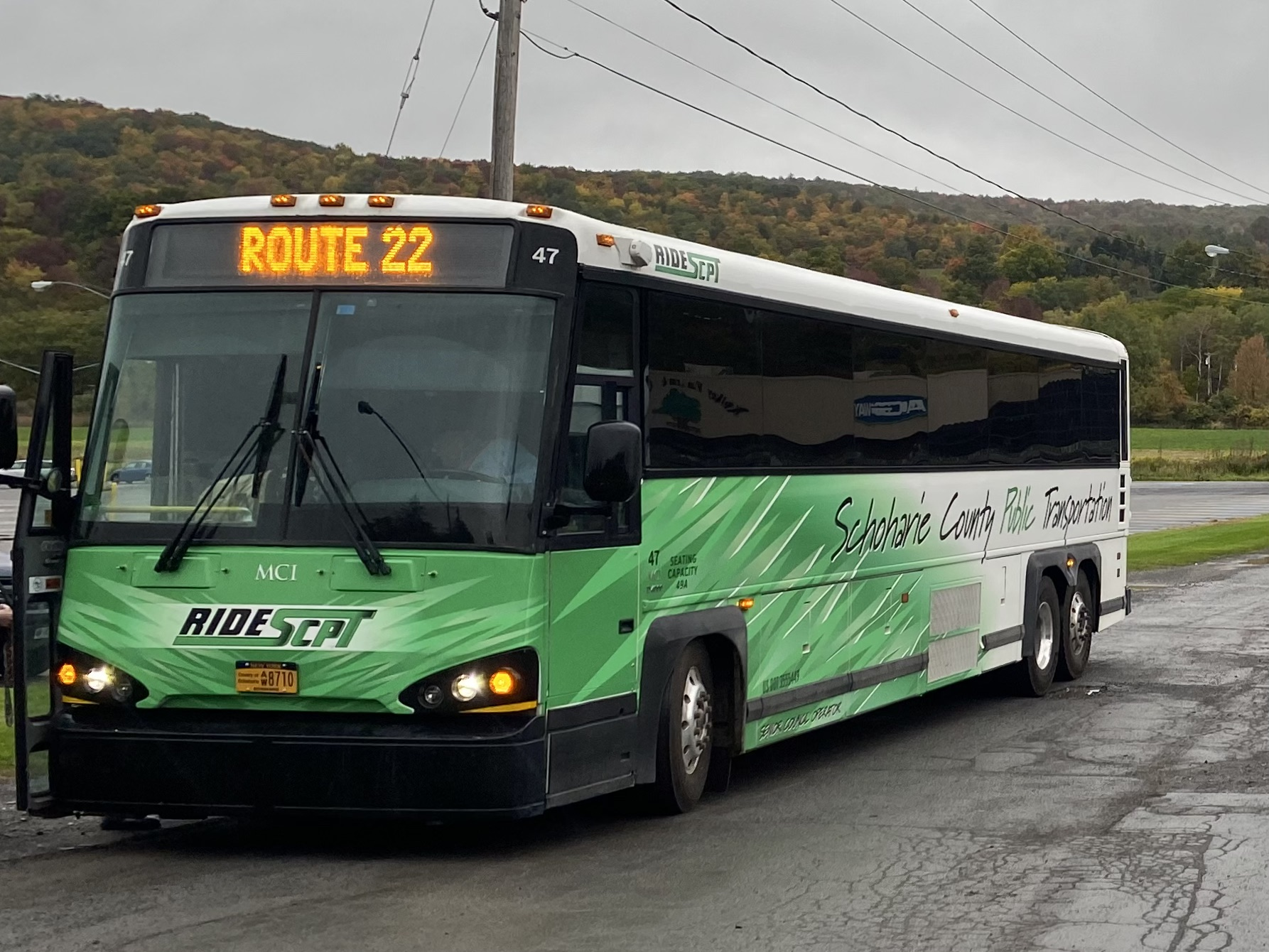
A commuter coach bus of Schoharie County Public Transportation

=== Interstate and other major highways ===
Schoharie County is served by Interstate 88, which is paralleled by Route 7 as well as U.S. Route 20 in the north of the county running in the east–west direction. Route 10, Route 30 (which splits into Route 30A north of Schoharie) and Route 145 run in the north–south direction in the county.

- I-88
- US 20
- NY 7
- NY 10
- NY 30
- NY 30A
- NY 145

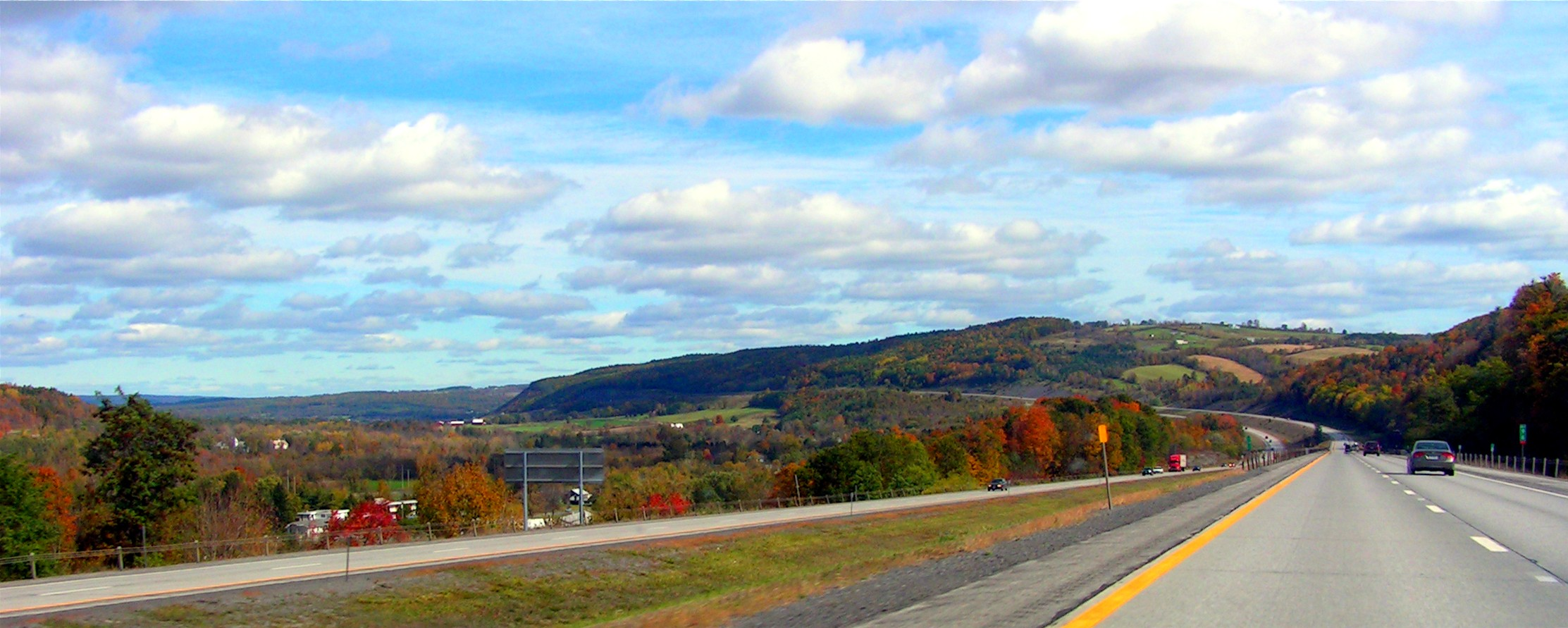
Eastbound on I-88 in Schoharie County

=== Bus ===
Bus service is provided by Schoharie County Public Transportation, with commuter routes to Albany as well as local and demand-responsive services.

=== Rail (Former) ===
Passenger rail service in Schoharie County was formerly provided by the Delaware and Hudson Railway on their Susquehanna Division until passenger service was discontinued in the 1960s. Today, freight service continues along the Susquehanna Division provided by Norfolk Southern.

=== Airports ===
The nearest commercial airport to Schoharie County is Albany International Airport.

== Notable sites ==
A prominent site in the county is the Old Stone Fort, used for defense against British and allied Indian attacks during the Revolution. It was later used as an armory during the Civil War.

During the 19th century, the Middleburgh-Schoharie Railroad was constructed through the county.

In 1981 the Iroquois Indian Museum opened in a new building near Howe Caverns in Cobleskill. It has the largest collection of Iroquois art in the United States and includes a performance center where Iroquois present traditional and contemporary music and dance.

The Gilboa Fossil Forest is home to one of the earth's oldest forests, with petrified tree trunks dating back over 380 million years to the Devonian period. Numerous fossils are on display at the Gilboa Museum near the Schoharie Reservoir.

== Notable people ==
- Peter I. Borst (1797–1848), politician
- William C. Bouck (1796–1859), soldier
- Amasa Clark (1820s–1927), soldier
- John McGiver (1913–1975), actor
- Timothy Murphy (1751–1818), soldier
- J. O'B. Scobey (1854–1910), politician
- Nicole Sullivan (born 1970), actress
- George Westinghouse (1846–1914), engineer, inventor and entrepreneur
- Uriah Wood (1830–1913), politician

== In popular culture ==
- The novel Midnight's Lair (1983) by Richard Laymon was about explorers trapped in Howe Caverns.
- David Letterman, a late-night TV host, did a parody about the town of Schoharie.
- The two season reality series, The Fabulous Beekman Boys was set in Sharon Springs.
- In August 2010, the series Ghost Hunters filmed an episode about the Old Stone Fort; it aired December 8, 2010.
- A finalist on A Shot at Love with Tila Tequila took the show to the bowling alley in Cobleskill.
- The Boulder, Colorado Jam band String Cheese Incident mentions Schoharie County in the song 100 Year Flood.
- The 2020 film The World to Come is set in Schoharie County in 1856.

== See also ==
- Schoharie limousine crash
- List of counties in New York
- National Register of Historic Places listings in Schoharie County, New York
