= Mother's Boy =

A mother's boy is a man excessively attached to his mother.

Mother's boy(s), mummy's boy(s) or mama's boy may also refer to:

== Films ==
- Mother's Boy (1913 film)
- Mother's Boy (1929 film)
- Mummy's Boys, a 1936 American comedy film
- Mother's Boys, a 1994 thriller film featuring Jamie Lee Curtis
- Mama's Boy, a 2007 comedy starring Diane Keaton

== Music ==
- Mama's Boys, a hard rock/heavy metal band from Northern Ireland
- Mama's Boys Music, a management company and record label
- Mama's Boy (album), a 2020 album by LANY
- "Mama's Boy" (Suzi Quatro song), 1979
- "Mama's Boy", a track from the 1984 Ramones' album Too Tough to Die

== Other uses ==
- Mother's Boy, a 2022 novel by Patrick Gale based on the life of Charles Causley
- Mother's Boy, a 1964 play by Sewell Stokes
- Mummy's Boy, a British comic strip
- Mama's Boy, debut novella by Fran Friel
- Mama's Boy (TV series), an American sitcom television series

== See also ==
- Mamaboy, a 2016 film starring Gary Busey
