= Elizabeth Massie =

American author

Elizabeth Spilman Massie is an American author. She lives outside Waynesboro, Virginia with illustrator Cortney Skinner.

== Career ==
Elizabeth Massie is a two-time Bram Stoker Award-winning author of horror novels and short fiction. She won the awards for her novel Sineater and novelette Stephen. In 2022, she was honored with the Horror Writers Association Lifetime Achievement Award.

She has written historical fiction for young adults as well as mainstream fiction, media tie-ins, and non-fiction for American History textbooks and educational readers and testing programs.

Her first short horror story, "Whittler," was published in David B. Silva's The Horror Show magazine in 1984. Since then, her horror fiction has appeared in magazines and anthologies, including, Best New Fantasy and Horror, Best New Horror, Splatterpunks, Inhuman Magazine, Grue, Hottest Blood, A Whisper of Blood, and Kolchak the Night Stalker: Casebook, "Voices in the Darkness", and more. Her story "Lock Her Room" was developed into a short film by Kai Soremekun and aired on the Showtime Network. He story "Abed" was converted into a short independent film by Jenny Lasko, Philip Nutman, and Ryan Lieske. The film was released in the summer 2012.

Massie is the creator of "Skeeryvilletown," a horror cartoon featuring creatures and monsters, which include 3-Eyed Devil Cat, Boo Boy, Wolfie, Fire Breathing Dog O' Death, Bonehead, the Witch Sisters, Rattie, and Battie.

== Bibliography ==
Massie's novels, novelizations, and comics:

- Sineater (1992 - Pan Books, 1994 - Carroll & Graf, 1998 - Leisure, and 2004 - Simon & Schuster/iBooks)
- Southern Discomfort (Dark Regions Press - 1993)
- Welcome Back to the Night (1999 - Leisure) Re-release (2026 Weird House)
- Buffy the Vampire Slayer: Power of Persuasion (1999 - Simon & Schuster)
- Wire Mesh Mothers (2001 - Leisure)
- Shadow Dreams (1996 - Silver Salamander and 2002 - Leisure)
- Dark Shadows: Dreams of the Dark (co-authored with Stephen Mark Rainey) (1999 - HarperCollins)
- The Fear Report (2004 - Bloodletting Press; 2010 Necon E-Books)
- Twisted Branch (written under the pen name "Chris Blaine", 2005 - Berkley Books)
- Homeplace (2007 - Berkley Books)
- The Tudors: King Takes Queen (2008 - Simon Spotlight Entertainment)
- The Tudors: Thy Will Be Done (2009 - Simon Spotlight Entertainment, winner Scribe Award for Best Adapted novel 2010.)
- DD Murphry, Secret Policeman (co-authored with Alan M. Clark) (2009 - Raw Dog Screaming Press)
- Julie Walker is The Phantom in Race Against Death! (2010 Moonstone Books)
- Homegrown (2010 Crossroad Press)
- Afraid (2011 Crossroad Press)
- Sundown (2011 Necon E-Books)
- Hell Gate (2013 DarkFuse)
- Desper Hollow (2013 Apex Publications)
- Ameri-Scares New York: Rips and Wrinkles (2017 Crossroad Press)
- Ameri-Scares California: From the Pit (2017 Crossroad Press)
- Ameri-Scares Maryland: Terror in the Harbor (2017 Crossroad Press)
- Ameri-Scares Virginia: Valley of Secrets (2017 Crossroad Press)
- Ameri-Scares Illinois: The Cemetery Club (2017 Crossroad Press)
- Versailles (2015 Michel Lafon)
- Ameri-Scares North Carolina: Mountain of Mysteries (2018 Crossroad Press)
- Ameri-Scares Tennessee: Winter Haunting (2019 Crossroad Press)
- Ameri-Scares Montana: Ghosts in the Dust (2020 Crossroad Press)
- Ameri-Scares Washington: The Deep Dark Down (2021 Crossroad Press)

=== Collected Stories ===
- Shadow Dreams, Silver Salamander Press, 1996
- The Fear Report (2004 Bloodletting Press)
- A Little Magenta Book of Mean Stories (2005 Borderlands Press)
- Naked, on the Edge (2012 Crossroad Press & Macabre Ink Digital)
- It, Watching (2017, Dark House Press)
- Madame Cruller's Couch and Other Dark and Bizarre Tales (Crossroad Press 2021)
- The Wages of Belief and Other Stories from the Dark Side (Crossroad Press 2025)

=== Short fiction ===
Elizabeth Massie's short works include:

- "Abed" (ss) Still Dead, ed. John M. Skipp & Craig Spector, Bantam 1992
- "And Baby, You Can Sleep While I Drive" (ss) Eulogies, 2006
- "And the Window Was Boarded Shut" (ss) "American Cannibal:, 2023
- "Assault" (ss) The Horror Show Spr 1986
- "Baggie" (ss) Voices in the Darkness, Macabre Ink, Jan 2021
- "Bargains at Binsley’s" (ss) The Horror Show Jan 1987, Bizarre Bazaar #1 1992
- "Bath, The" (ss) Threshold of Fantasy #2, Winter 1985–86
- "Blessed Sleep" (ss) 2AM, Fll 1987
- "Brazo de Dios" (ss) Borderlands 3, ed. Thomas F. Monteleone, Borderlands Press 1993, New Masterpieces of Horror, ed. John Betancourt, Barnes & Noble 1996
- "Camp Site, The" (ss), Deathrealm Spirits, Shortwave Publishing (2023)
- "Cat, Perturbed" (pm) Devil's Wine, Cemetery Dance Publications, 2004
- "Christmas at the Patterson" Christmas Horror Vol. 2, Dark Regions Press, 2017
- "Come Unto Me" (ss) A Dark and Deadly Valley, Silverthought, Jan 2007
- "Corazon de Oro" (ss) Tales of Zorro, ed. Richard Dean Starr, Moonstone Books 2008
- "Crow, Cat, Cow, Child" (ss) Shadow Dreams, Silver Salamander Press, 1996
- "Damaged Goods" (ss) Hottest Blood, ed. Jeff Gelb & Michael Garrett, Pocket 1993
- "Dance of the Spirit Untouched" (ss) Footsteps #8 1987, Palace Corbie v2 #2 1993
- "Dancin’ Man" (ss) Not One of Us Jun 1992
- "Death at Eleven" (ss) Gauntlet #3 1992
- "Death From a Blood Red Sky" (ss) The Spider Chronicles, Moonstone, Jan 2007
- "Devil's Yo-Yo, The" (ss) Cemetery Dance 2009
- "Dibs" (ss) Shadow Dreams, Silver Salamander Press, 1996
- "Don't Look at Me", Tales from the Lake Vol. 1, Crystal Lake Publishing
- "Dooka Dee" (nv) The Fear Report, Bloodletting Press, spring 2004
- "Donald Meets Arnold" (ss) Inhuman magazine #2, winter 2005
- "Dwindle Light, The" (ss) Perdition Press 0
- "East Side Morning, 1896" (pm) Devil's Wine, Cemetery Dance, 2004
- "Fear Report, The" (ss) The Blood Review Apr 1990
- "Fire" (ss) Darkness on the Edge: Tales Inspired by the Songs of Bruce Springsteen, ed. Harrison Howe, PS Publishing 2010
- "Fisherman Joe" (ss) Thunder’s Shadow Collector’s Magazine Aug 1995
- "Fixtures of Matchstick Men and Joo" (nv) Millennium, ed. Douglas E. Winter, 1997
- "Flip Flap" (ss) ChiZine #16, Spring 2003, Shivers III, Cemetery Dance, 2005
- "For the Holidays" (pm) Grue #11 1990
- "Forever, Amen" (nv) The Mammoth Book of Vampire Stories by Women, ed. Stephen Jones, 2001
- "Frozen Orchard" (pm) Devil's Wine, Cemetery Dance, 2004
- "Give to Me Your Leather" (ss) The Drive-In: Multiplex , Thunderstorm Books, 2023
- "Hike" (pm) Devil's Wine, Cemetery Dance, 2004
- "Honey Girls On Line" (ss) Shadow Dreams, Silver Salamander Press, 1996
- "Hooked on Buzzer" (ss) Women of Darkness, ed. Kathryn Ptacek, Tor 1988, Splatterpunks II: Over the Edge, ed. Paul M. Sammon, Tor 1995
- "Hot Orgy of the Caged Virgins" (ss) Iniquities, Spr 1991, Quick Chills II, ed. Robert Morrish & Peter Enfantino, Deadline Press 1992
- "I Am Not My Smell" (ss) Expressions of Dread, 1994
- "I Have a Little Shadow" (ss) Imagination Fully Dilated, ed. Alan M. Clark & Elizabeth Engstrom, CD Publications 1998
- "In the Cow Pasture" (ss) Argonaut #13, 1987
- "Ice Dreams" (with Robert Petitt) (ss) Darkside, ed. John Pelan, Darkside Press 1996
- "Journal of a Headhunter" (ss) Sycophant #3, 1987
- "Keeping the Peace" (ss) Freedom of Screech, 2019
- "Landlock, The" (co-authored with Erin Massie) (ss) Dream Science Fiction, 1989, Summer Chills, Barnes & Noble, 2007
- "Learning to Give" (ss) Bizarre Bazaar #3 1994
- "Lock Her Room" (ss) Dead End: City Limits, ed. Paul F. Olson & David B. Silva, St. Martin's 1991, Bizarre Bazaar #2 1993
- "Los Penitentes" (ss) Exotic Gothic 2, ed. Danel Olson, Ash-Tree Press, 2008
- "M Is for the Many Things" (ss) A Whisper of Blood, ed. Ellen Datlow, Morrow 1991
- "Mansion of Mysteries" (ss) Dementia #1 1986
- "Meat" (ss) The Tome, 1991
- "Merry Music of Madness, The" (with Brian Massie) (ss) Great Writers & Kids Write Spooky Stories, ed. Martin H. Greenberg, Jill M. Morgan & Robert Weinberg, Random House 1995
- "The Metamorphosis of a Poet" (ss) Chrysalis, 1972
- "Mr. Potato Head" (ss) The Horror Zine's Book of Ghost Stories, ed. Jeani Rector, Hellbound Books 2020
- "Next Door Collector" (ss) Deadly Housewives, HarperCollins, Spring 2006
- "No Solicitors, Curious a Quarter" (ss) Deathrealm F11/Win 1991
- "Now I'm With the Invalids" (ss) Travel Guide to the Haunted Mid-Atlantic Region, Naked Snake Press, Spring 2006
- "One Two, Buckle My shoe" (ss) Arithmophobia Polymath Press, 2024
- "Pinkie" (ss) Best New Horror 17, 2006, A Little Magenta Book of Mean Stories, Borderlands, 2005
- "Pit Boy" (ss) Outsiders: 22 All-New Stories From the Edge, Roc/NAL, October 2005
- "Pseudofiction" (with Brian Hodge, Jeff Johnston, Andrew Lynch, Yvonne Navarro, Jeffrey Osier, Stephen Mark Rainey, David Niall Wilson & Amy Wimberger)(rr) The Tome Sum 1992
- "Reclamation of Sweeney Todd, The" (ss) After Hours Win 1995
- "Replacement, The" It, Watching, Crossroad Press, 2017
- "Sanctuary of the Shrinking Soul" (ss) Obsessions, ed. Gary Raisor, Dark Harvest 1991
- "Shadow of the Valley" (ss)
- "Show and Hell" (pm) Grue #7 1988
- "Sick’Un" (ss) Bringing Down the Moon, ed. Jani Anderson, Space & Time 1985
- "Sineater" (excerpt) Footsteps #9 1990
- "Sluggish Synapse Blues" (pm) Devil's Wine, Cemetery Dance, 2004
- "Smoothpicks" (ss) Deathrealm F11/Win 1988, Alpha Gallery, ed. Joy Oestreicher, Mark Rich, David Memmott & Charmaine Parsons, SPWAO 1990
- "Snow Day" (ss), Not One of Us Aug 1994
- "Stephen" (winner of the Bram Stoker Award) (nv) Borderlands, ed. Thomas F. Monteleone, Avon 1990, The Year’s Best Fantasy and Horror: Fourth Annual Collection, ed. Ellen Datlow & Terri Windling, St. Martin's 1991, Best New Horror 2, ed. Stephen Jones & Ramsey Campbell, Robinson 1991
- "Stink Hole," Wages of Belief, Crossroad Press, 2021
- "Stinkin’ Rudy" (ss) The Tome #4 1990, Bizarre Bazaar #1 1992
- "Stinky Square Eyes" (pm) Devil's Wine, Cemetery Dance, 2004
- "Sweet Kitty" (ss) Grue #3 1986
- "Tea for Two" (ss) Dark Murmurs, Silent House, 2022
- "Thanks" (vi) Lore #9 1998
- "That Old Timer Rock and Roll" (ss) SPWAO Showcase #8 1992
- "They Came From the Dark Ride" (ss) Kolchak the Night Stalker: Casebook, Moonstone, Jan 2007
- "Those Who are Terrified" (cc) Midnight in the Graveyard, Silver Shamrock, 2019
- "Thundersylum" (ss) The Horror Show Summer 1985, Best of the Horror Show, ed. David B. Silva, 2AM 1987, The Definitive Best of The Horror Show, ed. David B. Silva, CD Publications 1992
- "To Soothe the Savage Beast" (ss) The Horror Show Fll 1987
- "Triptych O' Terror" (pm) Devil's Wine, Cemetery Dance, 2004
- "Tunnel Vision" (ss) Fright Train, Haverhouse Publishing, 2021
- "Virginia Town, 1963" (pm) Devil's Wine, Cemetery Dance, 2004
- "Wal-Martin'" (pm) Devil's Wine, Cemetery Dance, 2004
- "What Happened When Mosby Paulson Had Her Painting Reproduced on the Cover of the Phone Book" (ss) Voices from the Night, ed. John Maclay, Maclay & Associates 1994, The Best New Horror: Volume Six, ed. Stephen Jones, Raven 1995
- "White Hair We Adore" (ss) Shadow Dreams, Silver Salamander Press, 1996
- "Whittler" (ss) The Horror Show Win 1984, Eldritch Tales #16 1988
- "Wills and the Way, The" (ss) The Horror Show Spr 1990
- "Willy Wonka and the L. Walker Biofair" (ss) The Horror Show Fll 1987
- "...You Get What You Need" (rr) Event Horizon Online Nov 1998

=== Buffyverse ===
Novels relating to the fictional universe established by Buffy and Angel:

- Power of Persuasion (Buffy novel)

=== Plays ===
Shenandoah Moon with Duane Hahn and Barbara Spilman Lawson

Mystery of the Meandering Music Box

=== Other works ===
These include historical fiction for young adults/teens and middle grade readers:

- Young Founders, 1609: Winter of the Dead (Tor, 2000, reissue 2007)
- Young Founders, 1776: Son of Liberty (Tor, 2000, reissue 2007)
- Young Founders, 1863: A House Divided (Tor, 2000, reissue 2007)
- Young Founders, 1870: Not With Our Blood (Tor, 2000, reissue 2007)
- The Great Chicago Fire: 1871 (Pocket Books, 1999)
- Daughter of Liberty: Patsy's Discovery (Pocket Books, 1997)
- Daughter of Liberty: Patsy and the Declaration (Pocket Books, 1997)
- Daughter of Liberty: Barbara's Escape (Pocket Books, 1997)

== Awards ==
Bram Stoker Award:

1990: (Long Fiction) - Stephen - Won

1992: (First Novel) - Sineater - Won

1996: (Fiction Collection) - Shadow Dreams - Nominated

2022: Lifetime Achievement winner

Scribe Awards:

2009: (Best Novel - Adapted) - The Tudors: King Takes Queen - Nominated

2010: (Best Adaptation - General & Speculative) - The Tudors: Thy Will Be Done - Won

Locus Award:

1991: (Novelette) - Stephen - Nominated

World Fantasy Award:

1991: (Short Fiction) - Stephen - Nominated

FantLab's Book of the Year Award:

2014: (Online Publication in Small Form) - Abed - Nominated
