= Among the Missing =

Among the Missing may refer to:

- Among the Missing (Richard Laymon), a 1999 novel by Richard Laymon
- Among the Missing, a 2001 collection of short-stories by Dan Chaon
- Among the Missing (film), a 1934 drama starring Richard Cromwell
