= The Beast House =

Novel by Richard Laymon

- First edition (UK)
- Author: Richard Laymon
- Language: English
- Genre: Horror
- Publisher: New English Library
- Publication date: 1986 (Re-released in 1994)
- Publication place: United States
- Media type: Print (hardback & paperback)
- ISBN: 0-7472-4781-1
- OCLC: 31519225
- Preceded by: The Cellar
- Followed by: The Midnight Tour

The Beast House is a 1986 horror novel by American author Richard Laymon. It is the first sequel to Laymon's 1980 novel The Cellar.

== Plot summary ==
Teenager Janice Crogan finds a diary belonging to a previous owner of Beast House, a local tourist attraction in the girl's hometown of Malcasa Point, where numerous gruesome murders have allegedly taken place. The journal features lurid sex scenes between the beast and its author, the house's prior owner. Janice sends an excerpt from the book to famed (fictitious) author Gorman Hardy, who decides to travel to Malcasa Point, along with an accomplice named Brian Blake, in order to steal the book and publish it himself.

Meanwhile, Tyler and Nora, two young women on vacation together, decide to track down an old flame of Tyler's, Dan Jenson, who is now a patrolman living in Malcasa Point. On the way there, they run into Jack and Abe, two ex-Marines who save them from a crazed driver with a serious case of road rage.

Back in town, Gorman agrees to Janice's proposal that she get half the profits from Gorman's proposed book based on the journal, then sends her off with Blake to take photos of Beast House so that he can break into Janice's room at the local inn (run by her parents) and steal the contract entitling her to half the money. While Gorman commits his act of attempted burglary, Blake and Janice are in the woods behind Beast House having sex, but then the beast attacks, kills Blake, and kidnaps Janice.

A bit later, Janice's parents confront Gorman and demand to know their daughter's whereabouts. The three set out for Beast House, eventually discovering Blake's mutilated body, and Janice's father attacks Gorman, who in turn murders both Janice's father and mother, hoping their deaths will also be attributed to the beast.

Meanwhile, Tyler and Nora are told by a neighbor that Dan Jenson can be found at Beast House. They encounter Gorman Hardy while on the Beast House tour, where Tyler is horrified to discover that Dan is one of the beast's previous victims. No longer hindered, she starts a relationship with Abe.

Back at the inn, Gorman offers Jack and Abe a thousand dollars to explore Beast House and get photographs. Breaking into the house, Abe and Jack eventually discover a tunnel connecting Beast House to the home of Maggie Kutch, the tourist trap's current owner, the woman who runs the tours of Beast House.

Janice awakens and realizes she's been raped by the beast, and encounters Sandy and Donna, the mother and daughter survivors from The Cellar, who've been subjected to similar treatment. Jack and Abe kill one of the beasts, and another one kills Gorman, who came to the house with Tyler and Nora. Maggie Kutch is killed and Janice and Donna are rescued, but Sandy disappears.

Some time later, Tyler and Abe are apparently married, with a child, and living at a hotel owned by Abe's father. Janice Crogan has written a bestselling book about her experiences at Beast House. Sandy's whereabouts are still unknown.

== Limited edition ==
In 1998, Cemetery Dance Publications printed two limited edition hardcover versions of The Beast House under ISBN 1-881475-39-5. It featured new art by Alan M. Clark, and it features signatures from Richard Laymon, and Alan M. Clark. The two editions were:

- Limited Edition - 400 signed and numbered copies
- Traycased Lettered Edition - 26 signed and lettered copies
