= The Olympian =

Newspaper in Olympia, Washington, US

- The July 27, 2005 front page of The Olympian
- Type: Daily newspaper
- Format: Broadsheet
- Owner: The McClatchy Company
- Founder: John Miller Murphy
- Founded: 1860 (as The Washington Standard)
- Language: English
- Headquarters: 400 Union Ave. SE, Suite 200; Olympia, WA 98501; United States
- Circulation: 13,153 Daily; 15,454 Sunday (as of 2020)
- ISSN: 0746-7575
- OCLC number: 10253415
- Website: theolympian.com

The Olympian is a daily newspaper based in Olympia, Washington, in the United States. It is owned by The McClatchy Company.

== History ==
Olympia was home to the first newspaper to be published in modern-day Washington, The Columbian (unrelated to the modern publication), which published its first edition on September 11, 1852. John Miller Murphy founded The Washington Standard, a weekly morning paper in Olympia, and published its first issue on November 17, 1860. Murphy launched a daily afternoon paper on February 16, 1889, called the Evening Olympian. It was funded by local businessman with real estate interests and ceased after six or eight months.

On May 1, 1890, Major Clarence M. Barton founded another daily in Olympia called The Daily Tribune. On March 15, 1891, the Morning Olympian was founded as a rival. Its editors were John A. Rea and C.R. Carroll. W.N. Harris soon acquired an interest along with Governor Elisha P. Ferry. Thomas Henderson Boyd bought the Morning Olympian in December 1891. A year later his wife Ursula Junita Unfug, also known as Gypsy Ashton, fatally shot Boyd. Unfug claimed self-defense and a jury acquitted her of all charges. After Boyd's death, Ed Cowan edited the Morning Olympian.

On March 7, 1893, J. O'B. Scobey, George W. Hopp and H.A. McBride acquired the paper, also called The Daily Olympian, from Boyd's estate. A month later they bought the Evening Tribune from J.W. Robinson and merged the two to form the Olympian-Tribune. Scobey sold his controlling interest to S.A. Madge in 1896 but continued to manage the paper's editorial policy. The paper's name eventually reverted to The Daily Olympian. In 1901, a rival paper called The Daily Recorder was established in Olympia. A year later Sidney A. Perkins acquired it. In 1903, Perkins purchased an office building for the Recorder, making it the first daily paper on the Puget Sound to own its own headquarters.

In November 1904, H. D. Crawford and Charles F. Cork, who had recently acquired the Aberdeen Bulletin from Perkins, purchased The Daily Olympian. In August 1905, their partnership ended, with Crawford taking full control of The Daily Olympian and Cork becoming the sole proprietor and editor of the Bulletin. In September 1905, Crawford sold the paper to David King and Charles M. Hartwell. A year later Hartwell sued former owner Crawford for fraud, alleging his real name was George Farner and that he had misrepresented the value of the business. Crawford lost the $2,500 lawsuit. In 1906, Perkins acquired The Daily Olympian. R.T. Buchanan, a political writer at the Indianapolis News was named editor. Crawford stayed on as business manager.

In 1912, Murphy retired after publishing the Washington Standard for 51 years and sold it to a company led by Eagle Freshwater. C.W. Brown bought a half-interest in 1914. Around 1919, Freshwater sold the Standard printing plant around to J.M. Tadlock, who started a new daily and continued the Standard as a weekly. In June 1921, Tadlock turned over the business to a worker cooperative. Freshwater foreclosed on the mortgage that September and the Standard ceased publication.

Perkins merged The Daily Recorder into The Daily Olympian in September 1927. He published the paper until his death at age 90 in 1955. Federated Publications bought The Bellingham Herald and The Daily Olympian from the Perkins Press company in 1967, and merged with the Gannett Corporation in 1971. The paper's name was shortened to The Olympian in 1982. In September 2005, The Olympian was traded by Gannett along with The Bellingham Herald and Idaho Statesman, to Knight Ridder in exchange for the Detroit Free Press and Tallahassee Democrat. In 2006, Knight Ridder was acquired by The McClatchy Company.

In June 2017, The Olympian announced that it would move to an office in downtown Olympia, on the corner of Legion Way and Franklin Street. In 2019, printing of the paper was moved to the press of The Columbian in Vancouver, Washington. Before that, it had been printed for many years in Tacoma on a press originally part of The News Tribune. The age of that press made it too costly to maintain. Starting on Jan. 25, 2020, The Olympian ceased producing a printed newspaper on Saturdays and replaced it with expanded newspapers on Fridays and Sundays. In July 2023, The Olympian switched from delivering physical papers by local carrier to using the U.S. Mail. In March 2024, the paper announced it would decrease the number of print editions to three a week starting May 6.

=== Olympics trademark dispute ===
McClatchy submitted a trademark application for The Olympian in 2006, which was disputed by the United States Olympic Committee under the terms of the Amateur Sports Act of 1978, amended in 1998, which gives the USOC exclusive control of various names derived from the name "Olympic Games". But the 1998 law makes an exception to protect businesses and services in Washington state that were not named for the Olympic Games, but rather the geographic locations sharing the name. The United States Patent and Trademark Office granted The Olympian its requested trademark in 2011.

== See also ==
- History of Olympia
