= Blood Games =

Blood Games may refer to:

- Blood Games (film), 1990 slasher film directed by Tanya Rosenberg
- Blood Games (Bledsoe book), 1992 true crime book by Jerry Bledsoe
- Blood Games (novel) 1992 horror novel by Richard Laymon
