= Dreadful Tales =

Short story collection by Richard Laymon

- Author: Richard Laymon
- Language: English
- Genre: Horror fiction
- Published: 2000
- Publication place: United States
- Media type: Print (Hardcover, Paperback)
- Pages: 436
- Preceded by: Fiends
- Followed by: Madman Stan and Other Stories

Dreadful Tales (2000) is a collection of short horror stories by American cult writer Richard Laymon. Published the year before his death it collects twenty-five stories, most previously published in magazines.

== Stories (in order of arrangement) ==
1. Invitation to Murder
2. The Grab
3. Saving Grace
4. Barney's Bigfoot Museum
5. Herman
6. The Champion
7. The Maiden
8. A Good Cigar is a Smoke
9. I'm not a Criminal
10. Oscar's Audition
11. Into the Pit
12. Spooked
13. The Good Deed
14. The Direct Approach
15. Good Vibrations
16. Phil the Vampire
17. Paying Joe Back
18. The Fur Coat
19. Blarney
20. Dracuson's Driver
21. Roadside Pickup
22. Wishbone
23. First Date
24. Stickman
25. Mop Up

== Reception ==
The collection received positive notices from the horror community, including Shivers, which said that it "knocks all other offerings for six and presents a consistent collection of tales, almost every one of which manages to shock, delight and horrify through numerous ideas, characters and situations... a breath of fresh air in the stale UK Horror climate... Gets my vote as the best of 2000 by a long chalk." (Although Laymon was an American writer, throughout his career his books were more popular in the United Kingdom, a fact he blamed on a botched, heavily edited American release of his second novel, The Woods Are Dark.) Books Magazine called it a "terrifying collection of short stories that showcases the dark genius of a true master of the macabre."
