= Darkness, Tell Us =

1991 novel by Richard Laymon

- First Edition cover
- Author: Richard Laymon
- Cover artist: Mark Taylor
- Language: English
- Genre: Horror
- Publisher: Feature
- Publication date: 1991
- Publication place: United States
- Media type: Print (Hardback & Paperback)
- Pages: 512
- ISBN: 0-7472-3665-8
- OCLC: 24848595
- Preceded by: Island
- Followed by: Blood Games

Darkness, Tell Us is a 1991 horror novel by American writer Richard Laymon. Originally published by Headline Features, it is currently available in a paperback edition from Leisure Fiction.

== Plot summary ==
While attending a party thrown by one of their English professors, six college students use a Ouija board to contact a spirit that identifies itself only as 'Butler'. Butler promises the six a treasure if they will go to a remote mountain location called Calamity Peak. The professor, who knows from experience that messing around with the supernatural can be dangerous, attempts to dissuade them, but the kids steal the board and set off for the mountain anyway. Once they arrive they are menaced by a machete-wielding killer, and soon begin to wonder if Butler might be trying to harm them.

== Content ==
The book contains supernatural elements alongside the more realistic horrors common to Laymon's work (including homicidal maniacs, rape, and childhood sexual abuse).
