= Scobey (disambiguation) =

Scobey is a city in the U.S. state of Montana.

Scobey may also refer to:

- Scobey, Mississippi
- Scobey (soil), named after Scobey, Montana
- Scobey (surname)
