= The Midnight Tour =

1998 novel by Richard Laymon

- First edition cover
- Author: Richard Laymon
- Cover artist: Alan M. Clark
- Language: English
- Genre: Horror
- Publisher: Cemetery Dance Publications
- Publication date: 1998
- Publication place: United States
- Media type: Print (Hardback & Paperback)
- ISBN: 0-7472-5827-9
- OCLC: 44695709
- Preceded by: The Beast House
- Followed by: Friday Night in the Beast House

The Midnight Tour is a 1998 horror novel by American author Richard Laymon, originally released by Feature Publishing. It is the third chapter in the author's "Beast House Chronicles" series, preceded by The Cellar in 1980 and The Beast House in 1986, and followed in 2001 by the posthumously published novella Friday Night in Beast House.

== Plot ==
Seventeen years after the events of The Beast House, the town of Malcasa Point has become a popular tourist destination. The Beast House tours have been updated to include a family-friendly tour during the day and an adult-oriented tour late at night, complete with a screening of a movie inspired by the previous book's events and a tour into the cellar where the first of the beasts resided.

Owen, one of the tourists, is on holiday with his overbearing girlfriend Monica. While touring the Beast House he develops an attraction to Dana, a tour guide. His attraction to Dana compels him to break up with Monica, whose possessiveness has reached breaking point, and he begins stalking Dana. Dana, meanwhile, becomes romantically involved with Warren, the owner of a food stand. Warren tells her that he was recently abducted, taken into the Beast House and sexually abused by something, hinting that maybe there's still one more beast out there...

The story skips back and forth between the present and the in-between years that Sandy, one of the former prisoners of the Kutch family that originally owned the Beast House, has given birth to a beast and raises it in secret. When the beast - whom she has named Eric - turns 13, his sexual urges get the better of him and he rapes Sandy before running away.

As the days go by and the midnight tour approaches, hints of some unknown horror become increasingly prevalent. When the tour goes down into the cellar, they are attacked by a now adult Eric. After killing or maiming several tourists, Sandy arrives and manages to seriously injure Eric. After being treated for their injuries, Dana, Sandy and their friends all spend time together celebrating, only for Eric to show up alive and well and kidnap Dana. Owen finds himself back with Monica against his will.

The epilogue is from Dana's point of view as Eric rapes her. She expresses her fear of what he will do next, only to have an orgasm.

== Limited edition ==
In 1998, Cemetery Dance Publications printed two limited edition hardcover versions of The Midnight Tour under ISBN 1-881475-40-9. It featured new art by Alan M. Clark, and it featured signatures from Richard Laymon, and Alan M. Clark. The two editions were:

- Limited Edition - 1,000 signed and numbered copies
- Traycased Lettered Edition - 52 signed and lettered copies

== Reception ==
Publishers Weekly praised the characters and prose and wrote that the book was "a nightmare ride but plenty of fun for those who like their horror no-frills and nasty."
