= Amasa Clark =

American soldier (1820s–1927)

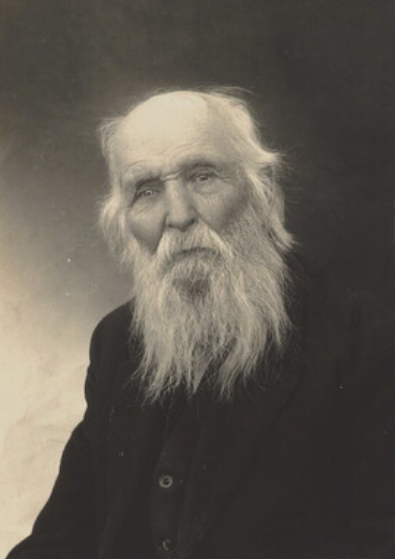
- 1922 portrait of Clark by Noah Hamilton Rose
- Born: Amasa Gleason Clark; September 3, 1825 (or 1828); Schoharie Creek, Schoharie County, New York, US
- Died: January 28, 1927 (aged 101) (or 98); Bandera County, Texas, US
- Burial place: Amasa Clark Family Cemetery
- Children: 19
- Military career
- Allegiance: United States
- Branch: United States Army
- Service years: 1847–1852
- Unit: 3rd Infantry Regiment
- War: Mexican–American War; Siege of Veracruz; Battle of Cerro Gordo; Battle of Contreras; Battle of Churubusco; Battle of Chapultepec

Amasa Gleason Clark (September 3, 1825 (or 1828) – January 28, 1927) was an American soldier.

== Biography ==
Clark was born on September 3, 1825 or 1828, on the Schoharie Creek in Schoharie County, New York. In January 1847, during the Mexican–American War, he enlisted to Company I of the 3rd Infantry Regiment for five years, and was fighting by February or early March. He served under David E. Twiggs in the Siege of Veracruz and the Battle of Cerro Gordo. By the time the regiment reached Puebla, Clark became ill, later recovering then fighting in the Battles of Contreras, Churubusco and Chapultepec.

Though Clark chose to enlist for the duration of the war, he was erroneously entered for five years, thus serving until 1852. Afterwards, he settled in Bandera County, Texas. There, he operated a farm and had 19 children between 2 wives. He was a member of the Veterans of Foreign Wars and the Pioneer Freighters Association. In his later life, Clark was relatively healthy for his age, having never smoked or drank alcohol. He was one of the last surviving veterans of the Mexican–American War, behind Owen Thomas Edgar. He died on January 28, 1927, aged 98 or 101, of illness, and was buried at the Amasa Clark Family Cemetery, which had a placard erected in 1990 by the Texas Historical Commission. A placard in Bandera honors him.
