= Savage (novel) =

1993 novel by Richard Laymon

Savage: From Whitechapel to the Wild West on the Track of Jack the Ripper
- First edition
- Author: Richard Laymon
- Cover artist: Steve Crisp
- Language: English
- Genre: Horror
- Published: 1993
- Publisher: Headline
- Publication place: USA
- Pages: 352

Savage: From Whitechapel to the Wild West on the Track of Jack the Ripper is a 1993 historical fiction horror novel by Richard Laymon. It begins with Jack the Ripper's final, gruesome killing of Mary Jane Kelly, and a young boy who is concealed under the bed during the attack. The boy then tracks the killer to the New World, first to New York and then to the American West.
