= The Traveling Vampire Show =

2000 novel by Richard Laymon

The Travelling Vampire Show
- First edition
- Author: Richard Laymon
- Cover artist: Alan M. Clark
- Language: English
- Genre: Horror, Vampires, Coming of age
- Published: May 2000 Cemetery Dance Publications
- Publication place: United States
- Media type: Print (Hardcover, Paperback)
- Pages: 534
- ISBN: 978-1-58767-000-8
- OCLC: 44409667

The Travelling Vampire Show is a 2000 horror novel by American author Richard Laymon.

== Plot ==
The book follows three 16-year-olds on an idle summer day in 1963. The narrator, Dwight, and his best friends Rusty and Slim (a tomboy), find flyers for an exotic vampire show. They make a journey to a local clearing called Jank's Field in an attempt to sneak a peek at Valeria, who is billed as the world's only living captive vampire, but they are attacked by a dog and separated, leading to a series of misadventures. Meanwhile, Dwight's attractive sister-in-law Lee purchases four tickets from the show's frontman, Julian Stryker. Later that night the group is reunited and attends the titular Vampire Show, where they discover a sinister plot involving the vampires.

The book focuses on the interactions between the three teens and their sexual awakening.

== Publication ==
The first run of the book included two special limited editions. A signed limited edition hardcover (1000 copies) had the same production values as the hardcover and included a signature sheet. The traycased lettered edition (26 copies) was signed and lettered, and bound in leather with a satin ribbon page marker and additional full-color artwork. Lettered, limited editions are marked A-Z instead of numerically, and limited to 26 copies. Each book was enclosed in a traycase, a clam shell construction which completely encased the book, a key feature which separates lettered editions from numbered editions.

== Reception ==
The book was one of Laymon's more popular novels and won a posthumous Bram Stoker Award for best novel in 2001. A starred review from Publishers Weekly praised the novel for its "emphasis on atmosphere" specifically pointing out the social and sexual tensions among the three teens.
