= Blood Games (novel) =

1992 novel by Richard Laymon

- First Edition Cover
- Author: Richard Laymon
- Cover artist: Steve Crisp
- Language: English
- Genre: Horror
- Publisher: Headline Books
- Publication date: 5 March 1992
- Publication place: United States
- Media type: Print (hardback & paperback)
- ISBN: 0-7472-3821-9
- OCLC: 26299418
- Preceded by: Darkness, Tell Us
- Followed by: Alarums

Blood Games is a 1992 horror novel by American author Richard Laymon.

== Synopsis ==
The novel centres on a group of young women who have been best friends since college. They go on their annual vacation together, each year to a different location of one member of the group's choosing. This year's trip takes them to the Totem Pole Lodge, an abandoned resort that was allegedly the site of a gruesome mass murder twelve years earlier. When one of the women, Helen, mysteriously disappears, her friends begin a search of the resort and the surrounding wilderness in an effort to discover what happened to her.

== Structure ==
The novel employs a flashback structure alternating between present-day events at the resort and the group's experiences together in college, beginning when the girls met during their freshman year and proceeding through their graduation and three previous reunions. The story is told from the point of view of one of the women, Abilene, but focuses mainly on her four friends: tough, confrontational Cora, tomboyish Finley (the practical joker), fashion model Vivian, and timid, insecure Helen, whose disappearance and eventual fate are foreshadowed by a frightening experience in a dormitory restroom during her freshman year.

== Connections with Laymon's other works ==
The bulk of the novel's flashbacks takes place at Belmore University, a fictional liberal arts college referenced in several of Laymon's novels (and based largely on his own experiences at Willamette University in Oregon). In addition, one of the girls quotes a passage from "Ulalume", a poem by Edgar Allan Poe, which was also the basis of Laymon's 2001 novel Night in the Lonesome October.

== Reception ==
Publishers Weekly described Blood Games as "middling", like "so much of [Laymon's] mid-career work". The review concluded by saying that it is a "brisk but routine entertainment from the controversial author".
