= Scobey (surname) =

Scobey is a surname. Notable people with the surname include:

- Bob Scobey (1916–1963), American jazz musician
- Frank Edgar Scobey (1866–1931), director of the United States Mint
- J. O'B. Scobey (1854–1910), American politician
- Josh Scobey (born 1979), American football player
- Margaret Scobey (born c. 1949), American diplomat
