= Night in the Lonesome October =

2001 novel by Richard Laymon

- Author: Richard Laymon
- Language: English
- Genre: Horror
- Published: 2001
- Publisher: Feature
- Publication place: United States
- Media type: Print (hardback & paperback)
- Pages: 480
- Preceded by: Friday Night in Beast House
- Followed by: The Halloween Mouse

Night in the Lonesome October (2001) is a horror novel by the American author Richard Laymon. Released in October 2001, it was one of several books in the author's catalogue published posthumously, following his death in February of the same year. The title is a reference to the Edgar Allan Poe poem "Ulalume".

== Plot introduction ==
Ed Logan is a 20-year-old student at Wilmington University. His girlfriend has dumped him, and feeling dejected he goes on a late-night walk to a doughnut shop. As the long October night drags on, he finds his odyssey disturbed by numerous odd encounters with street violence, sexual predation, and homelessness.

== Style ==
In terms of genre, like a lot of Laymon's work, Night in the Lonesome October is closer to crime than supernatural horror. Laymon is most often associated with "splatterpunk", a subgenre of horror fiction that came about in the 1980s and focuses on extreme and transgressive material. Laymon in particular was known for the presence of sexual violence in his stories, although Night and some of his other later books are notably more muted in this respect.

== Reception ==
Along with The Traveling Vampire Show, Night in the Lonesome October is often considered to be one of Laymon's best novels and a sign of an improved phase of his writing following a creative decline in the late 1990s. Publishers Weekly referred to it as "one of the eeriest, and one of [the] most immediate, horror novels of recent decades", before lamenting the loss of one of horror fiction's "rarest talents." Charles De Lint of F&SF wrote that while the book is "written in a plain, simple prose", it will "prove to have surprising layers" the "further into the book one reads".
