= The Woods Are Dark =

1981 novel by Richard Laymon

The Woods are Dark
- First edition
- Author: Richard Laymon
- Language: English
- Genre: Horror fiction
- Published: 1981
- Publisher: Warner Books
- Publication place: United States
- Media type: Print (Hardcover, Paperback)

The Woods Are Dark is a 1981 horror novel by American author Richard Laymon. It was one of his earliest published works, and one he credited with having all but destroyed his publishing career in the United States.

An uncut version of the novel was released by Cemetery Dance Publications in July 2008. It includes fifty pages of material that was cut from the original Warner Books release, and was later found by Kelly Laymon among some of her father's old papers, along with the full original manuscript (which was extensively edited by Warner for its initial publication). This creative interference, together with the original publication's disastrous cover artwork, is what Laymon often credited with having ruined his first promising U.S. publishing career.

== Synopsis ==
The plot concerns two groups of people, a family and a pair of college students, who are kidnapped after stopping in a small California town and taken into the forest to be sacrificed to a group of mysterious creatures, called "Krulls", who roam the surrounding wilderness. The identity of the Krulls, and their relationship to the town of Barlow, are revealed gradually over the course of the novel.

== Extended edition ==
Cemetery Dance Publications will release two different versions of their 2008 restored and uncut edition of The Woods are Dark.

- Trade Hardcover Edition - ISBN 978-1-58767-197-5
- Traycased Lettered Edition - 52 lettered copies with a bookplate signed by Laymon before his death, bound in leather, and additional artwork by Alan M. Clark.
