= Fran Friel =

American author of horror fiction

Fran Friel is an American author of horror fiction who resides in the Monterey Bay area.

Mama's Boy, Friel's debut novella, was a finalist in the category of Long Fiction for the 2007 Bram Stoker Award. This honor has been previously held by the likes of Stephen King, Kelly Link, and Joe Hill, among others.

Friel writes a weekly column for The Horror Library Blog-O-Rama, as well as Yada, Too, and is a former fiction editor for Dark Recesses Press.

Friel’s work has been featured in the 2006 anthology release, Horror Library Volume One, as well as publications in a number of other outlets including: The Horror Library, Insidious Reflections, Wicked Karnival, The Lightning Journal, Lamoille Lamentations, The Eldritch Gazette, Tiny Terrors 2, Apex Digest and Dark Recesses Press.

Mama's Boy and Other Dark Tales, a collection of Friel's short stories, included the Stoker nominated "Mama's Boy" was released by Apex Book Company in the Summer of 2008. At present, the author is at work on her first novel project.

== Bibliography ==
- "Wings with Hot Sauce" (Short Story, Appeared in Horror Library Volume I) – (Cutting Block Press, 2005)
- "Mama's Boy" (Novella) – (Insidious Publications, 2006)
- Mama's Boy and Other Dark Tales (Collection) --- (Apex Book Company, 2008)
