= Island (Laymon novel) =

1995 novel by Richard Laymon

- First edition cover
- Author: Richard Laymon
- Cover artist: Steve Crisp
- Language: English
- Genre: Thriller novel
- Publisher: Headline
- Publication date: 1995
- Publication place: United States
- Media type: Print (Hardback & Paperback)
- ISBN: 0-8439-4978-3
- OCLC: 49334915
- Preceded by: Quake
- Followed by: Body Rides

Island is a thriller novel by American author Richard Laymon, originally published in 1995 by Headline Features. It was reissued in 2002 by Leisure Publishing, with new cover artwork and a foreword by popular suspense novelist Dean Koontz.

== Synopsis ==
The novel is structured as a series of journal entries made by Rupert, a young man who finds himself stranded on an island in the Bahamas (along with six other people) when their yacht mysteriously explodes. After an ax-wielding maniac claims the lives of two of the castaways, Rupert and the other survivors are forced to try to outwit the mysterious killer to save their lives.

Since the concept of the novel is that Rupert is making his journal entries as events happen (with no knowledge as to how future developments in the "plot" will unfold), the reader is left uncertain as to whether any of the book's characters, including Rupert himself, will survive (unlike most first-person narratives, where the survival of the narrator, at least, tends to be a foregone conclusion). The novel plays with these expectations at several points, with Rupert's life constantly in danger right alongside those of his compatriots.

Eventually, the women are captured along with the others. Rupert manages to kill the antagonists, one of whom informs him where the prison cells' key is. Rupert informs the prisoners that the key is missing and starts a sexual relationship with his girlfriend's mother. He feeds the women and keeps them as comfortable as possible, and he tells them via his journal that one day he may even decide to check the key's location.

== Comparisons to Laymon's other works ==
The book contains many similarities to Laymon's other novels, including surprising (and often outlandish) plot twists, a sexually depraved villain, portrayal of the heroines as beautiful, strong, and almost Amazonian in stature (despite also being depicted as vulnerable and scantily clad throughout much of the proceedings), and first and foremost, the characterization of Rupert, the protagonist and supposed "hero", who nonetheless displays lecherous tendencies and attitudes which may not be far removed from those of the book's villain.
