= Richard Laymon =

American writer (1947–2001)

Richard Carl Laymon
- Born: January 14, 1947; Chicago, Illinois, U.S
- Died: February 14, 2001 (aged 54); Los Angeles, California, U.S
- Occupation: Novelist
- Writing career
- Genre: Horror
- Notable works: The Cellar, The Beast House, The Midnight Tour, Island, The Traveling Vampire Show

Richard Carl Laymon (January 14, 1947 – February 14, 2001) was an American author of suspense and horror fiction, particularly within the splatterpunk subgenre.

== Life and career ==
Laymon was born and raised outside of Chicago, Illinois, then lived in Tiburon, California, as a teen. He graduated from Redwood High School, then pursued a BA in English Literature from Willamette University in Oregon and an MA in English Literature from Loyola University in Los Angeles.

His works include more than sixty short stories and more than thirty novels, a few of which were published under the pseudonym Richard Kelly. Additionally he published as Carl Laymon for his young adult novels, Carla Laymon for a romance, and Lee Davis Willoughby for his western The Lawmen. Twenty of his stories were published as part of the Fastback Mystery series—single short stories released in book form.

Laymon was editor of The Executioner Myster Magazine and The 87th Precinct Mystery Magazine. He also worked as a high school English teacher and worked in the Mount St. Mary's College library. He was the regional director for the Los Angeles chapter Mystery Writers of America from 1977 to 1979.

Early in his career, Laymon found greater commercial success in the United Kingdom and Europe, despite praise from prominent writers from within the genre, including Stephen King and Dean Koontz. Laymon believed that this was a result of a badly edited first release of The Woods Are Dark, which had had over fifty pages removed. The poor editing and unattractive cover art also stalled his career in America after the success of The Cellar. Starting in 1999 and in association with Leisure Books, Laymon found delayed recognition in his homeland. Laymon's original version of The Woods Are Dark was finally published in July 2008 by Leisure Books and Cemetery Dance Publications after being reconstructed from the original manuscript by his daughter, Kelly.

His novel Flesh was named Best Horror Novel of 1988 by the Science Fiction Chronicle, and both Flesh and Funland were nominated for the Bram Stoker Award, as was his non-fiction work A Writer's Tale. He won this award posthumously in 2001 for The Traveling Vampire Show.

Laymon was president of the Horror Writers Association (2000–2001). The Richard Laymon President's Award was created in his honor. The award is given by the sitting president to a volunteer who has shown extraordinary dedication to HWA.

The tribute anthology, In Laymon's Terms, was released by Cemetery Dance Publications during the summer of 2011. It featured short stories and non-fiction tribute essays by authors such as Bentley Little, Jack Ketchum, Gary Brandner, Edward Lee, and many others.

== Personal life ==
Laymon married Ann Marie Marshall in August 1976. They had one daughter, Kelly. He died in Los Angeles, California of a heart attack in 2001, aged 54.

== Bibliography ==
=== Novels ===
- The Cellar (1980) (First book in the Beast House Chronicles series)
- Your Secret Admirer (1980) (writing as Carl Laymon – young adult novel)
- The Woods Are Dark (1981)
- Out Are the Lights (1982)
- Nightmare Lake (1983) (writing as Carl Laymon – young adult novel)
- The Lawmen (1983) (writing as Lee Davis Willoughby)
- Night Show (1984)
- A Stranger's Arms (1984) (writing as Carla Laymon)
- Beware (1985)
- Allhallow's Eve (1985)
- The Beast House (1986) (Second book in the Beast House Chronicles series)
- Tread Softly (1987) – a.k.a. Dark Mountain (writing as Richard Kelly)
- Flesh (1987)
- Midnight's Lair (1988) (writing as Richard Kelly)
- Resurrection Dreams (1988)
- Funland (1989)
- The Stake (1990)
- One Rainy Night (1991)
- Darkness, Tell Us (1991)
- Alarums (1992) a.k.a. Alarms
- Blood Games (1992)
- Dark Mountain (1993)
- Savage: From Whitechapel to the Wild West on the Track of Jack the Ripper (1993)
- Endless Night (1993)
- In the Dark (1994)
- Quake (1995)
- Island (1995)
- Body Rides (1996)
- Bite (1996)
- After Midnight (1997)
- The Wilds (1998)
- The Midnight Tour (1998) (Third book in the Beast House Chronicles series)
- Cuts (1999)
- Among the Missing (1999)
- Come Out Tonight (1999)
- Once Upon A Halloween (2000)
- The Traveling Vampire Show (2000)
- Friday Night in Beast House (2001) (Fourth book in the Beast House Chronicles series)
- Night in the Lonesome October (2001)
- The Halloween Mouse (with Alan M. Clark) (2001) – children's book
- Triage (2001)
- No Sanctuary (2001)
- Amara (2003) a.k.a. To Wake the Dead
- The Lake (2004)
- The Glory Bus (2005) a.k.a. Into the Fire
- The Woods Are Dark Restored and Uncut (2008)

=== Fastbacks (young adult short stories) ===
- The Intruder (1984)
- Shootout At Joe's (1984) a.k.a Meeting at Joe's
- Dawson's City (1984)
- The Caller (1985)
- Cardiac Arrest (1985)
- The Cobra (1985)
- Guts (1985) a.k.a. The Hearse
- The Last Hand (1985)
- Live Bait (1985)
- The Lonely One (1985)
- The Trap (1985)
- Marathon (1985)
- Night Games (1985)
- Night Ride (1985)
- Beginner's Luck (1986)
- Halloween Hunt (1986)
- The Night Creature (1986)
- The Beast (1986)
- The Return (1987)
- Thin Air (1987)

=== Short stories ===
- "Bad News"
- "Barney's Bigfoot Museum"
- "Bedtime Stories"
- "Blarney"
- "The Bleeder"
- "Boo" (first printed in October Dreams and reprinted in In Laymon's Terms)
- "The Boy Who Loved the Twilight Zone" (included in Be Afraid: Tales of Horror selected by Edo Van Belkom 2000 Tundra Books)
- "Cabin in the Woods" (included in The Children of Cthulhu, edited by John Pelan and Benjamin Adams 2002 Del Ray Books / Ballantine)
- "The Champion"
- "Choppie" (included in Subterranean Gallery, edited by Richard Chizmar and William Schafer 1999 Subterranean Press)
- "Cut!" (Originally appeared in Besteller Magazine #23, Pitman Learning, 1985 and reprinted in In Laymon's Terms)
- "Desert Pickup"
- "Dinker's Pond"
- "The Direct Approach"
- "The Diving Girl" (included in Dark Delicacies: Original Tales of Terror and the Macabre, edited by Del Howison & Jeff Gelb)
- "Double Date"
- "Dracusson's Driver"
- "Eats"
- "Fiends"
- "Finders Keepers" (Originally appeared in Besteller Magazine #26, Pitman Learning, 1985)
- "First Date"
- "The Fur Coat"
- "A Good Cigar is a Smoke"
- "The Good Deed"
- "A Good, Secret Place"
- "Good Vibrations"
- "The Grab"
- "Hammerhead" (included in The Horror Writers Association Presents – The Museum of Horror, edited by Dennis Etchison 2003 Leisure Books)
- "The Hangman" (included in Skull Full of Spurs: A Roundup of Weird Westerns, edited by Jason Bovberg and Kirk Whitham 2000 Dark Highway Press)
- "Herman"
- "The Hunt" (also made in to an extended screenplay titled The Hunted and included in Screamplays – published by Del Ray 1997)
- "I'm Not a Criminal"
- "Immediate Opening" (reprinted in In Laymon's Terms)
- "In The Attic" (released as a chapbook – published by Camelot Books)
- "Into the Pit"
- "Invitation to Murder"
- "The Job" (included in The Unexplained – Stories of the Paranormal, edited by Ric Alexander, introduced by Peter James 1998 Millenium)
- "Joyce"
- "The Keeper" (released as a chapbook – published by Gauntlet Publications)
- "Keeper of the Books" (Originally appeared in California School Libraries (volume 48 issue 3) Spring 1977)
- "Kitty Litter"
- "The Living Dead" (included in Mondo Zombie, edited by John Skipp 2006 Cemetery Dance Publications)
- "Madman Stan"
- "The Maiden"
- "The Mask"
- "The Mirror" (included in Discoveries: Best of Horror and Dark Fantasy, edited by James R. Beach and Jason V. Brock, 2018)
- "Mess Hall"
- "Mop Up"
- "Oscar's Audition"
- "Out of the Woods"
- "Paying Joe Back"
- "Phil the Vampire"
- "Pickup on Highway One"
- "Prudence" (included in Imagination Fully Dilated 2, edited by Elizabeth Engstrom, artwork by Alan M. Clarke, 2000)
- "Roadside Pickup"
- "Saving Grace"
- "Slit"
- "Special"
- "Spooked"
- "Stickman"
- "Stiff Intruders"
- "Tell Me A Tale" (released as a chapbook – published by Cemetery Dance)
- "Ten Bucks Says You Won't" (included in The Darker Side – Generations of Horror, edited by John Pelan 2002 ROC Horror)
- "The Tub"
- "What Jimmy Saw" (first printed in Los Angeles Times Halloween 1998 – 25 October 1998, also found at https://rlk.stevegerlach.com/rlnews98.htm)
- "Wishbone"
- "The Worshipper"

=== Collections ===
- Out Are the Lights: And Other Tales (1991) (includes: Out are the Lights | Mess Hall | Dinker's Pond | Madman Stan | Bad News | The Tub)
- A Good, Secret Place (1992) (includes: Desert Pickup | Roadside Pickup | Oscar's Audition | Paying Joe Back | Out of the Woods | A Good Cigar is a Smoke | The Direct Approach | The Champion | Stiff Intruders | Barney's Bigfoot Museum | Blarney | Spooked | The Grab | Eats | The Bleeder | The Good Deed | Joyce | Stickman | The Mask | A Good Secret Place)
- Fiends (1997) (includes: Fiends | Kitty Litter | The Bleeder | Desert Pickup | The Mask | Eats | The Hunt | Slit | Out of the Woods | Stiff Intruders | Special | Joyce | A Good, Secret Place)
- Dreadful Tales (2000) (includes: Invitation to Murder | The Grab | Saving Grace | Barney's Bigfoot Museum | Herman | The Champion | The Maiden | A Good Cigar is a Smoke | I'm Not a Criminal | Oscar's Audition | Into the Pit | Spooked | The Good Deed | The Direct Approach | Good Vibrations | Phil the Vampire | Paying Joe Back | The Fur Coat | Blarney | Dracuson's Driver | Roadside Pickup | Wishbone | First Date | Stickman | Mop Up)
- Madman Stan and Other Stories (2004) (includes: The Hunt | Eats | The Worshipper | The Maiden | Bedtime Stories | Desert Pickup | A Good Cigar is a Smoke | Invitation to Murder | The Champion | The Good Deed | Paying Joe Back | The Fur Coat | Blarney | A Good, Secret Place | Pickup on Highway One | Saving Grace | Spooked | Madman Stan | Kitty Litter | Slit)
- Short Stories: The Mystery and Men’s Magazines (2014)

=== Anthologies ===
- Bad News Anthology (2000) (includes: the short story Double Date by Richard Laymon and stories from other contributors)

=== Autobiography ===
- A Writer's Tale (1998)

=== Tribute ===
- In Laymon's Terms (2011)

== Awards ==
Year	Award	Category	Work	Result	Ref.
1988	Bram Stoker Award	Novel	Flesh	Nominated	
1990	Bram Stoker Award	Novel	Funland	Nominated	
1993	Bram Stoker Award	Fiction Collection	A Good and Secret Place	Nominated	
1998	Bram Stoker Award	Non-Fiction	A Writer's Tale	Nominated	
1998	International Horror Guild Award	Non-Fiction	A Writer's Tale	Nominated	
2000	Bram Stoker Award	Novel	The Traveling Vampire Show	Won	
2000	Bram Stoker Award	Anthology	Bad News	Nominated	

== See also ==
- List of horror fiction authors
- splatterpunk
