= Midnight's Lair =

1988 novel by Richard Laymon

- First UK edition (publ. W. H. Allen & Co.)
- Author: Richard Laymon
- Language: English
- Publication date: 1988

Midnight's Lair is a 1988 horror novel by American writer Richard Laymon, originally written under the pseudonym Richard Kelly. It was first published in Great Britain and was not released in the United States until 1993, where it was distributed by St. Martin's Press.

== Plot ==
The novel concerns a group of tourists who become trapped in a cavern after a fire destroys the exits. Darcy, one of the tour guides, and the group try to escape by breaking into a part of the cave that had been walled up years before. Among the tourists is Kyle Mordock, son of the hotel owner who has a perverse obsession with Darcy.

When Darcy and the group breach the wall they release a family of cannibalistic savages that has been living in the cave for over half a century. The savages are the descendants of people imprisoned by Kyle's great-grandfather. They were kept alive by being fed the corpses of women Kyle and his father had kidnapped, raped and murdered.

Subplots include Darcy falling in love with one of the tourists, Kyle gaining the trust of a teenage girl with sinister intent and Darcy's mother venturing underground with a ragtag rescue team.
