= Among the Missing (novel) =

1999 crime novel by Richard Laymon

- First edition
- Author: Richard Laymon
- Cover artist: Steve Crisp
- Language: English
- Genre: Thriller, Crime
- Publisher: Headline Publishing Group & Leisure Books
- Publication date: 1999
- Publication place: United States
- Media type: Print (hardback & paperback), Amazon Kindle
- Pages: 320
- ISBN: 978-0-7472-6072-1
- Preceded by: The Wilds 1998 in literature
- Followed by: Come Out Tonight 1999 in literature

Among the Missing is a crime novel by American author Richard Laymon, first published in 1999 by Headline Publishing. The book is a detective story about an investigation into the murder of a woman whose decapitated body is found on a beach.

== Plot summary ==
The novel takes place in Sierra County, California, primarily around the Silver Lake area. The story begins with a man and woman visiting a section of the Silver River referred to as 'the Bend', apparently with the intention of engaging in a romantic tryst. The next day, the woman's decapitated body is discovered by a young couple, Bass and his girlfriend Faye. Sheriff Rusty Hodges and his daughter-in-law, Deputy Mary "Pac" Hodges, are called in to investigate.

The pursuit of the killer leads to a complicated series of events involving Merton (a homosexual drug dealer who was seen running from the scene of the crime), the dead woman's husband, and a revenge scheme involving two of the main characters.

== Adult themes ==
Like many of Laymon's other works, the book features strong adult content. Themes of sex and rape are present.

== Critical reception ==
According to Publishers Weekly: "Outside of [the main character], few characters are worth rooting for, as all of them display despicable qualities. But such flaws make Laymon's one-track story more intriguing and more realistic."
