= Noah Hamilton Rose =

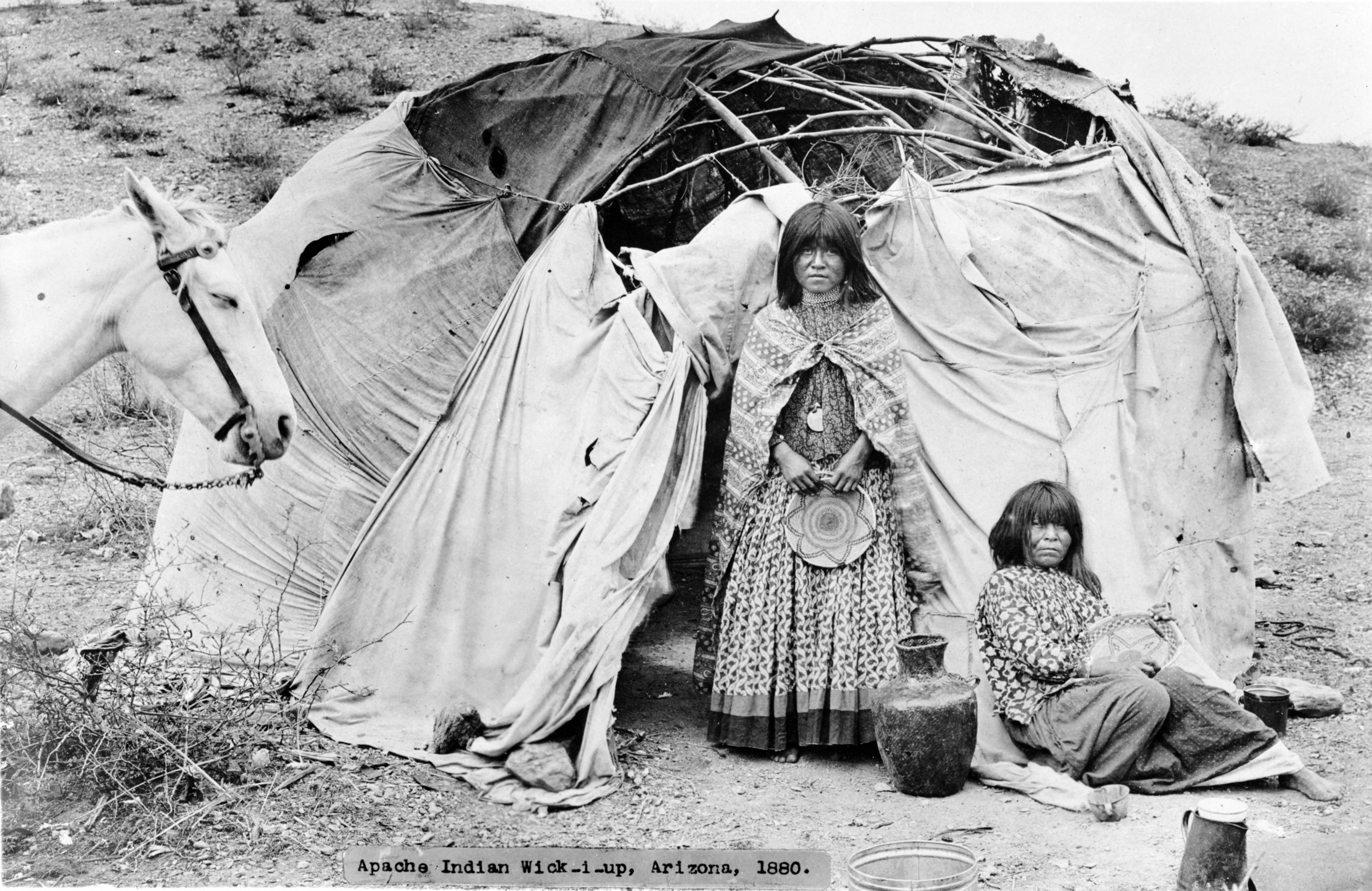
"Apache wikiup, Arizona, 1880." From the photograph collection of N. H. Rose

Noah Hamilton Rose (April 9, 1874 – January 25, 1952) was a painter and photographer. He developed an impressive collection of photographs of the old West that included images of many notable individuals from the era.

== Personal life ==
Rose was born in Kendall County, Texas, the son of Newton C. and Loutilda White. His father was a carpenter. Rose was educated in rural schools. When he was 10, the family moved to Menardville). At age 14 he began working as an apprentice for the Menardville Monitor. His family later moved to Ballinger and Rose got a job with their local paper, but in 1891 at age 17 he returned to work in Menardville for the Record.

== Photography business ==
He taught himself photography using a small box camera and printing supplies that he had earned by selling subscriptions to a popular family weekly, Youth's Companion. In 1892, he left Menardville to work at the Mason Herald. For the next thirty years, he worked as an itinerant printer and photographer in Sonora, Menardville, Eagle Pass, Del Rio and many other small towns in west, central, and northern Texas. He supplemented standard portrait work with news photography of events such as the Menardville flood in June 1899, and the 1902 land rush in Junction.

In 1901, Rose began making lantern slides of his news photographs, often exhibiting them the same day. He specialized in hangings, shootouts, gunmen, sheriffs, politicians, and judges. He began collecting photographs of noted personalities and events and wrote to people such as Emmett Dalton of the Dalton Gang asking for pictures.

== Old West photo collection ==
In 1904, he set up a photography studio in Del Rio and continued adding to his photograph collection. In 1921, Rose moved to San Antonio. He was ill for several months and was later struck by a car, suffering a fractured skull. His illness left him in debt with large medical bills. To pay his debt, he printed a mail-order catalog of the negatives he had collected and developed a successful mail-order business selling photographs to magazines and collectors. His images included pictures of Jesse James, Billy the Kid, Belle Starr, Jim and Bob Younger, and the Dalton gang were well-received, and he also sold pictures of peace officers, Indians, Texas Rangers, and pioneers.

He added to his collection when he purchased the rights to photographs owned by A. A. Brack who owned Brack's Studio in San Antonio. He eventually collected over 2,000 images. He partnered with his childhood friend John Marvin Hunter and published Album of Gunfighters in 1951. He died unexpectedly in San Antonio after a short illness in 1952 and was buried in Roselawn Cemetery.

His photograph collection is now held by the University of Oklahoma in Norman. Other images from his collection are shown below.

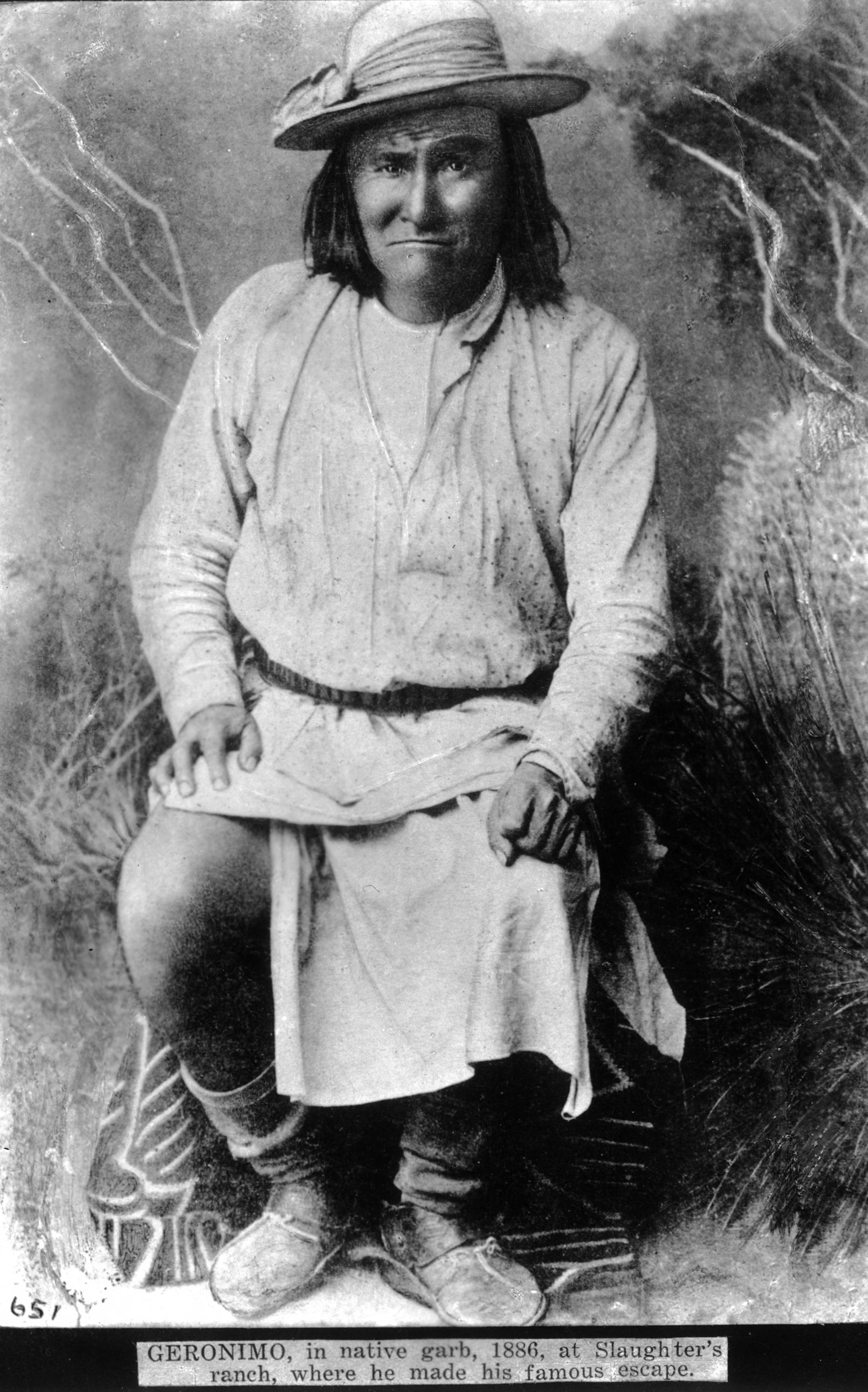
Chiricahua Apache warrior Geronimo

Annie Oakley

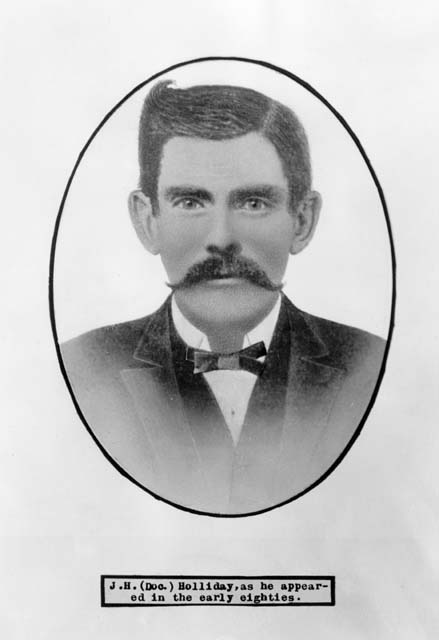
Doc Holliday

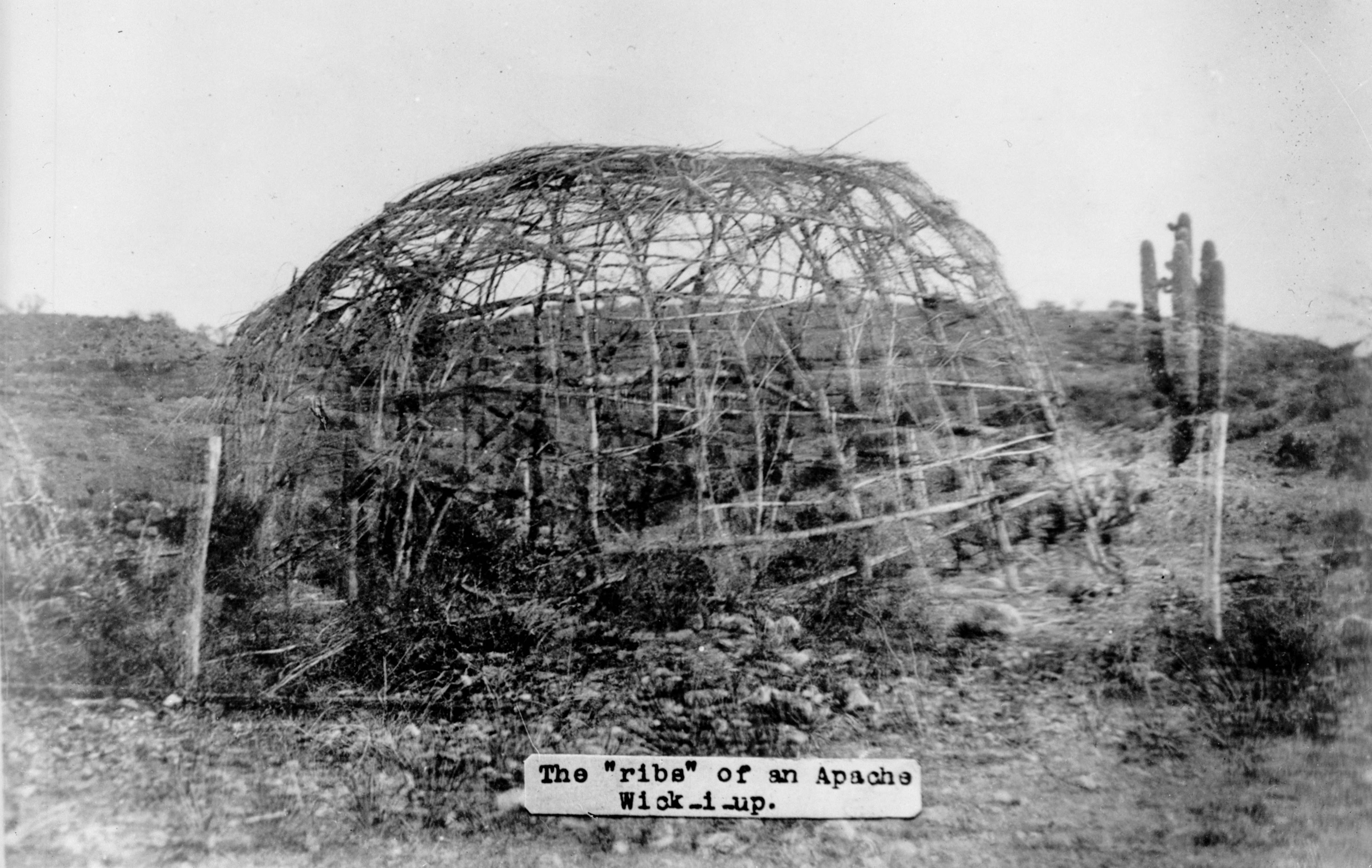
Ribs of Apache wickiup
