= Elizabeth Engstrom =

American speculative fiction writer

- Born: Bette Lynn Gutzmer; May 11, 1951 (age 75); Elmhurst, Illinois, U.S.
- Occupations: Writer, teacher
- Writing career
- Pen name: Elizabeth Engstrom, Liz Cratty
- Genres: Speculative fiction, horror fiction, fantasy
- Website: elizabethengstrom.net

Elizabeth Engstrom (born May 11, 1951) is an American speculative fiction writer.

== Biography ==
She was born Bette Lynn (Betsy) Gutzmer, but she legally changed her name to Elizabeth Engstrom a few years after publishing her first novel under that pseudonym. She is married to Al Cratty, and sometimes writes under the name Liz Cratty as well. She was nominated for a 1992 Bram Stoker Award for Best Fiction Collection for her book Nightmare Flower. Her anthology Dead on Demand: The Best of Ghost Story Weekend spent six months on the Library Journal "Best Seller List." Her short story, "Crosley", was picked to be included in The Thirteenth Annual Year's Best Fantasy and Horror, edited by Ellen Datlow. Her work has been published in The Magazine of Fantasy & Science Fiction, Horror Show, American Fantasy Magazine, and Cemetery Dance.

Elizabeth Engstrom also gives writing seminars on subjects like Structural Fiction, Sensual Fiction, Kick Start Your Novel, and The Architecture of Fiction. She was the owner of TripleTree Publishing, but she sold the business to Richard Ramsey in 2007. Under Engstrom's aegis, TripleTree published 19 books and put more than 200 authors in print for the first time.

She was an instructor and eventually Director of the Maui Writers Retreat and its Department of Continuing Education. She has her Bachelor of Arts in Literature and Writing, a Master's in Applied Theology and a Certificate of Pastoral Care and Ministry, all from Marylhurst University.

She gives a large portion of book sales on her website to the Melanoma Research Foundation. She was a founding member of Wordcrafters in Eugene, a literary community, and is a former faculty member at the University of Phoenix.

Engstrom's novel Candyland has been adapted as a film by Motorcycle Boy Productions of Vancouver, B.C., written and directed by Rusty Nixon, starring James Clayton, Chelah Horsdal and Gary Busey. The film Candiland was released in February 2017.

Her novel When Darkness Loves Us has been optioned for film by Light in the Dark Productions.

Recently, her two first books, When Darkness Loves Us, and Black Ambrosia, were re-released by Valancourt Books, with introductions by Grady Hendrix, as a part of their Paperbacks from Hell imprint.

Valancourt has recently republished a volume of her short stories, Nightmare Flower

== Selected works ==
=== Novels ===
- Lizzie Borden
- When Darkness Loves Us, foreword by Theodore Sturgeon (William Morrow, 1985)
- Black Ambrosia (Tor Books, 1986)
- Lizard Wine ISBN 0-9666272-1-0
- Black Leather ISBN 0-9716638-5-8
- Candyland ISBN 9780998846620
- The Northwoods Chronicles ISBN 978-1-59414-705-0
- York's Moon (February 2011) ISBN 978-1-59414-928-3
- Baggage Claim (February 2013) ASIN B00BDSS3FW
- Guys Named Bob (October 2018) ISBN 978-0999665633
- The Itinerant (November 2021) ISBN 9781734297898

=== Short story collections ===
- The Alchemy of Love (introduced by Jack Ketchum and illustrated by Alan M. Clark)
- Nightmare Flower (Tor Books) (Valancourt Books)
- Suspicions ISBN 0-9666272-9-6
- Unrequited Loss (May 2025) ISBN 9788985282796

=== Anthologies ===
- Mota 9: Addiction
- Imagination Fully Dilated co-edited with Alan M. Clark
- Imagination Fully Dilated Volume II co-edited with Alan M. Clark
- Dead on Demand: The Best of Ghost Story Weekend

=== Nonfiction ===
- The Maui Writers Conference Presents: Word by Word: An Inspirational Look at the Craft of Writing co-authored with John Tullius (also features Terry Brooks, Jackie Collins, Michael Eberhardt, Richard Paul Evans, Ernest J. Gaines, Julie Garwood, Elizabeth George, David Guterson, Tony Hillerman, Susan Isaacs, Ridley Pearson, Nicholas Sparks, Mitch Albom, Kenneth C. Davis, Ron Howard, Ron Bass, Mike Scully and many more). ISBN 0-9666272-6-1
- How to Write a Sizzling Sex Scene (2015)
- Divorce by Grand Canyon (2019)

=== Lectures on audio ===
Elizabeth Engstrom has made some of her seminars available on CD and cassette

- The Art of the Short Story
- Writing a Well-Crafted Sex Scene
- Creating Memorable Characters

== External links and references ==
- Official Website
- Blog
- Elizabeth Engstrom at the Internet Speculative Fiction Database
- Elizabeth Engstrom at the Library of Congress, with 10 library catalog records
