= Funland (novel) =

1989 book

- First edition (UK)
- Author: Richard Laymon
- Language: English
- Genre: Horror
- Published: 1989
- Publisher: W. H. Allen
- Publication place: USA
- Pages: 500

Funland is a 1989 novel by Richard Laymon. Set in the resort community of Boleta Bay, a violent gang of unknown assailants is assaulting the guests of the titular amusement park.

== Reception ==
Funland was a finalist for the 1990 Bram Stoker Award for Novel.
