= J. O'B. Scobey =

American politician (1854–1910)

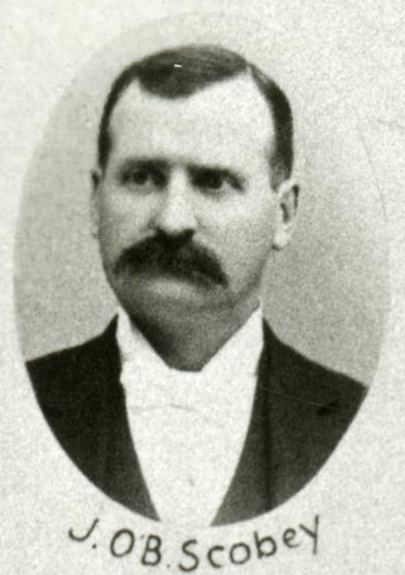
- Scobey in 1895

Member of the Washington House of Representatives for the 27th district
- In office 1895–1897

Personal details
- Born: July 5, 1854 Schoharie County, New York, United States
- Died: April 20, 1910 (aged 55) Tumwater, Washington, United States
- Party: Republican

John O'B. Scobey (July 5, 1854 – April 20, 1910) was an American politician in the state of Washington. He served in the Washington House of Representatives.
