= Alan M. Clark =

American author and artist

- Born: Alan Marshall Clark; May 10, 1957 (age 69)
- Education: San Francisco Art Institute (BFA)
- Occupations: Artist; illustrator; writer
- Writing career
- Period: 1985–present
- Genres: Horror fiction, Fantasy
- Website: alanmclark.com

Alan Marshall Clark (born May 10, 1957) is an American author and artist who is best known as the illustrator and book cover painter of many pieces of horror fiction. He was nominated for the Bram Stoker Award for Best First Novel for his 2005 book Siren Promised (co-written by Jeremy Robert Johnson).

He has won the World Fantasy Award for his illustrations ("Best Artist 1994"), and he has won four Association of Science Fiction and Fantasy Artists' Chesley Awards. He was Artist Guest of Honor at the 1995 World Horror Convention. His book The Paint in My Blood was nominated for the "Best Art Book" for the 2005 Locus Awards. It was also nominated for the 2005 International Horror Guild Award in the "Non-fiction" category. His artwork has been featured on signed limited editions from Cemetery Dance Publications, Lonely Road Books, Subterranean Press, Earthling Publications, and other publishers of hardcovers. His illustrations have also been on the covers and interiors of textbooks, children's books, paperbacks, magazines and CDs.

Clark received his Bachelor of Fine Arts from the San Francisco Art Institute in 1979. He owns the publishing company, IFD Publishing (started in 1999). He lives in Eugene, Oregon with his wife Melody.

Clark is listed in the 2009 edition of Science Fiction and Fantasy Artists of the Twentieth Century: A Biographical Dictionary edited by Robert Weinberg, Jane Frank (McFarland & Company, 2009).

== Select bibliography of Alan M. Clark ==
- The Paint in My Blood (also released as a limited edition with a CD) (IFD Publishing 2004). Paperback ISBN 0-9671912-6-2
- Siren Promised (co-written by Jeremy Robert Johnson) (Bloodletting Press, 2005 limited edition; reprinted by Swallowdown Press 2006; reprinted by IFD Publishing 2017). Paperback ISBN 978-0-9965536-9-8.
- Pain & Other Petty Plots to Keep You in Stitches (a short story collection edited by Alan M. Clark featuring illustrations, novella and short stories by him and a few others) (IFD Publishing, 2003). ISBN 0-9671912-5-4.
- The Blood of Father Time, Book 1, The New Cut (co-authored by Alan M. Clark, Stephen C. Merritt, and Lorelei Shannon). (Five Star Press, May 2007). ISBN 1-59414-595-4.
- The Blood of Father Time, Book 2, The Mystic Clan's Grand Plot (co-authored by Alan M. Clark, Stephen C. Merritt, and Lorelei Shannon) (Five Star Press, July 2007). ISBN 1-59414-604-7.
- D.D. Murphry, Secret Policeman (co-written by Elizabeth Massie) (Raw Dog Screaming Press 2009). Hardcover ISBN 978-1-933293-82-0 / Paperback ISBN 978-1-933293-83-7
- Boneyard Babies (Lazy Fascist Press 2010). Paperback ISBN 1-936383-21-7
- Of Thimble and Threat: The Life of a Ripper Victim (book 1 of the Jack the Ripper Victims Series) (Lazy Fascist Press 2011). Paperback ISBN 1-936383-69-1
- A Parliament of Crows (Lazy Fascist Press 2012). Paperback ISBN 1621050637
- The Door That Faced West (Lazy Fascist Press 2014). Paperback ISBN 978-1621051398
- Say Anything But Your Prayers (book 2 of the Jack the Ripper Victims Series) (Lazy Fascist Press 2014; reprinted IFD Publishing 2017). Paperback ISBN 978-0-9988466-0-6
- Jack the Ripper Victims Series: The Double Event (the first 2 novels of the Jack the Ripper Victims Series in one volume) (IFD Publishing 2015). ebook ISBN 978-0-9887767-7-7
- The Surgeon's Mate: A Dismemoir (IFD Publishing 2016). Paperback ISBN 978-0-9965536-2-9
- A Brutal Chill in August (book 3 of the Jack the Ripper Victims Series) (Word Horde 2016). Paperback ISBN 978-1-939905-25-3
- Apologies to the Cat's Meat Man (book 4 of the Jack the Ripper Victims Series) (IFD Publishing 2017). Paperback ISBN 978-0-9988466-1-3
- The Prostitute's Price (book 5 of the Jack the Ripper Victims Series) (IFD Publishing 2018). Paperback ISBN 978-0-9996656-1-9
- 13 Miller's Court (composed of two novels, The Prostitute's Price, by Alan M. Clark, and The Assassin's Coin, by John Linwood Grant, forming a single novel, their chapters alternating) (IFD Publishing, 2018 Paperback ISBN 978-0-9996656-7-1.
- Fallen Giants of the Points (IFD Publishing). Paperback ISBN 978-17342978-6-7
- Night Birds (co-written by Lisa Snellings) (IFD Publishing 2022). Paperback ISBN 979-8-9852827-3-3
- The Witch of Wapping: A Ghost Story (co-written by Rebecca J. Allred) (IFD Publishing 2024). Paperback ISBN 979-8-9852827-7-1
- The Will'ven't Bin (IFD Publishing 2025). Paperback ISBN 979-8-9931706-0-2

=== Essays and articles ===
- "Subterranean City" from Drawing and Painting Fantasy Landscapes and Cityscapes edited by Rob Alexander (Quarto Books, 2006).
- "Pixelated or Pixilated" from Paint or Pixel: The Digital Divide in Illustration Art edited by Jane Frank (Nonestop Press, 2007).

== Works ==
He has illustrated book covers and interior illustrations for the following authors and many more:

- Jay Bonansinga
- Ray Bradbury
- Gary A. Braunbeck
- David Brin
- Poppy Z. Brite
- Elizabeth Engstrom
- Christopher Golden
- Jim C. Hines
- Charlee Jacob
- Brian Keene
- Jack Ketchum
- Nancy Kilpatrick
- Stephen King
- Joe R. Lansdale
- Richard Laymon
- Edward Lee
- Brian Lumley
- James A. Moore
- L. E. Modesitt
- Yvonne Navarro
- William F. Nolan
- Norman Partridge
- Tom Piccirilli
- Bruce Holland Rogers
- Al Sarrantonio
- Allen Steele
- Steve Rasnic Tem
- Jeffrey Thomas
- F. Paul Wilson
