= List of science fiction comedy works =

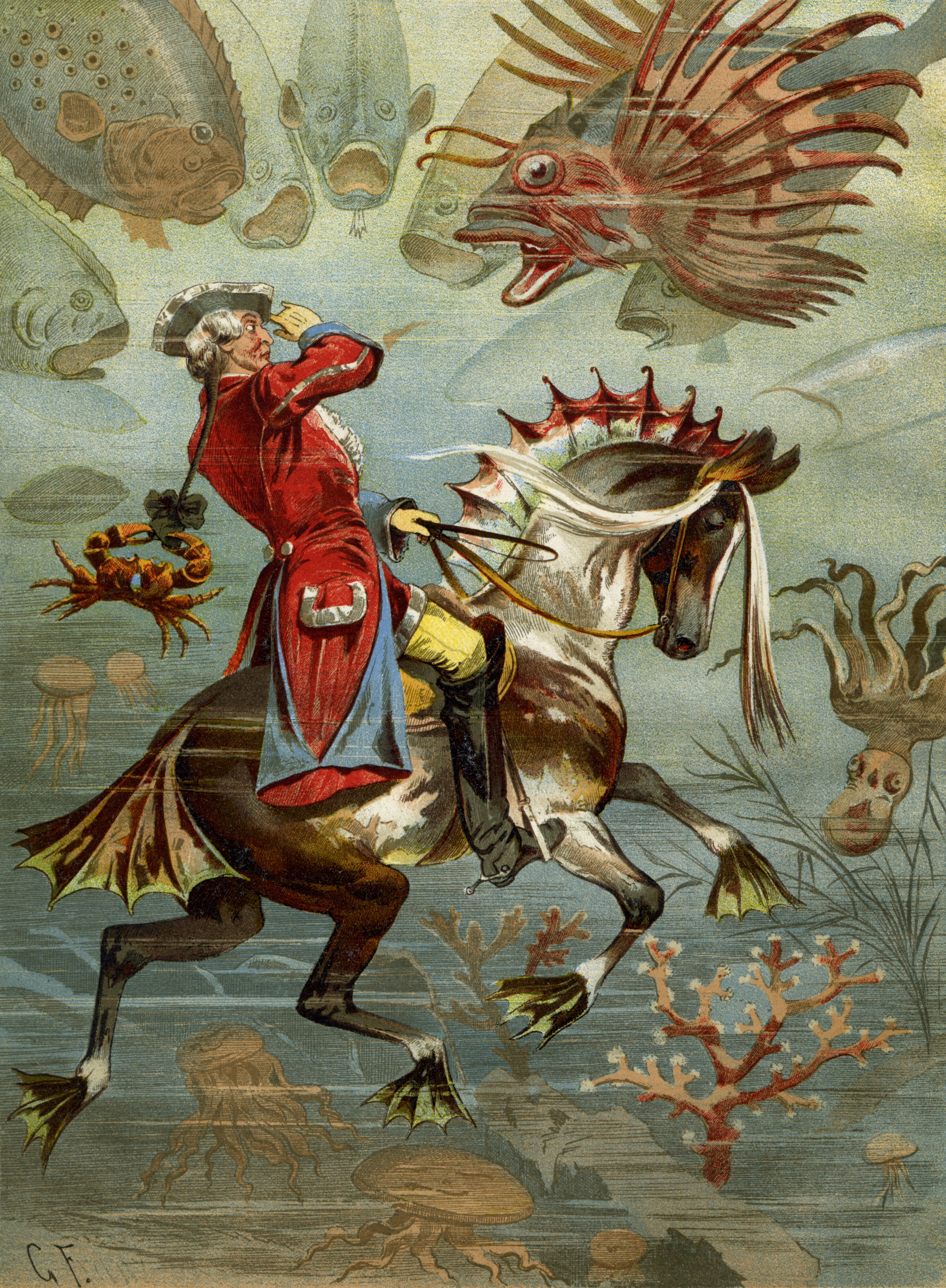
In the tall tales of Baron Munchausen, his adventures included visiting the Moon and travelling underwater

This is a list of science fiction comedy works—those mixing soft science fiction or science fantasy with comedy.

== Literature ==
- Douglas Adams' novels:
  - The Hitchhiker's Guide to the Galaxy and sequels
  - Dirk Gently's Holistic Detective Agency
- Robert Asprin's Phule series
- Fredric Brown's Martians, Go Home and other novels and short works.
- Steven Erikson's Willful Child
- Jasper Fforde's novel The Eyre Affair
- David S. Garnett's Stargonauts, Bikini Planet and Space Wasters
- Most of Ron Goulart's work
- Rob Grant and Doug Naylor's Red Dwarf
- The novels of Rob Grant (Colony, Incompetence and Fat).
- Harry Harrison's Stainless Steel Rat, Star Smashers of the Galaxy Rangers and Bill, the Galactic Hero novels
- Simon Haynes's Hal Spacejock novels
- Eric Idle's The Road to Mars
- Stanislaw Lem's novel Cyberiad and his Ijon Tichy stories.
- Larry Niven's collection The Draco Tavern
- John Scalzi's Redshirts: A Novel with Three Codas
- Much of Robert Sheckley's work
- Jonathan Swift's novel Gulliver's Travels, a proto-science fiction satire
- Kurt Vonnegut's novel The Sirens of Titan, and a lot of his work, including Slaughterhouse-Five
- Much of the work of Connie Willis
- D. Harlan Wilson's novels Dr. Identity and Codename Prague
- The novels of John Sladek.
- Charles Yu's novel How to Live Safely in a Science Fictional Universe

== Television ==
There are many animated Japanese series which use a science fiction-comedy or science fiction-fantasy-comedy setting. Urusei Yatsura, Dr. Slump, FLCL, Irresponsible Captain Tylor and Tenchi Muyo! are examples.

== Video games ==
- Giants: Citizen Kabuto
- Ratchet & Clank series
- Space Quest series
- Leather Goddesses of Phobos series
- Mother series
- Portal series
- Day of the Tentacle
- Borderlands series
- Earthworm Jim series
- Rex Nebular and the Cosmic Gender Bender

== Machinima ==
- Red vs. Blue (2003–present)

== Web series and streaming television ==
- Lobo (2000)
- The Crew (2008–present)
- Voyage Trekkers (2011–present)
- Other Space (2015)

== Webcomics ==
- Brewster Rockit: Space Guy! (2004–present)
- Schlock Mercenary (2000–present)
- Starslip Crisis (2005–present)

== Manga and anime ==
- Agravity Boys series by Atsushi Nakamura
- Gin Tama series by Hideaki Sorachi
- Hyper Police series by Minoru Tachikawa
- Space Dandy series by Shinichirō Watanabe

== Radio ==
- The Hitchhiker's Guide to the Galaxy (1978–2005)
- Canadia: 2056 (2007–present)
- Nebulous (2005–2008)
- Space Hacks (2007–2008)
- The Spaceship (2005–2008)
- Undone (2006–2010)

== Audio ==
- Ruby the Galactic Gumshoe (1982–present)
- Midnight Burger (2020-present)

== See also ==
- Comic fantasy
