= The Kafka Effekt =

2001 book by D. Harlan Wilson

- Author: D. Harlan Wilson
- Cover artist: Brandon Duncan
- Language: English
- Genre: Irrealism, Bizarro fiction, Postmodernism
- Publisher: Eraserhead Press
- Publication date: November 2001
- Publication place: United States
- Media type: Print
- Pages: 211 pp
- ISBN: 0-9713572-1-8
- OCLC: 49633671
- Followed by: Stranger on the Loose

The Kafka Effekt (2001) is the debut book of American author D. Harlan Wilson. It contains forty-four irreal short stories and flash fiction and has been said to combine the milieus of Franz Kafka and William S. Burroughs. Along with Carlton Mellick III's Satan Burger, Vincent Sakowski's Some Things Are Better Left Unplugged, Hertzan Chimera's Szmonhfu, Kevin L. Donihe's Shall We Gather at the Garden? and M.F. Korn's Skimming the Gumbo Nuclear, The Kafka Effekt was among the first books jointly released by Bizarro fiction publisher Eraserhead Press.
