= Bradley Sands =

American author and editor (born 1978)

- Born: December 28, 1978 (age 47); New York, United States
- Occupations: Novelist and editor
- Writing career
- Genres: Irrealism, Absurdist fiction, Bizarro fiction, Comedy, Science fiction, Fantasy, Horror, Transgressive fiction
- Notable work: Dodgeball High
- Literary movement: Bizarro fiction
- Website: bradleysands.com

Bradley Sands (born December 28, 1978) is an American author and editor. He is involved in the Bizarro movement in underground literature with Steve Aylett, Chris Genoa, Carlton Mellick III and D. Harlan Wilson.

Sands' work has been described as absurd, comedic, and transgressive. His influences include Steve Aylett, Mark Leyner, Woody Allen, Raymond Chandler, and the movie Airplane!

He received an &Now Award for Innovative Fiction.

Sands was the editor-in-chief of the defunct literary journal, Bust Down the Door and Eat All the Chickens, which was described as "the figurehead publication for the Bizarro, Absurdist, and modern Surrealist literary movements."

== Books ==
- It Came from Below the Belt (2006)
- My Heart Said No, But the Camera Crew Said Yes! (2010)
- Sorry I Ruined Your Orgy (2010)
- Rico Slade Will F*cking Kill You (2011)
- Please Do Not Shoot Me in The Face: A Novel (2011)
- TV Snorted My Brain (2012)
- Dodgeball High (2014)
- Liquid Status (2017)

== Anthologies ==
- Falling from the Sky (2007)
- The Bizarro Starter Kit (Blue) (2008)
- The & Now Awards: The Best Innovative Writing (2009)
- Warmed and Bound: A Velvet Anthology (2011)
- Amazing Stories of the Flying Spaghetti Monster (2011)
- Walrus Tales (2012)
