= Pseudo-City =

2005 book by D. Harlan Wilson

- Author: D. Harlan Wilson
- Cover artist: Brandon Duncan (based on Magritte: "Golconda"
- Language: English
- Genre: Irrealism, Bizarro, Postmodernism
- Publisher: Raw Dog Screaming Press
- Publication date: 2005
- Publication place: United States
- Media type: Print
- Pages: 226 pp
- ISBN: 1-933293-02-0
- Preceded by: Stranger on the Loose
- Followed by: Dr. Identity

Pseudo-City (2005) is the third book by American author D. Harlan Wilson. Referred to as a novel as often as a collection of stories—Wilson himself has called it a "story-cycle"—it contains twenty-nine irreal short stories and flash fiction that overlap and feature recurrent characters. Pieces in this collection originally appeared in magazines and journals such as Albedo one, The Dream People, Red Cedar Review, Nemonymous, Milk Magazine and Bust Down the Door and Eat All the Chickens.
