= Peckinpah: An Ultraviolent Romance =

2009 novel by D. Harlan Wilson

- Author: D. Harlan Wilson
- Cover artist: LeMat & Danny Evarts
- Language: English
- Genre: Fantasy, Horror, Metafiction, Irrealism, Bizarro
- Publisher: Shroud
- Publication date: 2009
- Publication place: United States
- Media type: Print
- Pages: 116
- ISBN: 978-0-9819894-2-6
- Preceded by: Blankety Blank: A Memoir of Vulgaria
- Followed by: They Had Goat Heads

Peckinpah: An Ultraviolent Romance (2009) is a short critifictional novel by American author D. Harlan Wilson. It is a series of vignettes, folk tales and pseudobiographical sketches covering two stories, one about a man named Felix Soandso who seeks vengeance on a gang of exploitation film villains after they kill his wife, the other about the life of filmmaker Sam Peckinpah.

While the novel did not receive any awards, it was endorsed by Alan Moore, who called it "a bludgeoning celluloid rush of language and ideas served from an action-painter's bucket" and "an incendiary gem." HorrorNews.Net, however, described it as, "an empty intellectual exercise" and suggested that, "This is what happens when authors try too hard to be Literate and don’t put the story above their ego."
