= Rekt =

2025 horror novel by Alex Gonzalez

- 1st edition cover
- Author: Alex Gonzalez
- Audio read by: Robb Moreira
- Genre: horror; psychological thriller
- Publisher: Erewhon Books
- Publication date: 2025-03-25
- Media type: Print (hardcover); Print (paperback); Digital (ebook); Digital (audiobook)
- Pages: 368 (1st edition hardcover)
- ISBN: 978-1-64566-159-7
- Website: https://www.kensingtonbooks.com/9781645661610/rekt/

rekt is a 2025 horror debut novel by Alex Gonzalez.

== Themes ==
Archita Mittra of Locus Magazine wrote that the novel examines "toxic masculinity and unhealthy tech-fueled coping mechanisms."

== Reception ==
Publishers Weekly wrote that "Gonzalez strives to shock with crude jokes and depictions of extreme violence (including against an infant), but balances the novel’s baser instincts with crisp storytelling and a well-shaded cast that readers will want to follow through the complex and propulsive plot," saying that "the intense ugliness of the subject matter and dark sense of humor won’t be for everyone, but extreme horror fans who grew up on the internet will find plenty to hold their attention." Archita Mittra of Locus Magazine described the novel as "subversive, disconcerting, and definitely not for the faint of heart," as well as "morbidly fascinating, thought-provoking and pretty much unputdownable." Paul di Filippo of Locus described the novel as "pretty much a punch in the face," saying that it was "a propulsively readable hellride, and what is arguably, in the end, a high-minded and damning depiction of postmodern callousness, power imbalances, degradation, lack of empathy and general all-round going-off-the-tracks of what we laughably call “civilization.”" Gabino Iglesias of The New York Times said that it was "a great novel, but it’s not a fun read. “Rekt” is ugly and ruthless, moving from normal situations to gut-churning descriptions in a heartbeat. Gonzalez is a talented author who delivers solid character development and sharp writing about grief and guilt, but what sets this novel apart is its unflinching brutality."
