= Coyote Songs =

2018 horror novel by Gabino Iglesias

- Author: Gabino Iglesias
- Language: English; Spanish
- Set in: American Southwest; Mexico
- Publisher: Broken River Books
- ISBN: 9781940885490

Coyote Songs is a 2018 novel by Gabino Iglesias. It has variously been described as "barrio noir", horror, crime, and bizarro fiction. It tells the loosely related stories of several characters in the American Southwest. It was a finalist for the 2018 Bram Stoker Award for Best Fiction Collection and the 2019 Locus Award for Best Horror Novel.

== Plot ==
A ghost, or bruja, named La Inmaculada haunts the area outside Piedras Negras, Coahuila. She and her family died in an overheated car as coyotes attempted to smuggle them across the border. Her spirit seeks revenge for the death of her son. Her anger radiates outward, causing violence and destruction.

The Mother, a pregnant woman in Nuevo Laredo, lives alone with her son. Each night, she gives birth to a monstrous creature, which then re-enters her womb. She suspects that the creature is killing local babies. She contemplates suicide as her body begins to deteriorate. One night, as the creature leaves her womb, she attacks and destroys it with a knife. She hugs her son as the sun rises.

Pedrito and his father, Don Pedro, fish for alligator gar in the Rio Grande. Don Pedro is shot and killed. Pedrito visits Santos, a man who job is to destroy the bodies of cartel victims. As a test, Pedrito murders one of Santos's workers. Santos and Pedrito decide to kill a group of child traffickers.

The Coyote helps migrant children cross the border to the United States. He beats the children to make it look like they are victims of gang violence, allowing them a better chance of success at getting asylum. He has a vision of the Virgin Mary killing child traffickers. The Coyote speaks with his priest, a reformed Neo-Nazi, regarding this vision. The priest advises the Coyote on where he can attack child traffickers. The Coyote attacks, inadvertently killing Pedrito and Santos in the process.

In Houston, Texas, Jaime is released from prison. He beats up his mother's abusive boyfriend, grabs a gun, and flees. After a chase, he is shot and killed by police.

Alma, a performance artist, works on a piece about her blood and her multiracial heritage. She begins seeing visions of death and violence. She makes a deal to perform at a local theater. At her performance, she bars the doors and slaughters several audience members with a machete before she is shot and killed.

La Inmaculada regrets the destruction that has been caused by her anger. She leaves the world and joins her son and husband in the afterlife.

== Major themes ==
Coyote Songs has been described as a "barrio noir" novel, blending horror, crime fiction, and surrealism. Reviewer David Tromblay believes that attaching a genre lens such as "crime fiction, magic-realism, transgressive fiction, or horror" would be a mistake, as "barrio noir" is distinct from all of those.

Writer Manuel Aragon states that the stories of Pedrito and the Coyote are parallel stories guided by opposing views of good and evil. This is shown in the contrast between La Inmaculada and the Virgin Mary, which guide the two characters respectively. Aragon also believes that Alma's story criticizes viral video culture and the way in which artists are encouraged to create content for likes and views.

Author Hector Acosta believes that the Mother's monster is a representation of "the ugliness and hatred some aim at the border and its people".

A review in the San Antonio Current praised the novel's unflinching examination of the border as a crisis in American society. The review compared the novel to the music video for This is America by Childish Gambino; both works use brutal violence to draw attention to their causes.

In the Michigan Quarterly Review, David Tromblay wrote that Coyote Songs is "very much a commentary on current events". It takes place in a world which most readers assume is "a world away," forcing them to examine their beliefs about people often labeled as "criminals" and "enemies". It also examines the fallacy that there are "very fine people on both sides". According to Kurt Baumeister, the novel explores divisions in American society and the way in which white America fails to care about people similar to the novel's characters. It also explores ignorance and reductive thinking with regards to political issues, criticizing the policies of President Donald Trump.

The novel's use of both Spanish and English may make some English-speaking readers feel out of place; this is a reflection on the way in which immigrants are often made to feel.

== Style ==
The narrative shifts between English, Spanish, and Spanglish. Much of the novel's dialogue is written in Spanish, while there are surrounding context clues in English.

The focus of the story shifts between six different characters. The stories remain mostly separate from each other, but they are connected by shared tone and thematic material. Some of the stories end abruptly in the middle of the novel.

== Reception ==
The novel received critical praise. It was a finalist for the 2018 Bram Stoker Award for Best Fiction Collection and the 2019 Locus Award for Best Horror Novel.

In an article for Fiction Unbound, writer Manuel Aragon praised the novel, calling it a "masterfully woven tale of pain and loss." A review for Volume 1 Brooklyn called it "a propulsive, engaging read from start to finish." A review in MysteryTribune called the novel "ambitious" and "vibrant". A review in the San Antonio Current praised the novel's unflinching examination of the border crisis, writing that "this is the kind of novel that crushes ignorance". An article in Michigan Quarterly Review called the novel "an eyeopener, an invitation to step through the looking glass" and praised its exploration of current events and American political ideas as they relate to the border. Writing for The Nervous Breakdown, Kurt Baumeister stated that the novel "deserves to be taken seriously as a piece of art and an entertainment".
