= Zombies and Shit =

2010 book by Carlton Mellick III

- Book Cover
- Author: Carlton Mellick III
- Language: English
- Publisher: Eraserhead Press
- ISBN: 9781936383191

Zombies and Shit is a zombie-filled Bizarro fiction written by Carlton Mellick III and was released in 2010 by the publishing company Eraserhead Press.

== Plot ==
A large group people awaken in the middle of a post-apocalyptic-type wasteland with no recollection of how they got there. Each person is equipped with a backpack of supplies and an odd weapon. The group soon finds out that they are a part of a reality show known as Zombies and Shit and their objective is to get to the rescue zone where there will be a helicopter waiting to take them to safety. This island is crawling with zombies that are there for the sole purpose of feasting on their flesh. It soon becomes apparent to the group that there is only one seat available on the helicopter. Zombies will not be the only things trying to stop them from reaching the rescue zone alive as soon they will have to turn on each other.

Shaun of the Dead meets Battle Royale in this over-the-top, action-packed, and all-out bloody gore fest of a battle for survival.

== Reception ==
Matthew J. Barbour of Horror Novel Reviews gave it a 5 out of 5 saying "For fans and those interested in bizarro literature, Zombies and Shit is a must read."
