= Carlton Mellick III =

American author (born 1977)

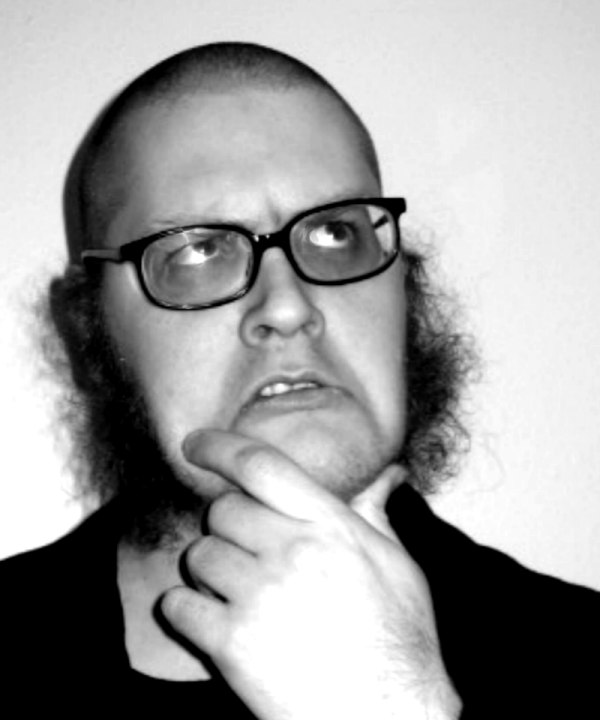
- Mellick c. 2007
- Born: July 2, 1977 (age 49); Phoenix, Arizona, U.S.
- Occupation: Novelist
- Writing career
- Genres: Bizarro fiction, fantasy, horror, science fiction, horror comedy
- Literary movement: Bizarro fiction
- Website: carltonmellick.com

Carlton Mellick III (born July 2, 1977) is an American author currently residing in Portland, Oregon. He is best known as one of the leading authors in the Bizarro movement in underground literature.

Mellick's work has been described as a combination of trashy schlock sci-fi/horror and postmodern literary art. His novels explore surreal versions of earth in contemporary society and imagined futures, commonly focusing on social absurdities and satire.

== Biography ==
Carlton Mellick III started writing at the age of ten and completed twelve novels by the age of eighteen. Only one of these early novels, Electric Jesus Corpse, ever made it to print. Mellick attended Clarion West in 2008, where he studied under such authors as Chuck Palahniuk, Cory Doctorow, Connie Willis, Paul Park, and Mary Rosenblum.

He is best known for his first novel Satan Burger, which was translated into Russian and published by Ultra Culture in 2005. It was part of a four book series called Brave New World, which also featured Virtual Light by William Gibson, City Come A Walkin by John Shirley, and Tea from an Empty Cup by Pat Cadigan.

In the late 1990s, he formed a collective for offbeat authors which included D. Harlan Wilson, Kevin L. Donihe, Vincent Sakowski, among others, and the publishing company Eraserhead Press. This scene evolved into the Bizarro fiction movement in 2005.

== Controversy ==
The novel Satan Burger earned a degree of notoriety in 2005 when Jared Armstrong of Girdwood, Alaska was incarcerated. The charges, giving/showing indecent material to a minor, were dismissed by the prosecutor four months later. The Alaska Court found that the arrest and approximately 15 search warrants executed by the Anchorage Police Department for dissemination of the novel Satan Burger were illegal. A Federal Civil Rights suit brought by Armstrong against the lead Detective Gerard Asselin under Title 42 §1983 U.S.C was dismissed by the Ninth Circuit Court of Appeals in 2013.

== Bibliography ==
=== Novels ===
- Satan Burger (2001)
- Electric Jesus Corpse (2002)
- Punk Land (2005) (sequel to Satan Burger) ISBN 0976249847
- Warrior Wolf Women of the Wasteland (2009)
- Zombies and Shit (2010)
- Tumor Fruit (2012)
- Quicksand House (2013)
- Hungry Bug (2014)
- ClownFellas: Tales of the Binzo Family (2015)
- Bio Melt (2015)

=== Novellas ===
- Razor Wire Pubic Hair (2003)
- Teeth and Tongue Landscape (2003)
- The Steel Breakfast Era (2003)
- The Baby Jesus Butt Plug: A Fairytale (2004)
- Fishyfleshed (2004)
- The Menstruating Mall (2005)
- Ocean Of Lard (w. Kevin L. Donihe 2005)
- Sex and Death in Television Town (2006)
- Sea of the Patchwork Cats (2006)
- The Haunted Vagina (2006)
- War Slut (2006)
- Sausagey Santa (2007)
- Ugly Heaven, Beautiful Hell (2007)
- Ultra Fuckers (2008)
- Adolf in Wonderland (2008)
- Cybernetrix (2008)
- The Egg Man (2008)
- Apeshit (2008)
- The Faggiest Vampire (2009)
- The Cannibals of Candyland (2009)
- The Kobold Wizard's Dildo of Enlightenment +2 (2010)
- Crab Town (2011)
- The Morbidly Obese Ninja (2011)
- I Knocked Up Satan's Daughter (2011)
- Armadillo Fists (2011)
- The Handsome Squirm (2012)
- Kill Ball (2012)
- Cuddly Holocaust (2013)
- Village of the Mermaids (2013)
- Clusterfuck (2013)
- The Tick People (2014)
- Sweet Story (2014)
- As She Stabbed Me Gently in the Face (2015)
- Every Time We Meet at the Dairy Queen, Your Whole Fucking Face Explodes (2016)
- The Terrible Thing That Happens (2016)
- Exercise Bike (2017)
- Spider Bunny (2017)
- The Big Meat (2017)
- Parasite Milk (2017)
- Stacking Doll (2018)
- Neverday (2018)
- The Boy with the Chainsaw Heart (2018)
- Mouse Trap (2019)
- Snuggle Club (2020)
- The Bad Box (2020)
- Full Metal Octopus (2021)
- Goblins on the Other Side (2022)
- The Girl with the Barbed Wire Hair (2022)
- You Always Try to Kill Me in Your Dreams (2023)
- Glass Children (2023)
- Why I Married a Clown Girl From the Dimension of Death (2023)
- Apeship (2024)
- Scorpion Ranch (2025)

=== Collections ===
- Sunset with a Beard (2000/2010)
- Barbarian Beast Bitches of the Badlands (2011)
- Fantastic Orgy (2011)
- Hammer Wives (2013)

=== Selected short fiction ===
- "Hamburger Clock" – The Dream Zone (magazine) (2001)
- "Porno in August" – Random Acts of Weirdness, reprinted in The Year's Best Fantasy and Horror (2002)
- "God on Television" – Falling From the Sky (2007)
- "The Immortal" – The Flash (2007)
- "City Hobgoblins" – Perverted by Language: Fiction Inspired by The Fall (2007)
- "Candy Coated" – Vice magazine (December 2008)
- "Simple Machines" – The Magazine of Bizarro Fiction #2 (2009)
- "Lemon Knives n Cockroaches" – Zombies: Encounters with the Hungry Dead
- "War Pig" – Werewolves and Shapeshifters: Encounters with the Beast Within
- "Stupid Fucking Reason to Sell Your Soul" – Demons: Encounters with the Devil and His Minions, Fallen Angels, and the Possessed (2011)
- Red World – Chapbook, edited by Chatham University MFA candidate Matthew Humphrey (2012)

=== As editor ===
- Christmas on Crack (2010) – with stories by Jordan Krall, Jeff Burk, Andrew Goldfarb, Kevin L. Donihe, Edmund Colell, Cameron Pierce and Kirsten Alene, and Kevin Shamel
