= Blankety Blank: A Memoir of Vulgaria =

Satire-Bizarro novel

Blankety Blank
- Author: D. Harlan Wilson
- Cover artist: almacan & Brandon Duncan
- Language: English
- Genre: Irrealism, Bizarro, Science Fiction, Horror, Postmodernism, Memoir, Novel
- Publisher: Raw Dog Screaming Press
- Publication date: 2008
- Publication place: United States
- Media type: Print
- Pages: 188 pp
- ISBN: 978-1-933293-50-9
- OCLC: 259224953
- Preceded by: Dr. Identity
- Followed by: Technologized Desire

Blankety Blank: A Memoir of Vulgaria (2005) is a novel by American author D. Harlan Wilson.

The novel critiques the idea of the memoir as a form of truth-telling and problematizes history and narrative itself, as possible modes of truth. It contains various “short histories” and literary devices that are flagrantly inaccurate or misguided, all in a way that underscores the constructiveness of the human condition, as well as humanity's collective racist tendencies.
