= Aigner Loren Wilson =

American speculative-fiction author, editor and poet

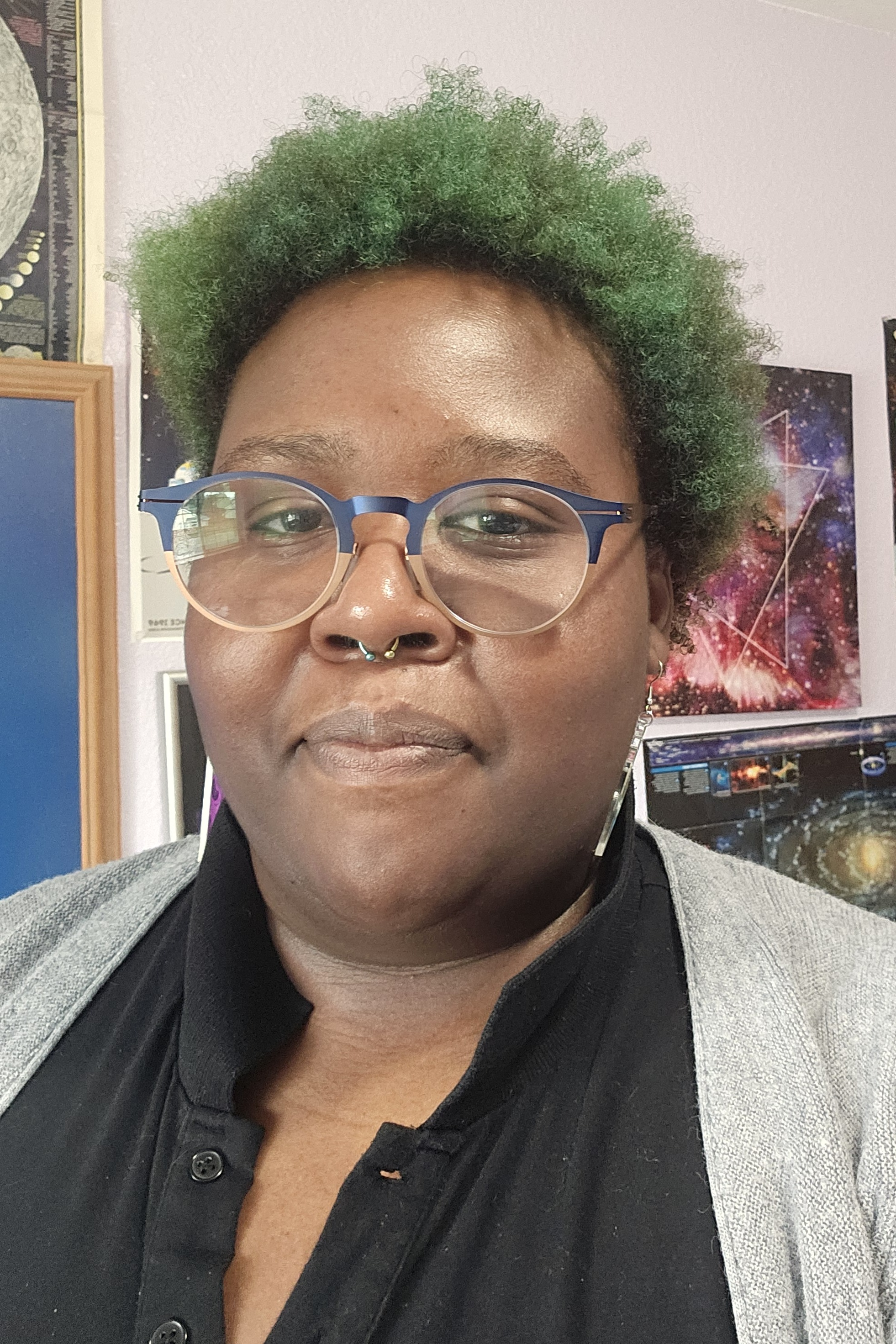
- Wilson in 2024
- Occupation: Writer; editor
- Period: 2018–present
- Genre: Science fiction, Horror, Fantasy, Afrofuturism, Speculative fiction
- Subject: Book reviews, Game reviews, Art, Podcast reviews, Critical media analysis

Website
- aignerlwilson.com

Aigner Loren Wilson is an Ignyte Award nominated writer for her speculative fiction and nonfiction writing and Hugo Award winning editor for her work as senior fiction editor for Strange Horizons from 2021 to 2025. Her work has been called, "profoundly disturbing and ethereal." She is from coastal New Jersey but currently lives in the Pacific Northwest.

== Writing career ==
Wilson began her professional speculative fiction writing career in 2018 with a published flash fiction in the literary speculative fiction podcast Nightlight: A Black Horror Podcast. After several subsequent poetry sales, Wilson made first professional SF prose sale in 2022 to Lightspeed (magazine), a magazine for which she went on to write monthly speculative fiction book reviews focusing on diverse books and authors. Other professional outlets in which her fiction has appeared include The Magazine of Fantasy & Science Fiction, Interzone (magazine), and FIYAH Literary Magazine. Her writing frequently incorporates humor even in works that are dark and serious in subject.

Wilson's speculative fiction editing career began in 2015 when she joined Strange Horizons and Nightlight: A Black Horror Podcast as a first reader and associate editor. She began her senior fiction editing in 2021 with guest editing positions for Apparition Literary Magazine and Fireside Fiction. Wilson served as senior fiction editor for Strange Horizons from 2021 to 2025. In 2024, she self-published a serialized novella, Twilight Children, through her newsletter, Writing Skins.

Along with her speculative fiction and poetry writing, Wilson publishes nonfiction in prominent outlets such as Wired (magazine), The Washington Post, and Reactor (magazine) (formerly TOR). She began writing nonfiction in 2019 for local publications in her area, Thurstontalk and Olyarts, covering topics related to arts, literature, and community events. From 2020 to 2022, Wilson wrote podcast reviews and interviews with podcasters for Discover Pods, including her monthly review roundup series Radio at the End of the World. Combining her work as a prolific editor and writer, Wilson began writing craft articles in 2021 for Writer's Digest, The Writer Magazine, and other publications. She also wrote for the Tor Nightfire blog doing reviews of horror short fiction and poetry in 2022.

== Personal life ==
Wilson enjoys hiking, books, games, and bread bakes. She lives with an unspecified number of partners and pets. She is a fan of vampires, but identifies more strongly with werewolves.

== Selected Works ==
=== Fiction ===
- It Came Gently (Lightspeed Magazine)
- Whatever Takes Us (Nightmare Magazine)
- Building Blocks (Interzone Magazine)
- You Who Does Not Exist (Baffling Magazine)
- To Carve Home in Your Bones (The Magazine of Fantasy and Science Fiction)

=== Poetry ===
- Christine (The Five-2)
- Phantom (Arsenika)
- Demon at My Window (FIYAH)
- Come to Me (Anathema Spec from the Margins)

=== Books ===
- Twilight Children (Substack)
- to be haunted (Haus of Three Crows)
- Plagued Company (Haus of Three Crows)

=== Games ===
- The Nightmare House (Itch.Io)
- Take Me Home (Itch.Io)

=== Stories Edited ===
- My Body by J. S. Jordan
- The Night the River Meets the Sky by Lina Rather
- Song of the Balsa Wood Bird by Katherine Quevedo
- Sheer in the Sun, They Pass by Hester J. Rook
- Seen Small Through Glass, by Premee Mohamed
- Oversharing, by R. J. Theodore
- A Message From Her Feline Self, Unborn, to Her Cousin, Whose Ancestors Were Once Wolves, by Jessica Cho
- We Are the Thing That Lives on the Moon, by Gillian Secord
- Give My Body to the Moths, by Riley Neither
- The Stars Above Eos, by M. Darusha Wehm
- Since He Came Back, by Lindsay King-Miller
- Mother Tongue, by Atreyee Gupta
- The Book of the Blacksmiths, by Martin Cahill
- Not a Basking Shark, by Hesper Leveret
- Fire and Ice by Anya Markov
- The Sing-along Killing and Silent Death of Malakine, the Horse Whisperer By Abhilash Jayachandra
- Undog by Eugenia Triantafyllou
- Death Comes for the Sworn Virgins by Avra Margariti
- Here All Week by Natasha King
- City Grown from Seed by Diana Dima
- Of Heirlooms and Teeth by Kaitlin Tremblay
- Sprouting God by Ezra Pilar Rodriguez
- Up in the Hills, She Dreams of Her Daughter Deep in the Ground by Karlo Yeager Rodriguez
- Four Steps to Hunt a God by Athar Fikry
- Colors of the Sea by Katherine Nabity
- Of Flesh, Of Bone By Tania Chen
- Grey Hands, Green Sky by Charlie Valenti
- Speak No Evil by Edidiong Uzoma Essien
- Maladaptive Camouflage by Ann LeBlanc
- Time is an Ocean by Angela Liu
- A Cure for Solastalgia by E.M. Linden
- Frogskin by M. L. Krishnan
- Rembrandt, graffiti, and the strange disappearance of ducks by C.H. Irons
- Feeder Fish by Anne Mai Yee Jansen
- Cicadas, and Their Skins by Avra Margariti
- The Wilding Year by Jamie M. Boyd
- The Problem With Feelin’ Flo-Jo’s Glory Pose by Aurelius Raines II
- Whale Fall by J.L. Akagi
- Thirteen Ways of Looking at a Blackened Husk of a Planet by Adeline Wong
- The Lord of Mice’s Arrows by Nadia Radovich
- Exit Interview by K.W. Onley
- Bullet Time at the Kink Party by miriam
- View Window by A. T. Greenblatt
- How to Dispose of a Dead Albatross by Octavia Cade
- Everything We Lost in the Apocalypse by Mar Vincent
- Pandora's Formula by Hannah Yang
- The Last Time Gladys Howled At the Moon by Jennifer Hudak
- The Luring Lantern by Laura Cranehill

=== Nonfiction & Reviews ===
- The Perfect Escape: What goes into designing cozy life sim games (The Washington Post)
- Finding Your Character’s Voice (Writer’s Digest)
- How I Punched Up My Fiction to Get Out of the Slush Pile (Writer’s Digest)
- Double Duty: Showing Character Development Through Dialogue (Writer's Digest)
- Shigidi and the Brass Head of Obalufon by Wole Talabi
- He Who Drowned the World by Shelley Parker-Chan
- The Splinter in the Sky by Kemi Ashing-Giwa
- Vampires of El Norte by Isabel Cañas
- Even Though I Knew the End by C.L. Polk
- The Saint of Bright Doors by Vajra Chandrasekera
- The Reformatory by Tananarive Due

== Awards ==
Year	Title	Award	Category	Result
2019	n/a	Otherwise Award (formerly Tiptree Award)		Honors list
2023	n/a	Ignyte Award	Critics Award	Finalist
2023	"To Carve Home in Your Bones"	Ignyte Award	Outstanding Novelette	Finalist
2024	n/a	Ignyte Award	Critics Award	Finalist
2024	Senior Fiction Editor	Hugo Award	Best Semiprozine	Winner
