= Satan Burger =

2001 novel by Carlton Mellick III

- Cover of the 2001 Eraserhead Press edition
- Author: Carlton Mellick III
- Language: English
- Publisher: Eraserhead Press
- Publication date: 2001

Satan Burger is a bizarro fiction novel by Carlton Mellick III, published in 2001 by Eraserhead Press. Mellick's debut novel, Satan Burger is both one of his best known works and one of the most prominent novels in the largely underground bizarro fiction movement. The novel attracted a cult following soon after its release and has been translated into Russian.

The novel is told from the point of view of a narrator who sees his own body in third person as an unusual plague spreads to everyone over the age of twenty-five.

A 15th anniversary edition with an alternative cover was released in 2016.

== Controversy ==
The novel Satan Burger was brought to the public attention in 2005 when Jared Armstrong of Girdwood, Alaska was incarcerated. The charges, giving/showing indecent material to a minor, were dismissed by the prosecutor four months later. The Alaska Court found that the arrest and approximately 15 search warrants executed by the Anchorage Police Department for dissemination of the novel Satan Burger were illegal. A Federal Civil Rights suit brought by Armstrong against the lead Detective Gerard Asselin under Title 42 §1983 U.S.C was dismissed by the Ninth Circuit Court of Appeals in 2013.
