= The Devil Takes You Home =

2022 novel by Gabino Iglesias

- Author: Gabino Iglesias
- Language: English; Spanish
- Publisher: Mulholland Books
- Publication date: 2 August 2022
- Publication place: United States
- Pages: 320 (first edition)
- Awards: 2022 Bram Stoker Award for Best Novel; 2022 Shirley Jackson Award for Best Novel
- ISBN: 9780316426916

The Devil Takes You Home is a 2022 novel by Gabino Iglesias. It won the 2022 Bram Stoker Award for Best Novel and the 2022 Shirley Jackson Award for Best Novel.

== Plot ==
Mario and Melisa, the parents of four-year-old Anita, learn that their daughter has acute lymphoblastic leukemia. Soon after, Mario loses his job and health insurance. Anita does not respond well to chemotherapy. Mario contacts Brian, a former coworker and current drug dealer. Brian offers Mario a contract as a hit man. Mario accepts, earning $6000 for his first murder. On his way back to the hospital, Melisa calls to tell him that Anita has died. During an argument, Mario strikes Melisa. She then leaves him and files for divorce.

Mario continues killing people for Brian. Brian meets Mario at a bar and offers him a big job. Mario has a vision of a levitating man, who warns him of impending danger. Brian introduces Mario to Juanca, a former driver for the Sinaloa Cartel. Together, they plan to steal a truck full of drug money. They plan to kill the truck’s crew, making the Sinaloans think that the truckers absconded with the money. Meanwhile, the three perpetrators will work with Don Vasquez of the Juárez Cartel to cover their tracks. Mario’s cut will be $200,000. He agrees to join the plot. Brian wants to use the money to go to rehab and start a new life with Stephanie, his pregnant girlfriend. Mario hopes that Melisa will return and they can start a new life together.

Mario, Brian, and Juanca leave Houston for San Antonio. There, they meet a woman named Sonia and her grandson, who is believed to have magical powers. Several of the boy’s fingers and toes have been amputated. Juanca gives Sonia a bag of money; Sonia cuts off the child’s toe with bolt cutters. A horrified Mario looks on, unable to stop the torture. Sonia gives the severed toe to Juanca, claiming that it will protect them.

On the way to El Paso, the crew stops at a diner. They are harassed by white supremacists. Juanca pistol-whips one of the men, while Mario holds the onlookers at gunpoint. As they flee the scene, Mario finds photos of a murdered man in Juanca’s glovebox. Juanca brings Mario and Brian to his mother’s home in El Paso. They enter a tunnel to Ciudad Juárez which is concealed beneath the kitchen floor.

They meet Don Vasquez; Juanca gives him the severed toe. Vasquez executes a man by disembowelment. He then feeds the toe to a witch, Gloria. Gloria vomits up grey-white liquid. Vasquez blessed Mario, Juanca, and Brian with it, claiming that it will protect them. They then drive back to the USA with the disemboweled corpse.

Back in El Paso, Juanca and his mother both warn Mario that Brian will betray him, claiming that Brian will kill Mario to take a larger share of the money. Mario overhears Brian talking to Stephanie, which seems to confirm an impending betrayal. Mario and Juanca agree to kill Brian, splitting the money.

On the day of the heist, the group meets a pair of gun runners who work with Don Vasquez. The gun runners shoot at the cartel’s truck. Juanca and Mario remove the disemboweled corpse from their truck. The corpse comes to life, attacking the cartel members and killing all of them. Mario then shoots and kills Brian, who seems to be reaching for his gun. The corpse kills the surviving gun runner, leaving Mario and Juanca as the only human survivors. The identity of the murdered man in Juanca’s photos is revealed: he was Juanca’s brother, killed by the Sinaloa Cartel. Juanca pins the photos to the cartel members’ corpses as an act of revenge.

Don Vasquez gives Mario and Juanca the $600,000 to split between the two of them. Mario and Juanca return to the United States. Mario finds Brian’s gun and realizes that Brian never intended to kill him. He contemplates suicide, but decides to give Stephanie the money first. When he arrives at Stephanie’s house, he learns that Stephanie and Juanca were having an affair; Juanca tricked Mario into killing Brian purposefully. Stephanie shoots Mario in the stomach. She and Juanca flee with the money. Mario sees a shadowy figure moving toward him. He calls Melisa, getting her voicemail as he prepares for death.

== Major themes ==
The Devil Takes You Home, along with other works by Iglesias, has been described as "barrio noir." Writing for NPR, Ilana Masad examined The Devil Takes You Home and its relationship to noir fiction. Masad quoted Otto Penzler by stating that noir characters "are caught in the inescapable prisons of their own construction, forever trapped by their isolation from their own souls, as well as from society and the moral restrictions that permit it to be regarded as civilized." Masad then quoted Iglesias himself, who describes "barrio noir" as "any writing that walks between languages, borders, and cultures [and] that occupies a plethora of interstitial spaces and isn't afraid to engage with all religions and superstitions as well as to bring in supernatural elements." Masad further situated Iglesias's writing in the modern world, describing its relationship to migrant deaths at the U.S.-Mexico border, the curtailing of reproductive rights by the United States Supreme Court, and mass shootings, among other issues.

== Style ==
The majority of The Devil Takes You Home is written in English, with significant portions written in Spanish. According to Ilana Masad, "any Spanish dialogue too important to the plot or mood is translated."

Tobias Carroll of Reactor wrote that the novel is intentionally ambiguous. Carroll's review stated that it is possible to read the novel as a work of noir fiction with supernatural elements, but that it is also theoretically possible to "view many of the uncanny elements here as being visions born out of stress, a lack of sleep, or a lack of light."

== Background ==
In an interview with the Los Angeles Review of Books, Iglesias stated that the character of Mario was partly inspired by his own experiences. He wrote portions of The Devil Takes You Home while working as a full-time high school teacher. In June 2020, partly as a result of the COVID-19 pandemic, Iglesias lost both his job and his health insurance. He stated that "I was angry and worried, and I injected all of that into Mario."

== Reception and awards ==
In a starred review, Thane Tierney of BookPage stated that the novel is "spellbinding." The novel has elements of noir fiction, being "rife with bad decisions, many of them lethal." The review compared the book to both Breaking Bad and No Country for Old Men, concluding that it is a "brawny, serpentine and remarkably poignant novel." Ilana Masad of NPR wrote that the inclusion of various supernatural elements heightens both the novel's horror and its social commentary. The review praised the novel's tone, concluding that it "may not be a cheerful book, but it still allows glimpses of love, moments of connection, and glimmers of beauty to exist." Publishers Weekly wrote that Iglesias "effectively portrays Mario’s fragile mental state" and praised the worldbuilding. The review warned readers to prepare for extreme violence and passages of untranslated Spanish. It concluded by stating that the book would be enjoyable for fans of "creepy but emotionally deep action novels." Daniel A. Olivas of the Los Angeles Review of Books stated that The Devil Takes You Home "inarguably establishes Gabino Iglesias as one of our most innovative, exhilarating, and gifted novelists."

Tobias Carroll of Reactor praised the way in which Iglesias "parcels out information," allowing for slow reveals of each character's motivations. Carroll further praised the characterization, stating that the major characters in the book are sympathetic but all capable of committing monstrous acts.

Kirkus Reviews praised the prose and the use of Spanish dialogue, but felt that the story was "stretched and uneven. Less genre-defiant than genre-dysmorphic, the book never quite settles into a storytelling groove..." Nevertheless, the review felt that readers would enjoy the characters' motivations and the occult elements of the book.

Jeff Salamon of Texas Monthly criticized the novel for excessive gore and lack of suspense between action sequences. Salamon further criticized the prose, which could be "clunky" and break the reader's immersion. Despite this, the review felt that the plot twist at the end was "pitch-perfect" and that Mario's rage against racism was a high point of the book.

Year	Award	Category	Result	Ref.
2022	Bram Stoker Award	Novel	Won	
2022	Shirley Jackson Award	Novel	Won	
2023	Dragon Award	Horror Novel	Nominated	
2023	Locus Award	Horror Novel	Finalist	
