= Rose O'Keefe =

American horror publisher

- Known for: Eraserhead Press

Rose O'Keefe is an American horror publisher.

== Biography ==
Rose O'Keefe attended Smith University where she graduated with a degree in English literature. In 1999 she set up Eraserhead Press. The publishing house has had more than 300 titles. O'Keefe also hosts monthly gatherings in Oregon, she lives in Portland. The publishing house is the center of a genre called Bizarro fiction. There is a related annual convention called BizarroCon. She has been the programming chair of the 2014 World Horror Convention. Her press won the 2017 Specialty Press Award from the Horror Writers Association.
