= Alexandr v tramvaji =

- Author: Pavel Řezníček
- Language: Czech
- Publication date: 1994
- Publication place: Czech Republic
- Media type: Print (Hardback & Paperback)

Alexandr v tramvaji is one of the best-known works of author Pavel Řezníček.

It depicts a man named Alexandre whose job as the "razorman" (žiletkář) travels in a trolley and cuts women's feet with a razor he holds in his boot.

== Plot ==
The story presents many characters, including Madame Tussaud who wishes to gain weight in order to bring the police presidium to crumble down into hell, Alexander's portagé, Primář Karlach, the evil philosopher-doctor, who was deposed from his hospital and has returned; Countess Willma, a wealthy countess from a somewhat surrealist estate (e.g. the furniture in the upper floor has been burning for 200 years and there are strange things, like cigarettes in the sky) and a whole ensemble of wax dummies of historical people.

As Řezníček uses his traditional style of writing, it is nearly impossible to follow the line of events, because he often interrupts the descriptions of situations with intermezzos, such as (from another work) "a women is spinache" ("žena je špenát") around which numerous later sentences are based, showing what something is and what something else is not (this line is also special in his work, as un-traditionally it is referred and debated on the following pages as well, unlike his classic form of showing many such proclamations upon another). These types of sentences are often illogical and often they fail to actually have a point, therefore much of them are just plain descriptions (in the style of "Man on the ground" only expanded with numerous other words).

The events of this book lead through various unconnected situations up to Řezníčeks classic ending, in which all the characters are brought into one place and taken care of (another such ending was in his book Strop, in which all the characters, one by one were brought into the "swamps for blind", where they stayed), this time before a tribunal from which they escape.

Another part of Řezníček's writing is the usage of himself in his novels, describing himself in the first, but also in the third person ("Řežníček, ten ......ďábel", "Řezníček that......devil...."). He frequently breaks the fourth wall by insulting the readers or the book or supremely praising them (both may occur in the same book).
