= Dr. Identity =

2007 novel by D. Harlan Wilson

Dr. Identity, or, Farewell to Plaquedemia
- Author: D. Harlan Wilson
- Cover artist: Morten Bak
- Language: English
- Series: Book 1 in The Scikungfi Trilogy
- Genre: Science fiction, Fantasy, Horror, Metafiction, Irrealism, Bizarro, Postmodernism
- Publisher: Raw Dog Screaming Press
- Publication date: 2007
- Publication place: USA
- Media type: Print
- Pages: 212
- ISBN: 1-933293-32-2
- OCLC: 122932539
- Preceded by: Pseudo-City
- Followed by: Blankety Blank: A Memoir of Vulgaria

Dr. Identity (2007) is the fourth book and first novel by American novelist D. Harlan Wilson. It is the first novel in the Scikungfi Trilogy along with the forthcoming Codename Prague (2009) and The Kyoto Man (2010).

== Plot ==
Set in a dystopian, mediatized future where people surrogate themselves with android lookalikes, the novel focuses on the foils of an English professor (Dr. 'Blah), his psychotic android (Dr. Identity), and their flight from the agents of the Law, especially the "Papanazi." Like much of Wilson's work, Dr. Identity is distinguished by its ultraviolence, metanarration, and critique of media technology.

== Reception ==
Dr. Identity received positive reviews from critics. James Maddox of Sussurus said "more than a tale of science fiction, like any good science fiction story is, Wilson exposes the truth of why we keep going back to the same old narrative concepts, then destroys that truth by creating something completely original". An editor of The Horror Review rated it 3.5 stars, saying "the pace at which Dr. Identity erupts is a challenge to maintain, but Wilson does so with style and grace".
