= Pavel Řezníček =

Czech writer and poet (1942–2018)

- Born: 30 January 1942; Blansko, Czechoslovakia (now Czech Republic)
- Died: 19 September 2018 (aged 76); Prague, Czech Republic
- Occupations: Writer, poet, translator

Pavel Řezníček (30 January 1942 – 19 September 2018) was a Czech writer and surrealist poet. In addition to his writing career, he was also a translator from French, including works by Joyce Mansour, Ambroise Vollard, Benjamin Péret and others. He finished secondary school in 1959. From 1965 onwards, he held several manual jobs. In the 1970s, he moved to Prague, where he retired in 2002.

== Bibliography ==
Many of Řezníček's books were first published outside of (then) Czechoslovakia, before coming into print in his home country.

Poetry

- Blbec, 1986 (L'Imbécile)
- Kráter Resnik a jiné básně, 1990
- Tabákové vejce, 1991
- Plovací sval, 1995
- Hrozba výtahu, 2001
- Atentát ve vaně, 2002
- Kakodémonický kartáč, 2006

Prose

- Strop, outside Czechoslovakia 1983, in Czechoslovakia 1991
- Vedro, 1993
- Zvířata, 1993
- Alexandr v tramvaji, 1994
- Zrcadlový pes, 1994
- Cerf volant, 1995
- Holič a boty, 1997
- Natrhneš nehtem hlavy jejich, 2003

Works dedicated to the Brno underground

- Hvězdy kvelbu, 1992
- Popel žhne, 1996
- Blázny šatí stvol, 1998

Works in English

- "Watches" (story) in The Cafe Irreal
