= The Cafe Irreal =

Internet journal

- Discipline: Literary journal
- Language: English

Publication details
- History: 1998 - present
- Frequency: Quarterly

Standard abbreviations
- ISO 4: Cafe Irreal

Indexing
- ISSN: 1931-6763

Links
- Journal homepage

The Cafe Irreal is an Internet journal dedicated to the publication and propagation of irrealist literature.

== History and profile ==
Online since 1998, it has published a number of notable authors whose work sometimes fits into this non-realist genre, such as Charles Simic, Ignacio Padilla, Elaine Vilar Madruga, and Pavel Řezníček. It has published a number of authors in translation, especially from Spanish and (as it is partially based in Prague) from Czech. In this connection, translations that have originally appeared in The Cafe Irreal have been included in the Norton anthology Sudden Fiction Latino and Litteraria Pragensia's The Return of Král Majáles: Prague's International Literary Renaissance 1990-2010.

In 2008, the coeditors of The Cafe Irreal were nominated for a World Fantasy Special Award—Non-professional for their work on the journal, and in that same year the journal was named one of the 25 best places to get published online by Writer's Digest magazine.

According to the back cover blurb on its 15th anniversary print anthology (November 2013), the publication had published stories by more than 250 authors from over 30 different countries.

== See also ==
- Irrealism (the arts)

== Sources ==
- Evans, G.S. and Alice Whittenburg, "After Kafka: Kafka Criticism and Scholarship as a Resource in an Attempt to Promulgate a New Literary Genre," Journal of the Kafka Society of America, 31/32(1+2):18-26.
- Evans, G.S. and Alice Whittenburg, (eds.), The Irreal Reader: Fiction & Essays from The Cafe Irreal, Bowie, MD: Guide Dog Books, 2013, ISBN 978-1935738-34-3.
