= Gabino Iglesias =

American author, editor, and literary critic

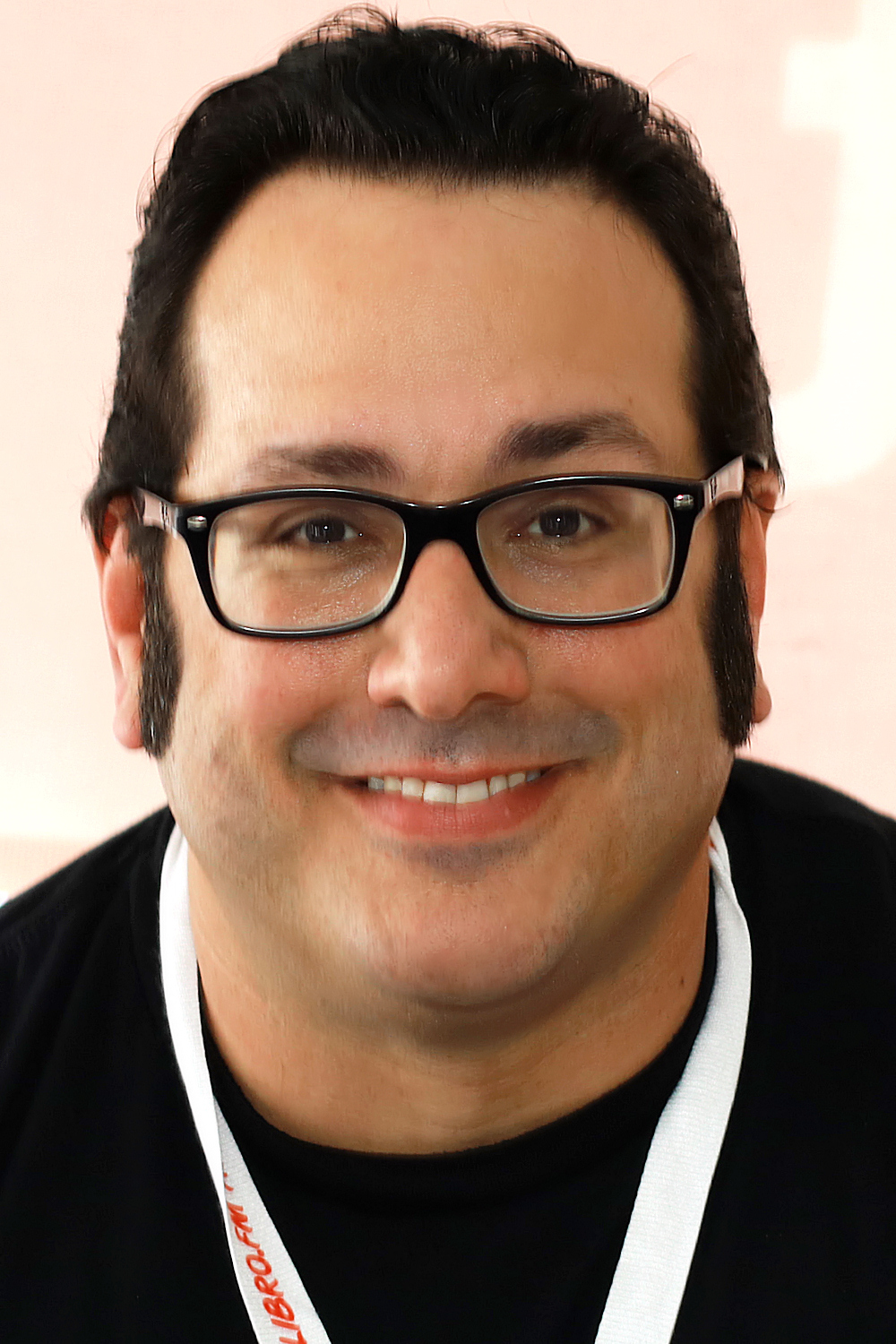
- Iglesias at the 2024 Texas Book Festival
- Born: Puerto Rico
- Education: University of Puerto Rico; University of Texas at Austin
- Occupation: Author
- Writing career
- Genre: Horror fiction
- Notable awards: Bram Stoker Award for Best Novel (2022); Shirley Jackson Award for Best Novel (2022)
- Movement: Barrio noir

Gabino Iglesias is an author of horror fiction, as well as an editor and literary critic. His novel The Devil Takes You Home won the Shirley Jackson Award and Bram Stoker Award. His fiction has been described as "barrio noir," often incorporating elements of noir fiction as well as political commentary about the Mexico–United States border.

== Early life and education ==
Iglesias is from Puerto Rico. In 1999, he began writing a story about revenge. After the success of his novel The Devil Takes You Home, he developed this story into the novel The House of Bone and Rain, which was published in 2024.

English is Iglesias's second language. In an interview with NPR, Iglesias stated: "I didn't speak a word of it until I was, like, in sixth or seventh grade." Iglesias moved to the contiguous United States in 2008 and began writing in English at that time.

Iglesias holds a bachelor's degree in business and an MA in journalism from the University of Puerto Rico. He later graduated from the University of Texas at Austin with a PhD in journalism.

== Literary career ==
In an interview with Nightmare Magazine, Iglesias stated that he first began to read bizarro fiction in about 2007. His first published novel, 2012's Gutmouth, was part of the bizarro genre. He then wrote Zero Saints, which he described as a difficult and emotional task. When he needed a break, he wrote a "palate cleanser" which eventually became Hungry Darkness.

His novels have been described as "barrio noir." Ilana Masad wrote about Iglesias's 2022 novel The Devil Takes You Home and its relationship to noir fiction, quoting Iglesias who describes "barrio noir" as "any writing that walks between languages, borders, and cultures [and] that occupies a plethora of interstitial spaces and isn't afraid to engage with all religions and superstitions as well as to bring in supernatural elements." Masad further situates Iglesias's writing in the modern world, describing its relationship to migrant deaths along the Mexico–United States border, the curtailing of reproductive rights by the Supreme Court of the United States, and mass shootings in the United States, among other issues.

As of 2022, Iglesias teaches creative writing at an online MFA program for Southern New Hampshire University. In 2023, he joined the faculty of the UC Riverside Low Residency MFA Program as a visiting assistant professor.

== Personal life ==
As of 2019, Iglesias is based in Austin, Texas.

== Publications ==
=== As author ===
- Gutmouth. Eraserhead Press. 2012. ASIN B00BEPHW88.
- Hungry Darkness. Severed Press. 2015. ISBN 9781925342154.
- Zero Saints. Broken River Books. 2015. ISBN 9780316584739.
- Coyote Songs. Broken River Books. 2018. ISBN 9781940885490.
- The Devil Takes You Home. Mulholland Books. 2022. ISBN 9780316426916.
- House of Bone and Rain. Mulholland Books. 2024. ISBN 9780316427012.

=== Anthology appearances ===
- Steph Cha; Alafair Burke, eds. (2021). "Everything Is Going to Be Okay". The Best American Mystery and Suspense 2021. Mariner Books. ISBN 9780358525691.
- Vince A. Liaguno; Rena Mason, eds. (2022). "There's Always Something in the Woods". Other Terrors: An Inclusive Anthology. William Morrow. ISBN 9780358658894.
- S.D. Vassallo; Steven M. Long, eds. (2022). "What the Night Swallows". Were Tales: A Shapeshifter Anthology. Brigid’s Gate Press. ISBN 9781957537153.
- Doug Murano, ed. (2022). "Haunted Inside". The Hideous Book of Hidden Horrors. Bad Hand Books. ISBN 9780578287553.
- Mark Matthews, ed. (2022). "Holding On". Orphans of Bliss: Tales of Addiction Horror. Wicked Run Press. ISBN 9781736695043.
- S.J. Rozan, ed. (2023). "What They Knew". Crime Hits Home: A Collection of Stories from Crime Fiction's Top Authors. Hanover Square Press. ISBN 9781335449474.
- Alan Lastufka; Kristina Horner, eds. (2023). "One Thing at a Time". Obsolescence: A Dark Sci-Fi, Fantasy, and Horror Anthology. Shortwave Media. ISBN 9781959565000.
- Ai Jiang; Christi Nogle, eds. (2023). "Tiny Hearts in the Dark". Wilted Pages: An Anthology of Dark Academia. Shortwave Media. ISBN 9781959565116.
- Christopher Golden; Brian Keene, eds. (2024). "Blue Lightning". The Drive-In: Multiplex. Pandi Press. ASIN B0CW1BKT2F.
- Christopher Golden; Brian Keene, eds. (2025). "The Hope Boat". The End of the World as We Know It: New Tales of Stephen King's The Stand. Gallery Books. ISBN 9781668057551.

=== As editor ===
- Gabino Iglesias, ed. (2020). Both Sides: Stories from the Border. Agora Books. ISBN 9781947993877.
- Andrew Cull; Gabino Iglesias, eds. (2022). Found: An Anthology of Found Footage Horror Stories. Vermillion 2 One. ASIN B0BB6GQDW1.
- Andrew Cull; Gabino Iglesias, eds. (2024). Found 2: More Stories of Found Footage Horror. Vermillion 2 One. ISBN 9780648731566.

== Awards and honors ==
Year	Work	Award	Category	Result	Ref.
2018	Coyote Songs	Bram Stoker Award	Collection	Nominated	
2019	Coyote Songs	Locus Award	Horror Novel	Finalist	
2020	"Beyond the Reef"	Bram Stoker Award	Long Fiction	Nominated	
2022	The Devil Takes You Home	Bram Stoker Award	Novel	Won	
2022	The Devil Takes You Home	Shirley Jackson Award	Novel	Won	
2023	The Devil Takes You Home	Dragon Award	Horror Novel	Nominated	
2023	The Devil Takes You Home	Locus Award	Horror Novel	Finalist	
2023	The Devil Takes You Home	Edgar Award	Best Novel	Finalist	
2024	Found 2: More Stories of Found Footage Horror	Aurealis Award	Anthology	Finalist (Note: Nominated as editor; with Andrew Cull)	
2024	House of Bone and Rain	Bram Stoker Award	Novel	Nominated	
2025	House of Bone and Rain	Locus Award	Horror Novel	Finalist	
2025	—N/a	Ignyte Award	Critics Award	Finalist	
2026	—N/a	Ignyte Award	Critics Award	Finalist	
