= Technologized Desire =

2009 book of literary and cultural criticism by D. Harlan Wilson

Technologized Desire: Selfhood & the Body in Postcapitalist Science Fiction
- Author: D. Harlan Wilson
- Cover artist: almacan & Brandon Duncan
- Language: English
- Genre: Science fiction, Literary criticism, Cultural theory, Literary theory, Film studies
- Publisher: Guide Dog Books
- Publication date: 2009
- Publication place: United States
- Media type: Print
- Pages: 207 pp
- ISBN: 978-1-933293-73-8

Technologized Desire: Selfhood & the Body in Postcapitalist Science Fiction (2009) is a book of literary and cultural criticism by American author D. Harlan Wilson. The book analyzes the evolution of technology, the self, subjectivity, culture, commodity fetishism and capitalism as it has been represented by postmodern science fiction novels and films. Ultimately Wilson points to a postcapitalist subjectivity that is an extension of technocapitalism.

== Table of Contents ==
- Terminal Constructedness & the Technology of the Self: Vanilla Sky
- Gongs of Violence, Pathological Play: The Cut-Ups
- Schizosophy of the Medieval Dead: Army of Darkness
- Capitalizm Unbound: Jennifer Government
- Terminal Choice: The Matrix Trilogy

== Reception ==
The book received reviews from the Journal of the Fantastic in the Arts, The Journal of the Midwest Modern Language Association, and Science Fiction Studies. Extrapolation also reviewed the work, stating that "selection of primary texts is doubly the strongest aspect of the book - because of the individual choices and because of the way in which they intersect with and complement each other."
