= David S. Garnett =

UK science fiction author and editor (born 1947)

David Stanley Garnett (born 1947) is a UK science fiction author and editor. His first novel, Mirror in the Sky, was published in 1969. Three of his books are comic science fiction novels: Stargonauts, Bikini Planet and Space Wasters. He edited a paperback anthology revival of Michael Moorcock's New Worlds magazine, two Zenith anthologies of original British SF stories, and three Orbit Science Fiction Yearbooks. He also writes under the names David Ferring and David Lee.
