= Space Hacks =

British radio sitcom

Space Hacks is a British radio sitcom produced by the BBC, first aired in February 2007. It was the first direct commission by BBC7, a UK digital radio station. Two series of four episodes each were produced. All episodes were exclusively broadcast on BBC7.

The series follows the adventures of journalists Charlie Palmer and Moog Johnson, who report on Earth events for pan-galactic news agency InterGalactic News. They are based aboard the IGN Indolent, which sits on Clapham Common disguised as a hedge.

The third principal character is 'Mother' (played by Prunella Scales), the ship's maternal and senile on-board computer. Describing her in episode one, Charlie explains that; "...when they uploaded her baking software they sort of overwrote everything else." Although an exemplary cook, 'Mother' struggles with certain activities such as remembering to tell Charlie and Moog when pirates are approaching, or landing the ship.

Lizard-like alien Korg is the IGN's news editor, and appears to be permanently enraged, especially with Charlie. There is a running joke throughout the series that he always threatens to rip off parts of Charlie and Moog's anatomy and beat them with it. "I shall flail you with your own spines!" is an example.

== Episodes ==
=== Series One ===
- Episode one "Lost in Space Ship": First broadcast 10 February 2007
- Episode two "Two Men and a Baby Alien": First broadcast 17 February 2007
- Episode three "The Last Postman": First broadcast 24 February 2007
- Episode four "Mutiny on the Space Ship": First broadcast 3 March 2007

=== Series Two ===
- Episode five "Men in Brown": First broadcast 1 March 2008
- Episode six "The Quite Good Escape": First broadcast aired 8 March 2008
- Episode seven "Empire in the Sun": First broadcast 15 March 2008
- Episode eight "Back to the Present": First broadcast 22 March 2008

Space Hacks is written by Stuart Sumner and Ian Simons, and is produced by Victoria Lloyd.

== Press ==
The series received some press attention, with positive reviews. While the Radio Times compared the show favourably to other notable radio sitcoms, The Hitchhiker's Guide to the Galaxy, and Red Dwarf, it was also criticised for its resemblance to those same shows and for its decision to use a continuous background drone noise-track that affected people of limited hearing.
