= Jeff Burk =

American author and editor

- Born: June 6, 1984 (age 42); Lancaster, Pennsylvania, U.S.
- Education: Indiana University of Pennsylvania
- Occupation: Novelist
- Writing career
- Genres: Bizarro fiction, humor, science fiction, horror
- Literary movement: Bizarro fiction
- Website: jeffburk.wordpress.com

Jeff Burk (born June 6, 1984) is an American author and editor of Bizarro and horror fiction, currently living in Portland, Oregon. His writing is characterized by the use of humor mixed with extreme violence and gore.

== Background ==
Jeff Burk was born in Lancaster, Pennsylvania. He attended the Indiana University of Pennsylvania where he studied political science, sociology, and history. In 2008 he moved to Portland, Oregon where he became involved in the Bizarro fiction literary movement.

== Writing and publishing ==
Burk is best known for his short novel Shatnerquake which is about the actor William Shatner battling the various fictional characters he has played over the years. The book was widely praised by a variety of media outlets including The Guardian, Boing Boing, and The Portland Mercury. The book has been held up as an example of how independent publishing and internet marketing can reach new audiences.

On March 1, 2010, his second book, Super Giant Monster Time!, was released.

He is the editor-in-chief of The Magazine of Bizarro Fiction, a quarterly print magazine dedicated to publishing "the very best of the Bizarro genre."

He is also the head editor of Deadite Press, Eraserhead Press' cult horror imprint.

Burk is also the host of JEFF ATTACKS! Podcast. The Podcast has mixed reviews on Apple Podcasts, with a rating of 3 stars and only 2 reviewers.

== Political and social activism ==
While attending the Indiana University of Pennsylvania, Burk became heavily involved in political activism. His actions were focused on the issues of anti-war, feminism, LGBT rights, worker's rights, and drug law reform. He has been quoted in a numbered of national news sources regarding his political work, including the Pittsburgh Post Gazette, Fort Collins Now, and others.

Burk is an advocate for the liberalization of copyright laws and a supporter of file-sharing. He has offered his books and magazines for free download via his website and has leaked his work to various P2P outlets (most notably torrent sites). In response to making his work available for free he said:

The internet has allowed us all so many opportunities to share with each other. To resist this is to resist the future. Others may attempt to block this forward progression with lawsuits and file protection. I, instead, want to do what I can to contribute to this wonderful digital community.

== Bibliography ==
Fiction

- Shatnerquake (2009)
- Super Giant Monster Time (2010)
- Cripple Wolf (2011)
- Shatnerquest (2013)

As editor

- The Magazine of Bizarro Fiction (editor from 2009 to 2012)
- The Journal of Experimental Fiction #37 (guest editor with Eckhard Gerdes)
