= Frédéric Iriarte =

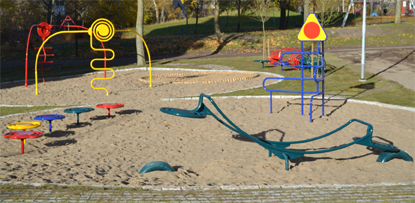
Project ARTOTEC [art & technology] by Frédéric Iriarte, Spirel 1, recreational sculptures and urban furniture. Place Fittja, Stockholm, Sweden (2010)

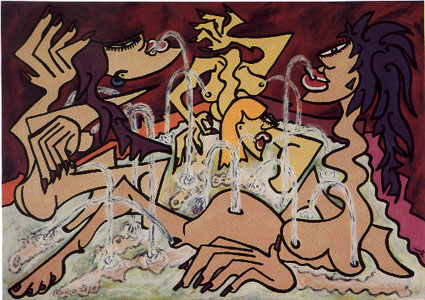
Fontaine aux plaisirs, oil on canvas 100 x 140 cm (1991)

Frédéric Iriarte (born 1963 in Paris), is a contemporary plastic artist. Since 1986, he has lived and worked in Sweden.

In the 1980s he belonged to the avant-garde movement Figuration Libre fr:Figuration libre and presented his works, among others, Galerie Beaubourg, the Marianne and Pierre Nahon Gallery and the Centre Georges Pompidou and the Museum of Modern Art City of Paris. It was during his travels, known and worked with a number of graffiti artists, performance artists, videos, films, photographers and musicians such as Ben Vautier, Herve Di Rosa, Richard Di Rosa, fr:Speedy Graphito, fr:Jerome Mesnager, sv:Kjartan Slettemark, Bengt Lindström, Kaj and Ficaja , Brain and others .

On his arrival in Sweden, perilous road hitchhiking in January 1986, he designed sets for theater groups such as avant-garde Aurora Teater Hilda Hellwig, Claes Peter Hellwig Stockholm for example.

His works have been recognized mainly through its projects, exhibitions, TV interviews, newspaper articles, art critics and bibliographic editions of books and art book éditions. ..

What he calls "The parasiting of the art in the environment, architecture and design have to act and react a large number of spectators and actors in the world of art , . By means of a formal proposal for construction of ventilation tower around the perimeter highway north of Stockholm, the State Council's infrastructure Sweden (K-Konsult) showed an open mind and novelty and innovation and dynamism.

His approach or intrusion on the eight water towers in the Stockholm area, the same year or Stockholm was European Capital of Culture in 1998, also shows that art can be applied to different materials and architectural and sociological support.

The interference of design is evident, inter alia, through action in collaboration with Philippe Starck's representative in Scandinavia and leads to "Porteur-Porteuse" table shown in numerous television programs and international contemporary art fairs.

Design concept : Bottle Wine Muscat de Rivesaltes Castle Pines Vespeille the "Parasite Climber" also had its glory.

It was for three years, responsible for the Scandinavian Association of Artists in Stockholm (KC-Konstnärscentrum). He also teaches at the Art and Technique, or Color and the Shape in the field of industrial design at the KTH The Royal Institute of Technology in Stockholm, or even on the 2D design tools at the University of Södertörn Stockholm.

His works are represented in collections both public and private, throughout Europe and the United States. From the Saatchi Gallery in London until the exclusive offices of large international companies, embassies of France, Institute and Cultural Center of Scandinavia, Stockholm, Oslo, Copenhagen, Stavanger, Helsinki see [public orders] to the offices of the Ministry of Culture and Foreign Affairs in Paris (AFAA office Max Moulin)

== Works and exhibitions ==
Public Commissions

- 1995 Embassy of France, Stockholm, Oslo, Copenhagen, Stavanger, Helsinki.
- 1998 "EVOLUTION" concrete sculpture, entrance Turringe School, Nykvarn (Sweden).
- 2001 "Wings portable" entrance KTH-Syd (Royal Institute of Technology, University College Södertörn, Södertälje (Sweden)).
- 2002 "Illusion" mural Sabatsberg Hospital (Sweden).
- 2008 "Sculpture Recreational Park with Art & Technology" Geneta center, Södertälje-Stockholm (Sweden)
- 2010 "Spirel 1 Recreational Park with Art & Technology" Fittja, Stockholm (Sweden)
- 2011 Recreational sculptures at the "Parc des expositions", Porte de Versailles in Paris (France).

Represented:

- Centre Georges Pompidou, Musee d'Art Moderne of the City of Paris,
- French Institute in Stockholm, Oslo, Copenhagen, Stavanger, Helsinki.
- AFAA (French Association for Artistic Action) in Paris.
- Museum Örnsköldsvik (Sweden).
- The city of Sodertalje (Sweden).
- Royal Institute of Technology (Sweden).
- University College of Södertörn, Södertälje (Sweden).
- Sabatsbergs Hospital (Sweden).

Exhibitions and projects:

- 2010 The New Nordic Art, Leadership Foundation, Oslo, (Norway)
- 2008 "Sculpture Park playful art & technology", Geneta (Sweden)
- 2007 Artist in Residence, Perpignan "Sculptures Playful"
- 2005 Centre of Contemporary Art, Väsby "Friendship IV" (Sweden)
- 2004 House of Culture, Järna (Sweden)
- 2002 Museum of Ornskoldsvik. Contemporary Art Centre in Södertälje, Slottsgaleriet Castle Ekeby, Ekerö. (Sweden)
- 2001 "Materialization – Visualization, a world of invention" Contemporary Art Centre in Södertälje. Contemporary Art Center of Trelleborg, Bryggeriet.
- 1998 International Fair of Contemporary Art, Stockholm.
- 1997 Natural Forces Centre of Contemporary Art Väsby, Upplands Väsby (Sweden) Gallery Kretsen, Södertälje. Galleri Danielson, Borgholm. (Sweden)
- 1996 International Fair of Contemporary Art, Stockholm. Tribute to Ilmar Laaban Ilmar Laaban Liljevalchs konsthall, Stockholm.
- 1995 The Cry Of Gods French Institute, Copenhagen (Denmark). French Institute, Helsinki (Finland). Galleri Pelin, Helsinki (Finland) Centre Franco-Norwegian, Stavanger (Norway). French Institute, Oslo (Norway). Galleri Lundmark, Täby. (Sweden).

Project on water towers "Drop" 8 water towers chosen as support for action on plastic architecture representing a family of trolls "to Rosenlund, Södertälje (Sweden).

- 1994 The Fair of the Church "A Space People" contribution of an ossuary transparent (Sweden)

The Fruit of Thinking Castle Vespeille pines, Rivesaltes. Creating a Muscat wine-Parasite Climber.

- 1993 A tale of two towers proposed development of ventilation towers over 60 meters for the Perimeter Highway Stockholm. Competition in collaboration with the advice of State infrastructure K-Konsult.

Editing table "Carrier-Carrier", T-shirts Men Parasite "och" Female Parasite ". "Impossible" Art Gallery & Form, Stockholm. (Sweden)

- 1991 Spring Show Liljevalchs Museum, Stockholm Book Fair, Gothenburg
- 1990 Art on Paper House of Culture, Stockholm. Music-video, Visninger French Institute in Stockholm and Video-Art Festival Perpignan. "Unreality" French Institute, Stockholm
- 1989 International Fair of Contemporary Art, Stockholm.
- 1986 Scenography for the play called Fritt Fall Theatre Aurora, Stockholm
- 1985 Boris Vian Foundation, Eus and Paris.

Books published:

- 2010 "IBS Theorem (Bicentric Spiral of IRIARTE) with texts by Pehr Sallstrom (Professor of Physics at the University of Stockholm), Frédéric Iriarte (former teacher at KTH and the University of Södertörn, founder ARTOTEC). Irrealistic Art Edition ISBN 978-91-978337-0-7
- 2009 "Between Dream and Reality, A Universe of Art & Technology: Artotec with" design and with artistical touch ...Irrealistic Art Edition ISBN 978-91-978337-1-4
- 2008 "Thinking about the economy in history" with texts by Oskar Broberg, Didrik Wachenfeldt – Irrealistic Art book Edition – JAK Banken, Frédéric Iriarte Irrealistic Art Edition ISBN 978-91-633-3159-6
- 2008 "The Bible of the singular art" Artension / Paper Art. ISBN 978-2-35532-022-4
- 2001 "Materialization – Visualization; a World of Inventions" with texts of Pehr Sällström, (writer, Professor of Physics at the University of Stockholm, Professor of Philosophy.). Irrealistic Art Edition ISBN 91-631-0588-8
- 1995 "Irrealism" with texts by Catherine Huber (intenedent at the Musée d'Art moderne de la Ville de Paris), Ilmar Laaban (poet, writer, art critic) and Lars Kollberg art critic / chief editor of Konsttidningen . Irrealistic Art Edition ISBN 91-630-2304-0
- 1990 "Unreality" with texts by Jean-Jacques Victor (Cultural Attache), and Jacques Queralt (art critic / art teacher at School of Fine Arts of Perpignan).
