= Voyage Trekkers =

- Genre: Comedy Sci Fi
- Starring: Adam Rini; Gabrielle Van Buren; Logan Blackwell
- Original language: English
- No. of seasons: 2
- No. of episodes: 20

Production
- Producer: Nathan Blackwell
- Production location: Phoenix, Arizona
- Running time: 1- 10 minutes

Original release
- Network: Blip
- Release: July 9, 2011 – September 28, 2013

Voyage Trekkers is an American comedy web series created by director Nathan Blackwell and co-writer Craig Michael Curtis. The series is broadcast on the internet and premiered on 9 July 2011. The webseries spanned 2 seasons and in 2018 a TV episode was released. The show can be found distributed across the web including on Blip and YouTube. Voyage Trekkers is a comedy web series about a hopeless starship crew in the Galactic Union and has been described as a successful parody of sci-fi shows such as Star Trek or by its director as a 'love letter to sci-fi situations and genre conventions'. Led by the charismatic but self-centered Captain Sunstrike (Adam Rini), with the help of the apathetic first officer Commander Powell (Logan Blackwell), and the exasperated Doctor Rena (Gabrielle Van Buren), they seek to climb their way up the space adventure ladder.

== History ==
The series was inspired by director Nathan Blackwell and co-writer Craig Michael Curtis. Nathan graduated from South Mountain High School in Phoenix in TV & Communications, and then attended Scottsdale Community College's Film Production, where he made his feature film debut with "Forever Midnight". His second feature film 'no budget' was adapted from the award-winning play written by his brother, Logan Blackwell, "The Constant Epiphanies of Billy The Blood Donor." Nathan Blackwell commented, 'Voyage Trekkers came about out of the sheer desire to make something fun. I was balancing several projects at the time, and for whatever reason, I needed to make something that tapped into that childhood energy of when I first picked up a movie camera and made stories about aliens and ray guns.' The second season was funded by an Indiegogo campaign raising $4,056, just over their original target of $4,000 total.

== Season 1 ==
#	Title	Writer(s)	Director(s)	Original airdate
1	"Rescue from the Lizard Men"	Nathan Blackwell	Nathan Blackwell	May 1, 2011
Captain Sunstrike is in the vile clutches of the evil Draudis lizard men and only his faithful crew can rescue him.
2	"Social Network"	Nathan Blackwell	Nathan Blackwell	May 8, 2011
The crew must keep a professional attitude while on an important diplomatic mission.
3	"Birthday Surprise"	Nathan Blackwell	Nathan Blackwell	May 15, 2011
Captain Sunstrike and Commander Powell infiltrate a dangerous enemy compound.
4	"Language Barrier"	Nathan Blackwell	Nathan Stipes	May 22, 2011
Captain Sunstrike gives a warm welcome to the ship's new alien officer Lt. Jayda.
5	"Oh Great Space Crystal"	Nathan Blackwell	Nathan Blackwell	May 29, 2011
The crew encounters a strange new lifeform and attempt to make contact.
6	"Formal Charges"	Nathan Blackwell	Nathan Blackwell	June 6, 2011
Doctor Rena is brought up on charges for disobeying the Captain's orders.
7	"The Clutches of General Kang"	Nathan Blackwell	Nathan Blackwell	June 13, 2011
The crew's fate is held captive by the villainous General Kang ... and their only hope for escape is that they work together.
8	"Phoning It in"	Nathan Blackwell	Nathan Blackwell	June 20, 2011
The Captain delegates responsibilities as he entertains an important diplomatic ambassador.
9	"Fabulous Technology"	Nathan Blackwell	Nathan Blackwell	July 3, 2011
The crew must save an ambassador from being assassinated at an important diplomatic conference.
10	"Many Paths to Eden"	Nathan Blackwell	Nathan Blackwell	July 10, 2011
The crew in the galaxy are on their most important mission ever.

== Season 2 ==
#	Title	Writer(s)	Director(s)	Original airdate
11	"Welcome Aboard"	Nathan Blackwell	Nathan Blackwell	March 14, 2013
The crew of the GSV Remarkable scramble to make the ship presentable as they try to impress Admiral Grissom.
12	"Laser Swords At Dawn"	Nathan Blackwell	Nathan Blackwell	March 21, 2013
Captain Sunstrike squares off against General Kang once again ... in a laser sword duel to the death.
13	"Set Witchcraft To Stun"	Nathan Blackwell	Nathan Blackwell	March 28, 2013
The crew go undercover as aliens while visiting a technologically primitive world.
14	"Junior Ambassadors Of The Galactic Union"	Nathan Blackwell	Nathan Blackwell	April 4, 2013
Terrorists attack the Junior Ambassadors ceremony which leaves Dr. Rena responsible for a group of young children.
15	"Powell's Last Stand"	Nathan Blackwell	Nathan Blackwell	April 11, 2013
Powell faces the ultimate test of his abilities. Will he succeed? (No, probably not so much.)
16	"The Captains Ball"	Nathan Blackwell	Nathan Blackwell	April 18, 2013
Sunstrike reluctantly attends a formal party for Galactic Union Captains, unaware that danger and intrigue are afoot.
17	"Revenge of the Lizard Men" (part 1)	Nathan Blackwell	Nathan Blackwell	April 25, 2013
The crew of the GSV Remarkable face their greatest challenge ever in the first installment of the four-part Season 2 finale, "Revenge of the Lizard Men."
18	"Revenge of the Lizard Men" (part 2)	Nathan Blackwell	Nathan Blackwell	May 2, 2013
In Part 2 of the Season Finale, with Sunstrike a prisoner of the Draudis Lizard Men it falls upon Doctor Rena to lead a rescue party.
19	"Revenge of the Lizard Men" (part 3)	Nathan Blackwell	Nathan Blackwell	May 9, 2013
In Part 3 of the Season Finale, to get back to their ship the crew must blast their way out of the pirate base. That is, if they can ever stop arguing.
10	"Revenge of the Lizard Men" (part 4)	Nathan Blackwell	Nathan Blackwell	May 23, 2013
In the Season 2 Finale, the crew of the GSV Remarkable face their greatest challenge. Escape is not an option ... they must fight.
