= Ilmar Laaban =

Estonian poet and literary critic

- Born: 11 December 1921; Tallinn, Estonia
- Died: 29 November 2000 (aged 78); Stockholm, Sweden
- Education: University of Tartu

Ilmar Laaban (11 December 1921, Tallinn, Estonia – 29 November 2000, Stockholm) was an Estonian poet and literary critic.

== Early life and education ==
Laaban attended the first Tallinn Boys' Gymnasium from 1934 to 1940. In 1939–1940 and 1941–1942 he studied composition and piano at the Tallinn Conservatory. In 1940–1943 Laaban studied Romance languages at the University of Tartu. In 1943, he went to Sweden, fleeing the Occupation of the Baltic states, and continued studying Romance languages and philosophy (1943–1949).

== Career ==
Laaban worked as a lecturer in Stockholm University and was a member of International Association of Art Critics.

Laaban mainly wrote surrealistic poetry and was one of the first poets in Estonia to practice that genre. He also made recordings with poetry and sound, known as "text-sound-compositions", a genre much developed in Sweden during the 60:s and 70:s. He was a prolific creator of palindromes and wrote in both Estonian (4000), Swedish (300), German (300), French (80) and some in Spanish, Italian, and Latin.

He has written essays and articles on art and literature. Also, he has translated many Estonian poet's works into Swedish (e.g. Artur Alliksaar, Betti Alver, Jaan Kaplinski, Viivi Luik, Paul-Eerik Rummo) and German (e.g. Juhan Liiv, Gustav Suits, Jaan Oks, Henrik Visnapuu, Marie Under). He has written critiques and literary works of artists such as Frederic Iriarte, Endre Nemes, Franco Leidi, Rafael Bellange and Lech Rzewuski.

== Works ==
- "Ankruketi lõpp on laulu algus" (1946)
- "Rroosi Selaviste" (1957)
- "Oma luulet ja võõrast" (1990)
- "Marsyase nahk" (1997)
- "Magneetiline jõgi" (2001)
- "Sõnade sülemid ja sülemite süsteemid" (2004)

== Art critic ==
- Frédéric Iriarte (1995). Irréalisation. F. Iriarte. ISBN 91-630-2304-0.
