= Cameron Pierce =

American author of bizarro fiction (born 1988)

Cameron Pierce (born May 23, 1988, Bakersfield, California, United States) is an American author of bizarro fiction currently residing in Portland, Oregon. The Bizarro Starter Kit (Purple) described his work as "Surreal nightmares that are funny, sad, sincere, and violent." His work has been praised by Troma founder Lloyd Kaufman, Piers Anthony, The Guardian, Cracked.com, Details Magazine, New Times, and SF Site. In 2011, his short story collection Lost in Cat Brain Land won the Wonderland Book Award for Best Collection of 2010. Pierce is also the editor of Lazy Fascist Press.

== Bibliography ==
- Shark Hunting in Paradise Garden (2008)
- Ass Goblins of Auschwitz (2009)
- Lost in Cat Brain Land (2010)
- The Pickled Apocalypse of Pancake Island (2010)
- Abortion Arcade (2011)
- Cthulhu Comes to the Vampire Kingdom (2011)
- Gargoyle Girls of Spider Island (2011)
- Die You Doughnut Bastards (2012)
- Fantastic Earth Destroyer Ultra Plus (2013)

=== Anthologies edited ===
- Amazing Stories of the Flying Spaghetti Monster (2011)
- The Best Bizarro Fiction of the Decade (2012)
- In Heaven, Everything is Fine: Fiction Inspired by David Lynch (2013)
