= Kurt Baumeister =

American writer

Kurt Baumeister is an American novelist, essayist, critic, and poet. His writing has appeared in Salon, Guernica, Electric Literature, Rain Taxi, The Brooklyn Rail, The Rumpus, Vol. 1 Brooklyn, The Nervous Breakdown, The Weeklings, The Good Men Project, and other outlets. An acquisitions editor with 7.13 Books, Baumeister holds an MFA in creative writing from Emerson College, and is a member of the National Book Critics Circle and the Authors Guild.

Baumeister is the author of two novels published by Stalking Horse Press: Pax Americana (2017), a satirical thriller set in an alternate near-future America, and Twilight of the Gods (2025), a comic satire drawing on Norse mythology and twentieth-century history. Pax Americana was named a Best Book of 2017 by [PANK] magazine. Twilight of the Gods was named a finalist for the 2025 Big Other Book Award for Fiction.

His fiction has been described as combining literary fiction, surrealism, satire, and slipstream, and has drawn comparisons to the work of Kurt Vonnegut, Martin Amis, and Thomas Pynchon. As a critic, Baumeister has conducted the "Six Ridiculous Questions" interview series for Vol. 1 Brooklyn and edited the "Under the Influence" feature for Entropy. His review column "Review Microbrew" appeared in The Nervous Breakdown.

== Novels ==
=== Pax Americana (2017) ===
Pax Americana (Stalking Horse Press, 2017) is a satirical thriller set in an alternate near-future United States in which George W. Bush wins a third presidential term, American evangelical Christianity has merged with the intelligence apparatus, and a computer program capable of simulating the voice of God threatens the established order. The novel was selected as a Best Book of 2017 by [PANK] magazine and named to Electric Literature's "Great 2017 Indie Press Preview." It received advance praise from novelists including Darin Strauss, Caroline Leavitt, Andrew Shaffer, Matthew Norman, and Chuck Greaves.

Critical reception was broadly positive. The Brooklyn Rail called it "a true triumph," Electric Literature described it as "zestful, remorseless, clear-eyed," Vol. 1 Brooklyn characterized it as "bleak yet bubbly," and Kirkus Reviews noted an "impressively creative blend of political intrigue and sci-fi drama." Writing in The Millions in December 2020, Aatif Rashid described the novel as a "hilarious recreation of the Bush years."

Interviews about Pax Americana were conducted by Caroline Leavitt for her blog, Tobias Carroll for Vol. 1 Brooklyn, and Matt Norman for JMWW. Baumeister also contributed a music playlist essay for the book to Largehearted Boy.

=== Twilight of the Gods (2025) ===
Twilight of the Gods (Stalking Horse Press, March 11, 2025) is Baumeister's second novel. Narrated by Loki, the Norse god of mischief, it follows the Norse pantheon through a non-linear sweep of twentieth and twenty-first century history, centering on a German election threatened by a resurgent far right and Odin's long history of collaboration with fascism. The novel was featured in Reactor magazine's "Can't Miss Indie Press Speculative Fiction for March and April 2025" and Vol. 1 Brooklyn's recommended books for March 2025. It was named a finalist for the 2025 Big Other Book Award for Fiction.

It received advance praise from novelists including Jonathan Evison, Matthew Specktor, Mark Doten, Sequoia Nagamatsu, Amber Sparks, and Iris Smyles.

Critical reception was generally positive. Vol. 1 Brooklyn described it as "a comic noir about a 21st century Ragnarök" and compared Baumeister's approach to Kurt Vonnegut's treatment of serious subjects with a light touch, while Chicago Review of Books called it "a totally bonkers satire." Heavy Feather Review characterized the novel as "a non-linear patchwork of human history," and BULL compared its style to Pynchon's Inherent Vice, framing Loki as "a postmodern hero" whose trickster identity functions as an antidote to authoritarianism. F(r)iction called it "as brutal as it is profound," Bending Genres described it as "so big, so fun, so electric," Bizarro Central praised it as "an entertaining and hilarious page-turning reinterpretation of Norse mythology," and Big Other compared Baumeister to François Rabelais, calling the novel "a sweet and rollicking adventure story." The Brooklyn Rail's full review noted the novel's political prescience while observing that its focus on a fictional Germany occasionally occludes aspects of the American past.

Interviews about Twilight of the Gods were conducted by Jeremy T. Wilson for Chicago Review of Books, Christine Sneed for Brooklyn Rail, Leland Cheuk for Los Angeles Review of Books, and Ben Tanzer for The National Book Review. Baumeister participated in the Lit Hub Author Questionnaire alongside four other authors with new books and contributed a music playlist essay to Largehearted Boy.

== Writing and influences ==
Baumeister has described his fiction as combining literary fiction, surrealism, satire, and slipstream — drawing on science fiction, fantasy, spy fiction, and crime fiction. In interviews he has cited Martin Amis, Kurt Vonnegut, Don DeLillo, Vladimir Nabokov, Milan Kundera, Salman Rushdie, Michael Moorcock, Jeanette Winterson, and Italo Calvino as influences on his work. He has also discussed the influence of Dungeons & Dragons, television, and popular culture on his fiction.

His nonfiction often focuses on American politics and popular culture. An essay on AMC's Mad Men published in Salon in 2015 was later referenced in the academic volume Mad Men: The Death and Redemption of American Democracy (Lexington Books, ISBN 9781498526975). Baumeister curated the "Under the Influence" feature for Entropy, conducted the "Six Ridiculous Questions" interview series for Vol. 1 Brooklyn, and wrote the "Review Microbrew" column for The Nervous Breakdown, in which he reviewed fiction in groups of multiple titles per installment.

== Bibliography ==
=== Novels ===
- Pax Americana. Stalking Horse Press. 2017. ISBN 9780998433943.
- Twilight of the Gods. Stalking Horse Press. 2025. ISBN 978-1960451026.

=== Selected essays and criticism ===
- "'Mad Men' Eulogies: Don Draper, American Anti-Hero." Salon, April 5, 2015.
- "The Book of Loki." Guernica, March 2018.
- "True Detective: Journey to the End of the American Night." The Weeklings, January 31, 2014.
- "Female President? TV Says, 'Definitely, Maybe.'" The Rumpus, May 2, 2015.
- "Scream, Dream, Nightmare." The Weeklings, January 25, 2016.
- "Beware the Ides of Trump." The Weeklings, September 26, 2016.

=== Selected book reviews ===
Baumeister began reviewing books at Electric Literature and subsequently launched the "Review Microbrew" column at The Nervous Breakdown, running to nine or more volumes. He has also published reviews at Brooklyn Rail and Vol. 1 Brooklyn.

- "Review: Station Eleven by Emily St. John Mandel." Electric Literature, 2014.
- "The Sounds of Madness: The Subprimes by Karl Taro Greenfeld." Electric Literature, 2015.
- "Success and Its Trappings: Matt Bell's A Tree or a Person or a Wall." Electric Literature, 2016.
- "The Once and Future Queen: Amber Sparks's Weird Realism." The Brooklyn Rail, February 2020.
- "Reinventing Postmodernism: Charles Yu's Interior Chinatown." Vol. 1 Brooklyn, July 2020.
- "Mark Doten's Trump Sky Alpha." The Brooklyn Rail, June 2019.
- "Matt Bell's Appleseed." The Brooklyn Rail, May 2021.
- "A Resonant History, With Cryptids: On American Mythology by Giano Cromley." Vol. 1 Brooklyn, August 7, 2025.

=== Selected short fiction ===
- "Superman's Last Flight." Literary Orphans, Bruce Issue.
- "The Book of Loki." Guernica, March 2018.
- "The Arena of Love." Vol. 1 Brooklyn, June 10, 2018.
- "Sing a New Song." Vol. 1 Brooklyn, October 31, 2021.
- "Magic Boots." BULL #10, 2023.

== Podcasts ==
Baumeister has appeared as a guest on numerous literary podcasts, including Drinks with Tony (Tony DuShane, Episode 167, December 2021 and a 2025 episode on Twilight of the Gods), This Podcast Will Change Your Life (Ben Tanzer, Episode 221, April 20, 2020 and Episode 355, February 2025), Jamming Their Transmission (John Madera, Episode 17, July 3, 2020), A Vague Idea (Nate Ragolia, with Jonathan Evison, April 6, 2021), Debut Buddies (with Leland Cheuk), Salt Lake Dirt (Episode 302, 2025), The Chills at Will Podcast (Episode 311, 2025), Textual Healing with Mallory Smart (2025), Rabbit Hole of Research (Episode 36, 2025), Teaching Learning Leading K-12 (Steven Miletto, Episode 763, 2025), and Beyond the Zero (2025).
