= Acefest =

Film festival in New York City

- Frequency: Annually
- Location: New York City
- Years active: 2007 - 2010

ACEFEST (American Cinematic Experience Film Festival - formerly known as the ACE Film Festival) is a film festival first held in 2007 in New York City. The festival focuses purely on showcasing domestic films "in an effort to strengthen and promote pride in American independent cinema".

The festival screens premieres of American video art, animation, short films, student films, documentaries and feature films. Band performances, interactive media showcases, games, contests and giveaways are also held.

== 2009 ACEFEST ==
2009 ACEFEST poster.

The 2009 ACEFEST took place July 10–11, 2009, at Tribeca Cinemas in Manhattan's Financial District. While the event was a scaled down iteration of the typically three- to four-day event, it was the fest's most successful to date.

=== Winners ===
- Best Short Film: Open Air – directed by Shira-Lee Shalit
- Best Feature Film: How I Got Lost – directed by Joe Leonard
- Best Documentary Film: Skatopia: 88 Acres of Anarchy – directed by Lauri House
- Audience Choice Award: The Human Experience – directed by Charles Kinnane

=== Judges ===
- Lloyd Kaufman - Director, "Toxic Avenger ", co-founder Troma Entertainment
- Chris Gore - Founder FilmThreat.com, writer "Ultimate Film Festival Survival Guide", G4TV co-host
- Elle Martini - Emmy-nominated writer/director
- Zenon Kruszelnicki - Acting Coach, Willem Dafoe, New York Film Academy
- Gabriele Barrera - Writer, international film critic
- Russell Hess - Distributor/Producer

== 2008 ACE Film Festival ==
2008 ACE Film Festival poster.

The 2008 ACE Film Festival took place from September 4 to the 7th 2008, at New World Stages, 343 West 49th Street, down the street from world-famous Times Square. ACEFest's longtime supporter, New York Foundation for the Arts, held the honor of being the official presenter of that year's event. NYFA, a non-for-profit organization, has supported emerging filmmakers since 1976 and offers a wide variety of programs, including Fiscal Sponsorship, Artists' Fellowships, and NYFA Source.

The final programming included 40 films of all genres and lengths, including video art, animation, music videos, documentaries, and narrative-based shorts and feature-length films. Of all of those, 4 were World Premieres, 10 were East Coast Premieres, and 12 were New York City Premieres.

=== Winners ===
- Best Short Film: Person, Place or Thing – directed by Elle Martini
- Best Feature Film: Remarkable Power! – directed by Brandon Beckner
- Best Documentary Film: Second Skin – directed by Juan Carlos Peneiro
- Audience Choice Award: Looking For Ms.Locklear – directed by Link Neal and Rhett McLaughlin

=== Judges ===
- Murphy Gilson - Producer, PBS, Comedy Central. Two Emmy winner
- William Ericsson Crawley - Founder, WEMA International Talent Agency
- Colin Boyd - Critic, BigPictureRadio.com
- Claudia Jean - PR, HBO, BET, Nickelodeon, MTV, Showtime and TLC
- David Nusair - Critic, Reel Film Reviews
- Jim Connors - Broadcasting, ThinkBright TV Network

== 2007 ACE Film Festival ==
2007 ACE Film Festival poster.

The inaugural ACE Film Festival took place from August 24 to 26 at the Broad Street Ballroom, 41 Broad Street, right in the center of Manhattan's Financial District and in close proximity to the New York Stock Exchange. One of the upper floors on the venue was transformed into "Club Ace", a networking lounge where a variety of activities took place.The independent director Caveh Zahedi, was a guest speaker.

A portion of the festival's ticket proceeds were donated to the New York Foundation for the Arts in an effort to support its efforts in "spreading the gift of creativity." The festival was also part of the River to River Festival, the "largest annual cultural and arts event in New York City's history."

Among the films screened was Robert Liano's and Tom Coppola's A Broad Way, a documentary film shot over the period of one hour by more than 400 filmmakers, dispersed along 258 blocks of New York City's famous Broadway.

=== Winners ===
- Best Short Film: The Doorstep – directed by Brian Paul and Jason Nacey
- Best Feature Film: Little Chenier – directed by Bethany Ashton Wolf
- Best Documentary Film: A Broad Way – directed by Robert Liano and Tom Coppola
- Best Animated Film: The Cocktail Party – directed by Brandon Duncan
