= Ignyte Award – Critics Award =

Annual literary award for speculative fiction

- Awarded for: Critical analysis of speculative fiction works, at either a professional or fan level
- Country: United States
- Presented by: FIYAH Literary Magazine
- First award: 2020; 6 years ago
- Most recent winner: Alex Brown
- Website: ignyteawards.fiyahlitmag.com

The Ignyte Award — Critics Award is a literary award given annually as part of the Ignyte Awards.

== Winners and finalists ==
* Winners

Year	Finalist	Publisher, if applicable:	Ref.
2020	Alex Brown*	Tor.com	
2020	Liz Bourke	—	
2020	Maria Haskins	—	
2020	Jesse	Bowties & Books	
2020	Charles Payseur	Quick Sip Reviews	
2021	Stitch*	Stitch's Media Mix	
2021	Maria Haskins	—	
2021	Jesse	Bowties & Books	
2021	Charles Payseur	Quick Sip Reviews	
2021	A. C. Wise	—	
2022	Alex Brown*	Tor.com	
2022	Arley Sorg	—	
2022	Akilah White	—	
2022	Rich in Color	—	
2022	Thistle & Verse	—	
2023	Nerds of a Feather, Flock Together	—	
2023	Christina Orlando	—	
2023	Charles Payseur	—	
2023	Bogi Takács	—	
2023	Aigner Loren Wilson	—	
2024	Alex Brown*	Tor.com	
2024	The Blerd Library	—	
2024	Bookbaddiebri	—	
2024	Archita Mittra	—	
2024	Aigner Loren Wilson	—	
2025	Maya Gittelman*	—	
2025	Ancillary Review of Books	—	
2025	BlackGayComicGeek	—	
2025	Gabino Iglesias	—	
2025	Archita Mittra	—	
2026	Alex Brown*		
2026	Vanessa Fogg		
2026	Maria Haskins		
2026	Gabino Iglesias		
2026	The Skiffy and Fanty Show		
