= Stranger on the Loose =

2003 book by Harlan Wilson

- Author: D. Harlan Wilson
- Cover artist: Simon Duric
- Language: English
- Genre: Irrealism, Bizarro, Postmodernism
- Publisher: Eraserhead Press
- Publication date: 2003
- Publication place: United States
- Media type: Print
- Pages: 228
- ISBN: 0-9729598-3-1
- OCLC: 54809661

Stranger on the Loose (2003) is the second book by American author D. Harlan Wilson. It contains twenty-seven irreal short stories and flash fiction as well as a novella, "Igsnay Bürdd the Animal Trainer." Pieces in this collection originally appeared in magazines and journals such as Eclectica Magazine, The Dream People, Locus Novus, 3 A.M. Magazine, Jack Magazine, Diagram, Riverbabble and Redsine. The book is illustrated by British storyboard artist Simon Duric.

== Development ==
=== Publication history ===
Stranger on the Loose was published by Eraserhead Press in August 2003.

== Reception ==
A review published in DIAGRAM described the book as "not for everybody" but complimented Wilson's creativity and the length of each story.
