= D. Harlan Wilson =

American novelist (born 1971)

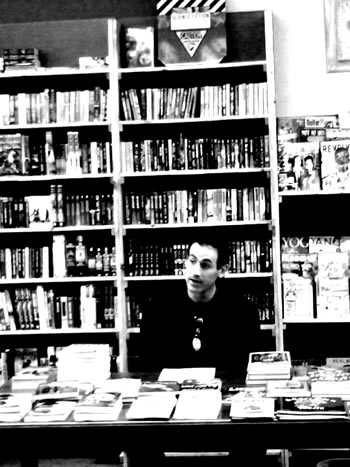
- D. Harlan Wilson reading at Kafe Kerouac in Columbus, Ohio
- Born: September 3, 1971 (age 55); Michigan, United States
- Occupations: Novelist and professor
- Spouse: Christine Junker (m. 2005; div. 2015)
- Children: 2
- Writing career
- Years active: 1999–present
- Period: 1999–present
- Genres: Irrealism, Literary fiction, Science fiction, Fantasy, Horror, Interstitial fiction, Literary criticism, Literary nonsense, Biography, Theatre of the Absurd
- Notable works: Dr. Identity, Peckinpah, The Kyoto Man, Battles without Honor or Humanity
- Website: www.dharlanwilson.com

Signature
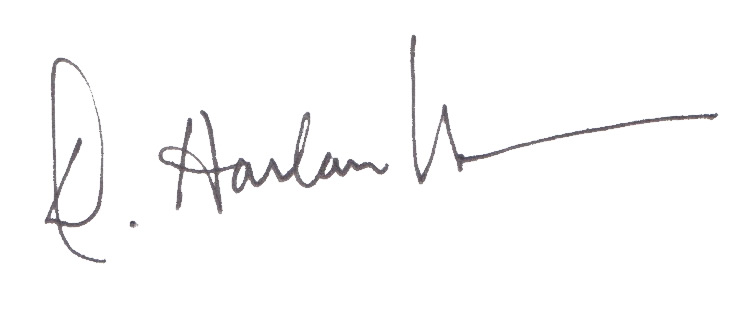

D. Harlan Wilson (born September 3, 1971) is an American novelist, short-story writer, critic, playwright and English professor. His body of work bridges the aesthetics of literary theory with various genres of speculative fiction, with Wilson also being recognized as one of the co-founders of bizarro fiction." Among his books is the award-winning novel Dr. Identity, the two-volume short story collection Battle without Honor or Humanity; monographs on John Carpenter’s They Live, Aflred Bester's The Stars My Destination, and Steven Spielberg's Minority Report; an expansive analysis of "biotexts" written about Philip K. Dick; and a critical study of the life and work of J. G. Ballard.

== Writing ==
Wilson began writing fiction in his early twenties when he took a creative writing course with novelist Patricia Powell while enrolled in graduate school at the University of Massachusetts Boston. He has since published more than 20 books of fiction and nonfiction.

Wilson is perhaps best known for Dr. Identity, described by Booklist as a "madcap, macabre black comedy," and the subsequent Peckinpah: An Ultraviolent Romance, both of which he has fancifully categorized as examples of "splattershtick," a literary, comic, ultraviolent form of metafiction. He is also known for helping create and shape the aesthetics of bizarro fiction, which has been described as a "mélange of elements of absurdism, satire, and the grotesque." Many of his books are published by Raw Dog Screaming Press, a small press specializing in bizarro fiction.

Much of his writing satirizes the idiocy of pop culture and western society, illustrating how "the reel increasingly usurps the real." Taken as a whole, his writing is difficult to quantify and he has been said to defy categorization; some critics have called him "a genre in himself." Publishers Weekly has described his fiction as "testosterone-fueled and intentionally disorienting" which "invokes not a dialogue with the reader but a bare-knuckle fistfight."

In addition to writing fiction, Wilson is a reviewer and essayist being frequently published in places such as the Los Angeles Review of Books, the academic journal Extrapolation, and the Journal of the Fantastic in the Arts.

Wilson is editor-in-chief of Anti-Oedipus Press, reviews editor of Extrapolation and managing editor of Guide Dog Books. He is also emeritus editor-in-chief of The Dream People, a journal focused on bizarro fiction where he previously served as editor-in-chief.

== Academic Work ==
Wilson is Professor of English at the Lake Campus of Wright State University, where he has been teaching since 2006 after receiving his Ph.D. in English from Michigan State University.

Wilson is the author of Modern Masters of Science Fiction: J.G. Ballard from University of Illinois Press. His other academic books include Cultographies: They Live from Columbia University Press, which the San Francisco Book Review called a "scholarly examination of a cult classic still debated today," and Technologized Desire: Selfhood & the Body in Postcapitalist Science Fiction. He has also written a number of scholarly articles on genre fiction along with entries for books such as The Greenwood Encyclopedia of Science Fiction and Fantasy.

== Bibliography ==
=== Auto/Biographies ===
- Hitler: The Terminal Biography (2014)
- Freud: The Penultimate Biography (2014)
- Douglass: The Lost Autobiography (2014)
- Nietzsche: The Unmanned Autohagiography (2023)

=== Plays ===
- Three Plays (2016)
- Jackanape and the Fingermen (2021)

=== Stand-Alone Novels ===
- Blankety Blank: A Memoir of Vulgaria (2008)
- Peckinpah: An Ultraviolent Romance (1st ed. 2009; 2nd ed. 2013)
- Primordial: An Abstraction (2014)
- Outré (2020)

=== The Scikungfi Trilogy ===
- Dr. Identity, or, Farewell to Plaquedemia: Book 1 (2007) — Winner of the Wonderland Book Award
- Codename Prague: Book 2 (2011)
- The Kyoto Man: Book 3 (2013)

=== Fiction Collections ===
- The Kafka Effekt (2001)
- Stranger on the Loose (2003)
- Pseudo-City (2005)
- They Had Goat Heads (2010)
- Diegeses (2013)
- Battle without Honor or Humanity: Vol. 1 (2015)
- Battle without Honor or Humanity: Vol. 2 (2016)
- Battles without Honor or Humanity (2017)
- Natural Complexions (2018)

=== Fiction Theory ===
- The Psychotic Dr. Schreber (2019)
- Usurper: Essays on the Death of Reality (2026)

=== Literary & Film Criticism ===
- Technologized Desire: Selfhood & the Body in Postcapitalist Science Fiction (2009)
- Cultographies: They Live (Columbia University Press, 2015)
- Modern Masters of Science Fiction: J.G. Ballard (University of Illinois Press, 2017)* Constellations: Minority Report (Liverpool University Press, 2022)
- The Stars My Destination: A Critical Companion (Palgrave Macmillan, 2022)
- Strangelove Country: Science Fiction, Filmosophy, and the Kubrickian Consciousness (2025)
- The Auto/Biographies of Philip K. Dick: Infinite Regressions (Routledge, 2026)

== Films ==
- The Cocktail Party (2006): Co-written with director Brandon Duncan, this short, animated, rotoscoped film is a highly abstracted and philosophical (post)postmodern meditation on the narcissistic themes of consumerism, redundant self-analysis and rampant hypocrisy. The film won over ten awards, among them Best Animation at ACE Film Festival.

== Trivia ==
- Wilson is a direct descendant of James Fenimore Cooper and brother-in-law of D I Smith of the band Pilots of Japan.
