= Bizarro fiction =

Literary genre

Bizarro fiction is a contemporary literary genre which often uses elements of absurdism, satire, and the grotesque, along with pop-surrealism and genre fiction staples, in order to create subversive, weird, and entertaining works. The term was adopted in 2005 by the independent publishing companies Eraserhead Press, Raw Dog Screaming Press, and Afterbirth Books. Much of its community revolves around Eraserhead Press, which is based in Portland, Oregon, and has hosted the annual BizarroCon since 2008. The introduction to the first Bizarro Starter Kit describes Bizarro as "literature's equivalent to the cult section at the video store" and a genre that "strives not only to be strange, but fascinating, thought-provoking, and, above all, fun to read."

According to Rose O'Keefe of Eraserhead Press: "Basically, if an audience enjoys a book or film primarily because of its weirdness, then it is Bizarro. Weirdness might not be the work's only appealing quality, but it is the major one."

In general, Bizarro has more in common with speculative fiction genres (such as science-fiction, fantasy, and horror) than with avant-garde movements (such as Dadaism and surrealism), which readers and critics often associate it with. While the genre may place an emphasis on the cult and outré, it is not without critical praise. Books by authors who have identified or have been identified as Bizarro have been praised by Lloyd Kaufman and Michael Moorcock. Bizarro novels have been finalists for the Philip K. Dick Award, the Bram Stoker Award, and the Rhysling Award. A book of Bizarro criticism and theory was named Non-Fiction Book of the Year 2009 by 3:AM Magazine in Paris.

== Origins ==
Bizarro literature can trace its roots at least as far back as the foundation of Eraserhead Press in 1999, but the description of the literature as "Bizarro" is a more recent development. Previous terms used to refer to the burgeoning scene include "irreal" and "new absurdism", but neither of these was used broadly. On 19 June 2005, Kevin Dole II released "What The Fuck is This All About", a sort of manifesto for the then unnamed genre. While the essay does not feature the word "Bizarro," subsequent discussion about the essay led to the name as well as the inauguration of the Mondo Bizarro Forum.

In his essay, "The Nab Gets Posthumously Bizarroized", Tom Bradley traces the genre's roots back in literary history to the time of Vladimir Nabokov's "Gogolization," and his cry of despair and horror at having his central nervous system colonized: "...after reading Gogol, one's eyes become Gogolized. One is apt to see bits of his world in the most unexpected places." Bradley claims the Bizarro movement is continuing and fulfilling that Gogolization process, under the name "Bizarroization": "...we have been completing the preposterous project which [Nabokov] took over from Gogol nearly a hundred years ago.." Bradley further asserts that Bizarro writers can trace their spiritual roots back to the letters which Ovid wrote while exiled on the Black Sea.

== Response ==
Author John Skipp and fellow small press author Eden Robins have written in praise of the do it yourself, self-promoting aesthetic. Thirdeye Magazine, an online zine, reinforces the perception of Bizarro writing as purposefully absurd. In the io9 article "Independent Publishers Who Are Reinventing The Future," co-editor Charlie Jane Anders praised Bizarro publisher Eraserhead Press as one of her favorite independent presses.

The British magazine Dazed & Confused stated that "The bastard sons of William Burroughs and Dr. Seuss, the underground lit cult of the Bizarros are picking up where the cyberpunks left off."

== Wonderland Book Award ==
The Wonderland Book Award honors the best in bizarro fiction each year. The award recognizes two categories: best novel/novella and best short story collection. The award is voted on by bizarro authors and fans, and presented in the fall at BizarroCon.

=== Best Short Story Collection ===
2025: Clairviolence: Tales of Tarot and Torment - Mo Moshaty

2024: The Expectant Mother Disinformation Handbook - Robert Guffey

2023: All I Want Is to Take Shrooms And Listen to the Color of Nazi Screams - John Baltisberger

2022: The Last 5 Minutes of the Human Race - Michael Allen Rose & Jim Agpalza

2021: Don't Push the Button - John Skipp

2020: Don't F[Bleep]k with the Coloureds - Andre Duza

2019: To Wallow in Ash & Other Sorrows - Sam Richard

2018: Nightmares in Ecstasy - Brendan Vidito

2017: Angel Meat - Laura Lee Bahr

2016: Berzerkoids – Emma Alice Johnson

2015: The Pulse Between Dimensions and the Desert – Rios de la Luz

2014: I'll Fuck Anything that Moves and Stephen Hawking – Violet LeVoit

2013: Time Pimp – Garrett Cook

2012: All-Monster Action – Cody Goodfellow

2011: We Live Inside You – Jeremy Robert Johnson

2010: Lost in Cat Brain Land – Cameron Pierce

2009: Silent Weapons for Quiet Wars – Cody Goodfellow

2008: Rampaging Fuckers of Everything on the Crazy Shitting Planet of the Vomit Atmosphere – Mykle Hansen

2007: 13 Thorns – Gina Ranalli

=== Best Novel/Novella ===
2025: Black Brane - Michael Cisco

2024: Nympho Shark Fuck Frenzy - Christine Morgan & Susan Snyder

2023: Edenville - Sam Rebelein

2022: One Hand to Hold, One Hand to Carve - M. Shaw

2021: Jurassichrist - Michael Allen Rose

2020: The Loop - Jeremy Robert Johnson

2019: Unamerica - Cody Goodfellow

2018: Coyote Songs - Gabino Iglesias

2017: Sip - Brian Allen Carr

2016: I Will Rot Without You – Danger Slater

2015: Skullcrack City – Jeremy Robert Johnson

2014: Dungeons & Drag Queens – Emma Alice Johnson

2013: Motherfucking Sharks – Brian Allen Carr

2012: Space Walrus – Kevin L. Donihe

2011: Haunt – Laura Lee Bahr

2010: By the Time We Leave Here, We'll Be Friends – J. David Osborne

2009: Warrior Wolf Women of the Wasteland – Carlton Mellick III

2008: House of Houses – Kevin L. Donihe

2007: Dr. Identity – D. Harlan Wilson

== Notable Bizarro works ==
Most notable Bizarro works generally tend to come from the major Bizarro presses, most notably Eraserhead Press. Although there are many books that have qualities of Bizarro, such as William Burroughs' Naked Lunch or Mark Z. Danielewski's House of Leaves, a Bizarro work tends to be defined by its publication inside of the Bizarro scene, from 2001, when the first Carlton Mellick III book was published, to the present.

Although Bizarro is a DIY genre that gets little media attention, a notable Bizarro work is often one that has broken past the barriers of the genre and received wider attention in literature and media.

Title	Year	Author	Publisher	ISBN	Pages	Notes
Satan Burger	2001	Carlton Mellick III	Eraserhead Press	9780971357235	236	
The Baby Jesus Buttplug	2003	Carlton Mellick III	Eraserhead Press	0972959823	104	
Angel Dust Apocalypse	2005	Jeremy Robert Johnson	Eraserhead Press	0976249839	184	

== Authors ==
- Querus Abuttu
- Andrew Wayne Adams
- David Agranoff
- Forrest Aguirre
- Kirsten Alene Pierce
- Forrest Armstrong
- Michael A. Arnezn
- Ben Arzate
- Brian Auspice
- Steve Aylett
- Laura Lee Bahr
- David W. Barbee
- Duncan B. Barlow
- Edgar J. Barrett
- Maxwell Bauman
- William Bevill
- Amanda Billings
- Vincenzo Bilof
- Jerry Blaze
- Lori Bowen
- Christopher Boyle
- Tom Bradley
- Dave Brockie
- G Arthur Brown
- Cullen Bunn
- Jeff Burk
- Justin A. Burnett
- Hugo Camacho Cabeza
- Leza Canotral
- Lance Carbuncle
- Brian Allen Carr
- Nathan Carson
- Shane T. Cartledge
- Adam Cesar
- Autumn Christian
- Michael Cisco
- Alan M. Clark
- Scott Cole
- Edmund Colell
- John Wayne Comunale
- Brendan Connell
- Garrett Cook
- Jase Daniels
- Nicholas Day
- Rios de la Luz
- Robert Devereaux
- Jaime Dunkle
- Andre Duza
- Russel Edson
- Brian Evenson
- Amber Fallon
- Karl Fischer
- Ben Fitts
- Constance Ann Fitzgerald
- Andy de Fonseca
- Eckhard Gerdes
- Garvan Giltinan
- Larissa Glasser
- J. F. Gonzalez
- Cody Goodfellow
- Matthew T. Granberry
- Devora Gray
- Gerri R. Gray
- Jamie Grefe
- Michael Griffin
- Justin Grimbol
- Nikki Guerlain
- Douglas Hackle
- Mykle Hansen
- Eric Hendrixson
- C.V. Hunt
- Gabino Iglesias
- Alex S. Johnson
- Emma Alice Johnson
- Jeremy Robert Johnson
- Kirk Jones
- Stephen Graham Jones
- Michael Kazepis
- David James Keaton
- Mike Kleine
- John Edward Lawson
- Michael Sean LeSueur
- Edward Lee
- Christopher Lesko
- Marc Levinthal
- D. F. Lewis
- Simon Logan
- Kelby Losack
- Steve Lowe
- Tom Lucas
- Nick Mamatas
- Spike Marlowe
- Eric Mays
- Shane McKenzie
- Chris Meekings
- Carlton Mellick III
- Adam Millard
- Brent Millis
- Jonathan Moon
- Christine Morgan
- Charles Austin Muir
- Kyle Muntz
- Nisio Isin
- Don F. Noble
- Jeff O'Brien
- J David Osborne
- Riley Michael Parker
- Christoph Paul
- William Pauley III
- Cameron Pierce
- Sam Pink
- Pedro Proença
- Andersen Prunty
- Katy Michelle Quinn
- Steven Rage
- Liv Rainey-Smith
- Gina Ranalli
- Tony Rauch
- Dustin Reade
- Matthew Revert
- Sam Richard
- Jason Rizos
- Jennifer Robin
- Tamara Romero
- Michael Allen Rose
- Kris Saknussemm
- Bradley Sands
- Tiffany Scandal
- Michael J. Seidlinger
- Kevin Shamel
- Jeremy C. Shipp
- John Shirley
- Bix Skahill
- John Skipp
- Danger Slater
- Bryan Smith
- Shane Ryan Staley
- Andrew James Stone
- Alyssa Sturgill
- Madeleine Swann
- Kevin Sweeney
- Molly Tanzer
- Bruce Taylor
- Anthony Trevino
- Violet LeVoit
- Brendan Vidito
- Daniel Vlasaty
- Grant Wamack
- J.W. Wargo
- Patrick Wensink
- Wrath James White
- Lee Widener
- Caleb Wilson
- D. Harlan Wilson
- Jason Wuchenich
- Shawn Wunjo

== See also ==
- Absurdist fiction
- Horror comedy
- Ero guro
- New weird
- List of genres
