= Irrealism (the arts) =

Irrealism is a term that has been used by various writers in the fields of philosophy, literature, and art to denote specific modes of unreality and/or the problems in concretely defining reality. While in philosophy the term specifically refers to a position put forward by the American philosopher Nelson Goodman, in literature and art it refers to a variety of writers and movements. If the term has nonetheless retained a certain consistency in its use across these fields and would-be movements, it perhaps reflects the word's position in general English usage: though the standard dictionary definition of irreal gives it the same meaning as unreal, irreal is very rarely used in comparison with unreal. Thus, it has generally been used to describe something which, while unreal, is so in a very specific or unusual fashion, usually one emphasizing not just the "not real," but some form of estrangement from our generally accepted sense of reality.

== Irrealism in literature ==
In literature, the term irrealism was first used extensively in the United States in the 1970s to describe the post-realist "new fiction" of writers such as Donald Barthelme or John Barth. More generally, it described the notion that all forms of writing could only "offer particular versions of reality rather than actual descriptions of it," and that a story need not offer a clear resolution at its end. John Gardner, in The Art of Fiction, cites in this context the work of Barthelme and its "seemingly limitless ability to manipulate [literary] techniques as modes of apprehension [which] apprehend nothing." Though Barth, in a 1974 interview, stated, "irrealism—not antirealism or unrealism, but irrealism—is all that I would confidently predict is likely to characterize the prose fiction of the 1970s," this did not prove to be the case. Instead writing in the United States quickly returned to its realist orthodoxy and the term irrealism fell into disuse.

In recent years, however, the term has been revived in an attempt to describe and categorize, in literary and philosophical terms, how it is that the work of an irrealist writer differs from the work of writers in other, non-realistic genres (e.g., the fantasy of J.R.R. Tolkien, the magical realism of Gabriel García Márquez) and what the significance of this difference is. This can be seen in Dean Swinford's essay Defining irrealism: scientific development and allegorical possibility. Approaching the issue from a structuralist and narratological point of view, he has defined irrealism as a "peculiar mode of postmodern allegory" that has resulted from modernity's fragmentation and dismantling of the well-ordered and coherent medieval system of symbol and allegory. Thus a lion, when presented in a given context in medieval literature, could only be interpreted in a single, approved way. Contemporary literary theory, however, denies the attribution of such fixed meanings. According to Swinford, this change can be attributed in part to the fact that "science and technical culture have changed perceptions of the natural world, have significantly changed the natural world itself, thereby altering the vocabulary of symbols applicable to epistemological and allegorical attempts to understand it." Thus irreal works such as Italo Calvino's Cosmicomics and Jorge Luis Borges' Ficciones can be seen as an attempt to find a new allegorical language to explain our changed perceptions of the world that have been brought about by our scientific and technical culture, especially concepts such as quantum physics or the theory of relativity. "The Irrealist work, then, operates within a given system," writes Swinford, "and attests to its plausibility, despite the fact that this system, and the world it represents, is often a mutation, an aberration."

The online journal The Cafe Irreal , on the other hand, has defined irrealism as being a type of existentialist literature in which the means are continually and absurdly rebelling against the ends that we have determined for them. An example of this would be Franz Kafka's story The Metamorphosis, in which the salesman Gregor Samsa's plans for supporting his family and rising up in rank by hard work and determination are suddenly thrown topsy-turvy by his sudden and inexplicable transformation into a man-sized insect. Such fiction is said to emphasize the fact that human consciousness, being finite in nature, can never make complete sense of, or successfully order, a universe that is infinite in its aspects and possibilities. Which is to say: as much as we might try to order our world with a certain set of norms and goals (which we consider our real world), the paradox of a finite consciousness in an infinite universe creates a zone of irreality ("that which is beyond the real") that offsets, opposes, or threatens the real world of the human subject. Irrealist writing often highlights this irreality, and our strange fascination with it, by combining the unease we feel because the real world doesn't conform to our desires with the narrative quality of the dream state (where reality is constantly and inexplicably being undermined); it is thus said to communicate directly, "by feeling rather than articulation, the uncertainties inherent in human existence or, to put it another way... the irreconcilability between human aspiration and human reality." If the irreal story can be considered an allegory, then, it would be an allegory that is "so many pointers to an unknown meaning," in which the meaning is felt more than it is articulated or systematically analyzed.

== Irrealism in art ==
Various writers have addressed the question of Irrealism in Art. Many salient observations on Irrealism in Art are found in Nelson Goodman's Languages of Art. Goodman himself produced some multimedia shows, one of which inspired by hockey and is entitled Hockey Seen: A Nightmare in Three Periods and Sudden Death.

Garret Rowlan, writing in The Cafe Irreal, writes that the malaise present in the work of the Italian artist Giorgio de Chirico, "which recalls Kafka, has to do with the sense of another world lurking, hovering like the long shadows that dominate de Chirico's paintings, which frequently depict a landscape at twilight's uncertain hour. Malaise and mystery are all by-products of the interaction of the real and the unreal, the rub and contact of two worlds caught on irrealism's shimmering surface."

The writer Dean Swinford, whose concept of irrealism was described at length in the section "Irrealism in Literature", wrote that the artist Remedios Varos, in her painting The Juggler, "creates a personal allegorical system which relies on the predetermined symbols of Christian and classical iconography. But these are quickly refigured into a personal system informed by the scientific and organized like a machine...in the Irreal work, allegory operates according to an altered, but constant and orderly iconographic system."

Artist Tristan Tondino claims "There is no specific style to Irrealist Art. It is the result of awareness that every human act is the result of the limitations of the world of the actor."

In Australia, the art journal the art life has recently detected the presence of a "New Irrealism" among the painters of that country, which is described as being an "approach to painting that is decidedly low key, deploying its effects without histrionic showmanship, while creating an eerie other world of ghostly images and abstract washes." What exactly constituted the "old" irrealism, they do not say.

== Irrealist Art, Film and Music Edition ==
Irrealist Art Edition is a publishing company created in the 90s by contemporary plastic artist Frédéric Iriarte. Together with the Estonian poet, writer and art critic Ilmar Laaban, they developed their concept of Irrealism through several essays, exhibitions, projects, manifesto and a book, "Irréalisation". Irrealist Art Edition ISBN 91-630-2304-0

== See also ==
- Franz Kafka
- Nikolai Gogol
- René Magritte
- Kōbō Abe
- Giorgio de Chirico
- Magnus Mills
- Jorge Luis Borges
- Donald Barthelme
- John Barth
- Remedios Varo
- Frédéric Iriarte
- D. Harlan Wilson
- Max Blecher
