= British Fantasy Award for Best Non-Fiction =

Annual literary award for speculative fiction

- Awarded for: Non-fiction works in the field of speculative fiction
- Country: United Kingdom
- Presented by: British Fantasy Society
- First award: 2007; 19 years ago
- Most recent winner: Nigerian Speculative Fiction: Evolution by Chukwunonso Ezeiyoke
- Website: britishfantasysociety.org

The British Fantasy Award for Best Non-Fiction is a literary award given annually as part of the British Fantasy Awards.

== Winners and shortlists ==
* Winners

Year	Author / Editor	Work	Publisher	Ref.
2007	Mark Morris*	Cinema Macabre	PS Publishing	
2007	Allen Ashley	The Days of the Dodo	Dodo Press	
2007	Paul Kane	The Hellraiser Films and Their Legacy	McFarland & Company	
2007	Andy Murray	Into the Unknown: The Fantastic Life of Nigel Kneale	Headpress	
2007	Julie Phillips	James Tiptree, Jr.: The Double Life of Alice B. Sheldon	St. Martin's Press	
2008	Peter Tennant*	Whispers of Wickedness	—	
2008	Peter Thrower	Nightmare USA: The Untold Story of the Exploitation Independents	FAB Press	
2008	Allen Ashley	"Planet Dodo"	—	
2008	Darren Turpin	UKSF Book News	—	
2008	Mark Valentine	Wormwood	Tartarus Press	
2009	Stephen Jones, ed.*	Basil Copper: A Life in Books	PS Publishing	
2009	Russell T. Davies	Doctor Who: The Writer’s Tale	BBC Books	
2009	Benjamin Cook	Doctor Who: The Writer’s Tale	BBC Books	
2009	Neil Gaiman	journal.neilgaiman.com	—	
2009	Nick Lowe	"Mutant Popcorn"	Interzone	
2009	Paul Kincaid	What Is It We Do When We Read Science Fiction	Beccon Publications	
2010	David Langford*	Ansible Link	news.ansible.co.uk	
2010	George Beahm	Knowing Darkness: Artists Inspired by Stephen King	Centipede Press	
2010	Axelle Carolyn	It Lives Again! Horror Movies in the New Millennium	Telos Publishing	
2010	John Scalzi	Whatever	scalzi.com/whatever	
2010	Peter Tennant	"Case Notes"	Black Static	
2011	Vincent Chong*	Altered Visions: The Art of Vincent Chong	Telos Publishing	
2011	Mark Morris	Cinema Futura	PS Publishing	
2011	Steven Savile	Fantastic TV: 50 Years of Cult Fantasy and Science Fiction	Plexus Publishing	
2011	Harold Billings	M.P. Shiel: The Middle Years 1897-1923	Roger Beacham	
2011	Darrel Buxton	The Shrieking Sixties	Midnight Marquee	
2012	Grant Morrison*	Supergods: Our World in the Age of the Super Hero	Jonathan Cape	
2012	Johnny Mains	Lest You Should Suffer Nightmares: A Biography of Herbert Van Thal	Screaming Dreams	
2012	Kim Newman	Nightmare Movies: Horror on Screen Since the 1960s	Bloomsbury Publishing	
2012	Jonathan Rigby	Studies in Terror: Landmarks of Horror Cinema	Signum	
2012	Peter Tennant	"Case Notes"	Black Static	
2013	Anne C. Perry, ed.*	Pornokitsch	—	
2013	Jared Shurin, ed.*	Pornokitsch	—	
2013	David Langford	Ansible	—	
2013	Edward James, ed.	The Cambridge Companion to Fantasy Literature	Cambridge University Press	
2013	Farah Mendlesohn, ed.	The Cambridge Companion to Fantasy Literature	Cambridge University Press	
2013	Stephen Volk	"Coffinmaker's Blues"	Black Static	
2013	Marc Aplin	Fantasy Faction	—	
2013	Diana Wynne Jones	Reflections: On the Magic of Writing	David Fickling	
2014	Justin Landon, ed.*	Speculative Fiction 2012	Jurassic London	
2014	Jared Shurin, ed.*	Speculative Fiction 2012	Jurassic London	
2014	Marc Aplin	Fantasy Faction	—	
2014	Mike Barrett	Doors to Elsewhere	The Alchemy Press	
2014	Kameron Hurley	"We Have Always Fought: Challenging the Women, Cattle and Slaves Narrative"	A Dribble of Ink	
2014	D. F. Lewis	Gestalt Real-Time Reviews	—	
2015	S. T. Joshi, ed.*	Letters to Arkham: The Letters of Ramsey Campbell and August Derleth, 1961-1971	PS Publishing	
2015	Hal Duncan	Rhapsody: Notes on Strange Fictions	Lethe Press	
2015	Jonathan Green	You Are the Hero: A History of Fighting Fantasy Gamebooks	Snowbooks	
2015	John Howard	Touchstones: Essays on the Fantastic	The Alchemy Press	
2015	D. F. Lewis	D. F. Lewis Dreamcatcher Real-Time Reviews	D. F. Lewis	
2015	Jim McLeod, ed.	Ginger Nuts of Horror	Jim McLeod	
2015	Adam Roberts	Sibilant Fricative: Essays & Reviews	Steel Quill	
2016	Alexandra Pierce, ed.*	Letters to Tiptree	Twelfth Planet	
2016	Alisa Krasnostein, ed.*	Letters to Tiptree	Twelfth Planet	
2016	Marc Aplin, ed.	Fantasy Faction	—	
2016	Jennie Ivins, ed.	Fantasy Faction	—	
2016	Stephen Jones, ed.	The Art of Horror: An Illustrated History	Applause Theater & Cinema	
2016	Jim McLeod, ed.	Ginger Nuts of Horror	gingernutsofhorror.com	
2016	Kari Sperring	Matrilines	Strange Horizons	
2016	Mark West, ed.	King for a Year	kingreviews2015.blogspot.com	
2017	Kameron Hurley*	The Geek Feminist Revolution	Tor Books	
2017	Gary Couzens	Blood Spectrum	Black Static	
2017	Jim McLeod, ed.	Ginger Nuts of Horror	—	
2017	Joel Lane	This Spectacular Darkness	Tartarus Press	
2017	Mark Valentine, ed.	This Spectacular Darkness	Tartarus Press	
2017	Sarah Gailey	The Women of Harry Potter	Tor.com	
2017	Ursula K. Le Guin	Words are my Matter: Writings about Life and Books, 2000-2016	Small Beer Press	
2018	FT Barbini, ed.*	Gender Identity and Sexuality in Science Fiction and Fantasy	Luna Press	
2018	Jim McLeod, ed.	Ginger Nuts of Horror	—	
2018	Alexandra Pierce, ed.	Luminescent Threads Mimi Mondal	Twelfth Planet	
2018	Mimi Mondal, ed.	Luminescent Threads Mimi Mondal	Twelfth Planet	
2018	Ursula K. Le Guin	No Time to Spare: Thinking About What Matters	Houghton Mifflin Harcourt	
2018	Grady Hendrix	Paperbacks from Hell: The Twisted History of 70s and 80s Horror Fiction	Quirk Books	
2018	Maura McHugh	Twin Peaks: Fire Walk with Me	Electric Dreamhouse Press	
2019	Ruth EJ Booth*	Noise and Sparks	Shoreline of Infinity	
2019	Francesca T. Barbini, ed.	The Evolution of African Fantasy and Science Fiction	Luna Press	
2019	Alasdair Stuart	The Full Lid	—	
2019	Jim McLeod, ed.	Ginger Nuts of Horror	—	
2019	Tim Major	Les Vampires	PS Publishing	
2020	Ebony Elizabeth Thomas*	The Dark Fantastic: Race and the Imagination from Harry Potter to the Hunger Games	New York University Press	
2020	Stephen Volk	Coffinmaker's Blues: Collected Writings on Terror	PS Publishing	
2020	Alasdair Stuart	The Full Lid	—	
2020	Gwyneth Jones	Joanna Russ (Modern Masters of SF)	University of Illinois Press	
2020	Lynda E. Rucker	Notes from the Borderland	Black Static, TTA Press	
2020	Farah Mendlesohn	The Pleasant Profession of Robert E Heinlein	Unbound	
2021	Alison Peirse, ed.*	Women Make Horror: Filmmaking, Feminism, Genre	Rutgers University Press	
2021	Francesca T. Barbini, ed.	Ties that Bind: Love in Fantasy and Science Fiction	Luna Press	
2021	Paul Kincaid	The Unstable Realities of Christopher Priest	Gylphi Limited	
2021	Adam Roberts	It's the End of the World: But What Are We Really Afraid Of?	Elliot & Thompson	
2021	Lynda E. Rucker	Notes from the Borderland	Black Static	
2021	Alasdair Stuart	The Full Lid	—	
2021	Marguerite Kenner	The Full Lid	—	
2022	Dan Coxon, ed.*	Writing the Uncanny	Dead Ink	
2022	Richard V. Hirst, ed.*	Writing the Uncanny	Dead Ink	
2022	Thomas Connolly	After Human: A Critical History of the Human in Science Fiction from Shelley to Le Guin	Liverpool University Press	
2022	Francesca T. Barbini, ed.	Worlds Apart: Worldbuilding in Fantasy and Science Fiction	Luna Press	
2022	Alasdair Stuart	The Full Lid	—	
2022	Marguerite Kenner	The Full Lid	—	
2022	Andrew Nette, ed.	Dangerous Visions and New Worlds: Radical Science Fiction, 1950-1985	PM Press	
2022	Iain McIntyre, ed.	Dangerous Visions and New Worlds: Radical Science Fiction, 1950-1985	PM Press	
2022	Jim McLeod, ed.	Ginger Nuts of Horror	—	
2023	Eugen Bacon*	An Earnest Blackness	Anti-Oedipus	
2023	Brian Attebery	Fantasy: How it Works	Oxford University Press	
2023	Shona Kinsella	Outlander and the Real Jacobites	Pen & Sword History	
2023	Kit Power	My Life in Horror, Vol. 2	Self-published	
2023	Alasdair Stuart	The Full Lid	—	
2023	Marguerite Kenner	The Full Lid	—	
2023	Rob Wilkins	Terry Pratchett: A Life with Footnotes	Doubleday	
2024	Dan Coxon, ed.*	Writing the Future	Dead Ink	
2024	Richard V. Hirst, ed.*	Writing the Future	Dead Ink	
2024	Tiffani Angus	Spec Fic for Newbies: A Beginner’s Guide to Writing Subgenres of Science Fiction, Fantasy, and Horror	Luna Press	
2024	Val Nolan	Spec Fic for Newbies: A Beginner’s Guide to Writing Subgenres of Science Fiction, Fantasy, and Horror	Luna Press	
2024	Delyth Badder	The Folklore of Wales: Ghosts	Calon	
2024	Mark Norman	The Folklore of Wales: Ghosts	Calon	
2024	Alasdair Stuart	The Full Lid	—	
2024	Marguerite Kenner	The Full Lid	—	
2025	Sacha Coward*	Queer as Folklore: The Hidden Queer History of Myths and Monsters	Unbound	
2025	Tiffani Angus	Spec Fic for Newbies Vol 2: A Beginner's Guide to Writing More Subgenres of Science Fiction, Fantasy, and Horror	Luna Press	
2025	Val Nolan	Spec Fic for Newbies Vol 2: A Beginner's Guide to Writing More Subgenres of Science Fiction, Fantasy, and Horror	Luna Press	
2025	David Green	"Autism and Writing"	BFS Blog	
2025	Alasdair Stuart	The Full Lid	—	
2025	Marguerite Kenner	The Full Lid	—	
2025	Abigail Nussbaum	Track Changes	Briardene Books	
2025	Juwen Zhang	Translating, Interpreting, and Decolonizing Chinese Fairy Tales: A Case Study and Ideological Approach (Studies in Folklore and Ethnology: Traditions, Practices, and Identities)	Lexington Books	
2026	Chukwunonso Ezeiyoke*	Nigerian Speculative Fiction: Evolution	Routledge India	
2026	Dan Coxon, ed.	Writing The Magic: Essays on Crafting Fantasy Fiction	Dead Ink	
2026	Richard V. Hirst, ed.	Writing The Magic: Essays on Crafting Fantasy Fiction	Dead Ink	
2026	Eugen Bacon	"Spec Fic and the Politics of Identity: Finding the Self in Other"	Strange Horizons	
2026	Alasdair Stuart	The Full Lid	—	
2026	Marguerite Kenner	The Full Lid	—	
2026	Mark Norman	Britain's Folklore Year: A seasonal journey through our customs, celebrations and rituals	National Trust	
2026	Kevan Manwaring	The Ecological Imaginary in Literature and Other Media: The Nature of Fantasy	Routledge	
