= Ron Weighell =

British short-story writer (1950–2020)

Ronald Weighell (1950 in Leeds – 2020) was a British writer of fiction in the supernatural, fantasy and horror genre. His stories appeared in over fifty anthologies and published in six volumes containing his own work exclusively. Weighell is listed as an author in the online Bibliothèque Nationale de France, with a selected bibliography. A short biography and limited bibliography are available in the goodreads.com website. A more extensive bibliography of his published work is available in the Internet Speculative Fiction Database. Weighell died on 24 December 2020, some weeks after suffering a stroke. Obituaries have been published by the Fortean Times magazine, the newsletter of The Sherlock Holmes Society of London, and Locus Magazine.

Two of Weighell’s stories, "Carven of Onyx" and "China Rose", were chosen to appear in the 1992 and 1993 volumes, respectively, of the annual U.S. publication The Year's Best Horror Stories. Three further stories, "The Four Strengths of Shadow", "The Chapel of Infernal Devotion", and "Under the Frenzy of the Fourteenth Moon" appeared in the annual British publication Best New Horror, volumes 26 (2015), 27 (2016), and 31 (2021) respectively.

Weighell's fiction is characterized by his knowledge of incunabula, architecture, art and art symbolism, mysticism, and the occult, and pays homage to his two primary influences, M. R. James and Arthur Machen. While his protagonists are typically scholars, archaeologists, and bibliophiles, much of his fiction moves beyond traditional antiquarian ghost stories to explore both wonder and terror in the presence of supernatural forces.

Weighell's first published short story, "Bishop Asgarth's Chantry," was in 1986 in the small press Ghosts and Scholars magazine, devoted to the M. R. James tradition. From that point on, his work was published in those magazines and others, such as AKLO and All Hallows,, and in book anthologies with other writers. In 1986, Haunted Library Publications published Weighell's first short story collection, entitled An Empty House and Other Stories.

In 1992, the Northern Musgraves Sherlock Holmes Society invited Weighell to produce a story for their "Aspects of Holmes" weekend. The positive reception of "The Shadow of the Wolf", read out at the society's annual dinner, led Weighell to write more Sherlock Holmes stories. His collection The Irregular Casebook of Sherlock Holmes, published in 2000, proved a popular work and was re-printed in 2018 by Zagava Press. In 1990 an interview with Weighell was published in Sherlock Holmes The Detective Magazine, Issue 37, along with a review of The Irregular Casebook of Sherlock Holmes.

Weighell’s second collection of short stories, entitled The White Road, was published in 1997 by Ghost Story Press. The collection sold out and became a rarity, and today only an occasional copy crops up online to be purchased by collectors of his work.

During his writing career, Weighell was invited to submit articles to journals such as Warnings to the Curious: A Sheaf of Criticism on M. R. James, edited by S. T. Joshi and Rosemary Pardoe (2007).

Two further Weighell collections, Tarshishim (a box set), and Summonings, were published in 2011 and 2014 respectively. In 2017, a new edition of The White Road was published by Sarob Press, with a few stories removed and new stories added. Both editions of The White Road were illustrated by Weighell’s lifelong friend Nick Maloret. Further stories of Weighell's were published up to and including 2024.

Before he was taken ill, Weighell had been putting the finishing touches to a new novel titled King Satyr. In October 2021, small press publisher Sarob Press announced that a limited edition of the novel would be published in late November/early December 2021. The announcement was covered by the Portsmouth area UK newspaper The News in its online and paper editions, by The Isle of Wight County Press, and by the Isle of Wight online news site On the Wight.

Weighell had supplied quotes to writer Sandy Robertson for an introduction Robertson was writing for James Blish's The Day After Judgment, as part of a set of Blish's After Such Knowledge quartet of books to be reissued by Centipede Press. This was published in 2022 with a note on Weighell's passing and a mention of the posthumous publication of his novel King Satyr.

Two of Weighell's stories, "Now Feel That Pulse No More" and "The Stryx" are listed in Literary Hauntings: A Gazetteer of Literary Ghost Stories from Britain and Ireland published by Tartarus Press in 2022.

== Publications ==
- "Aquarius or Ragnarok?", article and book reviews of Haunted Britain by Antony D. Hippisley Coxe and The Dragon and the Disc by F. W. Holliday, in the WATSUP Journal, Issue 2 (1974)
- "A View from Shamballah", article and book reviews of Supernature by Lyall Watson, The Politics of Experience by R. D. Laing, and The Tree of Life by Israel Regardie, in WATSUP Journal Issue 3 (1975)
- Book reviews of Quicksilver Heritage by Paul Screeton and Cults of Unreason by Christopher Evans in WATSUP Journal Issue 4 (1975)
- "A Question of Vision", article and book review of Forbidden Universe by Leo Talamonti, in WATSUP Journal Issue 5 (1975)
- "Dark Devotions: M. R. James and the Magical Tradition", article in Ghosts & Scholars 6, edited by Rosemary Pardoe (1984)
- "Two Masters: M. R. James and the 'Times' Correspondence", article in Ghosts & Scholars 7, edited by Rosemary Pardoe (1985)
- "Bishop Asgarth’s Chantry" in Ghosts and Scholars 8, edited by Rosemary Pardoe (1986)
- An Empty House and Other Stories, collection including "An Empty House", "Diminish Like the Word", "The Box Parterre", and "The First Turning of the Second Stair", Haunted Library Publications (1986)
- Sorcery and Sanctity: The Spagyric Quest of Arthur Machen – Artist and Mystic, edited by Mark Valentine and Roger Dobson, Caermaen Books (1986)
- Angles of Coincidence: Rennes Le Château and the Magdalen Mystery, Haunted Library Publications (1987)
- "Bisschop Asgarth’s Rouwkapel" in Geesten & Geleerden, Horizon Publikatie, Belgium (1988)
- "Againbite", story; review of White Chappell, Scarlet Tracings by Iain Sinclair; and contribution to "Story Notes: 'Lost Hearts'", article with Rosemary Pardoe, David G. Rowlands, and John Alfred Taylor in Ghosts & Scholars 10, edited by Rosemary Pardoe] (1988)
- "The Fire of the Wise" in Aklo: A Journal of the Fantastic, edited by Mark Valentine and Roger Dobson (1988)
- "Arthur Machen and the Hermetic Mystery" in Avallaunius: The Journal of the Arthur Machen Society (1988)
- "The Lycurgus Cup" in Dark Dreams, edited by David Cowperthwaite and Jeffrey Dempsey (1989)
- "The Stryx" in Nocturne, Secundus, edited by Michael J. Lotus and Vincent L. Michael (1989)
- "The White Road: An Excerpt" in Aklo: A Journal of the Fantastic, edited by Mark Valentine and Roger Dobson (1989)
- "The Resurrection Brass" in Ghosts & Scholars 11, edited by Rosemary Pardoe] (1989)
- "Arthur Machen and the Abyss of Nature" in Avallaunius: The Journal of the Arthur Machen Society (1989)
- Contribution to "Story Notes: 'The Ash-Tree'", article with Rosemary Pardoe, David G. Rowlands and John Alfred Taylor in Ghosts & Scholars 11, edited by Rosemary Pardoe (1989)
- Review of Hawksmoor by Kerry Downes in Ghosts & Scholars 11, edited by Rosemary Pardoe (1989)
- "The Case of the Fiery Messengers" in Mystery for Christmas, edited by Richard Dalby, Michael O’Mara Books Limited (1990)
- "Lock Fast the Lock" in All Hallows (Journal of the Ghost Story Society), edited by Mark Valentine (1990)
- "Carven of Onyx" in Tales of Witchcraft, edited by Richard Dalby, Michael O’Mara Books Limited (1991)
- "The Boat Called Millions of Years" in All Hallows, (Journal of the Ghost Story Society) edited by Mark Valentine (1991)
- "The Circle of the Hieroglyphs" in Ghosts & Scholars 13, edited by Rosemary Pardoe (1991)
- "The Chestnut Husk" in Aklo: A Journal of the Fantastic, edited by Mark Valentine and Roger Dobson (1991)
- "Mater Dolorosa: A Fragment" in Aklo: A Journal of the Fantastic, edited by Mark Valentine and Roger Dobson (1991)
- Contribution to "Story Notes: 'The Residence At Whitminster'", article with Rosemary Pardoe, David G. Rowlands and John Alfred Taylor, in Ghosts & Scholars 13, edited by Rosemary Pardoe (1991)
- "Carven of Onyx" in The Year's Best Horror Stories XX, edited by Karl Edward Wagner, DAW Books (1992)
- "Hôn, Thôn, Fedar, Fen" in Aklo: A Journal of the Fantastic, edited by Mark Valentine and Roger Dobson, Tartarus Press (Autumn 1992)
- "China Rose" in Vampire Stories, edited by Richard Dalby, Michael O’Mara Books Limited (1992)
- "Sherlock Holmes and the Shadow of the Wolf", commissioned by The Northern Musgraves Sherlock Holmes Society, edited by Stuart Davies and Kathryn White (1992)
- "Second Death" in Dark Dreams 9, edited by David Cowperthwaite and Jeffrey Dempsey (1992)
- "Laid Down and Guarded" in Dark Dreams 9, edited by David Cowperthwaite and Jeffrey Dempsey (1992)
- "The Greater Arcana" in Horror for Christmas, edited by Richard Dalby, Michael O’Mara Books (1992). Also in paperback, Headline (1993)
- "Kiinanruusu", Finnish translation by Pertti Koskela of China Rose, in Vampyrit, edited by Richard Dalby, Book Studio (1993)
- "China Rose" in The Year's Best Horror Stories XXI, editor Karl Edward Wagner, DAW Books (1993)
- "The Greater Arcana" in Mistletoe & Mayhem: Horrific Tales for the Holidays, edited by Richard Dalby, Castle Books (1993)
- The Greater Arcana, Haunted Library Publications (1994)
- "The Ghosting from Channel 19" in All Hallows 9 (Journal of the Ghost Story Society), edited by Barbara Roden and Christopher Roden (1995)
- The White Road, collection comprising "The Lycurgus Cup", "Carven of Onyx", "China Rose", "The Ghosting from Channel 19", "The Secret Place", "Some Day I'll Find You", "Second Death", "The Shadow of the Wolf", "The Tunnel of Saksaksalim", "Mater Dolorosa: A Fragment", "Lock Fast the Lock", "The Boat Called Millions of Years", "The Greater Arcana", "In the Shaft", "Laid Down and Guarded", "Which Way I Fly", "The Stryx", "Necropolis", "Byerly Mount", "The Circle of the Hieroglyphs", "An Empty House", "Diminish Like the Word", "Bishop Asgarth's Chantry", "The Box Parterre", "Againbite", "The Resurrection Brass", "The First Turning of the Second Stair", "The Ram Head Ring", "The Case of the Fiery Messengers", "Hôn, Thôn, Fedar, Fen", "The Fire of the Wise", "The Chestnut Husk", and "The White Road," Ghost Story Press (1997)
- "The Mouth of the Medusa" in Midnight Never Comes, edited by Barbara Roden and Christopher Roden, Ash-Tree Press (1997)
- "Into the Mysteries" in Aklo: A Journal of the Fantastic, Tartarus Press (1998)
- "The Counsels of Night" in Shadows and Silence, edited by Barbara Roden and Christopher Roden, Ash-Tree Press, (2000)
- The Irregular Casebook of Sherlock Holmes, collection comprising "The Case of the Fiery Messengers", "The Shadow of the Wolf", "The Curse of Nectanebo", "The Sect of the Salamander", and "The Black Heaven", Calabash Press (2000)
- "Ron Weighell Author of The Irregular Casebook of Sherlock Holmes", Interview, published in Sherlock Holmes The Detective Magazine, Issue 37, (2000)
- "Perfume of the Trellised Vine" in Faunus 7 (Journal of the Friends of Arthur Machen), edited by Mark Valentine and R. B. Russell (2001)
- "Dark Devotions: M. R. James and the Magical Tradition", reprinted in Warnings to the Curious: A Sheaf of Criticism on M. R. James, edited by S.T. Joshi and Rosemary Pardoe, Hippocampus Press (2007)
- "The Shadow of the Wolf" in The Werewolf Pack, edited by Mark Valentine, Wordsworth Editions (2008)
- "The World Entire" in Cinnabar's Gnosis – A Homage to Gustav Meyrink, Ex Occidente Press, Romania (2009)
- "Suburbs of the Black Lyre" in The Master in Café Morphine: An Homage to Mikhail Bulgakov, edited by D. A. Ghetu, Ex Occidente Press, Romania (2011)
- Tarshishim, box set containing The Tears of the Gods (illustrated by Santiago Caruso) and Summoning of Ancient Dust, Collected Literary Fragments, Passport Levant imprint of Ex Occidente Press, Romania (2011)
- "An Image of Truth" in Sorcery and Sanctity: A Homage to Arthur Machen published by The Friends of Arthur Machen, Hieroglyphic Press (2013)
- "The Four Strengths of Shadow", Sutton Hoo Press (2013)
- Summonings, collection including "D'Arca", 'The World Entire", "The Counsels of Night", "Suburbs of the Black Lyre", "Now Feel That Pulse No More", "The Mouth of the Medusa", "An Image of Truth", "The Four Strengths of Shadow", "The Tears of the Gods", and "Into the Mysteries (An Excerpt)", Sarob Press (2014)
- "The Chapel of Infernal Devotion" and "Gramarye" in Romances of the White Day, Sarob Press (2015)
- "La Capilla del 'Obispo' Asgarth", translation into Spanish of "Bishop Asgarth's Chantry", in Sombra del Arbol de la Noche, edited by Adriana Diaz Enciso, Elefanta del Sur, Mexico (2015)
- "The Four Strengths of Shadow" in Best New Horror 26, edited by Stephen Jones, PS Publishing (2015)
- "The Chapel of Infernal Devotion" in Best New Horror 27, edited by Stephen Jones, PS Publishing (2016)
- "Drebbel, Zander and Zervan" in A Midwinter Entertainment, edited by Mark Beech, Egaeus Press (2016)
- "The Letter Killeth" in Pagan Triptych, Sarob Press (2016)
- Contribution to Booklore: A Passion for Books by Carl Abrahamsson, Avalon Brantley, B. Catling, et al., edited by Alcebiades Diniz, Zagava (2016)
- "The Asmodeus Fellowship" in From Ancient Ravens, Sarob Press (2017)
- The White Road, collection including "The Secret Place", "Againbite", "The Boat Called Millions of Years", "Carven of Onyx", "Laid Down and Guarded", "The First Turning of the Second Stair", "Bishop Asgarth’s Chantry", "China Rose", "The Tunnel of Saksaksalim", "Lock Fast the Lock", "The Greater Arcana", "An Empty House", "The Stryx", "The Box Parterre", "Byerly Mount", "Second Death", "The Chestnut Husk", "The Lycurgus Cup", "The Circle of the Hieroglyphs", "The Ram Head Ring", "Necropolis", "The Fire of the Wise", "Diminish Like the Word", "The Resurrection Brass", "The White Road", and "Out of the Hidden Land", Sarob Press (2017)
- The Irregular Casebook of Sherlock Holmes, collection including "The Case of the Fiery Messengers", "The Shadow of the Wolf", "The Curse of Nectanebo", "The Sect of the Salamander" and "The Black Heaven", Zagava (2018)
- "The Palace of Force and Fire" in The Silent Garden: A Journal of Esoteric Fabulism, edited by the Silent Garden Collective, Undertow Publications (2018)
- "Perfume of the Trellised Vine" in The Secret Ceremonies: Critical Essays on Arthur Machen, edited by Mark Valentine and Timothy J Jarvis, Hippocampus Press (2019), and in Faunus: The Decorative Imagination of Arthur Machen, edited by James Machin, Strange Attractor Press (2019)
- "Fugues of the Blue Lilly" in The Book of Flowering, Egaeus Press (2019)
- "Under the Frenzy of the Fourteenth Moon" in The Far Tower, edited by Mark Valentine, Swan River Press (2019)
- "The Invisible Worm" in Bitter Distillations, Egaeus Press (2020)
- King Satyr (a novel), Sarob Press (2021)
- "Under the Frenzy of the Fourteenth Moon" in Best New Horror 31, edited by Stephen Jones, PS Publishing (2021)
- "Spirits of the Dead" in Ornithologiae, Egaeus Press (2022)
- "The Malleus Bone" in Grotesqueries: A Tribute to the Tales of L. A. Lewis, Zagava (2022)
- Child of the Dawn (a novel), Zagava (2023)
- Spirits of the Dead, collection including "The Malleus Bone", "Older Than Christmas", "The Palace of Force and Fire", "Spirits of the Dead", "The Invisible Worm", "The Mark of Andreas Germer", "The Tale Once Told", "Under the Frenzy of the Fourteenth Moon", "Drebbel, Zander and Zervan", "The Chapel of Infernal Devotion", and "On Murder Considered as One of the Black Arts", Sarob Press (2024)
- "The Four Strengths of Shadow" in The Onyx Book of Occult Fiction, edited by Damian Murphy, Snuggly Books (2024)

== See also ==
- List of horror fiction writers
