= Strange Tales (anthology) =

Book by Rosalie Parker

- Author: edited by Rosalie Parker
- Language: English
- Genre: Fantasy, horror
- Publisher: Tartarus Press
- Publication date: 2003
- Publication place: United States
- Media type: Print (hardback)
- Pages: vi, 289 pp
- ISBN: 1-872621-80-5
- OCLC: 66287661

Strange Tales is an anthology of fantasy stories edited by Rosalie Parker. It was published by Tartarus Press in December 2003. The anthology itself won the 2004 World Fantasy Award for Best Anthology.

== Contents ==
- Foreword (Strange Tales), by Rosalie Parker
- "Cousin X", by Quentin S. Crisp
- "Meannanaich", by Anne-Sylvie Salzman
- "Number 18", by David Rix
- "The Maker of Fine Instruments", by Brendan Connell
- "The Itchy Skin of Creepy Aplomb", by Rhys Hughes
- "The Descent of the Fire", by Mark Valentine and John Howard
- "The Self-Eater", by Adam Daly
- "Grand Hotel", by William Charlton
- "Shelter Belt", by Dale J. Nelson [as by Dale Nelson ]
- "Mr Manpferdit", by Tina Rath
- "Terminus", by Nina Allan
- "Between the Dead Men and the Blind", by L. H. Maynard and M. P. N. Sims
- "From Lydia with Love and Laughter", by John Gaskin
- "Eye of the Storm", by Don Tumasonis
- "Author Biographies (Strange Tales), by uncredited
