= John Howard (author) =

English author

John Howard is an English author, born in London in 1961. His fiction has appeared in anthologies, magazines, and the collections The Silver Voices, Written by Daylight, Cities and Thrones and Powers, and Buried Shadows. The majority of Howard's stories have central and eastern European settings; many are set in the fictional Romanian town of Steaua de Munte. The Defeat of Grief is a novella set in Steaua de Munte and the real Black Sea resort of Balcic; the novellas "The Fatal Vision" (in Cities and Thrones and Powers) and The Lustre of Time form part of an ongoing series with Steaua de Munte architect and academic Cristian Luca as protagonist. Numbered as Sand or the Stars attempts a 'secret history' of Hungary between the World Wars.

John Howard has published three collections jointly written with Mark Valentine. Secret Europe comprises 25 short stories set in a variety of real and fictional European locations. Ten of the stories are by Howard and fifteen by Valentine. The expanded edition published in 2014 added an introduction and an extra story by Mark Valentine. Inner Europe (2018) is in the same vein, and comprises six stories by Howard and seven by Valentine. Powers and Presences (2020), This World and That Other (2022), and Possessions and Pursuits (2023) are tributes to the 'theological thrillers' of Charles Williams.

Howard contributed a story to Dreams of Ourselves, an anthology published in tribute to the Portuguese writer Fernando Pessoa. Contributors and editor used Pessoa heteronyms, with the authors' names only revealed in the sealed envelope supplied with each copy of the book.

Since 2003 John Howard has occasionally collaborated on short stories with Mark Valentine. Seven have featured Valentine's long-running series character The Connoisseur, an occult detective whose real name is never revealed. All tales of The Connoisseur then extant, including the collaborations, were reprinted in The Collected Connoisseur (Tartarus Press, 2010).

John Howard has written essays for numerous magazines including Book and Magazine Collector, Supernatural Tales, Wormwood, Studies in Australian Weird Fiction, and All Hallows for the Ghost Story Society. He contributed essays to the Fritz Leiber special issue of Fantasy Commentator (No. 57/58, 2004) and to the books Black Prometheus: A Critical Study of Karl Edward Wagner (Gothic Press, 2007), Fritz Leiber: Critical Essays (McFarlane, 2008), and The Man Who Collected Psychos: Critical Essays on Robert Bloch (McFarlane, 2009), all edited by Benjamin Szumskyj. Most of these essays were included in Touchstones: Essays on the Fantastic (2014), which was a British Fantasy Award nominee the following year. In 2013 Howard took over the review column Camera Obscura in Tartarus Press' journal Wormwood, which he conducted until it ceased publication in 2022.

== Bibliography ==
Books: Story collections and novellas

- The Rite of Trebizond and Other Tales (with Mark Valentine), Bucharest: Ex Occidente Press 2008
- The Collected Connoisseur (with Mark Valentine), Leyburn: Tartarus Press 2010; 2019 (expanded edition)
- The Silver Voices, Bucharest: Ex Occidente Press 2010; Dublin: Swan River Press 2014 (new edition); paperback 2022
- The Defeat of Grief, Bucharest: Passport Levant 2010; included in Three Exiles (2026)
- Secret Europe, Bucharest: Exposition Internationale 2012; Leyburn: Tartarus Press 2014 (expanded edition); paperback 2019
- Numbered as Sand or the Stars, Bucharest: Exposition Internationale 2012
- Written by Daylight, Dublin: Swan River Press 2013; paperback 2024
- Cities and Thrones and Powers, Bucharest: Les Editions de l'Oubli 2013
- The Lustre of Time, Bucharest: L’Homme Récent 2015
- Visit of a Ghost, Bucharest: Mount Abraxas 2017; included in Three Exiles (2026)
- Buried Shadows, Shaftesbury: Egaeus Press 2017
- Inner Europe, Leyburn: Tartarus Press 2018; paperback 2020
- A Flowering Wound, Dublin: Swan River Press 2019; paperback 2024
- The Voice of the Air, Shaftesbury: Egaeus Press 2020
- The Tattered Shadows, (with Mark Valentine), Sao Paulo: Raphus Press 2020 (includes Restos de Sombra, a translation into Portuguese by Fabio Waki); new edition 2024
- Offshore, Sao Paulo: Raphus Press 2020 (includes Alem-Mar, a translation into Portuguese by Fabio Waki)
- Powers and Presences, Neuilly-le-Vendin: Sarob Press 2020
- This World and That Other, Neuilly-le-Vendin: Sarob Press 2022
- Possessions and Pursuits, Neuilly-le-Vendin: Sarob Press 2023
- Three Exiles, Duesseldorf: Zagava 2026

Books: Nonfiction

- The Emperor's Pavement: Pages from a Berlin Daybook, Bucharest: Les Editions de l'Oubli 2013
- Touchstones: Essays on the Fantastic, Cheadle: Alchemy Press 2014

Other formats

- The House of the Sun, Kildwick: Mark Valentine 2005 (chapbook)
- Leaves of Ash, Kildwick: Valentine & Valentine 2015 (miniature Coptic-stitched concertina book cased in boards and concealed in a ‘matchbox’)
- New Adelphi, Duesseldorf: Zagava 2021 (hand-sewn chapbook printed on hand-made cotton rag paper)
- W, Duesseldorf: Zagava 2023 (hand-sewn chapbook printed on hand-made cotton rag paper)
- The Emissaries, Duesseldorf: Zagava 2024 (hand-sewn chapbook printed on hand-made cotton rag paper)

Stories first published in anthologies and magazines

- ‘Where Once I Did My Love Beguile’ in Beneath the Ground edited by Joel Lane, Alchemy Press 2003
- Portrait in an Unfaded Photograph in Cinnabar's Gnosis: A Homage to Gustav Meyrink edited by D.T. Ghetu, Ex Occidente Press 2009
- A Flowering Wound in Never Again edited by Allyson Bird & Joel Lane, Grey Friar Press 2010
- Red Green Black White in The Master in Cafe Morphine: A Homage to Mikhail Bulgakov edited by D.T. Ghetu, Ex Occidente Press 2011
- Out to Sea in The Touch of the Sea edited by Steve Berman, Lethe Press 2012
- Silver on Green in This Hermetic Legislature: A Homage to Bruno Schulz edited by D.T. Ghetu & D.P. Watt, Ex Occidente Press 2012
- Fac Man in Icarus: The Magazine of Gay Speculative Fiction Issue 13 (Summer 2012)
- Winter's Traces in The First Book of Classical Horror Stories edited by D.F. Lewis, Megazanthus Press 2012
- Time and the City in The Alchemy Press Book of Ancient Wonders edited by Jan Edwards & Jenny Barber, Alchemy Press 2012
- Into an Empire in Sacrum Regnum Issue II (2013) edited by Daniel Corrick & Mark Samuels, Hieroglyphic Press 2013
- Embrace the Fall of Night in Horror Without Victims edited by D.F. Lewis, Megazanthus Press 2013
- To the Anhalt Station in Rustblind and Silverbright edited by David Rix, Eibonvale Press 2013
- The Shape and Colour of the Moon in Sorcery and Sanctity: A Homage to Arthur Machen edited by Daniel Corrick & Mark Samuels, Hieroglyphic Press 2013
- Buried Shadows in Second City Scares: A Horror Express Anthology edited by Marc Shemmans, Horror Express Publications 2013
- Ziegler Against the World in Transactions of the Flesh: A Homage to Joris-Karl Huysmans edited by D.P. Watt & Peter Holman, Zagava and Ex Occidente Press 2013
- You Promised You Would Walk in Strange Tales Volume IV edited by Rosalie Parker, Tartarus Press 2014
- The Defiant Sky in Glitterwolf Magazine Issue 6 (July 2014)
- The Unfolding Map in Infra Noir edited by D.T. Ghetu, Zagava and Ex Occidente Press 2014
- King Kane in The Lovecraft eZine #32 (August 2014)
- Touched in The Ghosts & Scholars Book of Shadows Volume 2 edited by Rosemary Pardoe, Sarob Press 2014
- Falling into Stone in Horror Uncut: Tales of Social Insecurity and Economic Unease edited by Joel Lane & Tom Johnstone, Gray Friar Press 2014
- One of the stories in Dreams of Ourselves: An Appreciation of Pessoa edited by Adolph Moscow, Zagava and Ex Occidente Press 2014
- More Than India in Strange Tales Volume V edited by Rosalie Parker, Tartarus Press 2015
- The Floor of Heaven in Romances of the White Day (Stories in the Tradition of Arthur Machen) edited by Robert Morgan (uncredited), Sarob Press 2015
- Least Light, Most Night in Aickman's Heirs edited by Simon Strantzas, Undertow Publications 2015
- A Song Out of Reach in Soliloquy for Pan edited by Mark Beech, Egaeus Press 2015; tenth anniversary edition 2025
- In the Clearing in Pagan Triptych (Stories in the Tradition of Algernon Blackwood) edited by Robert Morgan (uncredited), Sarob Press 2016
- The Shadow Suns in Carnacki: The Lost Cases edited by Sam Gafford, Ulthar Press 2016
- Then and Now in Uncertainties: Volume II edited by Brian J. Showers, Swan River Press 2016
- A Gap in Society in The Ghosts & Scholars Book of Shadows Volume 3 edited by Rosemary Pardoe, Sarob Press 2016
- Another Sea in And the Whοre Is This Temple edited by Damian Murphy & Geticus Polus, Mount Abraxas 2016
- Coming to Life in Something Remains by Joel Lane and Friends edited by Peter Coleborn & Pauline E. Dungate, Alchemy Press 2016
- Between Me and the Sun in From Ancient Ravens edited by Robert Morgan (uncredited), Sarob Press 2017
- The Golden Mile in All Is Full of Hell: A Panegyric for William Blake edited by Damian Murphy & D.T. Ghetu, Mount Abraxas 2017
- The House at Twilight in Supernatural Tales 35 (Summer 2017)
- We, the Rescued in Nightscript: Volume Three edited by C.M. Muller, Chthonic Matter 2017
- Speck in The Scarlet Soul: Stories for Dorian Gray edited by Mark Valentine, Swan River Press 2017
- Against the Dead in Supernatural Tales 38 (Summer 2018)
- The Property of the Dead in The Far Tower: Stories for W. B. Yeats edited by Mark Valentine, Swan River Press 2019
- The Primordial Light in The Alchemy Press Book of Horrors 2 edited by Peter Coleborn & Jan Edwards, Alchemy Press 2020
- The Air of Glory in The Ghosts & Scholars Book of Mazes edited by Rosemary Pardoe, Sarob Press 2020
- The Dance of Gold in Powers and Presences, Sarob Press 2020
- All the Times of the City in This World and That Other, Sarob Press 2022
- When I Heard My Days Before Me in The Ghosts & Scholars Book of Follies and Grottoes edited by Rosemary Pardoe, Sarob Press 2022
- At the Height in Grotesqueries: A Tribute to the Tales of L.A. Lewis edited by Mark Valentine, Zagava 2022
- Overgrowth in Unquiet Grove edited by Mark Beech, Egaeus Press 2023
- Fallen Sun in Possessions and Pursuits, Sarob Press 2023
- The White Round in The Ghosts & Scholars Book of Landscape Figures edited by Rosemary Pardoe, Sarob Press 2024
- Desire Path in Votive Offerings edited by Robert Morgan, Sarob Press 2026

Essays (uncollected)

- Fritz Leiber in Book and Magazine Collector No. 307, May 2009
- Osbert Lancaster in Book and Magazine Collector No. 315, Christmas 2009
- The Baroque of the Void: A Fantastic Fiction of the Austrian Idea in Wormwood No. 20, Spring 2013 (on The Man without Qualities by Robert Musil)
- The Way to the City: The Final Novels of Charles Williams in Wormwood No. 23, Autumn 2014
- Lords of All Power: The Apocalyptic Science Fiction Novels of Robert Hugh Benson in Wormwood No. 26, Spring 2016 and No. 27, Autumn 2016
- Mapping the Territory: Joel Lane’s Essays in This Spectacular Darkness: Critical Essays by Joel Lane, edited by Mark Valentine & John Howard, Tartarus Press 2016
- Impossible Histories: Arthur Machen's A Fragment of Life in Faunus No. 35, Spring 2017
- From Canterbury to the Stars: The Dark Imagination of Philip E. High in Wormwood No. 29, Autumn 2017
- Looking Backward from Tomorrow: Mack Reynolds and His Pulp Fiction Utopias in Wormwood No. 31, Autumn 2018
- The Long Count-Down: The Novels of Charles Eric Maine in Wormwood No. 32, Spring 2019
- Interpenetrations: Ecstasy and Boundaries in the Works of Arthur Machen in Faunus: The Decorative Imagination of Arthur Machen edited by James Machin, Strange Attractor Press 2019
- The Impossible History: Machen's "A Fragment of Life" in The Secret Ceremonies: Critical Essays on Arthur Machen edited by Mark Valentine and Timothy J. Jarvis, Hippocampus Press 2019
- Lost Earths and Stolen Suns: Emil Petaja's Novels of the 'Land of Heroes' in Wormwood No. 33, Autumn 2019
- Still They Wished for Company: Two Novels Linked Through Time? in Wormwood No. 34, Spring 2020 (on novels by Margaret Irwin and Marghanita Laski)
- Forrest Reid in The Green Book No. 16, Samhain 2020
- An Undiscovered Nerve: The Alarming Visa for Avalon in Wormwood No. 35, Autumn 2020 (on the novel by Bryher)
- Escaping from the Button Molder: The Fiction of Fritz Leiber in Wormwood No. 37, Autumn 2021
- Boundaries of Friendship: Two Nephews and Their Uncles in Wormwood No. 38, Spring 2022 (on novels by Forrest Reid and Jocelyn Brooke)
- Bellfield in Undefined Boundary: The Journal of Psychick Albion Volume 2 Issue 2, 2024
- Meeting Sir Francis in Undefined Boundary: The Journal of Psychick Albion Volume 3 Issue 2, 2025
- Life in the Woods: Malcolm Lowry's "The Forest Path to the Spring" in The Magus of Mexico: Malcolm Lowry, Magic and Myth edited by Mark Valentine, Zagava 2025
- The Things We've Lost: Fritz Leiber's "When the Change-Winds Blow" in Ghosts & Scholars 50, 2026

Introductions and afterwords

- Cold Harbour (1924) by Francis Brett Young (Ash-Tree Press, 2007)
- The Killer and the Slain (1942) by Hugh Walpole (Valancourt Books, 2014)
- October the First Is Too Late (1966) by Fred Hoyle (Valancourt Books, 2015)
- All Souls' Night (1933) by Hugh Walpole (Valancourt Books, 2016)
- The Pale Brown Thing (1977) by Fritz Leiber (Swan River Press, 2016)
- The Travelling Grave and Other Stories (1948) by L.P. Hartley (Valancourt Books, 2017)
- Splendid in Ash by Charles Wilkinson (Egaeus Press, 2018)
- Intimations of Death (1910) by Felix Timmermans (Valancourt Books, 2019)

Stories in collaboration with Mark Valentine

- The White Solander in Masques and Citadels by Mark Valentine, Tartarus Press 2003; included in The Collected Connoisseur
- The Last Archipelago in Masques and Citadels by Mark Valentine, Tartarus Press 2003; included in The Collected Connoisseur
- The Descent of the Fire in Strange Tales edited by Rosalie Parker, Tartarus Press 2003; included in The Collected Connoisseur
- Jerusalem Keep in Sherlock Holmes: The Game’s Afoot edited by David Stuart Davies, Wordsworth Editions 2008
- The Rite of Trebizond in The Rite of Trebizond and Other Tales, Ex Occidente Press 2008; included in The Collected Connoisseur
- Out of the Obelisk in The Rite of Trebizond and Other Tales, Ex Occidente Press 2008
- The Temple of Time in The Rite of Trebizond and Other Tales, Ex Occidente Press 2008; included in The Collected Connoisseur
- The Serpent, Unfallen in The Rite of Trebizond and Other Tales, Ex Occidente Press 2008; included in The Collected Connoisseur
- The Celestial Tobacconist in A Midwinter Entertainment edited by Mark Beech, Egaeus Press 2016; included in The Collected Connoisseur (2019 edition only)
- On the Art in The Conspirators (A Borgean Tribute to Jorge Luis Borges) edited by Alcebiades Diniz Miguel, Raphus Press 2019

Edited

- This Spectacular Darkness: Critical Essays by Joel Lane edited by Mark Valentine & John Howard, Leyburn: Tartarus Press 2016
