= Swan River Press =

Irish publishing company

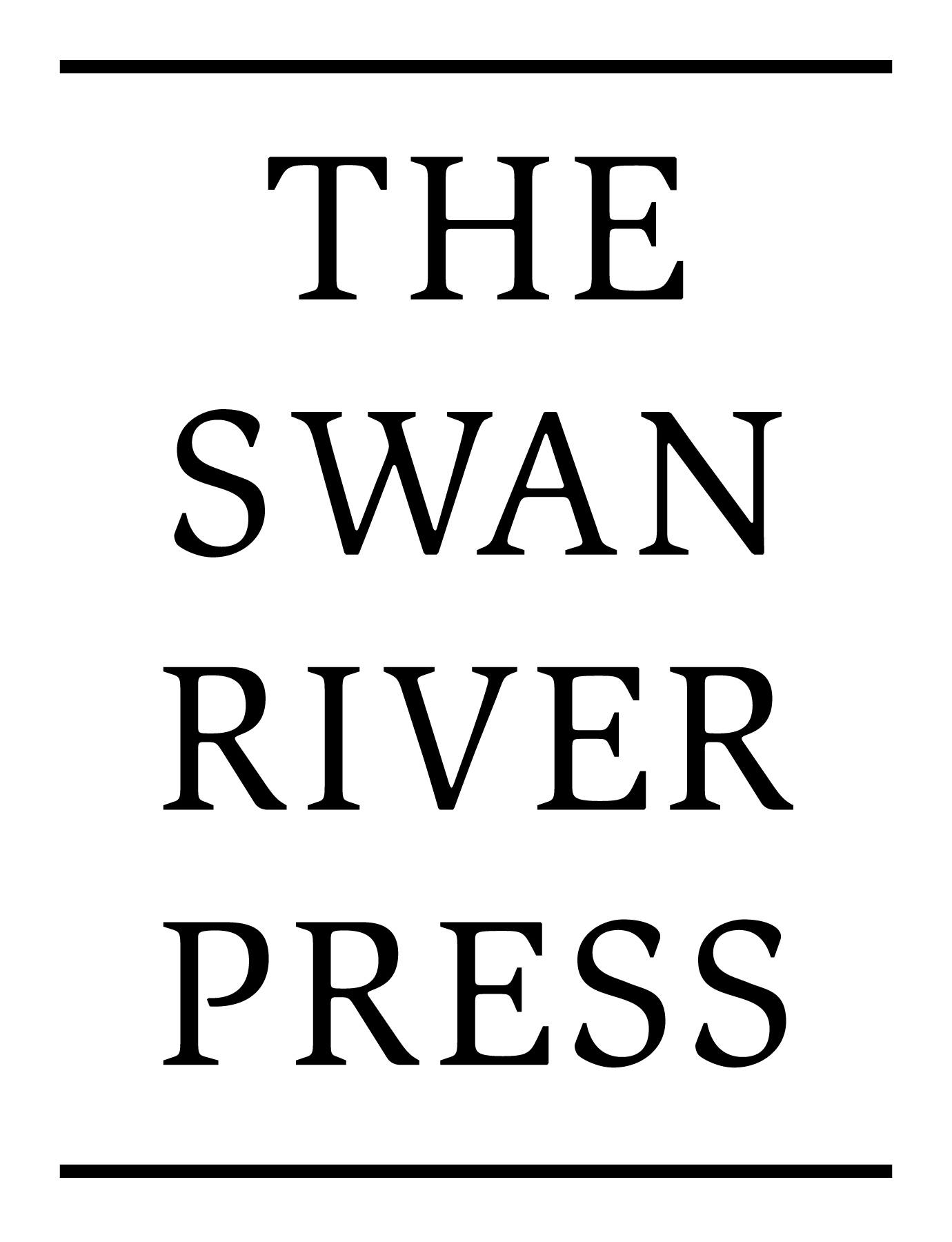
- Status: Active
- Founded: 2003
- Founder: Brian J. Showers
- Country of origin: Ireland
- Headquarters location: Dublin
- Publication types: Books, Journals
- Fiction genres: Gothic, supernatural, and fantastic literature
- Official website: swanriverpress.ie

Swan River Press is an independent Irish publishing company dedicated to gothic, supernatural, and fantastic literature. It was founded in Rathmines, Dublin in October 2003 by Brian J. Showers. Swan River publishes contemporary fiction from around the world with an emphasis on Ireland's past and present contributions to the genre. They also issue the non-fiction journal The Green Book: Writings on Irish Gothic, Supernatural and Fantastic Literature, and sporadically organise the Dublin Ghost Story Festival.

The company name comes from the subterranean waterway which flows through the neighbourhood of Rathmines in Dublin and the logo was created by Duane Spurlock from the image of the keystone on the entrance of the Rathmines Town Hall.

== History ==
Swan River Press was founded in 2003, originally to print hand-sewn chapbooks and booklets for private distribution. In 2010 Swan River published their first hardback title, The Old Knowledge & Other Strange Stories by Rosalie Parker. The Green Book: Writings on Irish Gothic, Supernatural and Fantastic Literature commenced publication in spring of 2013.

== Publishing ==
Swan River specializes in publishing high quality editions with dust jackets, printed boards, sewn binding, and head and tail bands on its hardbound books, with all booklets being hand-sewn. The press is financed by the sales of the books and by patrons who can sign up at various levels of support. Swan River Press has worked with artists such as Lorena Carrington, Brian Coldrick, John Coulthart, Dave McKean, Mike Mignola, Alisdair Wood, and Jason Zerrillo to create distinctive covers and designs. The publisher features contemporary authors such as Mark Valentine, Brian Catling, and Helen Grant in the Uncertainties anthology series as well as classic works by writers including Bram Stoker, J. S. Le Fanu, B. M. Croker, Thomas Leland, and George William Russell (A.E.). The two sides are united by the press in William Hope Hodgson’s The House on the Borderland, which features an introduction by Alan Moore and an afterword by Iain Sinclair.

=== Uncertainties ===
Uncertainties is a series of anthologies considered to be the flagship publications of the company. Stories from this series have been given honourable mention in or selected for Ellen Datlow’s Best Horror of the Year and Stephen Jones’s Best New Horror reprint anthologies. The volumes are "the very latest in weird storytelling" according to Michael Dirda in the Washington Post; with the series lauded by Joyce Carol Oates in the Times Literary Supplement as "Among the most memorable books I’ve read this year".

=== The Green Book ===
Since 2013, the press has published a twice-yearly journal The Green Book: Writings on Irish Gothic, Supernatural and Fantastic Literature. Ellen Datlow called The Green Book, "A welcome addition to the realm of accessible nonfiction about supernatural horror." The publication includes articles and commentaries on Irish genre writers and their work, as well as reprints of classic writing, interviews, and occasional fiction, including previously uncollected work by both Bram Stoker and Dorothy Macardle. Past themed issues have given focus to J. S. Le Fanu on the bicentenary of his birth, the 1916 Easter Rising, writing by Irish women, and Lord Dunsany.

=== Awards ===
Dreams of Shadow and Smoke: Stories for J. S. Le Fanu, edited by Jim Rockhill and Brian J. Showers, won the Ghost Story Award for best anthology in 2014.

== Selected bibliography ==
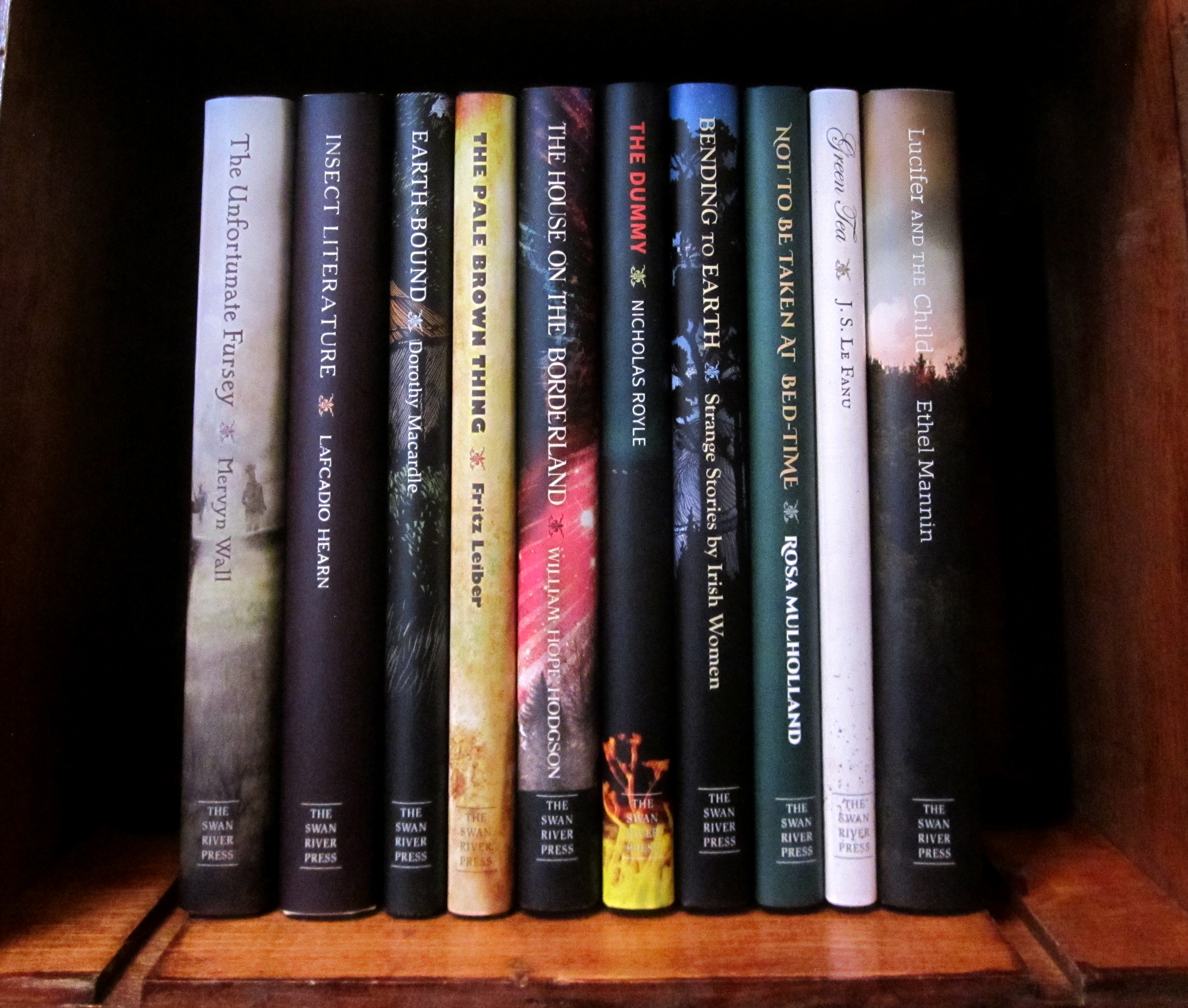
Assorted titles

Novels

- Munky (2020) by B. Catling
- Green Tea (2019) by Joseph Sheridan Le Fanu
- The House on the Borderland (2018) by William Hope Hodgson
- The Pale Brown Thing (2016) by Fritz Leiber
- Longsword (2012) by Thomas Leland
- Lucifer and the Child (2020) by Ethel Mannin
- The Dark Return of Time (2014) by R. B. Russell
- The Unfortunate Fursey (2015) by Mervyn Wall
- The Return of Fursey (2015) by Mervyn Wall
- Leaves for the Burning (2020) by Mervyn Wall

Collections

- Strange Epiphanies (2012) by Peter Bell
- Curfew & Other Eerie Tales (2011) by Lucy M. Boston
- A Mystery of Remnant (2025) by B. Catling
- The Fatal Move and Other Stories (2021) by Conall Cearnach
- The Satyr & Other Tales (2015) by Stephen J. Clark
- "Number Ninety" & Other Ghost Stories (2019) by B. M. Croker
- Nocturnal Mirrors (2026) by Richard Gavin
- The Sea Change & Other Stories (2013) by Helen Grant
- Atmospheric Disturbances (2024) by Helen Grant
- A Vanished Hand and Others (2021) by Clotilde Graves
- Strange South Seas (2026) by Beatrice Grimshaw
- Insect Literature (2015) by Lafcadio Hearn
- Written by Daylight (2013) by John Howard
- The Silver Voices (2014) by John Howard
- A Flowering Wound (2019) by John Howard
- Treatises on Dust (2023) by Timothy J. Jarvis
- The Anniversary of Never (2015) by Joel Lane
- Reminiscences of a Bachelor (2014) by Joseph Sheridan Le Fanu
- Eyes of Terror and Other Dark Adventures (2021) by L.T. Meade
- November Night Tales (2015) by Henry C. Mercer
- Earth-Bound and Other Supernatural Tales (2016) by Dorothy Macardle
- Not to Be Taken at Bed-Time and Other Strange Stories (2019) by Rosa Mulholland
- An Arabian Night-mare and Others (1848-1854) (2025) by Fitz James O'Brien
- The Diamond Lens and Others (1855-1858) (2025) by Fitz James O'Brien
- What Was It? and Others (1858-1864) (2025) by Fitz James O'Brien
- The Ruins of Contracoeur and Other Presences (2021) by Joyce Carol Oates
- The Old Knowledge & Other Strange Stories (2010) by Rosalie Parker
- Sparks from the Fire (2018) by Rosalie Parker
- The Dummy & Other Uncanny Stories (2018) by Nicholas Royle
- You'll Know When You Get There (2016) by Lynda E. Rucker
- Now It's Dark (2023) by Lynda E. Rucker
- Ghosts (2012) by R. B. Russell
- Death Makes Strangers of Us All (2018) by R. B. Russell
- Selected Poems (2017) by George William Russell (A.E.)
- Old Albert: An Epilogue (2012) by Brian J. Showers
- The Bleeding Horse and Other Ghost Stories (2026) by Brian J. Showers
- Agents of Oblivion (2023) by Iain Sinclair
- Old Hoggen and Other Adventures (2017) by Bram Stoker
- Here with the Shadows (2014) by Steve Rasnic Tem
- The Death Spancel and Others (2020) by Katharine Tynan
- Selected Stories (2012) by Mark Valentine
- Seventeen Stories (2013) by Mark Valentine
- Lost Estates (2024) by Mark Valentine
- A Flutter of Wings (2017) by Mervyn Wall

Anthologies

- Bending to Earth: Strange Stories by Irish Women (2019) edited by Maria Giakaniki and Brian J. Showers
- Dreams of Shadow & Smoke: Stories for J. S. Le Fanu (2014) edited by Jim Rockhill and Brian J. Showers
- The Far Tower: Stories for W. B. Yeats (2019) edited by Mark Valentine
- Ghosts of the Chit-Chat (2020) edited by Robert Lloyd Parry
- Friends and Spectres (2024) edited by Robert Lloyd Parry
- Ghosts on the Cam (2026) edited by Robert Lloyd Parry
- The Scarlet Soul: Stories for Dorian Gray (2017) edited by Mark Valentine
- Uncertainties I (2016) edited by Brian J. Showers
- Uncertainties II (2016) edited by Brian J. Showers
- Uncertainties III (2018) edited by Lynda E. Rucker
- Uncertainties IV (2020) edited by Timothy J. Jarvis
- Uncertainties V (2021) edited by Brian J. Showers
- Uncertainties VI (2023) edited by Brian J. Showers
- Uncertainties VII (2024) edited by Carly Holmes
- Uncertainties VIII (2026) edited by Naben Ruthnum

Non-fiction

- The Lure of the Unknown: Essays on the Strange (2022) by Algernon Blackwood
- A Mind Turned in Upon Itself: Writings on J. S. Le Fanu (2025) by Jim Rockhill

== Dublin Ghost Story Festival ==
Swan River Press organised two Dublin Ghost Story Festivals. The first on 19 - 21 August 2016, co-organised with Irish author John Connolly; the second on 29 June - 1 July 2018. The venue for both festivals was the Grand Lodge of Ireland on Molesworth Street.

The guest of honour in 2016 was Adam L. G. Nevill, while other guests included Sarah Pinborough, Angela Slatter, and David Mitchell. In addition to readings and panel discussions, the festival featured a performance of M.R. James's "Casting the Runes" by Robert Lloyd Parry of Nunkie Theatre Company.

In 2018 the guest of honour was Pulitzer-prize winning author Joyce Carol Oates. Other guests included Lisa Tuttle, Nicholas Royle, and Andrew Michael Hurley. The festival opened with a talk, "The Lure of the Ghost Story", by Reggie Oliver, as well as a reading of his story "Quieta non Movere".

The Dublin Ghost Story Festival logo was designed by Alisdair Wood.

== Authors ==
Authors published by Swan River Press have included:

- Algernon Blackwood (1869-1951)
- Lucy M. Boston (1892-1990)
- Ramsey Campbell (b. 1946)
- Brian Catling (1948-1922)
- Conall Cearnach (1876-1929)
- John Connolly (b. 1968)
- B. M. Croker (1848-1920)
- John Darnielle (b. 1967)
- Michael Dirda (b. 1948)
- Brian Evenson (b. 1966)
- Helen Grant (b. 1964)
- Clotilde Graves (1863-1932)
- Beatrice Grimshaw (1870-1953)
- Anna Maria Hall (1800-1881)
- Lafcadio Hearn (1850-1904)
- Matthew Holness (b. 1975)
- William Hope Hodgson (1877-1918)
- John Howard (b. 1961)
- Caitriona Lally
- Joel Lane (1963-2013)
- John Langan (b. 1969)
- Joseph Sheridan Le Fanu (1814-1873)
- Fritz Leiber (1910-1992)
- Thomas Leland (1722-1785)
- Dorothy Macardle (1889-1958)
- Ethel Mannin (1900-1984)
- L. T. Meade (1844-1914)
- Henry Chapman Mercer (1856-1930)
- Alan Moore (b. 1953)
- Rosa Mulholland (1841-1921)
- Adam L. G. Nevill (b. 1969)
- Fitz James O'Brien (1826?-1862)
- Joyce Carol Oates (b. 1938)
- Reggie Oliver (b. 1952)
- Rosalie Parker
- John Reppion (b. 1978)
- Charlotte Riddell (1832-1906)
- Nicholas Royle (b. 1963)
- Lynda E. Rucker
- George William Russell (1867-1935)
- R. B. Russell
- Robert Shearman (b. 1970)
- Iain Sinclair (b. 1943)
- Angela Slatter (b. 1967)
- Bram Stoker (1847-1912)
- Simon Strantzas (b. 1972)
- Steve Rasnic Tem (b. 1950)
- Lisa Tuttle (b. 1952)
- Katharine Tynan (1859-1931)
- Mark Valentine
- Mervyn Wall (1908-1997)

== See also ==
- Supernatural Fiction
- Irish Literature
- Small Press
- Book Collecting
