= Roger Dobson =

British writer

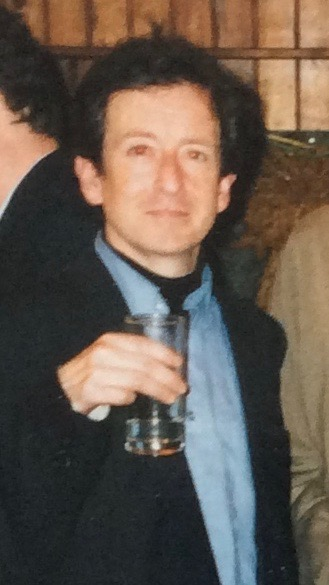
Roger Dobson at the launch party for "Fear & Loathing in Fitzrovia", Paul Willetts's biography of Julian Maclaren-Ross (London, February 2003).

Roger Alan Dobson (1954–2013) was a British author, journalist, editor and literary researcher.

Dobson wrote the Arthur Machen entry in the Dictionary of National Biography. He also edited John Gawsworth's biography of Machen and co-edited Machen's Selected Letters (with Godfrey Brangham and R. A. Gilbert, 1988). He was a regular contributor to Antiquarian Book Monthly Review, Faunus (the journal of the Friends of Arthur Machen), All Hallows (the journal of the Ghost Story Society), Wormwood and The Doppelganger Broadsheet.

== Works ==
=== Books written by Dobson ===
- Ann Lee: The Manchester Messiah, St John Press, 1987
- Hail, O King! The Last Days of John Gawsworth, Tartarus Press/Friends of Arthur Machen, 2005
- The Library of the Lost, Tartarus Press, 2015 (edited and with an Introduction by Mark Valentine, with a foreword, 'A Remarkable Man' by Javier Marías)

=== Books edited by Dobson ===
- Arthur Machen: Apostle of Wonder, Caermaen Books, 1985 (edited with Mark Valentine)
- Arthur Machen, Artist & Mystic, Caermaen Books, 1986 (edited with Mark Valentine)
- Taverns and Temples: A Guide to Some London Haunts of Arthur Machen, Caermaen Books, 1986 (edited with Mark Valentine)
- Dreams and Visions by Arthur Machen & Morchard Bishop, Caermaen Books, August 1987 (edited with Mark Valentine, though both uncredited)
- Machenstruck: Tributes to the Apostle of Wonder, Caermaen Books, 1988 (edited with Mark Valentine, though both uncredited)
- Selected Letters of Arthur Machen: The Private Writings of the Master of the Macabre, The Aquarian Press, 1988 (edited with Godfrey Brangham and R. A. Gilbert)
- The Life of Arthur Machen by John Gawsworth, The Friends of Arthur Machen, Reino de Redonda, Tartarus Press, 2005

=== Journals edited by Dobson ===
- Aklo: A Journal of the Fantastic, various issues 1988–1998 (edited with Mark Valentine)
- Redondan Cultural Foundation Newsletter (edited with Mark Valentine)
- The Lost Club Journal, various issues 1999–2004

=== Radio scripts by Dobson ===
- Redonda: The Island With Too Many Kings, BBC Radio 4 programme narrated by Angus Deayton, broadcast 22 May 2007. Interviewees include Javier Marías (King Xavier), Jon Wynne-Tyson (ex-King Juan II) and his wife Jennifer, Fay Weldon, Brian Stableford, Bob Williamson (King Robert the Bald), William L. Gates (King Leo), Oliver Cox, Cedric Boston (King Cedric), A. S. Byatt and Arthur Freeman.
- Eagle: The Space Age Weekly, presented by Sir Tim Rice, broadcast 23 December 2010.
- Classics Illustrated: The Comic Book Unbound, presented by Bill Paterson, broadcast 25 October 2011.
- Scream Queens, presented by Reece Shearsmith, broadcast 15 October 2012.
