= Helen Grant (author) =

English author

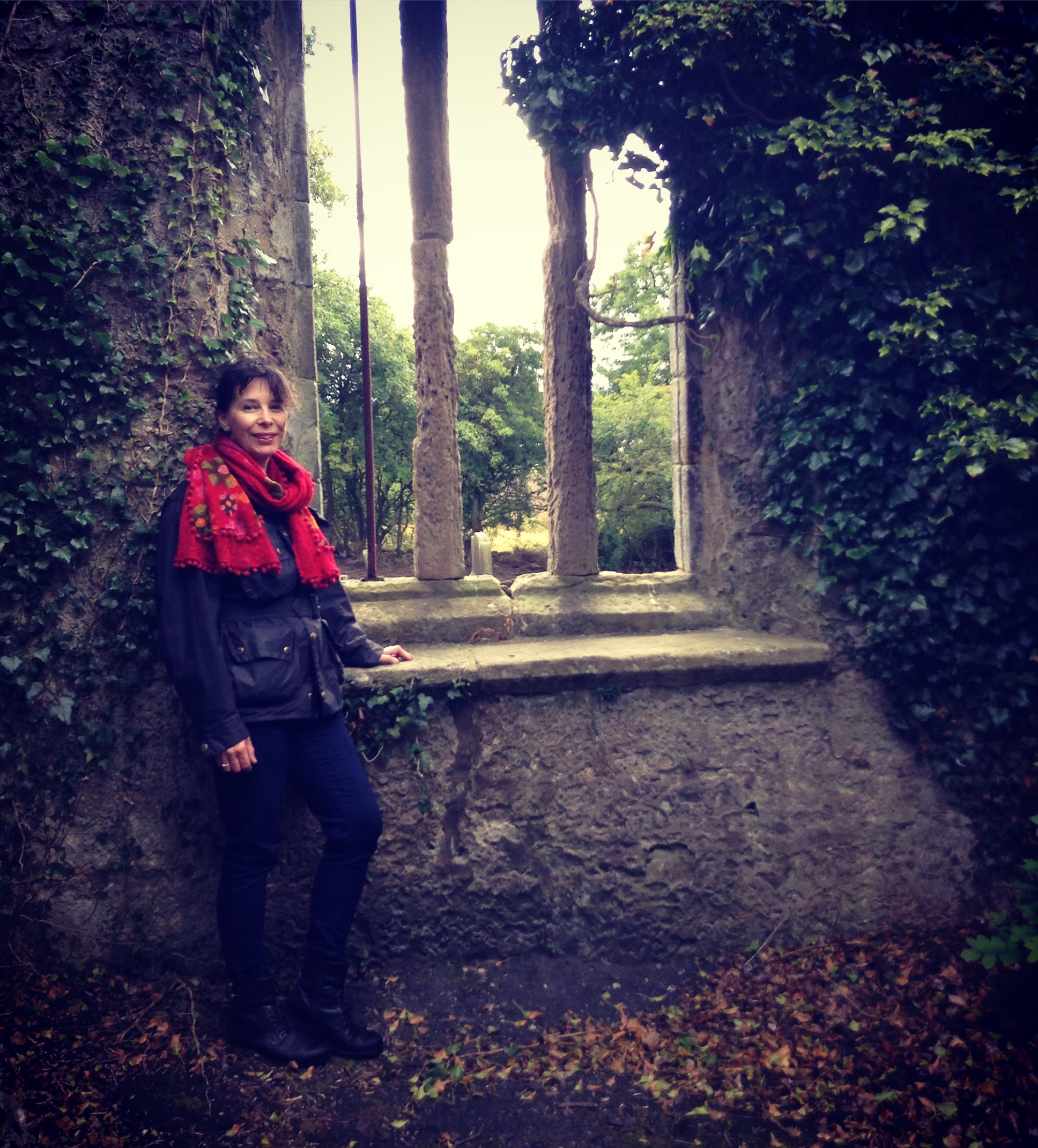
Helen Grant

Helen Grant an author of Gothic novels, now based in Crieff, Scotland. She was a 2011 recipient of the Alex Awards.

== Biography ==
She was educated at Dr Challoner's High School and went on to read classics at St Hugh's College, Oxford.

Her first novel, The Vanishing of Katharina Linden, was published by Penguin Books in April 2009. It was shortlisted for the Booktrust Teenage Prize and the CILIP Carnegie Medal. Laura Wilson, writing for The Guardian, called it "an eerily subtle literary page-turner" that doesn't contain anything "remotely winsome or mawkish". The Independent's Barry Forshaw praised the books ability to shift perceptions from the teenager protagonist's pursuit of mystical answers to adult's skepticism. Grant states that the book was inspired by the legends of the German town in which she spent time while growing up. The book has also been published in Germany as Die Mädchen des Todes, and has been published in Spain, Holland and the US.

Her latest novels are Ghost (2018), Too Near The Dead (2021) and Jump Cut (2023), the last of which is about a notorious fictional lost movie entitled The Simulacrum. The Independent described Jump Cut as "a chilling, highly atmospheric tale."

Her short fiction and non fiction have been published in Supernatural Tales, All Hallows, Nightmare Abbey and various anthologies including Titan's recent In These Hallowed Halls. She has also provided a new translation of E.T.A. Hoffmann's "The Abandoned House" in The Sandman & Other Night Pieces (Tartarus Press). Her book of uncanny short stories, The Sea Change & Other Stories, was published by Swan River Press in 2013.
