= The Mammoth Book of Victorian & Edwardian Ghost Stories =

The Mammoth Book of Victorian & Edwardian Ghost Stories is a story anthology edited by Richard Dalby and published by Robinson Publishing.

== Plot summary ==
The Mammoth Book of Victorian & Edwardian Ghost Stories is an anthology of 43 tales from the Victorian and Edwardian eras.

== Reception ==
Bob Barker reviewed The Mammoth Book of Victorian & Edwardian Ghost Stories for Arcane magazine, rating it a 7 out of 10 overall. Barker comments that "Disappointingly few of the 43 tales have a sense of fun, but then these were people busy with marital rape and fitting small boys in chimneys. I'd have liked to have seen it stretch a little but you can't fault its style, and the editor's notes are brief and sharp. A splendid read."

== Reviews ==
- Review by Don D'Ammassa (1996) in Science Fiction Chronicle, #189 May/June 1996
- Review by Darrell Schweitzer (1997) in The New York Review of Science Fiction, December 1997
