= Delyth =

Delyth is a given name. Notable people with the name include:

- Delyth Badder, Welsh folklorist and writer
- Delyth Evans (born 1958), Welsh politician
- Delyth Jewell, (born 1987 or 1988) Welsh politician
- Delyth Morgan, Baroness Morgan of Drefelin (born 1961), British life peer
