= Weighell =

Weighell is a surname. Notable people with the surname include:

- James Weighell (born 1994), English cricketer
- Ron Weighell (1950–2020), British fiction writer
- Sidney Weighell (1922–2002), British trade unionist and union secretary
- William Weighell (1846–1905), English cricketer
