= Ghost Story Society =

Supernatural fiction not-for-profit literary society

The Ghost Story Society was a not-for-profit literary society whose members shared an interest in supernatural fiction. Founded in Britain in 1988 by Rosemary Pardoe, Jeffrey Dempsey, David Cowperthwaite and Mark Valentine, it had an international membership and was later administered by joint organizers Christopher Roden and Barbara Roden, owners of Ash-Tree Press, with the assistance of David G. Rowlands, Richard Dalby, Jan Arter, and Roger Dobson. It has not been active since 2007.

The society produced the journal All Hallows, which featured new ghostly fiction, along with studies of the works and lives of such authors of classic ghost stories as M. R. James, J. Sheridan Le Fanu, Algernon Blackwood, H. Russell Wakefield, E. F. Benson, A. N. L. Munby, and R. R. Ryan, as well as more recent authors such as Robert Aickman, Elizabeth Jane Howard, Terry Lamsley, and Jonathan Aycliffe. It also included detailed reviews and notices of recent ghostly publications and films, letters from members, and a column by Ramsey Campbell. All Hallows received the 2003 International Horror Guild Award for best periodical.
