= Feardorcha Ó Conaill =

Feardorcha Ó Conaill or Frederick William O'Connell (22 October 1876 – 19 October 1929) was a Church of Ireland clergyman, writer, and translator to and from Irish often under the pen name Conall Cearnach (after the legendary hero). He is known especially for editing the work of Peadar Ó Laoghaire.

Ó Conaill was born in Newtown, Leenaun, County Galway to William Morgan O'Connell, a Church of Ireland canon, and his wife Catherine Donnelly. Leenaun was in the Gaeltacht of Connemara, and William's parents were fluent Irish-speakers who taught him the language at the age of six. He attended Trinity College, Dublin from 1891 and was ordained in 1902. He became rector of Achonry in 1907 and afterwards obtained a post as lecturer in Celtic languages and literature at Queen's University, Belfast.

Ó Conaill married Helen Young in 1905; they had three sons before she died of tuberculosis in 1925 after the couple moved to Dublin. He later married Marcella Graham, a French Catholic, and may have informally converted to Catholicism. He became assistant director of Radio Éireann in 1927, months before he was struck and killed by a bus driver while hailing a tram on Lansdowne Road, Dublin.

== Bibliography ==
He translated works from Spanish, Persian and Arabic.

- A Grammar of Old Irish Belfast, Mayne, 1912
- The Writings on the Wall Dublin, Gill, 1915
- The Age of Whitewash Dublin, Gill, 1921
- The Fatal Move and Other Stories Dublin, Gill, 1924; Swan River Press, 2021
- An Irish Corpus Astronomiae with R.M. Henry, London and Belfast, 1915
- Don Quixote by M. Cervantes (translation)
- The Midnight Court by Brian Merriman (translation)
- My Own Story by an tAth. Peadar Ó Laoghaire (translation)
- Three Shafts of Death by Seathrún Céitinn (translation)
