= Queer as Folklore =

2025 non-fiction book by Sacha Coward

- Author: Sacha Coward
- Language: English
- Genre: Folklore, Queer History
- Publisher: Manchester University Press
- Publication date: November 18, 2025
- Publication place: Manchester, England, UK
- Media type: Print, e-book
- Pages: 352
- ISBN: 9781800183360

Queer as Folklore: The Hidden History of Myths and Monsters is a 2025 debut non-fiction book by British writer and museum archivist Sacha Coward. Published by Manchester University Press, the book explores themes of queer history, folklore, mythology, and the ways LGBTQ+ identities have been represented, coded, and preserved through stories of myths and monsters across cultures.

== Plot ==
The book takes readers on a journey across continents and centuries, uncovering the stories of unsung heroes and villains. Drawing on archival images, museum collections, and galleries from around the world, it investigates queer histories through mythological and folkloric figures.

Coward explores a wide range of subjects, including ancient Greece, RuPaul's Drag Race, cross-dressing pirates, the radical fairies, and the graves of notable queer figures. The opening chapter invites readers to imagine themselves at Pride parades in major cities around the world, setting the stage for an exploration of queer history, culture, and identity.

== Reception ==
In its review, Publishers Weekly described the book as “offering a welcome rebuke to those who would prefer to brand queerness as a subversive interloper only now being injected into traditional tales.” Patrick Ness, author of the Chaos Walking series, described the book as “one delight after another” and praised it as a story told with “an open heart, a questing curiosity, and a healthy sense of mischief.”

Pink News described it as exploring the “weird resonance,” of queer people simply wanting to see something of themselves reflected in history.

== Awards ==
- Longlisted for the 2025 Polari Prize
- Winner of the 2025 British Fantasy Award for Best Non-Fiction
