= The Late Breakfasters =

First edition

The Late Breakfasters is a novel by English writer Robert Aickman, first published in the United Kingdom in 1964 by Victor Gollancz. It was reprinted in the United Kingdom by Chivers in 1978 and by Faber & Faber in 2014. Valancourt Books published a U.S. edition in 2016. It is the only novel published by the author in his lifetime, who was better known for his short stories.
