= Night Voices: Strange Stories =

1985 collection by Robert Aickman

Night Voices: Strange Stories is a collection by Robert Aickman published in 1985.

== Plot summary ==
Night Voices: Strange Stories is a collection of six horror tales.

== Reception ==
Dave Langford reviewed Night Voices: Strange Stories for White Dwarf #68, and stated that "Shadows fall obliquely; something is half-seen at the corner of the eye; the telling is quiet and understated, but shivers lurk in the implications. Nothing is ever explained. Those who only giggle at H P Lovecraft will find Aickman expert at raising small, persistent goose-pimples."

== Reviews ==
- Review by Chris Morgan (1985) in Fantasy Review, June 1985
- Review by Nigel Richardson (1985) in Vector 128
