= R. R. Ryan =

British author

Evelyn Bradley
- Born: 14 December 1882; Waterloo, Lancashire, England
- Died: 18 October 1950 (aged 67); Hove, Sussex, England
- Occupations: Dramatist, actor, theatre manager, novelist
- Spouse(s): Elizabeth Hornsby; Annie Howard
- Children: At least 1
- Writing career
- Pen name: R.R. Ryan (novelist); Rex Ryan (theatre); Cameron Carr (novelist); John Galton (novelist); Dennis Bradley
- Period: 1925–1940
- Genres: Horror, psychological thriller
- Literary movement: Dark romanticism

R(ex) R. Ryan, a pseudonym of Evelyn Bradley (1882–1950), was the author of twelve published horror/thriller novels.

== Identity ==
There can be few authors in the horror–thriller genre as elusive as R. R. Ryan. Until recently no biographical details about this author were known. Interest in the work of R. R. Ryan was limited to a few hard-core collectors until Karl Edward Wagner included three Ryan titles in his well-known lists of best horror novels for Twilight Zone magazine in 1983.

Following Wagner's death, Ramsey Campbell acquired his collection of Ryan books and subsequently published the first critical article on Ryan in Necrofile. Campbell also wrote an entry on Ryan for the St James Guide to Horror, Ghost and Gothic Writers.

In 2002, Midnight House reprinted Echo of a Curse with an introduction by D. H. Olsen with full descriptions and critical appraisal of all of the R. R. Ryan novels. Like earlier commentators, Olsen maintained that Ryan was a woman, in part "due to Ryan's inability to depict convincing male characters, while her female characters are much more fully drawn", as well as "significant examples of typically female outlooks and attitudes pervading even the most male-dominated of her novels".

An article in the Ghost Story Society journal All Hallows revealed the existence of R. R. Ryan’s publishing contracts in the archives of Random House. The contracts indicate that one person appears to have been responsible for all of the Ryan novels, along with four others which appeared under two different names: three under the name Cameron Carr and one under the name John Galton. A children's book by Cameron Carr called The Thought Reader was published by W. Barton in the first half of the 1940s.

Research has shown that Rex Ryan was a pseudonym used by Evelyn Bradley, a theatrical manager who was born in Waterloo, Lancashire, in December 1882, and who lived much of his adult life in Hove, Sussex. He is known to have written several plays in the same sensationalist vein as his novels. His daughter Denise Jeanette Bradley Ryan (1915–1999) also wrote, under the name Kay Seaton. Bradley took his own life in October 1950.

== Works ==
R. R. Ryan's work is variable in quality but much of it is literate, considering its often disturbing subject matter. In most of the books the plot device is the same: a menacing male father figure preys upon a vulnerable young girl. This is a standard device of gothic drama and early film (and of such novels as Sheridan Le Fanu's Uncle Silas).

The explicit threat of sexual violence is ever present in a Ryan novel, and this alone makes it unusual for a Herbert Jenkins book of the 1930s. Furthermore, the author controls the mounting tension in a way that can leave many readers feeling almost as traumatised as the fictional characters. These two aspects, coupled with the ingenuity of the plots, has made Ryan a popular author among connoisseurs of vintage weird fiction.

The novels published under the name Cameron Carr explore very similar though less fantastical paths. Although written with the same verve and style, these novels possess a deeper psychological depth than the R. R. Ryan books, suggesting that the author wished to compartmentalise his life by keeping the use of the names separate.

== Bibliography ==
Title	Year	Genre	Notes
The Tyranny of Virtue	April 1925	Psychological thriller	As Noel Despard
crime thriller
The Right to Kill	April 1936	Psychological thriller	Cheap edition: January 1940
Deals with the theme of justified homicide
Death of a Sadist	January 1937	Psychological thriller	Cheap editions: January 1938 (Success Library) and March 1939 (Popular Library)
A young couple exact revenge upon a sadistic man who has taken sexual advantage of a vulnerable young woman.
Devil's Shelter	September 1937	Horror, psychological thriller	Cheap edition: September 1938
A young actress is stranded in a mental hospital where the "lunatics have taken over the asylum."
A New Face at the Door	October 1937	Psychological thriller	As Cameron Carr. Cheap edition: November 1938
Set in a boarding-house; the characters are members of a repertory company in a provincial theatre. The theme is treated with insight and humour.
The Subjugated Beast	January 1938	Horror fiction, psychological thriller	Cheap edition: March 1939 (Success Library)
A cruel scientist subjects his wife to a diet of raw meat to see whether it affects her mental state.
Gilded Clay	February 1938	Psychological thriller	As Cameron Carr. Cheap editions: March 1939 and March 1940
A surgeon violently opposed to abortion falls in love with a pregnant woman who wishes to abort her pregnancy.
Freak Museum	July 1938	Horror fiction, psychological thriller	
A young Irish girl finds herself imprisoned in a sinister hospital with some very unpleasant monsters.
The Other	July 1938	Psychological thriller	As Cameron Carr. Abridgement (96 pp.): Mellifont Press, [1942]
A man is driven insane by two conflicting personalities, one of which is evil.
Echo of a Curse	March 1939	Horror fiction, psychological thriller	Cheap edition: August 1940 (Success Library). Reprinted in 2002 by Midnight House, including an essay by D. H. Olsen, titled "Honor, Sadism and Dysfunction: The Dark, Demented World of R. R. Ryan"
Supernatural horror novel involving typical Ryan themes of sadism and romance, with vampirism and lycanthropy thrown in for good measure.
The Stars I Kneel To	March 1939	Psychological thriller	As John Galton. Cheap edition: April 1940
Romance with typical Ryan theme of psychological torture.
No Escape	April 1940	Psychological thriller	
The identical sister of murdered woman turns up at the husband's house to take her sister's place. The novel is notable for its darkly comic, almost farcical plot.
