= The Unfortunate Fursey =

Satirical fantasy novel by Mervyn Wall

The Unfortunate Fursey is a 1946 satirical fantasy by the writer Mervyn Wall.

== Plot ==
A mediaeval Irish monastery is invaded by demons. The monks counter the invasion by reciting the rite of exorcism. Fursey suffers from a stammer and cannot recite the prayers quickly enough to stop the demons. He is blamed for the invasion and banished from the monastery. Fursey, accompanied by a demon, tries to find his place in the world.
