= Leaves for the Burning =

Book by Mervyn Wall

- First edition
- Author: Mervyn Wall
- Publisher: Methuen
- Publication date: 1952

Leaves for the Burning is Mervyn Wall's third novel, and his first non-humorous work. Set in a small town in the Irish midlands, it explores the passing of youth and opportunity and the onset of premature aging, against the backdrop of a fiercely-insular community.
