= Robert Aickman =

British writer and conservationist (1914–1981)

- Born: Robert Fordyce Aickman; 27 June 1914; London, England
- Died: 26 February 1981 (aged 66); London, England
- Education: Highgate School
- Occupations: Writer, conservationist
- Spouse: Edith Ray Gregorson (m. 1941; div. 1957)
- Relatives: Richard Marsh (grandfather)
- Writing career
- Genres: Horror, Supernatural
- Notable works: Cold Hand in Mine; Sub Rosa "Ringing the Changes"; The Late Breakfasters
- Notable awards: World Fantasy Award

Robert Fordyce Aickman (27 June 1914 – 26 February 1981) was an English writer and conservationist. As a conservationist, he co-founded the Inland Waterways Association, a group which has preserved from destruction and restored England's inland canal system. As a writer, he is best known for his supernatural fiction, which he described as "strange stories". Aickman's fiction often relied on unsettling atmosphere and indirect suggestion, along with characters who experience "dislocation in time and space", rather than explicit depiction of supernatural or gory events.

The writer of his obituary in The Times, as quoted by Mike Ashley, said: "... his most outstanding and lasting achievement was as a writer of what he himself like to call 'strange tales.' He brought to these his immense knowledge of the occult, psychological insights and a richness of background and characterisation which rank his stories with those of M. R. James and Walter de la Mare." Ashley himself wrote:

Aickman's writings are an acquired taste like fine wines. I have no doubt that his work will always remain unknown to the majority of readers, and perhaps he would have wanted it that way. He wrote what and how he wanted, for expression, not for popularity. In another of his letters to me he said "I have received a good deal of esteem, but never a big commercial success, and am usually wondering whether anything by me will ever be published again." ... It is astonishing that someone of Aickman's stature should have difficulty in selling his work. Perhaps now, too late for Aickman's benefit, someone will have the sense to publish it.

This situation has since been remedied by an extensive programme of reprints of Aickman's work by Tartarus Press, Faber, and New York Review Books Classics.

Robert Aickman: An Attempted Biography (2022), by R. B. Russell, is the first full-length biography of Aickman.

== Life ==
Aickman was born in London, England, the son of architect William Arthur Aickman and Mabel Violet Marsh. He attended Highgate School from January 1928 until July 1931. Mike Ashley reported that at the time he compiled his Who's Who in Horror and Fantasy Fiction, Aickman objected to the inclusion of his date of birth. Instead he said that the entry should read "Aickman, Robert. Man of Mystery". "That", he said, "would be helpful. I should approve entirely." On his mother's side, Aickman was the grandson of the prolific Victorian novelist Richard Marsh (1857–1915), known for his occult thriller The Beetle (1897), a book as popular in its time as Bram Stoker's Dracula.

He was involved in an investigation into the well-known haunting of Borley Rectory. Another indication of his lifelong interest in the supernatural is his longstanding membership of The Ghost Club. He remarked in a letter to Mike Ashley, "What impact such things have had on me, and the sources of my inspiration, are simply too much for a letter. If you wish to pursue such topics, I shall be pleased to have a talk." Unfortunately that talk never took place, but Ashley points out that Aickman's early life, including some supernatural episodes, will be found detailed in his autobiography, The Attempted Rescue (Gollancz, 1966).

He originally helped with some clerical work in his father's architectural office. In the opening lines of The Attempted Rescue, Aickman described his father as "the oddest man I have ever known".

Of Aickman's character, Elizabeth Jane Howard said in a 2011 interview at the Tartarus Press blog, that he "hated children" and of his childhood that "He told me about his childhood but I think he exaggerated that. I went to the house in Stanmore where he was brought up, and his mother did go and leave him, and that probably had a much worse effect than he realised on him. He was reading by the time he was four and he went to very good schools. Highgate was a very good school. I think it probably was a fairly lonely childhood. … He could be very prickly and difficult, or he could be very charming. He certainly had the gift of the gab."

Aickman was married to literary agent and children's book author Edith Ray Gregorson (1914–1983) (known as 'Ray') from 1941 to 1957. She authored Lemuel (illustrated by Peter Scott, husband of Elizabeth Jane Howard, with whom Aickman had an affair) and Timothy Tramcar.

He had been responsible for the general direction of the very successful Market Harborough Festival of Boats and Yachts, attended by more than 50,000 visitors. This was topped in 1962 when he directed the Waterborne concert with fireworks at the City of London Festival, with an audience of 100,000.

With a keen interest in the theatre, ballet, and music, Aickman also served as a chairman of the London Opera Society (1954–69) and was active in the London Opera Club, the Ballet Minerva, and the Mikron Theatre Company (a company which performs via touring the canal waterways of Britain).

In the mid-1970s, Aickman lived in a flat in Willoughby House on the Barbican Estate. In 1977 he moved to a flat in Gledhow Gardens, Earl's Court, where he lived until his death.

Aickman was diagnosed with cancer in the winter of 1979. He refused to have conventional treatment and consulted a homoeopath. He had planned to go to the US in the autumn of 1980, to receive a fantasy award, but he was too ill to travel, despite rallying in the summer. He died in the Royal London Homeopathic Hospital on 26 February 1981. His obituary appeared in The Times on 28 February. Later, there was a memorial concert at the Royal Society of Arts, at which various well-known people, including the naturalist Sir Peter Scott, paid tribute to him.

In 2015, R. B. Russell and Rosalie Parker of Tartarus Press released a feature-length documentary on the life and work of Robert Aickman, which was premiered at the World Fantasy Convention. It includes interviews with friends of Robert Aickman and with the authors Reggie Oliver and Jeremy Dyson. It can now be seen on YouTube.

== Conservation ==
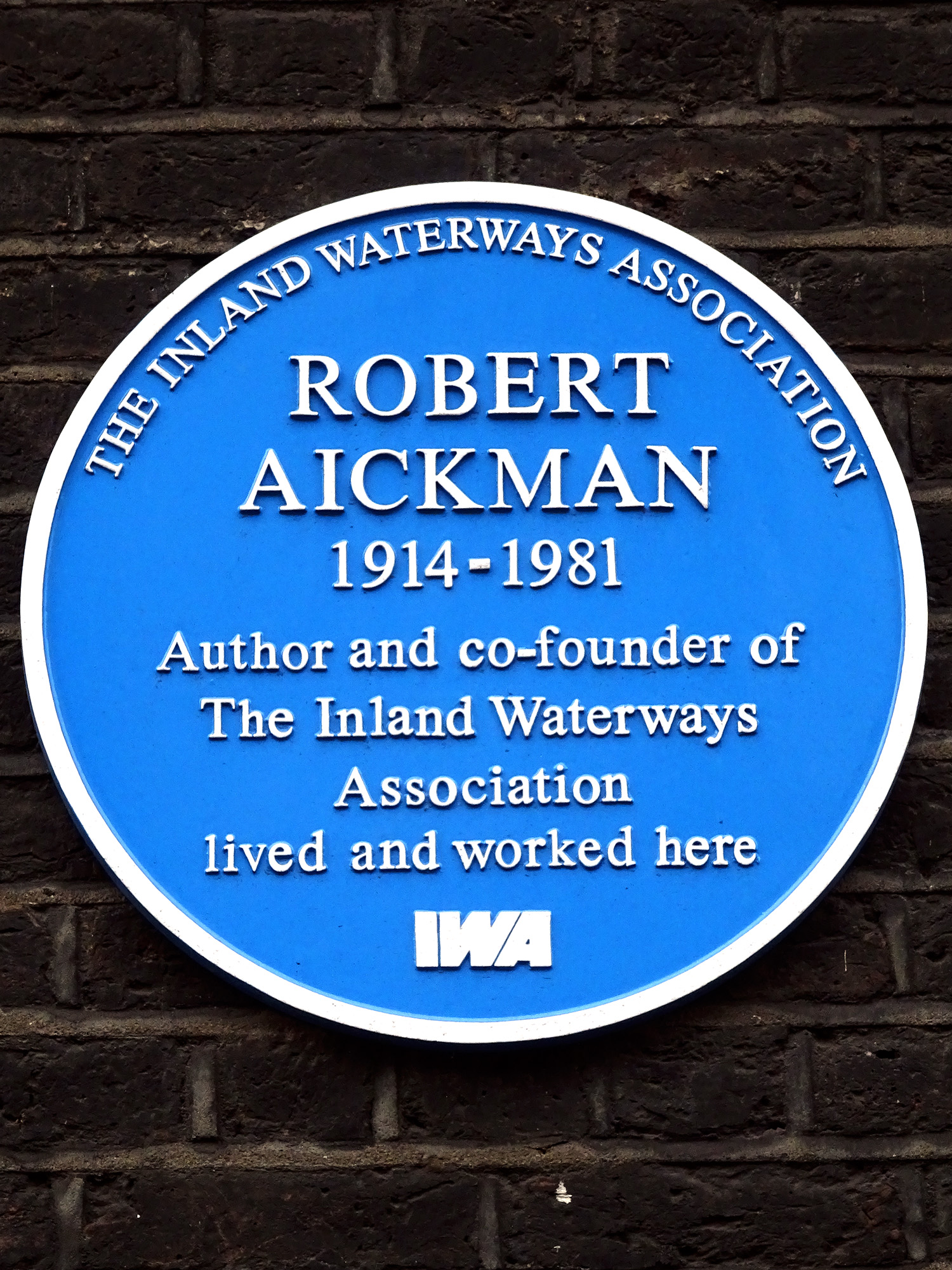
Plaque at 11 Gower Street, London

Aickman is probably best remembered for his co-founding of the Inland Waterways Association, a group devoted to restoring and preserving England's then-neglected and largely derelict inland canal system.

The association was sparked off by a letter sent by Aickman to L. T. C. Rolt following the publication in 1944 of Rolt's highly successful book Narrow Boat, describing the declining and largely unknown world of the British canals. The inaugural meeting took place on 15 February 1946 in London, with Aickman as chairman and Rolt as honorary secretary.

The IWA organised successful campaigns and attracted notable supporters, including as president the writer and parliamentarian Sir A. P. Herbert and as vice-president the naturalist Peter Scott. Scott's wife, Elizabeth Jane Howard, was part-time secretary, working in Aickman's flat in Gower Street; she had an affair with Aickman, which she describes in her autobiography Slipstream (Macmillan, 2002).

Aickman began to have policy disagreements with Rolt. Aickman wanted to campaign to keep all of the waterways open, whereas Rolt had sympathies with the traditional canal workers and believed it necessary to prioritise which canals could be kept open. The disagreement became public: Aickman had organised the IWA's first boat rally and festival in August 1950 and attempted to prevent Rolt from attending and promoting his book The Inland Waterways of England; nevertheless, Rolt attended, as did his publisher, Philip Unwin. Aickman engineered a change to the rules to require all members to conform to agreed IWA principles, and in early 1951 Rolt and others were excluded from membership. Aickman published two nonfiction books on the waterways in 1955.

Nevertheless, the IWA has been one of the most successful conservation organisations in British history, succeeding in restoring and reopening much of the original canal network.

== Literary work ==
=== Fiction ===
As a writer, Aickman is best known for the 48 "strange stories" that were published in eight volumes, one of them posthumous. The American collection Painted Devils consists of revised versions of stories which had previously appeared in other books.

After three of his stories appeared in We Are for the Dark (1954), occasional short stories appeared in magazines and anthologies during the rest of the 1950s, but Aickman's involvement with his many societies kept him from any writing at length. The year 1964 thus came as a watershed, with a slightly mystical novel, The Late Breakfasters, a story collection (Dark Entries) and the first Fontana Book of Great Ghost Stories, which he edited for eight volumes. "Those, if any, who wish to know more about me", Aickman wrote in 1965, "should plunge beneath the frivolous surface of The Late Breakfasters." Opening as a comedy of manners, its playful seriousness slowly fades into an elegiac variation on the great Greek myth of thwarted love.

His own subsequent collections were Powers of Darkness (1966), Sub Rosa (1968), Cold Hand in Mine (1976), Tales of Love and Death (1977) and Intrusions (1980).

In the essay that Aickman wrote in response to receiving a World Fantasy Award, he wrote:

I believe in what the Germans term Ehrfurcht: reverence for things one cannot understand. Faust's error was an aspiration to understand, and therefore master, things which, by God or by nature, are set beyond the human compass. He could only achieve this at the cost of making the achievement pointless. Once again, it is exactly what modern man has done. ...

I believe in life after death, and I decline to particularize upon the meaning of the words, because of all futile and reductionist attempts at definition, this is the most idle. ... Most of my stories aim at universal themes, however difficult it may be to attain to them.

Cold Hand in Mine and Painted Devils featured dust jacket drawings by acclaimed gothic illustrator Edward Gorey. August Derleth proposed that Arkham House should publish a book of Aickman's best stories, but was unable to meet the author's demands and withdrew the proposal. The original collections of short stories are quite scarce, though copies of the U.S. edition of Cold Hand in Mine are very plentiful.

The Model: A Novel of the Fantastic (New York: Arbor House, 1987) was a novella which remained unpublished in his lifetime. Aickman had hoped to have the work illustrated by Edward Gorey. According to Mike Ashley, "Aickman bemoaned the lack of publisher interest in this work of about 35,000 words."

Tartarus Press published a new collection of unpublished and uncollected fiction and non-fiction in 2015 as The Strangers and Other Writings. In 2018, NYRB Classics released Compulsory Games: And Other Stories (edited and with an introduction by Victoria Nelson), a collection of previously published short stories culled primarily from 1977's Tales of Love and Death.

==== Awards ====
In 1975, Aickman received the World Fantasy Award—Short Fiction for his story "Pages from a Young Girl's Journal". This story had originally appeared in February 1973 in The Magazine of Fantasy & Science Fiction; it was reprinted in Cold Hand in Mine. The winning of this award pleased Aickman immensely, as at that time he considered it his best story.

In 1981, the year of his death, Aickman was awarded the British Fantasy Award for his story "The Stains", which had first appeared in the anthology New Terrors (London: Pan, 1980), edited by Ramsey Campbell. It subsequently appeared posthumously in Night Voices.

==== Adaptations ====
In 1968, a television adaptation of Aickman's short story "Ringing the Changes", retitled "The Bells of Hell", appeared on the BBC 2 programme Late Night Horror. A radio play version based on "Ringing the Changes" was broadcast on the CBC Radio drama series Nightfall on 31 October 1980.

In 1987, HTV West produced a six-episode anthology series for television called Night Voices, of which four were based upon stories by Aickman: "The Hospice", "The Inner Room", "Hand in Glove" and "The Trains".

A 1997 adaptation of "The Swords" by Howard A. Rodman was directed by Tony Scott. It appeared as the first episode of the cable original horror anthology series The Hunger.

Jeremy Dyson has adapted Aickman's work into drama in a number of forms. A musical staging of his short story "The Same Dog", for which Dyson co-wrote the libretto with Joby Talbot, premiered in 2000 at the Barbican Concert Hall. In 2000, with his League of Gentlemen collaborator Mark Gatiss, Dyson adapted Aickman's short story "Ringing the Changes" into a BBC Radio Four radio play. This aired exactly twenty years after the CBC adaptation, on Halloween 2000. Dyson also directed a 2002 short film based on Aickman's story "The Cicerones" with Gatiss as the principal actor.

In August 2019, BBC Radio 4 Extra broadcast five of Aickman's short stories as part of its Short Works series. "Just a Song at Twilight", "Le Miroir", "Raising the Wind", "The Coffin House" and "The Fully-Conducted Tour" were read by Tim McInnerny.

=== As editor ===
In addition to writing his own stories, Aickman edited the first eight volumes of the Fontana Book of Great Ghost Stories between 1964 and 1972. He was assisted in this by Christine Bernard, an editor at Collins. He selected six of his own stories for inclusion over the course of the series. The fourth and sixth volumes lack one of his tales. He also supplied an introduction for every volume except the sixth.

=== Nonfiction ===
Aickman's autobiographical writing consists of the two memoirs The Attempted Rescue (London: Victor Gollancz, 1966) and The River Runs Uphill: A Story of Success and Failure (Burton-on-Trent: Pearson, 1986). In 2001, Tartarus Press reissued the former volume in a new edition with a foreword by the writer and Aickman enthusiast Jeremy Dyson. Tartarus also reprinted the latter, with extra text which had been edited out of the first edition.

For a time, Aickman served as theatre critic for The Nineteenth Century and After. His reviews remain, to date, uncollected in book form. He also wrote two books relating to his conservation activities, Know Your Waterways and The Story of Our Inland Waterways (both 1955).

=== Unpublished works ===
Aickman produced a number of works that remain unpublished. These include the plays Allowance for Error, Duty and The Golden Round. A philosophical work entitled Panacea: The Synthesis of an Attitude runs to over 1,000 pages in manuscript form. Copies of these items are preserved, along with Aickman's manuscripts and other papers, in the Robert Aickman Collection at the British Library, with some papers deposited at Bowling Green State University, Ohio.

== Bibliography ==
=== Fiction ===
==== Novels ====
- The Late Breakfasters. London: Victor Gollancz, 1964. Library reprint: Bath: Cedric Chivers, 1978. Reprint: London: Faber Finds, 2014; Richmond, VA: Valancourt Books, 2016, ISBN 978-0-571-31684-7
- The Model. New York: Arbor House, 1987. Reprint: London: Faber Finds, 2014, ISBN 978-0-571-31682-3
- Go Back at Once. Tartarus Press, 2020 (a novel written in the 1970s, which remained unpublished until this limited edition of 500 copies). Reprint: Sheffield: And Other Stories, 2022, ISBN 978-1-913505-20-2

==== Short story collections ====
===== Original collections =====
- We Are for the Dark: Six Ghost Stories. London: Jonathan Cape, 1951. (Collection containing three stories by Elizabeth Jane Howard and the following three by Aickman):
  - "The Trains" (first published in The Tatler, Christmas 1951, as by Elizabeth Jane Howard and Robert Aickman)
  - "The Insufficient Answer"
  - "The View"

Note: Howard's stories here are collected, with an additional story, "Mr Wrong" in her Three Miles Up and Other Strange Stories (Tartarus Press, ISBN 1-872621-75-9).

- Dark Entries: Curious and Macabre Ghost Stories. London: Collins, 1964. Reprint: London: Faber, 2014.
  - "The School Friend"
  - "Ringing the Changes"
  - "Choice of Weapons"
  - "The Waiting Room" (first published in The Sketch, Christmas 1956)
  - "The View"
  - "Bind Your Hair"
- Powers of Darkness: Macabre Stories. London: Collins, 1966.
  - "Your Tiny Hand Is Frozen" (first published in The Tatler, Christmas 1953)
  - "My Poor Friend"
  - "The Visiting Star" (first published in The Tatler, 13 November 1952)
  - "Larger than Oneself"
  - "A Roman Question"
  - "The Wine-Dark Sea"
- Sub Rosa: Strange Tales. London: Victor Gollancz, 1968.
  - "Ravissante"
  - "The Inner Room"
  - "Never Visit Venice"
  - "The Unsettled Dust"
  - "The Houses of the Russians"
  - "No Stronger than a Flower"
  - "The Cicerones"
  - "Into the Wood"
- Cold Hand in Mine: Eight Strange Stories. London: Victor Gollancz, 1975. Reprint: Faber, 2014, with a new introduction, "Uneasy Does It: An Introduction to Robert Aickman" by Reece Shearsmith and a new afterword, "Memories of a Friend", by Jean Richardson.
  - "The Swords"
  - "The Real Road to the Church"
  - "Niemandswasser"
  - "Pages from a Young Girl's Journal"
  - "The Hospice"
  - "The Same Dog"
  - "Meeting Mr Millar"
  - "The Clock Watcher"
- Tales of Love and Death. London: Victor Gollancz, 1977.
  - "Growing Boys"
  - "Marriage"
  - "Le Miroir"
  - "Compulsory Games"
  - "Raising the Wind"
  - "Residents Only"
  - "Wood"
- Intrusions: Strange Tales. London: Victor Gollancz, 1980.
  - "Hand in Glove"
  - "No Time Is Passing"
  - "The Fetch"
  - "The Breakthrough"
  - "The Next Glade"
  - "Letters to the Postman"
- Night Voices: Strange Stories. London: Victor Gollancz, 1985. (Reprints "The Trains" and also includes the following):
  - "The Stains"
  - "Just a Song at Twilight"
  - "Laura"
  - "Rosamund's Bower"
  - "Mark Ingestre: The Customer's Tale"
- The Strangers and Other Writings. Tartarus Press, 2015. (Collects unpublished and uncollected fiction and non-fiction. Fiction only listed here):
  - "The Case of Wallingford's Tiger"
  - "The Whistler"
  - "A Disciple of Plato"
  - "The Coffin House"
  - "The Flying Anglo-Dutchman"
  - "The Strangers"
  - "The Fully-Conducted Tour"

===== Reprint collections =====
- Painted Devils: Strange Stories. New York: Scribner's, 1979. (Revised stories):
  - "Ravissante"
  - "The Houses of the Russians"
  - "The View"
  - "Ringing the Changes"
  - "The School Friend"
  - "The Waiting Room"
  - "Marriage"
  - "Larger than Oneself"
  - "My Poor Friend"
- The Wine-Dark Sea. New York: Arbor House/William Morrow, 1988. Reprint: London: Faber, 2014.
  - "The Wine-Dark Sea"
  - "The Trains"
  - "Your Tiny Hand is Frozen"
  - "Growing Boys"
  - "The Fetch"
  - "The Inner Room"
  - "Never Visit Venice"
  - "The Next Glade" (Removed from Faber edition)
  - "Into the Wood"
  - "Bind Your Hair" (Removed from Faber edition)
  - "The Stains" (Removed from Faber edition)
- The Unsettled Dust. London: Mandarin, 1990. Reprint: London: Faber, 2014.
  - "The Unsettled Dust"
  - "The Houses of the Russians"
  - "No Stronger than a Flower"
  - "The Cicerones"
  - "The Next Glade"
  - "Ravissante"
  - "Bind Your Hair"
  - "The Stains"
- The Collected Strange Stories. Horam, East Sussex: Tartarus/Durtro, 1999. (Two volumes)
- The Late Breakfasters and Other Strange Stories. Richmond, VA: Valancourt, 2016. (Reprints the 1964 novel and the following short stories)
  - "My Poor Friend"
  - "The Visiting Star"
  - "Larger Than Oneself"
  - "A Roman Question"
  - "Mark Ingestre: The Customer's Tale"
  - "Rosamund's Bower"
- Compulsory Games. New York, NY: NYRB Classics, 2018.
  - "Compulsory Games"
  - "Hand in Glove"
  - "Marriage"
  - "Le Miroir"
  - "No Time Is Passing"
  - "Raising the Wind"
  - "Residents Only"
  - "Wood"
  - "The Strangers"
  - "The Coffin House"
  - "Letters to the Postman"
  - "Laura"
  - "The Fully-Conducted Tour"
  - "A Disciple of Plato"
  - "Just a Song at Twilight"

=== Nonfiction ===
- Know Your Waterways. London: Coram, 1955.
- The Story of Our Inland Waterways. London: Pitman, 1955.

=== Autobiography ===
- The Attempted Rescue. London: Victor Gollancz, 1966.
- The River Runs Uphill: A Story of Success and Failure. Burton on Trent: Pearson, 1986.

=== Letters ===
- Robert Aickman: Selected Letters to Kirby McCauley, April 1967 - December 1980. Yorkshire: Tartarus Press, 2024.

== Sources ==
- Crawford, Gary William (2003). Robert Aickman: An Introduction. Baton Rouge: Gothic Press. ISBN 0-913045-10-1.
- Reginald, R. (1979). "Robert Aickman". Science Fiction and Fantasy Literature: A Checklist, 1700–1974, with Contemporary Science Fiction Authors II. Vol. 2. Gale Research Company. p. 791. ISBN 978-0-8103-1051-3.
