= Ebony Elizabeth Thomas =

American writer and educator

- Born: Detroit
- Education: University of Michigan; Wayne State University
- Scientific career
- Workplaces: Wayne State University; Florida A&M University
- Thesis: "We're Saying the Same Thing": How English Teachers Negotiated Solidarity, Identity, and Ethics Through Talk and Interaction. (2010)
- Website: https://www.ebonyelizabeththomas.com/about

Ebony Elizabeth Thomas is an American writer and educator who is a professor at the University of Michigan School of Education. Her research considers children's literature and fan culture. Her book, The Dark Fantastic, was awarded the 2020 Children's Literature Association Book Award.

== Education and early career ==
Thomas was born and raised in Detroit. She studied English Education at Florida A&M University, then completed her master's degree at Wayne State University, with a focus on 19th-Century British and American literature. Thomas joined the University of Michigan for doctoral research, where she studied discourse conflicts in schooling and society. She graduated with her Ph.D. in English and Education in 2010.

After graduating, Thomas worked as a teacher in the Detroit Public Schools Community District. She taught high school English and creative writing. She held various positions on the National Council of Teachers of English, including the Conference on English Education's executive committee. She completed her research in the Pinnacle Classroom Discourse Study Group, a collective of teachers committed to ending the racial awarding gap.

== Research ==
Thomas was appointed an assistant professor at Wayne State University in 2010, before joining the faculty at University of Pennsylvania by 2014. In Pennsylvania, Thomas focused on African-American education and received a 2014 National Academy of Education/Spencer Foundation Postdoctoral Fellowship. In 2021, Thomas joined the faculty of the University of Michigan School of Education. In 2019 Thomas spoke out against Sarah Dessen and a number of other young adult authors on Twitter after a tweet by Dessen lead to the doxxing and harassment of a Northern State University alumni for criticizing Dessen's literary merit.

Thomas is an expert in children's literature, and has argued that it can be a site of social progress. She has investigated the representation of slavery and diversity within children's books.

Thomas was appointed to the advisory board of the Teaching Hard History project. She has researched the representation of people of colour in children's and adult's American literature, and argued that white Americans do not readily share space with non-whites.

"When it comes down to it, sharing space means actually giving up something that you've always had: giving up power, giving up the spotlight, giving up money so that you can share that space. And that's hard for folks."

In 2022, the public criticisms of a Black actress playing the role of Ariel in the live-action retelling of The Little Mermaid prompted Thomas to remark that policing the inclusion of characters of color in adaptions of fictional narratives amounts to an "imagination gap".

=== Writing ===
Thomas' book The Dark Fantastic was released in 2019. The book presents the concept of a "Dark Other" subjected to cycle of "spectacle, hesitation, violence, haunting, and emancipation," using Amandla Stenberg as Rue, Angel Coulby as Gwen, Kat Graham as Bonnie Bennett, and Noma Dumezweni as Hermione Granger as examples. She presents the fantasy and imagination in Black feminism as a means to generate new possibilities. The book was described by the Los Angeles Review of Books as "One of the most radiant and thought-provoking descriptions of the potentials of fantastic literature".

Harry Potter and the Other was released in 2022. The book explores race matters in the wizarding world created by J. K. Rowling.

== Awards and honors ==
- 2020 British Fantasy Awards, Nonfiction
- 2020 World Fantasy Awards
- 2020 Children's Literature Association Book Award

== Selected publications ==
- The Dark Fantastic: Race and the imagination from Harry Potter to the Hunger Games. New York University Press, May 2019.
- Thomas, Ebony Elizabeth; Stornaiuolo, Amy (2016-09-01). "Restorying the Self: Bending Toward Textual Justice". Harvard Educational Review. 86 (3): 313–338. doi:10.17763/1943-5045-86.3.313. ISSN 0017-8055.
- Levy, Brett L. M.; Thomas, Ebony Elizabeth; Drago, Kathryn; Rex, Lesley A. (2013-07-23). "Examining Studies of Inquiry-Based Learning in Three Fields of Education". Journal of Teacher Education. 64 (5): 387–408. doi:10.1177/0022487113496430. ISSN 0022-4871. S2CID 145362658.
