= Lynda E. Rucker =

Author of horror and fantasy short stories

- Born: United States
- Occupation: Writer
- Writing career
- Genre: Horror fiction

Lynda Rucker is an author of horror and fantasy short stories.

== Life ==
Born in Georgia, Rucker moved to Oregon where she lived long enough to feel like it was also home. She has also lived in Dublin, Ireland.

Rucker has an M.A. in English which focused on Medieval Literature. Currently not based anywhere particular Rucker won the 2015 Shirley Jackson award for Best short story for The Dying Season. Rucker is a regular columnist for Black Static and has also had a play produced on London's West End.

Her short stories are also in publications such as The Magazine of Fantasy & Science Fiction, The Mammoth Book of Best New Horror and The Year's Best Dark Fantasy and Horror. Rucker was also part of the team nominated for the Hugo Award for Best Fanzine in 2014. Rucker's collections of short fiction include: The Moon Will Look Strange (2013), You’ll Know When You Get There (2016), and Now It's Dark (2023).

== Bibliography ==
=== Collections and plays ===
- The Moon Will Look Strange, Karōshi Books, 2013
- You’ll Know When You Get There, Swan River Press, 2016
- #goddess, performed at the Tristan Bates Theatre, London, 7–19 March 2016
- Now It's Dark, Swan River Press, 2023

=== Short stories ===
- "The Last Call", Outside a graphic anthology of new horror fiction, with Sean Hogan and Art by Matthew Dunn. Edited by Topics Books, published by Ash Pure 2017
- "The Seance", Uncertainties I, Swan River Press, edited by Brian Showers, August 2016
- "Testimony XVI", Tomorrow’s Cthulhu, Broken Eye Books, January 2016
- "Yellow Bird", Cassilda’s Song, Chaosium, edited by Joe Pulver, 2015
- "The Seventh Wave", TERROR TALES OF THE OCEAN, edited by Paul Finch, Grey Friar Press, December 2015
- "An Element of Blank", Supernatural Tales, special anniversary 30th issue, Autumn 2015
- "The Secret Wood", Soliloquy for Pan, Egaeus Press, June 2015
- "The Dying Season", Aickman’s Heirs, Undertow Press, edited by Simon Strantzas, May 2015
- "The Corner Lot", Dreams of Shadow and Smoke: Tales for J.S. Le Fanu, edited by Jim Rockhill & Brian J. Showers, 2014
- "The Receiver of Tales", Little Visible Delight, 2013
- "This Time of Day, This Time of Year", Postscripts 30/31, 2013
- "The Queen in the Yellow Wallpaper", The Burning Circus, anthology from the British Fantasy Society, 2013
- "The Burned House", The Moon Will Look Strange, 2013
- "These Foolish Things", The Moon Will Look Strange, 2013
- "In Death’s Other Kingdom", The Moon Will Look Strange, 2013
- "The Wife’s Lament", Supernatural Tales #24, August 2013
- "The House on Cobb Street", Nightmare Magazine, June 2013
- "Widdershins", Shadows and Tall Trees #5, Summer 2013
- "Red at the End of the World", Daily Science Fiction, 31 October 2012
- "Where the Summer Dwells", F&SF, September/October 2012
- "The Moon Will Look Strange", Black Static #16, April 2010
- "These Things We Have Always Known", Black Static #8, December 2008
- "Ash-Mouth", Black Static #2, December 2007
- "The Last Reel", Supernatural Tales #10, 2006
- "The Chance Walker", The Third Alternative #33, 2003
- "No More A-Roving", Darkness Rising #1, 2001
- "Beneath the Drops", The Third Alternative #25, November 2000
- "Different Angels", The Third Alternative #19, March 1999
