= Barbara Roden =

Canadian horror writer and editor

- Born: 1963 (age 62–63); Vancouver, British Columbia, Canada

Barbara Roden (born 1963) is a Canadian horror writer and editor.

== Biography ==
Barbara Roden was born in 1963 in Vancouver, British Columbia. She studied journalism. With her husband Christopher Roden, she founded Ash-Tree Press in 1994. She is editor of All Hallows for the Ghost Story Society. She is a longstanding Sherlock Holmes fan, and she and her husband have edited a number of titles as well as one she wrote. Roden has won World Fantasy Awards as editor and publisher. She has also written fiction and her work has gained awards.

Roden now lives in Ashcroft, British Columbia, and in 2018 she was elected mayor of the village. She is the editor of the Ashcroft-Cache Creek Journal and in 2018 was awarded the Jack Webster Award for community reporting.

== Awards ==
- 1997 World Fantasy Awards—special award
- 2000 Bram Stoker Awards—specialty press award
- 2005 World Fantasy Awards—anthology, Acquainted with the Night
- 2005 International Horror Guild Awards—anthology, Acquainted with the Night

== Bibliography ==
=== As author ===
- Northwest Passages (2009)

=== As editor or co-editor ===
- All Hallows (journal, 1994–2007)
- Lady Stanhope's Manuscript and Other Supernatural Tales (1994)
- Forgotten Ghosts: The Supernatural Anthologies of Hugh Lamb (1996)
- Midnight Never Comes (1997)
- Shadows and Silence (2000)
- Acquainted with the Night (2004)
- At Ease with the Dead (2007)
- Shades of Darkness (2008)

=== Short fiction ===
- "Dead Man's Pears" (1994)
- "The Adventure of the Suspect Servant" (1997)
- "Tourist Trap" (2000)
- "Northwest Passage" (2004)
- "The Appointed Time" (2005)
- "The Palace" (2007)
- "The Wide, Wide Sea" (2007)
- "The Hiding Place" (2007)
- "Association Copy" (2008)
- "Endless Night" (2008)
- "Back Roads" (2008)
- "The Things That Shall Come upon Them" (2008)
- "The Haunted House in Etobicoke" (2009)
- "The Brink of Eternity" (2009)
- "After" (2009)
- "Out and Back" (2009)
- "Home on the Range" (2009)
- "Flu Season" (2010)
- "404" (2011)
- "Sweet Sorrow" (2011)
- "Night Visitors" (2012)
- "All Souls Day" (2013)
- "Undesirable Residence" (2013)
- "Strone House" (2015)
