= Mervyn Wall =

Irish writer (1908–1997)

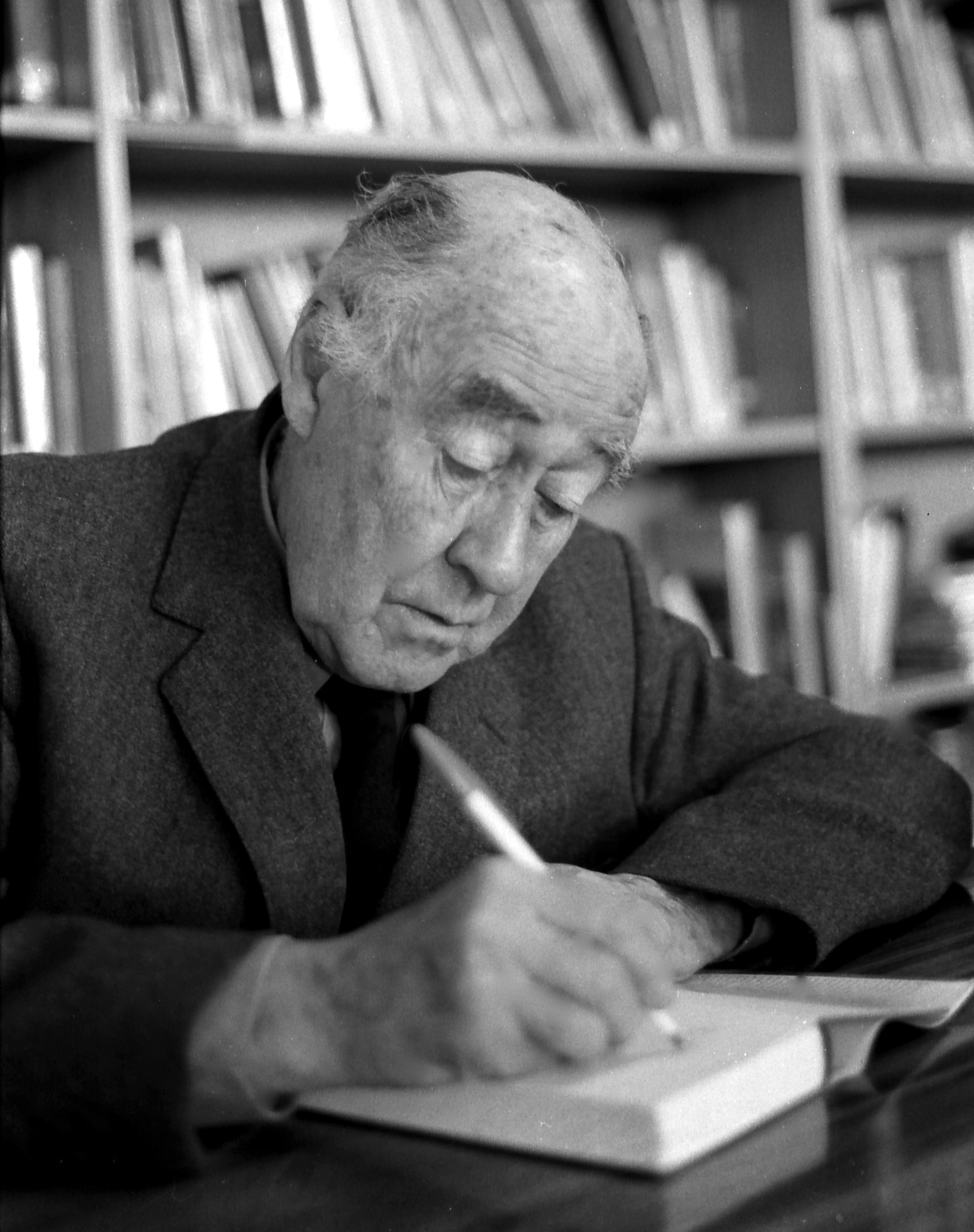
- Wall in 1990
- Born: August 28, 1908; Rathmines, Dublin, Ireland
- Died: May 19, 1997 (aged 88); Dún Laoghaire
- Education: Belvedere College; National University of Ireland (B.A.)
- Occupations: Civil servant, writer
- Spouse: Fanny Feehan
- Writing career
- Notable work: The Unfortunate Fursey (1946)

Mervyn Wall (28 August 1908 – 19 May 1997) was an Irish writer and public servant, best known for two satirical fantasy novels about a monk named Fursey.

== Life ==
Wall was born in Rathmines, Dublin. He attended Belvedere College as well as school in Bonn, Germany, and completed a B.A. degree with the National University of Ireland in 1928.

He worked in the public service from 1934 to 1975: as a civil servant from 1934 to 1948; for Radio Éireann from 1948 to 1957; and as Secretary of the Arts Council from 1957 to 1975.

Wall died on 19 May 1997 in St. Michael's Hospital, Dún Laoghaire. His wife, music critic Fanny Feehan, died eight months previously.

== Career ==
Wall published novels, short stories and plays, and wrote for a short-lived literary magazine, Ireland Today.

He wrote two humorous fantasy novels, The Unfortunate Fursey and The Return of Fursey, about the misadventures of a monk in Ireland in a fantastical version of the 10th century. The Fursey novels have been highly praised in North America. E. F. Bleiler in The Guide to Supernatural Fiction described The Unfortunate Fursey as "a landmark book in the history of fantasy". Darrell Schweitzer described Wall as "one of the finest comic fantasists ever, but also one of the most neglected." Parke Godwin described both Fursey novels as "pure gold".

He won an award, the Best European Novel award, for Leaves for the Burning.

== Writings ==
=== Novels ===
- The Unfortunate Fursey, 1946
- The Return of Fursey, 1948
- Leaves for the Burning, 1952
- No Trophies Raise, 1956
- Hermitage, 1982
- The Garden of Echoes, 1982

=== Plays ===
- Alarm among the Clerks, 1940
- The Lady in the Twilight, 1971

=== Other publications ===
- A Flutter of Wings, 1974, short stories
- Forty Foot Gentlemen Only, 1963, history
