= Fantasy Faction =

Fantasy-Faction
- Website type: Fantasy book reviews and news site
- Available in: English
- Creator: Marc Aplin
- Editor: Jennie Ivins
- Website: fantasy-faction.com
- Commercial: No
- Registration: No
- Launched: October 2010; 15 years ago
- Current status: Active

Fantasy-Faction is a website and community for fans of fantasy fiction. They share news, reviews and interviews about books in the fantasy, science fiction, horror, and other speculative fiction genres. It was founded by Marc Aplin and has won or been nominated for genre awards including:

- British Fantasy Award Nomination – 2013, 2014, & 2016
- World Fantasy Award Nomination – 2014
