= Delyth Badder =

Welsh folklorist, writer and pathologist

- Born: Lwynhudol near Pwllheli, Gwynedd, Wales
- Education: Ysgol Feddygaeth Prifysgol Caerdydd
- Employer: National Health Service
- Organization: British Association of Paediatric Surgeons
- Notable work: The Folklore of Wales: Ghosts (2023)

Delyth Badder is a Welsh folklorist, writer and antiquarian book collector. She co-wrote The Folklore of Wales: Ghosts (2023) with fellow folklorist Mark Norman. She is also a medical examiner, National Health Service consultant and the world's first Welsh-speaking consultant paediatric and perinatal pathologist.

== Biography ==
Badder was born in Llwyn-hudol near Pwllheli, Gwynedd, Wales.

=== Medical career ===
Badder studied at the Ysgol Feddygaeth Prifysgol Caerdydd (Cardiff University School of Medicine). She is the world's first Welsh-speaking consultant paediatric and perinatal pathologist, working for the National Health Service (NHS) in Pontypridd, Wales. She is a Medical examiner for the Welsh Medical Examiner's Office. She works part-time to divide time between pathology and folklore.

=== Folklore ===
Badder is a Welsh folklorist with special interest in Welsh death omens, apparitions and the nineteenth-century neo-druidic movement in Pontypridd. She is an Honorary Research Fellow with Amgueddfa Cymru (National Museum of Wales). She is studying a masters degree in the field at Cardiff University.

Badder co-wrote The Folklore of Wales: Ghosts (2023) with fellow folklorist Mark Norman, curator of the Folklore Library and Archive in Devon, England. The book recounts historic folkloric beliefs about ghosts in the Welsh landscape, such belief in the Tylwyth Teg (fairy folk), holy ghosts, spectral white ladies and water spirits. Rare Welsh folk stories were collected in their original Welsh language versions from manuscripts, with several printed and translated into English for the first time. Famous ghosts are also included in the book, like Gwynedd's Cadi’r Forwyn (Cadi the Maid), the Bwci Melyn Bach y Cwm (The Little Yellow Bogey of the Valley), the soldier Owain Lawgoch, whose ghost was supposedly captured in a bottle then flung into the deep of the River Dulas in Ceredigion, Wales, and Arawn (king of the otherworld realm of Annwn in Welsh mythology)

Badder is a regular contributor to discussions on Welsh folklore in the media. She has been invited onto Welsh national radio to discuss Welsh folklore, tell traditional ghost stories at Halloween, share old Welsh rituals and traditions of the Christmas season, cover how birds are presented within Welsh folklore and legend, and to discuss the life and work of the "eccentric" Welsh Archdruid, physician and political activist William Price. She had been a guest on podcasts and the Fabulous Folklore Presents on YouTube. She has delivered talks at Welsh language-events, including a talk on "Charms and Magical Powers of the Welsh Common Folk" at Bangor University in Bangor, Wales.

=== Personal life ===
Badder is married to Welsh children's author Elidir Jones. She plays the harp and the piano.
