= Wormwood (magazine) =

Fantasy literature magazine

Wormwood: Writings about fantasy, supernatural and decadent literature was a magazine of literature and literary criticism, edited by Mark Valentine, and published semi-annually since 2003 by Tartarus Press. The first issue appeared in August 2003.

As the subtitle indicates, the magazine focused on fantasy and decadence, and especially on European authors of the past two centuries. Most of the selections were criticism articles or book reviews, although some previously unpublished fiction appeared in latter issues. Issues 1-14 featured a column titled "The Decadent World-View" by Brian Stableford, analyzing texts which provided particular influence on the French Decadents, particularly Charles Baudelaire.

== See also ==
- List of literary magazines
