= Richard Dalby =

British book editor (1949–2017)

Richard Dalby

Richard Lawrence Dalby (15 April 1949 – 4 May 2017) was an editor and literary researcher noted for his anthologies of ghost stories.

== Early life ==
Richard Dalby was born in London on 15 April 1949 to Tom, a publishing editor, and Nancy, an amateur artist. He was educated at Haberdashers' Aske's School from the age of 7 when he also began to take an interest in supernatural fiction. He was diagnosed with diabetes at the age of 16. He did not attend university.

== Career ==
Dalby's early career was spent as a bookseller in bookshops, including Foyles in London, and he later sold books by mail order, issuing catalogues from his home in Scarborough, Yorkshire.

In the 1970s he began to produce anthologies of ghost stories and supernatural tales, compiling The Sorceress in Stained Glass and Other Ghost Stories in 1971 and over 50 other anthologies and collections. He unearthed rare and forgotten works and promoted the work of authors he loved, whether antiquarian or contemporary, such as H. Russell Wakefield and L. A. Lewis (1899–1961). In 1993 he founded the Ghost Story Press with David Tibet, which published 14 volumes.

Dalby was described by The Times as the "unofficial deputy editor" for the journal Book and Magazine Collector, writing over 200 articles for the magazine.

He owned a set of H. Rider Haggard first editions and a copy of Bram Stoker's Dracula with the author's annotations. His book collection was so extensive that he rented a storage unit to help house it.

== Death ==
Dalby died of diabetic ketoacidosis on 4 May 2017. He lived with his parents until their deaths and never married.

== Select bibliography ==
The first edition of each title is listed below

=== Anthologies ===
- The Sorceress in Stained Glass and Other Ghost Stories (London: Tom Stacy, 1971).
- The Best Ghost Stories of H. Russell Wakefield (London: John Murray, 1978).
- Dracula's Brood (Wellingborough: Crucible, 1987).
- Ghosts and Scholars (Wellingborough: Crucible, 1987).
- The Virago Book of Ghost Stories: The Twentieth Century, Volume One (London: Virago, 1987).
- The Virago Book of Ghost Stories (London: Virago, 1988).
- Ghosts for Christmas (London: O'Mara, 1988.
- Chillers for Christmas (London: O'Mara, 1989).
- Mystery for Christmas (London: O'Mara, 1990).
- The Mammoth Book of Ghost Stories (London: Robinson, 1990).
- The Mammoth Book of Ghost Stories 2 (New York: Carroll & Graf, 1991).
- The Virago Book of Ghost Stories: The Twentieth Century: Volume Two (London: Virago, 1991)
- Crime for Christmas (London: O'Mara, 1991).
- Tales of Witchcraft (London: O'Mara, 1991).
- The Collected Ghost Stories of E. F. Benson (New York: Carroll & Graf, 1992).
- Vampire Stories (London: Michael O'Mara, 1992).
- Horror for Christmas (London: Michael O'Mara, 1992).
- Shivers for Christmas (London: Michael O'Mara, 1995).
- The Mammoth Book of Victorian and Edwardian Ghost Stories (London: Robinson, 1995).
- Bram Stoker, Best Ghost and Horror Stories (London: Mineola, NY: Dover Publications, 1997). Joint editors: Stefan Dziemianowicz and S. T. Joshi.
- Twelve Gothic Tales (Wellingborough: Crucible, 1998).

=== Nonfiction ===
- Bram Stoker: A Bibliography of First Editions (London: Dracula Press, 1983)
- The Golden Age of Children's Book Illustrations (London: Michael O'Mara, 1991).
