= Rosalie Parker =

Rosalie Parker is an author, scriptwriter and editor who runs the Tartarus Press with R. B. Russell.

Parker jointly won the World Fantasy Award "Special Award: Non-Professional" for publishing in 2002, 2004 and 2012. The Horror Writers Association gave Parker and Russell the "Excellence in Speciality Press Publishing" award for 2009.

Her anthology, Strange Tales, won the 2004 World Fantasy Award for Best Anthology.

Parker's first collection of short stories, The Old Knowledge, was published in 2010. Her short story "In the Garden" was selected by Stephen Jones for The Mammoth Book of Best New Horror 21 (Robinson Publishing, 2010). "Random Flight" was included in Best British Horror 2015. Her second collection, Damage was longlisted for the 2016 Edge Hill Short Story Prize. Parker's short fiction has been described by Michael Dirda in The Washington Post as "excellent".

Parker is co-director/producer of Robert Aickman: Author of Strange Tales, released May 2015, and Coverdale: A Year in the Life, released February 2016.

== Literary work ==
Short Story Collections by Parker

- The Old Knowledge and Other Stories, Swan River Press (Dublin), 2010. Reprinted 2012
- Damage, PS Publishing (Hornsea, East Yorkshire), 2016
- Sparks from the Fire, Swan River Press (Dublin), 2018.
- Through the Storm, PS Publishing (Hornsea, East Yorkshire), 2020
- Dream Fox and Other Strange Stories, Tartarus Press (Carlton, Coverdale, North Yorkshire), 2023

Short Stories written by Parker

- "Spirit Solutions", The Black Veil & Other Tales of Supernatural Sleuths, Wordsworth Editions, 2008
- "In the Garden", The Fifth Black Book of Horror, Mortbury Press, 2009. Reprinted The Mammoth Book of Best New Horror 21 (Robinson Publishing, 2010)
- "Oracle", Dark World, Tartarus Press, 2013
- "The Nurse’s Letter: An Addendum to 'The White People'", Faunus 27, The Friends of Arthur Machen, 2013
- "The Thames", Terror Tales of London, Gray Friar Press, 2013
- "Untouchable", The Horror Fields, Morpheus Tales, 2014
- "Random Flight", Terror Tales of Yorkshire, Gray Friar Press, 2014
- "Selkie: A Scottish Idyll", Supernatural Tales 29, 2015
- "Homecraft", Uncertainties, Volume II, Swan River Press, 2016
- "The Bronze Statuette", Supernatural Tales 33, 2016
- "The Attempt", Shadows and Tall Trees 7, 2017
- "The Dreaming", Black Static # 59, 2017
- "Waiting", The Book of the Sea, Egaeus Press, 2018
- "Chimera", Great British Horror 3: For Those in Peril, Black Shuck Books, 2018
- "The Moor", Supernatural Tales, 39, November 2018
- "The Decision", Supernatural Tales 45, Winter 2020/21
- "Holiday Reading", Best New Horror 30, Winter 2020
- "Home Comforts", Infra Noir 2020, Zagava Books, 2021
- "Homecoming", Dreamland: Other Stories, Black Shuck Books, 2021
- "Madre de Dios", Raphus Press, 2021
- "Dream Fox", They're Out to Get You, TK Pulp, 2021
- "All Talk", Supernatural Tales 49, 2022
- "Aircrew", Grotequeries, Zagava, 2022
- "Bipolarity", Grotequeries, Zagava, 2022
- "The Walled Garden: A Fable", Fabulous Aesop, Zagava, 2022

Works edited by Parker

- Tales from Tartarus, edited with R. B. Russell, Tartarus Press, 1995
- Ghost Stories, by Oliver Onions Tartarus Press, 2000
- Dromenon, The Best Weird Stories, by Gerald Heard, Tartarus Press, 2001
- The Collected Macabre Stories, by L.P. Hartley, Tartarus Press, 2001
- Various Temptations, by William Sansom, Tartarus Press, 2002
- Strange Tales I, Tartarus Press, 2003
- Tarnhelm, The Best Supernatural Stories, by Hugh Walpole, Tartarus Press, 2003
- The Suicide Club and Other Dark Adventures, by Robert Louis Stevenson, Tartarus Press, 2004
- Father Raven and Other Tales, by A. E. Coppard, Tartarus Press, 2006
- The Sense of the Past, by Henry James, Tartarus Press, 2006
- The Man Who Could Work Miracles, by H. G. Wells, Tartarus Press, 2006
- Strangers and Pilgrims, by Walter de la Mare, Tartarus Press, 2007
- Strange Tales II, Tartarus Press, 2007
- The Triumph of Night and Other Tales, by Edith Wharton, Tartarus Press, 2008
- Sredni Vashtar, by Saki, Tartarus Press, 2008
- The Sandman and Other Night Pieces, by E. T. A. Hoffmann, Tartarus Press, 2008
- An Occurrence at Owl Creek Bridge and Other Stories, by Ambrose Bierce, Tartarus Press, 2008
- The Snow-Image and Other Stories of the Supernatural, by Nathaniel Hawthorne, Tartarus Press, 2008
- The Legend of Sleepy Hollow and Other Stories, by Washington Irving, Tartarus Press, 2009
- Strange Tales III, Tartarus Press, 2009
- Nightmare Touch, by Lafcadio Hearn, Tartarus Press, 2010
- Clarimonde and Other Stories, by Theophile Gautier, Tartarus Press, 2011
- Strange Tales IV, Tartarus Press, 2014
- Strange Tales V, Tartarus Press, 2015
- Green Thoughts, by John Collier, Tartarus Press, 2016

Articles Contributed to Magazines

- Aleister Crowley, Book and Magazine Collector 297, August 2008
- Margaret Atwood, Book and Magazine Collector 302, Christmas 2008
- Harry Crosby, Book and Magazine Collector 305, March 2009
- Alastair, Book and Magazine Collector 309, July 2009
- Count Stenbock, Book and Magazine Collector 317, February 2010
- A.E. Waite, Book and Magazine Collector 322, July 2010
- Edith Wharton, Book and Magazine Collector 323, August 2010

== Film/video ==
- Coverdale: A Year in the Life, 2016 (co-director/producer)
- Robert Aickman: Author of Strange Tales, 2015 (co-director/producer)
- Intrusions: Looking After Aickman, 2014 (co-director/producer)
- Current 93: Live at Halifax Minster, 2014 (co-director/producer)
