= Mark Valentine =

English short story and essayist

Mark Valentine (born 1959) is an English short story author, editor and essayist on book-collecting.

== Works ==
=== Short stories ===
Valentine's short stories have been published in a number of collections and in anthologies. The Collected Connoisseur (Tartarus Press, 2010) is about the mystical encounters of an aesthete whose real name is never revealed, some written jointly with John Howard. ‘The Descent of the Fire’, a story in this series by Valentine & Howard, was included in the 2004 World Fantasy Award winning anthology Strange Tales edited by Rosalie Parker. Herald of the Hidden (Tartarus Press, 2013) collects stories about Ralph Tyler, a Northamptonshire folklorist.

Other short story collections include Selected Stories (2012) and Seventeen Stories (2013). His story ‘Vain Shadows Flee’ was chosen for Best British Short Stories 2016 edited by Nicholas Royle (Salt Publishing). Secret Europe (2012) and Inner Europe (2018) are shared collections with John Howard of stories set in real and fictional European locations.

=== Studies and essays ===
He has written studies of Arthur Machen and Sarban. He also wrote numerous articles for Book and Magazine Collector, and his essays on book-collecting, minor writers and related subjects have been collected in Haunted By Books (2015) and A Country Still All Mystery (2017).

=== As editor ===
Valentine has edited or introduced over forty books, mostly in the supernatural fiction field, including editions of work by Walter de la Mare, Robert Louis Stevenson, Saki, J. Meade Falkner and others. He has also edited anthologies, including The Werewolf Pack (Wordsworth, 2008), The Black Veil (Wordsworth, 2008) and The Scarlet Sin – Stories for Dorian Gray (The Swan River Press, Dublin, 2017).

From 1985 to 1988, he edited Source, a journal about ancient holy wells. He then co-edited (with Roger Dobson) Aklo, a journal of the fantastic, and edited Wormwood, a biannual journal of fantastic literature, from 2003 to 2022.

=== Publishing ===
In small press publishing, with Roger Dobson he ran Caermaen Books, principally devoted to titles about Arthur Machen and, with Jo Valentine, he has issued handmade artist books under the Valentine & Valentine imprint. Valentine also published the first book by Joel Lane, a chapbook titled The Foggy, Foggy, Dew.

=== Recordings ===
Valentine has also issued sound recordings. As The Mystic Umbrellas, he contributed "Journey to the West", a keyboard piece, to the Deleted Funtime tape (Deleted Records, Dec 009, 1980), and as Radio Dromedary contributed treated shortwave recordings to National Grid 2 (Conventional Tapes, CON 015, 1981). He also issued The Sound of the Sea/The Sound of Pendeen Watch, a sound recording of the sea and a Cornish lighthouse foghorn (Zennor Hill tapes, 1983).

=== Online writing ===
He is co-writer of the literary blog Wormwoodiana with Douglas A. Anderson, with occasional contributions from others.

== Books ==
=== Fiction ===
- In Violet Veils, Tartarus Press (Horam, Sussex), 1999
- Masques and Citadels, Tartarus Press (North Yorkshire), 2003
- The Rite of Trebizond and Other Tales, with John Howard, Ex Occidente Press (Bucharest, Romania), 2008
- The Nightfarers, Ex Occidente Press (Bucharest, Romania), 2009. Reprinted Tartarus Press (North Yorkshire), 2020
- The Seven Treasures of Bucharest, Ex Occidente Press (Bucharest, Romania), 2009
- The Collected Connoisseur, with John Howard, Tartarus Press (North Yorkshire), 2010
- The Mascarons of the Late Empire & Other Studies, Passport Levant (Bucharest, Romania), 2010
- The Peacock Escritoire, Passport Levant (Bucharest, Romania), 2011
- Secret Europe, with John Howard, Ex Occidente Press (Bucharest, Romania), 2012
- Selected Stories, Swan River Press (Dublin), 2012
- Herald of the Hidden & Other Stories, Tartarus Press (North Yorkshire), 2013
- Seventeen Stories, Swan River Press (Dublin), 2013
- The Uncertainty of All Earthly Things, Zagava (Germany), 2018
- Inner Europe, with John Howard, Tartarus Press (North Yorkshire), 2018
- Powers and Presences, with John Howard, Sarob Press (France), 2020
- The Fig Garden, Tartarus Press (North Yorkshire), 2022
- The Peacock Escritoire, Tartarus Press (North Yorkshire), 2023
- Lost Estates, Swan River Press (Ireland), 2024

=== Poetry ===
- At Dusk, Ex Occidente Press (Bucharest, Romania) 2012
- Star Kites: Poems & Versions, Tartarus Press (North Yorkshire), 2013
- Astarology, Salò Press (Norwich), 2021

=== Non Fiction ===
- Arthur Machen, Seren Books, 1985
- Time, a Falconer: A Study of Sarban, Tartarus Press (North Yorkshire), 2010
- Haunted by Books, Tartarus Press (North Yorkshire), 2015
- A Country Still All Mystery, Tartarus Press (North Yorkshire), 2017
- The Secret Ceremonies: Critical Essays on Arthur Machen (co-edited with Timothy J Jarvis), Hippocampus Press, 2019
- A Wild Tumultory Library, Tartarus Press (North Yorkshire), 2019
- Sphinxes and Obelisks, Tartarus Press (North Yorkshire), 2021
- The Thunderstorm Collectors, Tartarus Press (North Yorkshire), 2024
