= Joel Lane =

British writer (1963–2013)

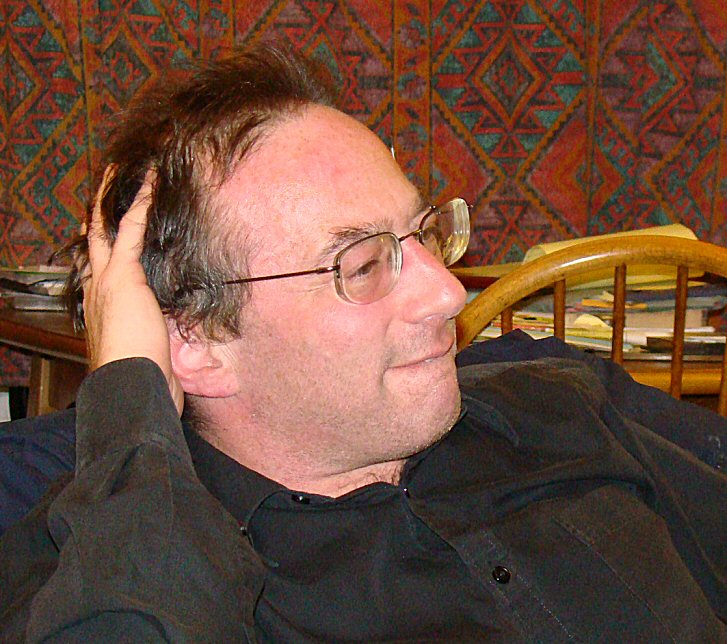
The writer and journalist Joel Lane.

Joel Lane (1963 – 26 November 2013) was a British novelist, short story writer, poet, critic and anthology editor. He received the World Fantasy Award in 2013 and the British Fantasy Award twice.

== Life ==
Born in Exeter, he was the nephew of tenor saxophonist Ronnie Scott.

He attended Cambridge University, where he was active in the undergraduate poetry circle that formed around the student poetry magazine Virtue Without Terror.

At the time of his death, Lane was living in south Birmingham, where he worked in health industry-related publishing. His location frequently provided settings for his fiction.

== Works ==
The majority of Lane's short stories can be categorised as horror or dark fantasy, and he cited Robert Aickman, Ramsey Campbell and M. John Harrison as influences on his fiction. His short stories were usually published in small-press books and magazines. Lane's work was also anthologized by both Karl Edward Wagner (in Wagner's The Year's Best Horror Stories series) and Stephen Jones (in Jones' Best New Horror series). Much of Lane's fiction is set in Birmingham and the Black Country. Lane's novels are more overtly mainstream. From Blue to Black (2000) is a portrait of a disturbed rock musician, whilst The Blue Mask (2003) follows the aftermath of a brutal and disfiguring attack.

Something Remains, edited by Peter Coleborn and Pauline E. Dungate (Alchemy Press, 2016), is a collection of stories by other hands "based on and inspired by the notes left by Joel Lane". This Spectacular Darkness, edited by Mark Valentine and John Howard (Tartarus Press, 2016), is a collection of his critical essays on fantasy and horror fiction, together with appreciations of his work.

== Guest appearances ==
Lane addressed the Birmingham Science Fiction Group in March 2002. Together with his friend Steve Green, he was a guest speaker at Microcon 30 at Exeter University in March 2010.

== Politics ==
Lane was described in an obituary as "a passionate supporter of equality and a tireless scourge of fascism", was strongly left wing and opposed to the politics advocated by Tony Blair and New Labour. He joined the Socialist Party in 2009 and contributed to its newspaper, The Socialist, and its journal, Socialism Today.

== Partial bibliography ==
=== Novels ===
- From Blue to Black (2000)
- The Blue Mask (2003)

=== Novella ===
- The Witnesses Are Gone (2009)

=== Short story collections ===
- The Earth Wire and Other Stories (1994)
- The Lost District and Other Stories (2006)
- The Terrible Changes (2009)
- Do Not Pass Go (booklet, 2011)
- Where Furnaces Burn (2012)
- Scar City (2015)
- The Anniversary of Never (2015)

=== Poetry ===
- The Edge of the Screen (1998)
- Trouble in the Heartland (2004)
- The Autumn Myth (2010)
- Instinct (pamphlet, 2012)

=== Anthologies edited ===
- Birmingham Noir: Urban Tales of Crime and Suspense (2002, co-edited with Steve Bishop)
- Beneath the Ground (2003)
- Never Again (2010, co-edited with Allyson Bird)

== Awards ==
- 1993: Eric Gregory Award (poetry)
- 1994: British Fantasy Award, best anthology / collection, The Earth Wire and Other Stories
- 2008: British Fantasy Award, best short story, My Stone Desire
- 2008: Shirley Jackson Award, novella finalist, The Witnesses are Gone
- 2013: World Fantasy Award, best collection, Where Furnaces Burn (PS Publishing, 2012)
