= Tartarus Press =

English independent book publisher

- Founded: 1990
- Country of origin: United Kingdom
- Headquarters location: Carlton, Coverdale, North Yorkshire
- Key people: R. B. Russell and Rosalie Parker
- Publication types: Books, journals
- Fiction genres: Fantasy
- Official website: www.tartaruspress.com

Tartarus Press is an independent book publisher in Coverdale in North Yorkshire, England.

== Background ==
Tartarus Press is run by R. B. Russell and Rosalie Parker. It publishes classic and contemporary works of supernatural and strange fiction. Tartarus classic authors include David Lindsay, Arthur Machen, Walter de la Mare, Oliver Onions and Edna W. Underwood, and more modern authors include Sarban and Robert Aickman. Contemporary writers include Andrew Michael Hurley, Nike Sulway, Rhys Hughes, Mark Valentine, Angela Slatter, Reggie Oliver, Mark Samuels and Joel Lane. A twice-yearly journal, Wormwood, was devoted to discussion of fantastic, supernatural and decadent literature but has now ceased publication.

Tartarus won the World Fantasy Award "Special Award: Non-Professional" for their publishing in 2002, 2004, 2012, and 2015; and Strange Tales, their anthology of new short fiction, won the 2004 World Fantasy Award for Best Anthology of the year. The Horror Writers Association gave Tartarus Press the "Excellence in Speciality Press Publishing" award for 2009.

Notable books published by Tartarus Press include The Bitterwood Bible by Angela Slatter which won the World Fantasy Award for best Collection, and The Loney by Andrew Michael Hurley which won the Costa award, First Novel. In 2025 Tartarus Press published, in association with the Bronte Society, the first edition of A Book of Ryhmes by Charlotte Brontë, with an Introduction by Patti Smith.

== See also ==
- Supernatural fiction
- Book collecting
