= British Fantasy Award for Best Short Fiction =

Annual literary award for speculative fiction

- Awarded for: Works under 15,000 words
- Country: United Kingdom
- Presented by: British Fantasy Society
- First award: 1973; 53 years ago
- Most recent winner: "Shadow Jack" by CL Hellisen
- Website: britishfantasysociety.org

The British Fantasy Award for Best Short Fiction is a literary award given annually as part of the British Fantasy Awards.

== History ==
Prior to 2008, this award was called the British Fantasy Award for Best Short Story.

== Winners and shortlists ==
* Winners

Year	Author	Work	Publisher or Publication	Ref.
1973	L. Sprague de Camp*	"The Fallible Fiend"	Signet	
1974	Michael Moorcock*	"The Jade Man's Eyes"	Flashing Swords #2	
1975	Karl Edward Wagner*	"Sticks"	Whispers, #3	
1975	John Jakes	"Ghoul's Garden"	Flashing Swords #2	
1975	Jack Vance	"The Seventeen Virgins"	F&SF, October 1974	
1976	Fritz Leiber*	"The Second Book of Fritz Leiber"	DAW Books	
1976	Karl Edward Wagner	"The Fourth Seal"	Whispers, #2	
1976	David Riley	"The Satyr's Head"	The Satyr's Head and Other Tales of Terror	
1976	Michael Moorcock	"White Stars"	New Worlds 8	
1977	Karl Edward Wagner*	"Two Suns Setting"	Fantastic, May 1976	
1977	Howard Waldrop	"Der Untergang des Abendlandesmenschen"	Chacal	
1977	Richard Cowper	"Piper at the Gates of Dawn"	F&SF, March 1976	
1978	Ramsey Campbell*	"In the Bag"	Cold Fear	
1978	Marvin Kaye	"The Flight of the Umbrella"	Fantastic Stories, June 1977	
1978	Parke Godwin	"The Lady of Finnigan's Hearth"	Fantastic Stories, September 1977	
1979	Harlan Ellison*	"Jeffty is Five"	F&SF, July 1977	
1979	J. Michael Reaves	"The Big Spell"	Weird Heroes Volume 8	
1979	Ramsey Campbell	"The Changer of Names"	Swords Against Darkness III	
1979	Stephen R. Donaldson	"The Lady in White"	F&SF, February 1978	
1980	Fritz Leiber*	"The Button Molder"	Whispers, #13/14	
1980	Adrian Cole	"First Make Them Mad"	Fantasy Tales, #4	
1980	Tanith Lee	"Red as Blood"	F&SF, July 1979	
1981	Robert Aickman*	"The Stains"	New Terrors 1	
1981	Stephen King	"Crouch End"	New Tales of the Cthulhu Mythos	
1981	Brian Lumley	"The House of the Temple"	Kadath, #3	
1981	Dennis Etchison	"The Late Shift"	Dark Forces	
1982	Dennis Etchison*	"The Dark Country"	Fantasy Tales. #8	
1982	Michael Moorcock	"Elric at the End of Time"	Elsewhere 1	
1982	Stephen King	"The Monkey"	Gallery, November 1981	
1982	Ramsey Campbell	"Through the Walls"	British Fantasy Society Booklet, #5	
1983	Stephen King*	"The Breathing Method"	Different Seasons	
1983	Stephen King	"Apt Pupil"	Different Seasons	
1983	Brian Lumley	"Name and Number"	Kadath, July 1982	
1984	Karl Edward Wagner*	"Neither Brute Nor Human"	World Fantasy Con Programme Booklet	
1985	Clive Barker*	"In the Hills, the Cities"	Books of Blood, Volume I	
1986	Clive Barker*	"The Forbidden"	Fantasy Tales, #14	
1987	Dennis Etchison*	"The Olympic Runner"	Fantasy Tales, #16	
1988	Steve Rasnic Tem*	"Leaks"	Whispers VI	
1989	Brian Lumley*	"Fruiting Bodies"	Weird Tales, Summer 1988	
1990	Joe R. Lansdale*	"On the Far Side of the Cadillac Desert With Dead Folks"	Book of the Dead	
1991	Michael Marshall Smith*	"The Man Who Drew Cats"	Dark Voices 2	
1992	Michael Marshall Smith*	"The Dark Lands"	Darklands	
1992	Jack Pavey	"The Boo-Hoo Forest"	Peeping Tom, #4	
1992	David B. Silva	"Slipping"	Borderlands 2	
1993	Nicholas Royle*	"Night Shift Sister"	In Dreams	
1994	Dennis Etchison*	"The Dog Park"	Dark Voices 5	
1995	Paul J. McAuley*	"The Temptation of Dr. Stein"	The Mammoth Book of Frankenstein	
1995	Kim Newman	"Out of the Night, When the Full Moon Is Bright..."	The Mammoth Book of Werewolves	
1995	Michael Marshall Smith	"To Receive is Better"	The Mammoth Book of Frankenstein	
1996	Michael Marshall Smith*	"More Tomorrow"	Dark Terrors	
1996	Simon Clark	"Annabelle Says"	British Fantasy Society Booklet #20	
1996	Stephen Laws	"Annabelle Says"	British Fantasy Society Booklet #20	
1996	John Grant	"The Glad Who Sang a Mermaid in from the Probability Sea"	Interzone, #95	
1996	Karl Edward Wagner	"I've Come to Talk with You Again"	Dark Terrors	
1996	Martin Simpson	"Last Rites and Resurrections"	The Third Alternative, #8	
1997	Martin Simpson*	"Dancing About Architecture"	The Third Alternative, #11	
1997	Justina Robson	"The Bull Leapers"	Visionary Tongue, #4	
1997	Kim Newman	"Citizen Ed"	Interzone, #113	
1997	Eugene Byrne	"Citizen Ed"	Interzone, #113	
1997	Michael Marshall Smith	"Foreign Bodies"	Lethal Kisses	
1997	Michael Marshall Smith	"Hell Hath Enlarged Herself"	Dark Terrors 2	
1997	Thomas Ligotti	"The Red Tower"	The Nightmare Factory	
1997	Jack Wainer	"Scars"	Grue, #18	
1997	Thomas Ligotti	"Teatro Grottesco"	The Nightmare Factory	
1998	Christopher Fowler*	"Wageslaves"	Destination Unknown; Secret City: Strange Tales of London	
1998	Peter Crowther	"Even Beggars Would Ride"	The Third Alternative, #13	
1998	James Lovegrove	"Even Beggars Would Ride"	The Third Alternative, #13	
1998	Geoff Ryman	"Family"	Interzone, #127	
1998	Terry Lamsley	"The Lost Boy Found"	Dark Terrors 3	
1998	Ramsey Campbell	"The Word"	Millennium	
1999	Stephen Laws*	"The Song My Sister Sang"	Scaremongers 2: Redbrick Eden	
1999	Nicholas Royle	"The Blue Posts"	The Third Alternative, #18	
1999	Charles de Lint	"China Dolls"	The Crow: Shattered Lives & Broken Dreams	
1999	Tanith Lee	"Jedella Ghost"	Interzone, #135	
1999	Jason Gould	"Kiss Me with your Jackal Lips"	The Third Alternative, #15	
1999	Graham Masterton	"Lolicia"	Manitou Man: The Worlds of Graham Masterton	
1999	Ramsey Campbell	"Nevere to be Heard"	Dark Terrors 4	
1999	Mike Chinn	"Song of the Dawn"	The Paladin Mandates	
2000	Tim Lebbon*	"White"	Masters of Terror Press	
2000	Ramsey Campbell	"The Entertainment"	999: New Stories of Horror and Suspense	
2000	Peter Crowther	"The Hand that Feeds"	Enigmatic Press	
2000	James Lovegrove	"The Hand that Feeds"	Enigmatic Press	
2000	Graham Joyce	"Leningrad Nights"	PS Publishing	
2000	Tanith Lee	"Where Does the Town Go at Night?"	Interzone, #147	
2001	Tim Lebbon*	"Naming of Parts"	PS Publishing	
2001	Michael Marshall Smith	"The Handover"	Dark Terrors 5	
2001	Ramsey Campbell	"No Story in It"	Dark Terrors 5	
2001	Stan Nicholls	"The Taking"	Swords Against the Millennium	
2001	Steve Lockley	"The Winter Hunt"	F20: One	
2001	Paul Lewis	"The Winter Hunt"	F20: One	
2002	Simon Clark*	"Goblin City Lights"	Urban Gothic: Lacuna and Other Trips	
2002	Graham Joyce	"Black Dust"	Subterranean Press	
2002	Alastair Reynolds	"Diamond Dogs"	PS Publishing	
2002	Conrad Williams	"Nearly People"	PS Publishing	
2002	Steve Lockley	"Telling the Tale"	Urban Gothic: Lacuna and Other Trips	
2002	Paul Lewis	"Telling the Tale"	Urban Gothic: Lacuna and Other Trips	
2003	Mark Chadbourn*	"The Fairy Feller's Master Stroke"	PS Publishing	
2003	Paul Finch	"Cape Wrath"	Telos	
2003	Michael Moorcock	"Firing the Cathedral"	PS Publishing	
2003	Andrew Humphrey	"Open the Box"	The Third Alternative, #29	
2003	China Miéville	"The Tain"	PS Publishing	
2004	Christopher Fowler*	"American Waitress"	Crimewave 7: The Last Sunset	
2004	Simon Clark	"Exorcising Angels"	Exorcising Angels	
2004	Tim Lebbon	"Exorcising Angels"	Exorcising Angels	
2004	Ramsey Campbell	"Fear the Dead"	The Fear Within	
2004	Mark Samuels	"The White Hands"	The White Hands and Other Weird Tales	
2004	Mark Chadbourn	"Wonderland"	Telos	
2005	Paul Meloy*	"Black Static"	The Third Alternative, #40	
2005	Joe Hill	"The Black Phone"	The Third Alternative, #39	
2005	Neil Gaiman	"The Problem of Susan"	Flights: Extreme Visions of Fantasy	
2005	Adam Roberts	"Roads Were Burning"	Postscripts, #1	
2005	Joe Hill	"You Will Hear the Locust Sing"	The Third Alternative, #37	
2006	Joe Hill*	"Best New Horror"	Postscripts, #3	
2006	John Lucas	"Approaching Zero"	The Elastic Book of Numbers	
2006	Marie O'Regan	"Can You See Me?"	Midnight Street, #5	
2006	Paul Kane	"Homeland"	Assembly of Rogues	
2006	Ramsey Campbell	"Just Behind You"	Poe's Progeny	
2006	Sean Wright	"The Numberist"	New Wave of Speculative Fiction	
2006	Will McIntosh	"Soft Apocalypse"	Interzone, #200	
2007	Mark Chadbourn*	"Whisper Lane"	BFS: A Celebration	
2007	Stephen Volk	"31/10"	Dark Corners	
2007	Sarah Singleton	"The Disappeared"	Time Pieces	
2007	Marion Arnott	"The Little Drummer Boy"	Extended Play: The Elastic Book of Music	
2007	Steve Lockley	"Puca Muc"	Shrouded by Darkness	
2007	Paul Lewis	"Puca Muc"	Shrouded by Darkness	
2007	Conrad Williams	"The Veteran"	Postscripts, #6	
2008	Joel Lane*	"My Stone Desire"	Black Static, #1	
2008	Ramsey Campbell	"Digging Deep"	Phobic: Modern Horror Stories	
2008	Tim Lebbon	"Discovering Ghosts"	Postscripts, #10	
2008	Christopher Fowler	"The Spider Kiss"	The Mammoth Book of Monsters	
2008	Joe Hill	"Thumbprint"	Postscripts, #10	
2009	Sarah Pinborough*	"Do You See"	Myth-Understandings	
2009	Paul Maloy	"All Mouth"	Black Static, #6	
2009	Stephen King	"N."	Just After Sunset	
2009	Simon Strantzas	"Pinholes in Black Muslin"	The Second Humdrumming Book of Horror	
2009	Allyson Bird	"The Caul Bearer"	Bull Running for Girls	
2009	John Travis	"The Tobacconist's Concession"	The Second Humdrumming Book of Horror	
2009	Paul Meloy	"The Vague"	Islington Crocodiles	
2009	Joel Lane	"Winter Journey"	Black Static, #5	
2010	Michael Marshall Smith*	"What Happens When You Wake Up in the Night"	Nightjar	
2010	Nina Allan	"My Brother's Keeper"	Black Static, #12	
2010	Justin Carroll	"Careful What You Wish For"	Dragontales: Short Stories of Flame, Tooth and Scale	
2010	Sarah Pinborough	"The Confessor's Tale"	Hellbound Hearts	
2010	Rob Shearman	"George Clooney's Moustache"	The BFS Yearbook 2009	
2011	Sam Stone*	"Fool's Gold"	The Bitten Word	
2011	R. B. Russell	"The Beautiful Room"	Nightjar	
2011	Nicholas Royle	"The Lure"	The End of the Line	
2011	Jan Edwards	"Otterburn"	Estronomicon, December 2010	
2011	Joe Essid	"Something for Nothing"	Catastrophia	
2012	Angela Slatter*	"The Coffin-Maker's Daughter"	A Book of Horrors	
2012	Simon Bestwick	"Dermot"	Black Static, August-September 2011	
2012	Paul Finch	"King Death"	Spectral	
2012	Michael Marshall Smith	"Sad, Dark Thing"	A Book of Horrors	
2012	Adam Nevill	"Florrie"	House of Fear	
2013	Ray Cluley*	"Shark! Shark!"	Black Static, #29	
2013	Nina Allan	"Sunshine"	Black Static, #29	
2013	Ralph Robert Moore	"Our Island"	Where Are We Going?	
2013	Sam Sykes	"Wish for a Gun"	A Town Called Pandemonium	
2014	Carole Johnstone*	"Signs of the Times"	Black Static, #33	
2014	Pat Cadigan	"Chalk"	This is Horror	
2014	Sophia McDougall	"Golden Apple"	The Lowest Heaven	
2014	Thana Niveau	"Death Walks En Pointe"	The Burning Circus	
2014	Adrian Tchaikovsky	"Family Business"	The Alchemy Press Book of Urban Mythic	
2014	Karin Tidbeck	"Moonstruck"	Shadows & Tall Trees, #5	
2014	Conrad Williams	"The Fox"	This is Horror	
2015	Emma Newman*	"A Woman's Place"	Two Hundred and Twenty-One Baker Streets	
2015	J. A. Mains	"The Girl on the Suicide Bridge"	Beside the Seaside	
2015	Laura Mauro	"Ptichka"	Horror Uncut: Tales of Social Insecurity and Economic Unease	
2015	Gaie Sebold	"A Change of Heart"	Wicked Women	
2016	Priya Sharma*	"Fabulous Beasts"	Tor.com, July 2015	
2016	Cate Gardner	"When the Moon Man Knocks"	Black Static, October-November 2015	
2016	Frances Kay	"Strange Creation"	Tenebris Nyxies	
2016	V. H. Leslie	"The Blue Room"	Skein and Bone	
2016	Ralph Robert Moore	"Dirt Land"	Black Static, November-December 2015	
2016	Adam Nevill	"Hippocampus"	Terror Tales of the Ocean	
2017	Georgina Bruce*	"White Rabbit"	Black Static, January-February 2016	
2017	Simon Avery	"Charmed Life"	Something Remains: Joel Lane and Friends	
2017	Gary Budden	"Greenteeth"	Black Static, January-February 2016	
2017	Sammy HK Smith	"The Watcher"	The Book of Angels	
2017	Camilla Grudova	"Waxy"	Granta	
2017	Nadine West	"The Women's Song"	—	
2018	Laura Mauro*	"Looking for Laika"	Interzone #273	
2018	Ruth EJ Booth	"The Anniversary"	Black Static #61	
2018	Nina Allan	"Four Abstracts"	New Fears	
2018	Joanne Hall	"Illumination"	Book of Dragons	
2018	Stephen Volk	"The Little Gift"	PS Publishing	
2018	Stephen Gallagher	"Shepherd's Business"	New Fears	
2019	G. V. Anderson*	"Down Where Sound Comes Blunt"	F&SF, March-April 2018	
2019	Georgina Bruce	"Her Blood the Apples, Her Bones the Trees"	The Silent Garden	
2019	Carole Johnstone	"In the Gallery of Silent Screams"	Black Static, September-October 2018	
2019	Chris Kelso	"In the Gallery of Silent Screams"	Black Static, September-October 2018	
2019	Priya Sharma	"A Son of the Sea"	All the Fabulous Beasts	
2019	Ruth EJ Booth	"Telling Stories"	The Dark, December 2018	
2019	Robert Shearman	"Thumbsucker"	New Fears 2	
2020	Laura Mauro*	"The Pain-Eater's Daughter"	Undertow	
2020	Penny Jones	"Dendrochronology"	Hersham Horror	
2020	Robert Shearman	"I Say (I Say, I Say)"	The Shadow Booth	
2020	Julie Travis	"Tomorrow, when I Was Young"	Eibonvale Press	
2021	Ida Keogh*	"Infinite Tea in the Demara Café"	London Centric: Tales of Future London	
2021	Pete Sutton	"We Do Like to be Beside"	Alchemy Press Book of Horrors 2	
2021	Anna Taborska	"Daylight Robbery"	Bloody Britain	
2021	John Wiswell	"8-Bit Free Will"	PodCastle, November 24, 2020	
2022	Lorraine Wilson*	"Bathymetry"	Strange Horizons, March 2021	
2022	T. H. Dray	"Henrietta"	BFS Horizons	
2022	Oghenechovwe Donald Ekpeki	"O2 Arena"	Galaxy's Edge, November 2021	
2022	E. M. Faulds	"A Flight of Birds"	Shoreline of Infinity, August 2021	
2022	Julie Travis	"Sky Eyes"	Dreamland: Other Stories	
2022	C. A. Yates	"Fill the Thickened Lung with Breath"	Dreamland: Other Stories	
2023	James Bennett*	"Morta"	The Book of Queer Saints	
2023	Eliza Chan	"The Tails That Make You"	Fantasy, August 2022	
2023	Shona Kinsella	"The Call of El Tunche"	Weird Horror Anthology	
2023	Neil Williamson	"A Moment of Zugzwang"	ParSec #4	
2024	Tim Major*	"The Brazen Head of Westinghouse"	IZ Digital, May 2023	
2024	Shona Kinsella	"Professor Flotsam’s Cabinet of Peculiarities"	Great British Horror 8	
2024	Rachel Rener	"The Pilfered Quill"	From the Arcane	
2024	David Green	"The Pilfered Quill"	From the Arcane	
2024	C. A. Yates	"The Ripe Fruit in the Garden"	Great British Horror 8	
2024	C. A. Yates	"Turn Again, O My Sweetness"	At the Lighthouse	
2025	Eugenia Triantafyllou*	"Loneliness Universe"	Uncanny Magazine, May-June 2024	
2025	Tiffani Angus	"The Oracle at Dairy"	Trembling with Fear, September 2024	
2025	CL Hellisen	"Godskin"	Strange Horizons, March 2024	
2025	Priya Sharma	"The Witch’s Pillowbook"	Bound in Blood	
2025	Carlie St. George	"Jinx"	PseudoPod, February 2024	
2026	CL Hellisen*	"Shadow Jack"	Giganotosaurus	
2026	E M Faulds	"Godzilla As A Young Man Named Mike"	PodCastle	
2026	LJ McMenemy	"No One Knows the Old Ways Anymore and It Will Be The End of Everything"	Hiding Under the Leaves anthology; The Slab Press	
2026	James Bennett	"Down Street"	Blood in the Bricks anthology; NewCon Press	
