= British Fantasy Award for Best Magazine/Periodical =

British literary award

- Awarded for: Magazines and periodicals. May be awarded for fiction or nonfiction; print or online format
- Country: United Kingdom
- Presented by: British Fantasy Society
- First award: 2009; 17 years ago
- Most recent winner: Remains
- Website: britishfantasysociety.org

The British Fantasy Award for Best Magazine/Periodical is a literary award given annually as part of the British Fantasy Awards.

== Winners and shortlists ==
* Winners

Year	Work	Editor (if applicable)	Ref.
2009	Postscripts*	Peter Crowther	
2009	Postscripts*	Nick Gevers	
2009	Black Static	Andy Cox	
2009	Interzone	Andy Cox et al.	
2009	Midnight Street	Trevor Denyer	
2009	SFX	Dave Bradley	
2010	Murky Depths*	Terry Martin	
2010	Black Static	Andy Cox	
2010	Cemetery Dance	Richard Chizmar	
2010	Interzone	Andy Cox	
2010	Midnight Street	Trevor Denyer	
2010	Theaker's Quarterly Fiction	Stephen Theaker	
2010	Theaker's Quarterly Fiction	John Greenwood	
2011	Black Static*		
2011	Cemetery Dance		
2011	Murky Depths		
2011	Shadows & Tall Trees		
2011	Strange Horizons		
2012	Black Static*		
2012	Interzone		
2012	SFX		
2012	The Horror Zine		
2013	Interzone*	Andy Cox	
2013	Black Static	Andy Cox	
2013	SFX	Dave Bradley	
2013	Shadows & Tall Trees	Michael Kelly	
2014	Clarkesworld*	Neil Clarke	
2014	Clarkesworld*	Sean Wallace	
2014	Clarkesworld*	Kate Baker	
2014	Black Static	Andy Cox	
2014	Interzone	Andy Cox	
2014	Shadows & Tall Trees	Michael Kelly	
2015	Holdfast Magazine*	Laurel Sills	
2015	Holdfast Magazine*	Lucy Smee	
2015	Black Static	Andy Cox	
2015	Interzone	Andy Cox	
2015	Lightspeed	John Joseph Adams	
2015	Sein und Werden	Rachel Kendall	
2016	Beneath Ceaseless Skies*		
2016	Black Static		
2016	Holdfast Magazine		
2016	Interzone		
2017	Tor.com*		
2017	Black Static		
2017	Ginger Nuts of Horror		
2017	Interzone		
2017	Uncanny Magazine		
2018	Shoreline of Infinity*	Noel Chidwick	
2018	Black Static	Andy Cox	
2018	Ginger Nuts of Horror	Jim Mcleod	
2018	Grimdark Magazine	Adrian Collins	
2018	Interzone	Andy Cox	
2019	Uncanny Magazine*		
2019	Black Static		
2019	Ginger Nuts of Horror		
2019	Interzone		
2019	Shoreline of Infinity		
2020	FIYAH*		
2020	Black Static		
2020	The Dark		
2020	F&SF		
2020	Ginger Nuts of Horror		
2020	Shoreline of Infinity		
2021	Strange Horizons*		
2021	Black Static		
2021	The Dark		
2021	FIYAH		
2021	Ginger Nuts of Horror		
2021	Shoreline of Infinity		
2022	Apex Magazine*		
2022	Anathema Magazine		
2022	Black Static		
2022	Ginger Nuts of Horror		
2022	Interzone		
2022	Shoreline of Infinity		
2023	Interzone*		
2023	Ginger Nuts of Horror		
2023	Shoreline of Infinity		
2023	Strange Horizons		
2024	Shoreline of Infinity*		
2024	Hellebore		
2024	Interzone (IZ Digital)		
2024	khōréō		
2024	Occult Detective Magazine		
2025	ParSec*		
2025	Phantasmagoria		
2025	Ginger Nuts of Horror		
2026	Remains*		
2026	Ginger Nuts of Horror		
2026	Phantasmagoria		
2026	Strange Horizons		
2026	Mythaxis Magazine		
