= British Fantasy Award for Best Independent Press =

British literary award

- Awarded for: An independent press active during the previous year
- Country: United Kingdom
- Presented by: British Fantasy Society
- First award: 1977; 49 years ago
- Most recent winner: Newcon Press
- Website: britishfantasysociety.org

The British Fantasy Award for Best Independent Press is a literary award given annually as part of the British Fantasy Awards.

== History ==
The award was initially titled "Best Small Press". Beginning in 2009, PS Publishing withdrew from consideration of the award. Instead, the imprint sponsored the award. The final year of the sponsorship occurred in 2014. Beginning in 2015, the award was retitled to "Best Independent Press."

== Winners and shortlists ==
* Winners

Year	Press	Ref.
1977	Anduril*	
1977	Chacal	
1977	Dark Horizons 15	
1978	Fantasy Tales #1*	
1978	Chacal #2	
1979	Fantasy Tales #2*	
1979	Cthulhu 2: Tales of the Cthulhu Mythos	
1979	Longbore the Inexhuastible	
1979	Weirdbook #13	
1979	Whispers #10	
1980	Fantasy Tales #5*	
1980	Fantasy Media Vol. 1	
1980	Whispers #13-14	
1981	Airgedlamh*	
1981	Fantasy Media	
1981	Fantasy Newsletter	
1981	Kadath	
1982	Fantasy Tales*	
1982	Dark Horizons	
1982	Kadath	
1983	Fantasy Tales*	
1983	Dark Horizons	
1983	Whispers	
1984	Ghosts & Scholars*	
1985	Whispers*	
1985	Dark Horizons	
1985	Fantasy Tales	
1985	Ghosts & Scholars	
1986	Fantasy Tales*	
1987	Fantasy Tales*	
1987	Dagon	
1987	The Horror Show	
1988	Dagon*	
1989	Dagon*	
1990	Dagon*	
1991	Dark Dreams*	
1991	Aklo	
1991	Ghosts & Scholars	
1991	Iniquities / New Blood	
1992	Peeping Tom*	
1992	Chills	
1992	Dark Dreams	
1992	Dark Horizons	
1992	Ghosts & Scholars	
1993	Peeping Tom*	
1994	Dementia 13*	
1995	Necrofile*	
1995	Peeping Tom	
1995	The Third Alternative	
1995	Voices from Shadow	
1996	The Third Alternative*	
1996	Cemetery Dance	
1996	Peeping Tom	
1996	Sierra Heaven	
1996	Visionary Tongue	
1997	H. P. Lovecraft: A Life*	
1997	Broadsword	
1997	Cemetery Dance	
1997	Ghosts & Scholars	
1997	Peeping Tom	
1997	The Third Alternative	
1997	Visionary Tongue	
1998	Interzone*	
1998	Peeping Tom	
1998	Samhain	
1998	Tanjen Press	
1998	The Third Alternative	
1999	The Third Alternative*	
1999	The Alchemy Press	
1999	Ghosts & Scholars	
1999	Kimota	
1999	Nasty Piece of Work	
1999	Prism	
1999	Pumpkin Books	
1999	Samhain	
2000	Razorblade Press*	
2000	Enigmatic Press	
2000	Interzone	
2000	Kimota	
2000	The Third Alternative	
2001	PS Publishing*	
2001	The Alchemy Press	
2001	At the World's End	
2001	Razorblade Press	
2001	The Third Alternative	
2002	PS Publishing*	
2002	The Alien Online	
2002	Dark Horizons	
2002	Telos Publishing	
2002	The Third Alternative	
2003	PS Publishing*	
2003	The Alien Online	
2003	Roadworks	
2003	Telos Publishing	
2003	The Third Alternative	
2004	PS Publishing*	
2004	The Alien Online	
2004	Elastic Press	
2004	Scheherazade	
2004	The Third Alternative	
2005	Elastic Press*	
2005	The Alien Online	
2005	Pendragon Press	
2005	Postscripts	
2005	PS Publishing	
2005	Scheherazade	
2005	Telos Publishing	
2005	The Third Alternative	
2006	PS Publishing*	
2006	Elastic Press	
2006	Nemonymous	
2006	Pendragon Press	
2006	TTA Press	
2007	PS Publishing*	
2007	Elastic Press	
2007	Pendragon Press	
2007	Telos Publishing	
2007	TTA Press	
2008	PS Publishing*	
2008	Black Static	
2008	Elastic Press	
2008	Postscripts	
2008	Screaming Dreams	
2009	Elastic Press*	
2009	NewCon Press	
2009	Pendragon Press	
2009	Screaming Dreams	
2009	TTA Press	
2010	Telos Publishing*	
2010	NewCon Press	
2010	Screaming Dreams	
2010	Subterranean Press	
2010	TTA Press	
2011	Telos Publishing*	
2011	Atomic Fez	
2011	Gray Friar Press	
2011	Pendragon Press	
2011	TTA Press	
2012	Chômu Press*	
2012	Gray Friar Press	
2012	NewCon Press	
2012	Spectral Press	
2013	ChiZine Publications*	
2013	Gray Friar Press	
2013	Spectral Press	
2013	TTA Press	
2014	The Alchemy Press*	
2014	Fox Spirit Books	
2014	NewCon Press	
2014	Spectral Press	
2015	Fox Spirit Books*	
2015	The Alchemy Press	
2015	NewCon Press	
2015	Spectral Press	
2016	Angry Robot*	
2016	The Alchemy Press	
2016	Fox Spirit Books	
2016	NewCon Press	
2017	Grimbold Books*	
2017	The Alchemy Press	
2017	Fox Spirit Books	
2017	NewCon Press	
2017	TTA Press	
2018	Unsung Stories*	
2018	Fox Spirit Books	
2018	Grimbold Books	
2018	NewCon Press	
2018	Salt Publishing	
2019	Unsung Stories*	
2019	Fox Spirit Books	
2019	Luna Press Publishing	
2019	NewCon Press	
2020	Rebellion Publishing	
2020	Aqueduct Press	
2020	Black Shuck Books	
2020	Luna Press Publishing	
2020	NewCon Press	
2020	Undertow Publications	
2021	Luna Press Publishing*	
2021	Black Shuck Books	
2021	Flame Tree Press	
2021	Unsung Stories	
2022	Luna Press Publishing*	
2022	Black Shuck Books	
2022	Unsung Stories	
2022	Wizard's Tower Press	
2023	Luna Press Publishing*	
2023	Black Shuck Books	
2023	Flame Tree Press	
2023	NewCon Press	
2024	Flame Tree Press*	
2024	Angry Robot	
2024	Black Shuck Books	
2024	Eibonvale Press	
2024	Luna Press Publishing	
2024	NewCon Press	
2025	Flame Tree Press*	
2025	NewCon Press	
2025	Black Shuck Books	
2025	Luna Press Publishing	
2025	Swan River	
2026	Newcon Press*	
2026	Flame Tree Press	
2026	Luna Press	
2026	Black Shuck Books	
