= Steven Pirie =

English writer

Steven Pirie is an English writer of horror, fantasy and humour based in Liverpool.

== Bibliography ==
=== Novels ===
- Digging up Donald (Immanion Press, 2004)
- Burying Brian (Immanion Press, 2010)

=== Short stories ===
- Rogers' Cold Fusion (Planet Relish Magazine, 2003)
- What Goes Up (The Phone Book, 2003)
- A Foot in Alpha Centauri's Door (Planet Relish Magazine, 2003)
- Roger's Shoe, or Hat, or Dog (The Dark Krypt, 2003)
- An Old Problem (The Phone Book, 2003)
- Susan's Eyes (Flash Me Magazine, 2003)
- The Kiss (Flashquake Magazine, 2003)
- Colquitt's High-energy Trousers (Andromeda Spaceways Inflight Magazine, 2003)
- Spartacus (Alien Skin Magazine, 2003)
- Bob, and Clair, and the Meaning of Life (Whispers of Wickedness magazine, 2004)
- A Small Box of Rat Poison (Whispers of Wickedness online, 2004)
- Titan's Teashop (Whispers of Wickedness online, 2004)
- And God Saw That It Was... (Whispers of Wickedness online, 2004)
- The Soup in Uncle Norman's Beard (Tryst, 2005)
- The Black Arts of Mrs Beelzebub From Number Six (The Mammoth Book of New Comic Fantasy, 2005)
- Colquitt's High-energy Trousers (The Mammoth Book of New Comic Fantasy, 2005)
- The Two Funereal Urns of Mrs Tate (Whispers of Wickedness magazine, 2005)
- Mrs Mathews is Afraid of Cricket Bats (Dark Doorways, 2006)
- An Occasional Card (Tryst, 2006)
- Harry, the Wife, and Mrs Robson, Hell's Temptress from Number Six (Andromeda Spaceways Inflight Magazine 24, 2006)
- Mary's Gift, the Stars, and Frank's Pisser (Zencore, Nemonymous 7, 2007)
- Of Kate, and Love, and the Faraway Door (AfterburnSF, 2007)
- To Pull a Child from a Woman (Sein und Werden, 2007)
- Bob, and Clair, and the Meaning of Life (Ink Magazine, 2007)
- Lucy's Flower (The Horror Express 6, 2007)
- Night Dreaming (The Future Fire, 2008)
- The Love Ship Guide to Seduction in Zero Gravity (Murky Depths, 2008)
- Leonard Rom (Premonitions, 2008)
- The Book of Ruth (Black Static, 2008)
- The Love Ship Guide to Seduction in Zero Gravity (Galaxies, 2009)
- When Norman Dreamed (Sonar 4 Horror and Science Fiction Anthology, 2009)
- Ruth's Dying Breath in the Night (Necrotic Tissue, 2009)
- The Goodship Hyperdrive (Murky Depths, 2010)
- The Spring Heel (Haunted Legends, 2010)
- To Pull a Child from a Woman (Sideshow 2, 2010)
- Ruth Across the Sea (Shock Totem, 2011)
- This is Mary's Moon (Black Static, 2011)
