= British Fantasy Award for Best Artist =

Annual literary award for speculative fiction

- Awarded for: An artist working in the field of speculative fiction
- Country: United Kingdom
- Presented by: British Fantasy Society
- First award: 1977; 49 years ago
- Most recent winner: Jenni Coutts
- Website: britishfantasysociety.org

The British Fantasy Award for Best Artist is an award given annually as part of the British Fantasy Awards.

== Winners and shortlists ==
* Winners

Best Artwork (1977-1979)
Year	Artist	Work	Ref.
1977	Michael Kaluta*	"The Sacrifice"	
1977	Stephen Fabian	Fantastic Stories, August 1976	
1977	Bernie Wrightson	"Loggerhead"	
1978	Stephen Fabian*	"The End of Days"	
1978	Jim Pitts	Wark #9	
1978	Frank Frazetta	Dark Crusade	
1979	Boris Vallejo	The Amazon Princess and Her Pet	
1979	George Barr	Hasan	
1979	Jeff Jones	Queens Walk in the Dust, page 97	
1979	Brian Froud	The Land of Froud, plate 12	
1979	Simon Horsfall	"The Sorcerer", from Longbore the Inexhaustible	

Best Artist (1980-present)
Year	Artist	Ref.
1980	Stephen Fabian*	
1980	Dave Carson	
1980	Rowena Morrill	
1981	Dave Carson*	
1981	Stephen Fabian	
1981	Jim Fitzpatrick	
1981	Jim Pitts	
1982	Dave Carson*	
1982	Jim Fitzpatrick	
1982	Stephen Jones	
1983	Dave Carson*	
1983	Stephen Jones	
1983	John Stewart	
1984	Rowena Morrill*	
1985	Stephen Fabian*	
1985	Dave Carson	
1985	Jim Pitts	
1986	J. K. Potter*	
1987	J. K. Potter*	
1987	Dave Carson	
1987	Stephen Fabian	
1988	J. K. Potter*	
1989	Dave Carson*	
1990	Dave Carson*	
1991	Les Edwards*	
1991	Oliver Frey	
1991	Dallas C. Goffin	
1991	Dave McKean	
1991	Jim Pitts	
1992	Jim Pitts*	
1992	Dallas C. Goffin	
1992	Dave McKean	
1993	Jim Pitts*	
1994	Les Edwards*	
1995	Martin McKenna*	
1995	Jim Burns	
1995	Les Edwards	
1995	Dallas C. Goffin	
1996	Josh Kirby*	
1996	Les Edwards	
1996	Jim Pitts	
1996	SMS	
1997	Jim Burns*	
1997	Les Edwards	
1997	Madeleine Finnegan	
1997	Dave McKean	
1997	Jim Pitts	
1997	J. K. Potter	
1998	Jim Burns*	
1998	Bob Covington	
1998	Les Edwards	
1998	Josh Kirby	
1998	Dave McKean	
1998	J. K. Potter	
1999	Bob Covington*	
1999	Steve Adams	
1999	Les Edwards	
1999	Gerald Gaubert	
1999	Gary Gianni	
1999	Alan Hunter	
1999	Dave McKean	
2000	Les Edwards*	
2000	Lisa Busby	
2000	Gerald Gaubert	
2000	Josh Kirby	
2000	Iain Maynard	
2001	Jim Burns*	
2001	Les Edwards	
2001	Chris Nurse	
2001	J. K. Potter	
2001	Anne Sudworth	
2002	Jim Burns*	
2002	Poppy Alexander	
2002	Simon Duric	
2002	Les Edwards	
2002	Edward Miller	
2003	Les Edwards*	
2003	Lara Bandilla	
2003	Randy Broecker	
2003	Bob Covington	
2003	Dominic Harman	
2003	Chris Moore	
2003	J. K. Potter	
2004	Les Edwards*	
2004	Dave Bezzina	
2004	Deirdre Counihan	
2004	Bob Covington	
2004	Dominic Harman	
2005	Les Edwards*	
2005	John Coulthart	
2005	Allen Koszowski	
2005	David Magitis	
2005	Richard Marchand	
2005	Ian Simmons	
2006	Les Edwards*	
2006	Clive Barker	
2006	Randy Broecker	
2006	Dominic Harman	
2006	Richard Marchand	
2006	Robert Sammelin	
2007	Vincent Chong*	
2007	Les Edwards	
2007	Dean Harkness	
2007	Edward Miller	
2007	John Picacio	
2008	Vincent Chong*	
2008	Les Edwards	
2008	Dave McKean	
2008	Bryan Talbot	
2008	Steve Upham	
2009	Vincent Chong*	
2009	Dave McKean	
2009	Edward Miller	
2009	Lee Thompson	
2009	Les Edwards	
2010	Vincent Chong*	
2010	Les Edwards	
2010	Shaun Tan	
2010	Steve Upham	
2010	Charles Vess	
2011	Vincent Chong*	
2011	Ben Baldwin	
2011	Daniele Serra	
2011	Les Edwards	
2011	Paul Mudie	
2012	Daniele Serra*	
2012	Ben Baldwin	
2012	Vincent Chong	
2012	Les Edwards	
2013	Sean Phillips*	
2013	Ben Baldwin	
2013	Vincent Chong	
2013	Les Edwards	
2013	David Rix	
2014	Joey Hi-Fi	
2014	Ben Baldwin	
2014	Vincent Chong	
2014	Tula Lotay	
2014	Adam Oehlers	
2014	Daniele Serra	
2015	Karla Ortiz*	
2015	Ben Baldwin	
2015	Vincent Chong	
2015	Les Edwards	
2015	Sarah Anne Langton	
2015	Daniele Serra	
2016	Julie Dillon*	
2016	Ben Baldwin	
2016	Vincent Chong	
2016	Evelinn Enoksen	
2016	Sarah Anne Langton	
2016	Jeffrey Alan Love	
2017	Daniele Serra*	
2017	Ben Baldwin	
2017	Evelinn Enoksen	
2017	Sarah Anne Langton	
2018	Jeffrey Alan Love*	
2018	Ben Baldwin	
2018	Victo Ngai	
2018	Daniele Serra	
2018	Sophie E. Tallis	
2018	Sana Takeda	
2019	Vince Haig*	
2019	David Rix	
2019	Daniele Serra	
2019	Sophie E. Tallis	
2020	Ben Baldwin*	
2020	Vince Haig	
2020	Jackie Morris	
2020	David Rix	
2021	Daniele Serra*	
2021	Warwick Fraser-Coombe	
2021	David Rix	
2021	Vincent Sammy	
2022	Jenni Coutts*	
2022	Olga Beliaeva	
2022	Randy Broecker	
2022	Alison Buck	
2022	Vincent Sammy	
2022	Daniele Serra	
2023	Vince Haig*	
2023	Chris Baker, AKA Fangorn	
2023	Ben Baldwin	
2023	Jenni Coutts	
2023	Dan Hillier	
2024	Asya Yordonova*	
2024	Jenni Coutts	
2024	Vince Haig	
2024	David Rix	
2025	Kelly Chong*	
2025	Jenni Coutts	
2025	Greg Chapman	
2025	L. N. Bayen	
2026	Jenni Coutts*	
2026	Mina Ikemoto Ghosh	
2026	Vincent Chong	
2026	Ben Baldwin	
2026	Kelly Chong	
