= Ylem =

Hypothetical original substance or state of matter

Ylem (/ˈiːlɛm/ or /ˈaɪləm/) is a hypothetical original substance or condensed state of matter, which became subatomic particles and elements as are understood today. The term was used by George Gamow, his student Ralph Alpher, and their associates in the late 1940s, having resuscitated it from Middle English after Alpher found it in Webster's Second dictionary, where it was defined as "the first substance from which the elements were supposed to have been formed."

In modern understanding, the "ylem" as described by Gamow was the primordial plasma, formed in baryogenesis, which underwent Big Bang nucleosynthesis and was opaque to radiation. Recombination of the charged plasma into neutral atoms made the universe transparent at the age of 380,000 years, and the radiation released is still observable as cosmic microwave background radiation.

== History ==
The term comes from an obsolete Middle English philosophical word that Alpher said he found in Webster's dictionary. The word means something along the lines of "primordial substance from which all matter is formed" (that in ancient mythology of many different cultures was called the cosmic egg) and ultimately derives from the hūlē (Ancient Greek: ὕλη), probably through an accusative singular form in Latin hylen, hylem. In an oral history interview in 1968 Gamow talked about ylem as an old Hebrew word (possibly היולי "primordial", from the same Greek root ὕλη).

The ylem is what Gamow and colleagues presumed to exist immediately after the Big Bang. Within the ylem, there were assumed to be a large number of high-energy photons present. Alpher and Robert Herman made a scientific prediction in 1948 that we should still be able to observe these red-shifted photons today as an ambient cosmic microwave background radiation (CMBR) pervading all space with a temperature of about 5 kelvins (when the CMBR was actually first detected in 1965, its temperature was found to be 3 kelvins). It is now recognized that the CMBR originated at the transition from predominantly ionized hydrogen to non-ionized hydrogen at around 400,000 years after the Big Bang.

== In popular culture ==
After the term ylem was resuscitated by Alpher, it was used in the 1952 science fiction novel Jack of Eagles by James Blish. It was also used by John Brunner in his 1959 short story "Round Trip", reprinted in the collection Not Before Time. Keith Laumer in the novel Dinosaur Beach introduces the ylem field 1969. The term is also used by British author Richard Calder in the 1990s to describe the quantum mechanical state of the "quantum magic" in the girls/robots in his "Dead" trilogy (Dead Girls, Dead Boys, Dead Things). John C. Wright used the term in his debut novel The Golden Age to describe a "pseudo-matter" that forms "temporary virtual particles". A German black metal band "Dark Fortress" also released an album titled "Ylem". Synaesthesia, a trance classic by The Thrillseekers, has an "Ylem" remix. The video game series Ultima uses "Ylem" as a Word of Power in its incantation and runic based spell casting system, its meaning being "matter".

In 1981, Trudy Myrrh Reagan formed an organization, "Ylem: Artists Using Science and Technology" (later written YLEM), in the San Francisco Bay Area.

It is also a usable word in the Official Scrabble Players Dictionary, Fifth edition.

Some Frank Zappa releases include the phrase "This is Zappa Family Archival Matter In Living Ylem" among their copyright notices.

== See also ==
- Apeiron (cosmology)
- Baryogenesis
- Big Bang nucleosynthesis
- Quark matter
