= The Future Fire =

Science fiction magazine

The Future Fire is a small-press, online science fiction magazine (ISSN 1746-1839), run by a joint British–US team of editors. The magazine was launched in January 2005 and releases issues four times a year, with stories, articles, and reviews in both HTML and PDF formats. At times (notably 2006–7, 2010–11) issues appeared more sporadically than this.

== Contents ==
The Future Fire publishes both fiction and nonfiction. For fiction it publishes speculative fiction, cyberpunk and dark fantasy, with a focus on social and political themes and mundane rather than hard SF. In the area of nonfiction it publishes reviews and interviews with people such as Cory Doctorow, author of Down and Out in the Magic Kingdom, and Kevin Warwick the cyborg scientist, articles on new media, posthumanism, and artificial intelligence. In 2010 The Future Fire published themed issues on feminist science fiction and queer science fiction.

The Future Fire has published stories by:

- Neil Ayres
- Bruce Boston
- Rebecca Buchanan
- Silvia Moreno-Garcia
- Maria Grech Ganado
- Terry Grimwood
- Rhys Hughes
- Vylar Kaftan
- Petra Kuppers
- Alison Littlewood
- Sandra McDonald
- Sarah Pinsker
- Steven Pirie
- Malena Salazar Maciá
- Sofia Samatar
- Brett Alexander Savory
- Benjanun Sriduangkaew
- Richard Thieme
- Lavie Tidhar
- Jo Walton
- Aliya Whiteley
- Lynda Williams

It has included illustrations and artwork by:

- Martin Hanford
- Tais Teng

The Future Fire has run occasional writers' conventions and competitions, including a flash fiction contest sponsored by the MirrorMask movie, and a satirical writing contest based on spam subject lines judged by Peter Tennant.

== Staff ==
- Djibril al-Ayad, General editor
- Regina de Burca, Associate editor
- Valeria Vitale, Associate editor

== Anthologies ==
The Future Fire has published seven anthologies (under the imprint Futurefire.net Publications): Outlaw Bodies, co-edited by Lori Selke (ISBN 978-0-9573975-0-7), in 2012, a collection of stories on the theme of forbidden or constrained bodies, disability, feminism and trans issues; and We See a Different Frontier, co-edited with Fabio Fernandes (ISBN 978-0-9573975-2-1) in 2013, with preface by Aliette de Bodard and critical afterword by Ekaterina Sedia, which raised over $4,500 in crowdfunding via Peerbackers; a third anthology, Accessing the Future, co-edited by Kathryn Allan, raised over $8,000 via IndieGogo, and received a starred review from Publishers Weekly; TFF-X (co-edited by Djibril al-Ayad, Cécile Matthey and Valeria Vitale) and Fae Visions of the Mediterranean (co-edited by Valeria Vitale) appeared in late 2015 and early 2016 respectively. A mixed anthology of fiction and essays related to classical monsters, Making Monsters co-edited by Emma Bridges, was jointly released with the Institute of Classical Studies in 2018. In 2022 they published an anthology of speculative noir, guest edited by Valeria Vitale, under the title Noir Fire.
