= Peter Tennant =

British writer

- Writing career
- Genre: Horror fiction short fiction speculative fiction
- Notable awards: British Fantasy Award, Best Non-Fiction, for Whispers of Wickedness reviews

Peter Tennant is a prolific writer of horror, fantasy and speculative fiction, and award-winning columnist and reviewer for Black Static magazine. He has also written or run review columns for genre magazines including Whispers of Wickedness, Zene, Touchpaper, Maelstrom, The Third Alternative, Dream, Vector, Dreams from the Stranger’s Café, Black Tears, The Zone, Unreal Dreams, Zest, Sol and The Fix. In 2008 he won the British Fantasy Award for Best Non-Fiction for the Whispers of Wickedness Reviews website.

== Bibliography ==
=== 1980s ===
- The Conquest of the Earth in Jennings Magazine 6 (1987)
- The Machine That Turned On, in Opus Quarterly 4 (1988)
- Swansong in Ways of Living anthology (1988)

=== 1990s ===
- The Unpragmatic Gesture: A Pas de Deux for Police Officer and Demiurge, in Exuberance 3 (1991)
- The Healer, in Dream 29 (1991)
- Hunger, in Winter Gold anthology (1991)
- The Cryptogram, in Far Point 3 (1992)
- Stay of Execution, in Rattler's Tale 14 (1992)
- The Rorschach Test, in Memes 7 (1992)
- Winston and the Demon, in Grotesque 2 (1993)
- Grist for the Mill, in Psychotrope 1 (1994)
- Love Hurts, in Dreams from the Stranger's Café 2 (1994)
- Chameleon, in Alternaties 18 (1994)
- Late Arrival, in Alternaties 18 (1994)
- The Men Watching, in Dreams from the Stranger's Café 3 (1994)
- Special Talent, in Alternaties 19 (1994)
- Little Monsters, in Cold Cuts II: More Tales of Terror (1994)
- The Dead Planet, in Alternaties 20 (1994)
- Storm Warning, in Rattler's Tale 22 (1994)
- The Homecoming, in The Unnameable 4 (1995)
- Long Ago and Far Away, in Premonitions 4 (1995)
- The Eye of the Beholder, in Axiom 1 (1995)
- Flesh and Blood, in Urges 1 (1995)
- Taking Care of Patrick: Fact and Fantasy, in Axiom 2 (1995)
- Sales Pitch, in Night Dreams 3 (1995)
- The Wisdom of His Words” and Blood After Dark, in Sierra Heaven 1 (1995)
- Superstition, in Footsteps 1 (1995)
- The Murder Mystery, in Kimota 3 (1995)
- A Politically Correct Poem, in Encounters anthology (1995)
- Man, Woman, Steam, in Night Dreams 4 (1996)
- Malcolm and the Medusa, in Urges 2 (1996)
- Loving the Alien, in Urges 2 (1996)
- Arthurian Romance, in Flickers ‘n’ Frames 25 (1996)
- Down at the VA Mission, in Scar Tissue 9 (1996)
- All the Other Books, in Sierra Heaven 2 (1996)
- Question and Answer, in The Snu 4 (1996)
- Vox Populi, in The Snu 4 (1996)
- One Moment in Time, in The Snu 4 (1996)
- After the War, in The Snu 4 (1996)
- The Aliens Who Saved the World, in RQC 4 (1996)
- The Fortune Teller, in Kimota 4 (1996)
- The Shooting Gallery, in Peeping Tom 23 (1996)
- Rollover Week, in Night Dreams 5 (1996)
- The Boy in the Box, in Night Dreams 5 (1996)
- Blood, Guts and Technicolor, in Visions 2 (1996)
- The Gods of the Roon, in Odyssey 6 (1996)
- Are You a Serial Killer?, in Hallow-Zine 1 (1996)
- The Sculpture Garden: A Tale of Love and Betrayal, in Urges 3 (1996)
- The Postman’s Tale, in Footsteps 3 (1996)
- Toward a New Cultural Dialectic, in Nasty Piece of Work 1 (1996)
- The Adulterer, in Nasty Piece of Work 1 (1996)
- Chicken Run, in Visions 3 (1996)
- Carrie’s Child, in Unreal Dreams 1 (1996)
- The Death of a Man, in Kimota 5 (1996)
- Signing Out, in Nasty Piece of Work 2 (1997)
- The Fall of Man, in Visions 4 (1997)
- Click!, in Dark Eyes 1 (1997)
- Proof Positive, in Unreal Dreams 2 (1997)
- Funeral Customs from Around the World, in Strix 5 (1997)
- Caught On Camera, in Visions 5 (1997)
- The Dragon’s Progeny, in Odyssey 8 (1997)
- Vernissage, in Nasty Piece of Work 3 (1997)
- The Victim, in Unreal Dreams 3 (1997)
- Aversion Therapy, in Urges 4 (1997)
- The Haunted Town, in Footsteps 4 (1997)
- Indecent Proposal: Writer’s Cut, in Nasty Piece of Work 4 (1997)
- White Rabbit, in Nasty Piece of Work 4 (1997)
- The Earthly Paradise, in Kimota 6 (1997)
- The Magician, in Strix 6 (1997)
- Eating Out, in Nasty Piece of Work 5 (1997)
- The Salesman’s Story, in Odyssey 9 (1997)
- Healing, in Strix 6 (1997)
- Notes from a Writer’s Journal, in Oktobyr 1 (1997)
- The Giving of Names, in Scaremongers anthology (1997)
- Saved (for later), in Nasty Piece of Work 6 (1997)
- Anachronism, in Utter Entropy (1997)
- The Book of Forbidden Knowledge, in Kimota 7 (1997)
- The Alien Enquiry, in Zest 2 (1998)
- Understanding Man, in Unreal Dreams 4 (1998)
- Horrorscopes: A Lover’s Guide, in Dark Horizon 37 (1998)
- The World of Numbers, in Axiom 4 (1998)
- Requiem, in Unreal Dreams 5/6 (1998)
- The Old Army Trick, in Visions 11 (1998)
- Terrible Forming, in Zest 4 (1998)
- The Secret Agent, in Monomyth 13 (1998)
- Not By Its Cover, in Sackcloth & Ashes 1 (1998)
- The Geller Effect, in Kimota 9 (1998)
- Transference, in Nasty Piece of Work 9 (1998)
- A Reputation for Wisdom, in Sierra Heaven 4½ (1998)
- New Adventures in Technology, in Sierra Heaven 4½ (1998)
- The Head of Ar, in Tales of the Grotesque and Arabesque 3 (1998)
- Notes from an Editor’s Journal, in Oktobyr 98 anthology (1998)
- New Judaism, in Piffle 3 (1998)
- The Kundalini Ritual (written with Paul Bradshaw), in Sackcloth & Ashes 2 (1998)
- Penis Envy, in Visions 13 (1998)
- A Letter to Lovecraft, in Enigmatic Tales 3 (1998)
- The Choices You Make, in Nasty Piece of Work 10 (1998)
- The Incentive Scheme, in Rattler's Tale 26 (1998)
- Sexual Politics, in Roadworks 3 (1999)
- The Saboteur, in Roadworks 3 (1999)
- Revenge World Inc, in Roadworks 3 (1999)
- Windows of Opportunity, in Monomyth 16 (1999)
- Scoop, in Strix 14 (1999)
- Ancient of Days, in Dark Fantasy Newsletter 4 (1999)
- The New Law of Economics: A Socialist Fable, in Dark Fantasy Newsletter 4 (1999)
- Salem’s Parking Lot, in Kimota 10 (1999)
- The Invaders, in Kimota 10 (1999)
- Juju, in Kimota 10 (1999)
- The Bones, in Kimota 10 (1999)
- A Pleasing Discovery, in Monomyth 17 (1999)
- The Crash Test Dummies, in Monomyth 18 (1999)
- Woman’s Lot, in Roadworks 4 (1999)
- Lost and Found, in Tales of the Grotesque and Arabesque 5 (1999)
- Peter, Paul and One Other: A Parable, in Peeping Tom 33 (1999)
- Dirty Talk, in Unhinged 2 (1999)
- The Threshing Floor, in Nasty Piece of Work 12 (1999)
- A Small Death, in Nasty Piece of Work 12 (1999)
- The Hit, in Maelstrom 9 (1999)
- Torquemada 2000, in Dark Fantasy Newsletter (1999)
- Boxing Clever, in Dark Fantasy Newsletter (1999)
- The Mesmerist, in Dark Fantasy Newsletter (1999)
- Shocking Pink, in Dark Fantasy Newsletter (1999)
- Travellers’ Tales, in Sci-Fright 4 (1999)
- Jamming with the Dead, Electronic Enigmatic (1999)
- The Abridged Nostradamus, in Kimota 11 (1999)
- The Thing in the Park, in The Dream Zone 4 (1999)
- Letting Go, in Sackcloth & Ashes 6 (1999)
- Getting Back With George, Enigmatic Tales 6 (1999)
- Jamming with the Dead, Enigmatic Tales (1999)

=== 2000s ===
- Water Baby, in The Dream Zone 5 (2000)
- Death of a Valkyrie, in Haunted Dreams 2: Death of a Valkyrie (2000)
- Geraldine and the Wolfman, in Haunted Dreams 2: Death of a Valkyrie (2000)
- The Head that Wears the Crown, in Sci-Fright 6 (2000)
- The Case for the Defence, in Enigmatic Tales 8 (2000)
- A March to the Scaffold, in Psychotrope 8 (2000)
- Rosemary’s Afterbirth, in Kimota 12 (2000)
- Love Eternal, in Kimota 12 (2000)
- Collision, in Kimota 12 (2000)
- How the Stone was Moved, in Kimota 12 (2000)
- Pop Quiz: Are You a Werewolf?, in Dead Things 4 (2000)
- Measureless to Man, in The Dream Zone 6 (2000)
- Outline, in The Dream Zone 6 (2000)
- The Object of the Experiment, in Roadworks 8 (2000)
- The Collaboration, in Enigmatic Tales 9 (2000)
- O What a Friend We Have in Jesus, in The Dream Zone 7 (2000)
- Love, and What It Means, in Unhinged 6 (2000)
- A Halloween Story, 30,000 word novella, self-published (2000)
- Confession of a Hollow Man, 21,000 word novella from Haunted Dreams (2000)
- The Alphabet Stories, in The Dream Zone 8 (2001)
- Ambulance Chasers, in Dead Things 6 (2001)
- The Whitechapel Follies, in Roadworks 11 (2001)
- Schizodemonia, in Dark Horizons 39 (2001)
- The Necromancer’s Tale, in Kimota 14 (2001)
- One Bad Apple, in Hidden Corners 2 (2001)
- Fortunato and Montresor Reconciled, in Roadworks 12 (2001)
- Five Incidents of Rage and One of Self-Loathing, in Hidden Corners 3 (2001)
- Peter Tennant and the Truth about Imagination: A Story by Robert Wolfe, in The Dream Zone 10 (2001)
- Meeting the Victim, in Hidden Corners 4 (2001)
- The Calgary Beggar, in Unhinged Online 4 (2002)
- The Stone Which the Builders Rejected, in The Dream Zone 12 (2002)
- Starting Over, in Roadworks 14 (2002)
- Where the Bodies are Buried, in Darkness Rising V: Black Shroud of Fear (2003)
- The Weapon, in Monomyth 24 (2003)
- Revenge World Inc, in Whispers of Wickedness (2003)
- Love Hurts, in Whispers of Wickedness (2003)
- Twisted, in Whispers of Wickedness (2003)
- The Beautiful Dead, Midnight Street 2 (2004)
- Success... and How to Achieve it, Whispers of Wickedness 10 (2005)
- A Mother's Pride, Whispers of Wickedness 11 (2005)
- Dissonance, Sein und Werden 1.1 (2006)
- De Sade: Reinventing his Story, Sein und Werden 9 (2006)
- A March to the Scaffold, Sein und Werden 10 (2006)
- Dead Message Drop, Whispers of Wickedness 16 (2008)
- Special Needs, Black Static 6 (2008)
- Something from the Wreckage, Midnight Street 11 (2008)
- A Warning to the Spurious, Whispers of Wickedness website (2008)
- The Short Films of David Lynch: A Review?, Sein und Werden 3.4 (2009)
- The Advent Calendar (25 flash fiction stories published in PDF by TTA Press, 2010)
