= CL Hellisen =

South African writer (born 1977)

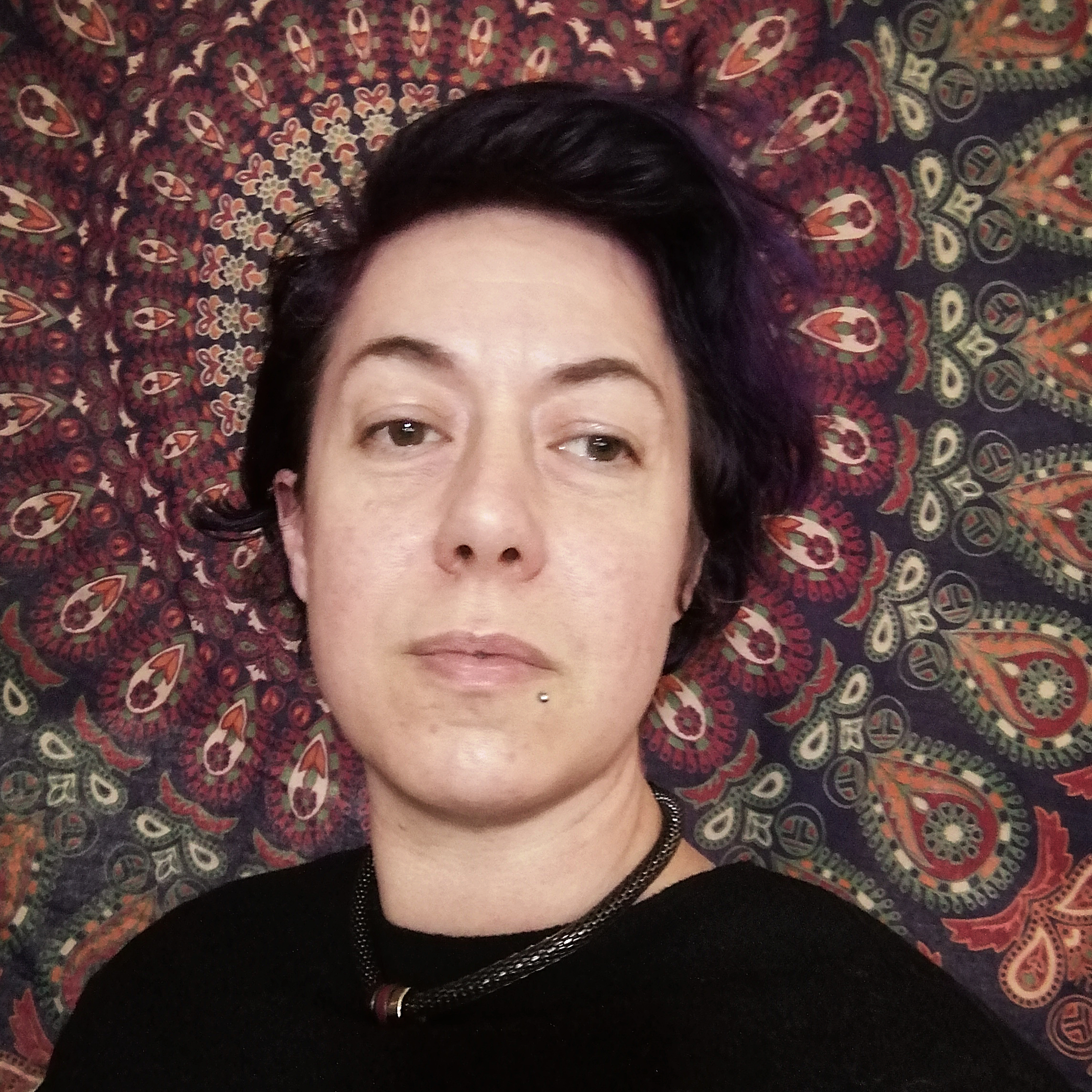
- Born: 31 May 1977 (age 49)
- Occupation: Writer
- Writing career
- Genres: Fantasy, Young adult, Middle Grade
- Notable work: When the Sea is Rising Red
- Website: clhellisenlanding.carrd.co

CL Hellisen, formerly published as Cat Hellisen, (born 31 May 1977) is the South African author of fantasy novels When the Sea is Rising Red, House of Sand and Secrets, and Beastkeeper..

== Biography ==
=== Early life and education ===
Hellisen was born in Cape Town and has lived in Cape Town and Johannesburg, South Africa and Nottingham, England. They currently live in Scotland. Hellisen uses "they/them" pronouns.

They studied at Technikon Witwatersrand before pursuing a literary career.

== Career ==
Hellisen became known for speculative fiction aimed at both young adult and adult audiences. Their fiction combines fantasy and science fiction elements with socially engaged storytelling.

Their debut novel, When the Sea Is Rising Red, was published in 2012 and received attention for its dystopian setting and exploration of class divisions and political violence.

Hellisen later published works including House of Sand and Secrets, Beastkeeper, Cast Long Shadows, and The Girls Who Go Below.

Their stories frequently feature marginalized characters, folklore-inspired settings, and themes related to trauma, memory, and resilience.

== Awards ==
In 2015, Cat Hellisen won the Short Story Day Africa award at the Ake Arts & Book Festival in Nigeria, presented by Prize judge Abubakar Adam Ibrahim, for their story "The Worme Bridge".

They won the 2026 British Fantasy Award for Best Short Fiction for their story "Shadow Jack" and their audiobook The Shape of Monsters won the Audio (fiction) category.

== Works ==
Novels

- When the Sea is Rising Red (Farrar, Straus and Giroux (BYR); 2012 (304 pp.); ISBN 978-0-374-36475-5)
- Beastkeeper (Henry Holt)
- House of Sand and Secrets (Folded Wherry; 2013)
- Charm (Smashwords; 2015)

Short Stories

- "This Reflection of Me" (Jabberwocky 3; Prime Books; 2007)
- "The Subtle Thief" (Something Wicked 4; 2007)
- "Jack of Spades, Reversed" (Something Wicked 17; 2012)
- "Mother, Crone, Maiden" (Tor.com; 2012)
- "Waking" (Apex Magazine, 2014)
- "The Girls Who Go Below" (The Magazine of Fantasy and Science Fiction, 2014)
- "Mouse Teeth" (Terra Incognita, Short Story day Africa Collection, 2015)
- "Serein" (Shimmer #26, July 2015)
- "Golden Wing, Silver Eye" (Ghost in the Cogs Anthology, Broken Eye Books, 31 October 2015)
- "I'm Only Going Over" (Daily Science Fiction, 11 December 2015)
- "The Face of Jarry" (Dreams From the Witch House: Female Voices of Lovecraftian Horror, Anthology, Dark Regions Press, 2016)
- "The Worme Bridge" (Water, Short Story Day Africa collection, 2016)
- "A Green Silk Dress and a Wedding-Death" (The Magazine of Fantasy and Science Fiction, March/April 2017)

== Reception ==
Publishers Weekly writes of When The Sea Is Rising Red, "Hellisen's style features evocative descriptions and unflinching detail, drawing readers into the unusual and intriguing elements that make up Felicita's socially complex world," while Kirkus says that "the worldbuilding intrigues, and the open-ended conclusion begs a sequel." In a starred review, The Bulletin of the Center for Children's Books writes, "Dark, foreboding, and not entirely redemptive, this is an intense look at the seeds of rebellion and the individual consequences they sometimes reap."

Kirkus calls the narration for Beastkeeper, “...thoughtful and lyrical. Figurative prose is memorable yet never flashy.” in a starred review. Publishers Weekly also gave it a star, saying, “Blending modern-day problems and ancient magical curses, Hellisen’s (When the Sea Is Rising Red) novel sparkles like a classic fairy tale, even as it plumbs unpleasant truths.” The Bulletin for the Center for Children's Books suggests in a starred review that "older fans of fairy tales and their retellings will revel in this poetic, tragic, epic story of a girl who is faced with the worst of what people can choose and instead decides to step outside of the curse and make her own way." Voya gives another star and writes, “"Beastkeeper is a bright, beautiful sliver of a novel ... Every page shimmers with magic."

The judges of Short Story Day Africa 2015 said of "The Worme Bridge": "The story works effortlessly to construct an other kind of reality while grounding itself in the real world. The writing is compelling: the reader is drawn into this family and the strangeness that overtakes them. We found this a powerful piece of writing that continues to haunt the reader afterwards.”
