= Terry Martin (publisher) =

Terry Martin is chief executive of United Kingdom-based publishers The House of Murky Depths who published the award-winning (British Fantasy Award) quarterly science fiction and horror anthology Murky Depths, and other comics and paperback books. Also, the imprint Murkee, publishing children's and YA books.

Martin (based in Lincolnshire) is also a writer, poet and artist. He has published a short story collection called Probably Maybe Perhaps.

== Publications ==
- Dice – Defunct tabletop wargames magazine
- Random Factor – Defunct tabletop wargames magazine (co-edited with Kevin Tucker)
- Born To Dye – Defunct Paintball fanzine
- Murky Depths – The Quarterly Anthology of Graphically Dark Speculative Fiction – 18 issues from 2007 to 2011
- Death and The Maiden, Episode No. 4 by Richard Calder – 28-page full colour comic
- Death and The Maiden, Episode No. 5 by Richard Calder – 28-page full colour comic
- Killing Kiss, by Sam Stone – Paperback novel
- Futile Flame, by Sam Stone – Paperback novel
- Demon Dance, by Sam Stone – Paperback novel
- Hateful Heart, by Sam Stone – Paperback novel
- Silent Sand, by Sam Stone – Paperback novel
- A Glimpse of Hell, a graphic novel by Luke Cooper
- Halo Slipping – Mengele's Brain, a graphic novelette by Luke Cooper
- Shadowraith, a graphic novelette by Nicholas Dishington
- Dead Girls, Act 1 – The Last of England by Richard Calder and Leonardo M Giron 48-page full colour limited edition graphic novel
- Dead Girls No. 1 – Born To Run by Richard Calder and Leonardo M Giron part of 8-comic series
- Dead Girls No. 2 – Little Miss Strange by Richard Calder and Leonardo M Giron part of 8-comic series
- Dead Girls No. 3 – Helter Skelter by Richard Calder and Leonardo M Giron part of 8-comic series
- Going to the Moon by Lavie Tidhar and Paul McCaffrey
- Probably Maybe Perhaps (A collection of near and future short stories), by Terry Martin – Paperback

== Bibliography ==
Fiction

- Sam – Fiction, Issue No. 1 (2007)
- The Shed – Alternate Species (2002)
- The Look – Dangerous Creatures, Issue No. 15 (2003)
- Probably Maybe Perhaps – A collection of near and future short stories, Paperback (2012)

NonFiction

- Monthly column for United Kingdom Paintball Sports Federation UKPSF – Paintball Games International
- Writer/Editor on The Paintball Word (UKPSF members' magazine)
