= Georgina Bruce =

British horror short story writer

- Born: United Kingdom
- Occupation: Short story writer
- Writing career
- Language: English
- Website: georginabruce.com

Georgina Bruce is a British horror short story writer. She won the 2017 British Fantasy Award for her work White Rabbit. She has been published in a number of magazines including Black Static, Interzone, Best British Horror and Strange Horizons, as well as having her works collected in This House of Wounds. She works as a teacher in Edinburgh after having traveled the world and spent time living in Japan. Bruce went on a screenwriting course taught by Liz Clegg. She won the place for her first short story after she turned thirty. From there she began working on scriptwriting and teaching it. before moving on to include prose. That first short story was later developed into a short film.

== Bibliography ==
=== Collections ===
- This House of Wounds (2019)
- The House on the Moon (2023)

=== Short fiction ===
- "A Rose Is Rose" (2009)
- "Dreamer of Protocol" (2010)
- "Touch, Typing" (2010)
- "Miss Lonelyhearts" (2010)
- "Crow Voodoo" (2010)
- "Ghost of a Horse Under a Chandelier" (2010)
- "Brilliant" (2011)
- "The Illustrated Dreams of the Ancestors" (2011)
- "Witchwood" (2011)
- "Dogs" (2011)
- "Convent Geometry" (2011)
- "Mr. White Umbrella" (2011)
- "The Queen of Knives" (2013)
- "Cat World" (2013)
- "All Kinds to Make a World" (2013)
- "The Art of Flying" (2013)
- "Wake Up, Phil" (2014)
- "White Rabbit" (2016)
- "Extraterrestrial Folk Metal Fusion" (2016)
- "Little Heart" (2017)
- "The Book of Dreems" (2017)
- "The Art Lovers" (2018)
- "The Seas of the Moon" (2018)
- "Her Blood the Apples, Her Bones the Trees" (2018)
- "Café Corona" (2019)
- "Kuebiko" (2019)
- "Red Queening" (2019)
- "The Lady of Situations" (2019)
- "The Shadow Men" (2019)
