= Cythera (novel) =

1998 novel by Richard Calder

- First edition
- Author: Richard Calder
- Cover artist: Zap Art
- Language: English
- Genre: Science fiction
- Publisher: Orbit Books
- Publication date: 1998
- Publication place: United Kingdom
- Media type: Print (Paperback)
- Pages: 311
- ISBN: 1-85723-533-9
- OCLC: 43056932

Cythera is a science fiction novel by British writer Richard Calder, first published in 1998. While it is not explicitly advertised as a continuation of Calder's previous novels it does appear to be set in the same universe as his "Dead Girls" trilogy, as it references some of the background of the earlier novels and features two supporting characters - Kito and Mosquito - who were introduced in Dead Girls, though knowledge of these novels is not required to understand this stand-alone novel. Due to the timeline given the events of Cythera appear to take place before those of Dead Girls, making this a prequel of sorts.

Richard Calder has said that the inspiration for the novel came from a series of news reports that he heard on the BBC World Service whilst living in Thailand which suggested that England was gripped by hysterical fear that bands of children were committing crime and mayhem and threatening to destroy society as we know it.

== Plot summary ==
Cythera is set in a near-future Earth following an unsuccessful Third World Children's Crusade against the West, with children being subject to increasing levels of censorship. Filmmaker Flynn has been imprisoned for making the subversive Dahlia Chan films along with his leading lady Jaruwan. Thanks to the increasing power of the Net, sentient 'ghosts' of media images have crossed from Earth 2 to Earth 1, and the novel follows the affair between human Tarquin and Dahlia Chan, their efforts to rescue Jaruwan and their ultimate quest for the freedom of mythical Cythera.

== Reception ==
The reviewer in All Hallows the magazine of the Ghost Story Society treated the book as a modern ghost story. Earth 2 is also called fibrespace. It is the future of the Internet and individuals can be downloaded into this where they become effectively ghosts. Dhalia Chan the B movie actress lives on in fibrespace. However the real actress, called Jaruwan still exists in the real world, or Earth 1:

In a very real sense, Jaruwan is haunted by her doppelgänger, Dahlia. As Jaruwan explains, 'You left me nothing, Dahlia...I had to tell our people not to head West, not to lose their souls like I had.' This is ultimately resolved in a science fictional way, of course, but we would say that Jaruwan gets her soul soul back.
