= Paul Meloy =

English born writer

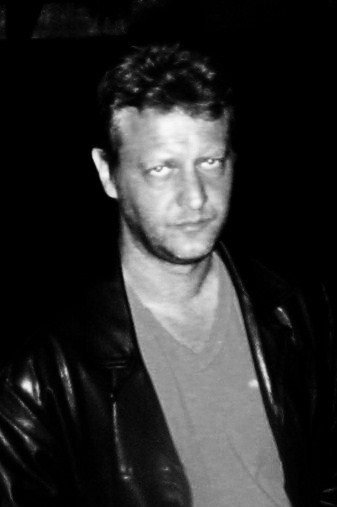
- Born: 1966 (age 59–60); Surrey, England
- Occupations: Psychiatric Nurse & Writer
- Writing career
- Period: Present
- Genres: Horror & Fantasy
- Subject: English Literature

Paul Meloy is an English born writer of what Graham Joyce referred to as "Fractured Realism".

== Biography ==
Meloy was born in 1966 in Surrey, UK. He went to school in Sutton and worked in a variety of mental health settings, institutions and environments with people who have mental health issues or learning disabilities. His writing demonstrates that his work as a mental health professional has influenced his work. He is now married and currently lives in Torquay in Devon, England.

Meloy has a long history with TTA Press, debuting in The Third Alternative #14 with The Last Great Paladin of Idle Conceit. The magazine Black Static, the successor to The Third Alternative, borrowed its name from another Meloy story and in 2008, TTA Press published a critically acclaimed collection of his work, Islington Crocodiles.

Islington Crocodiles is a chronological collection of Meloy's short stories.

== Books ==
- Islington Crocodiles (2008) - ISBN 978-0-9553683-1-8'Montag Press
- Dogs With Their Eyes Shut, novella, PS Publishing, 2013
- The Night Clock, novel, Solaris, 2015.
- Adornments of the Storm, novel, sequel to The Night Clock, Solaris, 2019
- Electric Breakfast, collection, Montag Press, 2022

== Published stories ==
- The Last Great Paladin of Idle Conceit - The Third Alternative #14
- Raiders - The Third Alternative #27
- Care in the Continuum - The Third Alternative #30
- Don't touch the Blackouts - The Third Alternative #34
- Running Away to Join the Town - Nemonymous #5
- Black Static - The Third Alternative #40
- Dying in the arms of Jean Harlow - The Third Alternative #42
- Islington Crocodiles - Interzone #208
- The Vague - Published in British Invasion, an anthology edited by Tim Lebbon
- Visibility down to Zero - published in Killers, an anthology edited by Colin Harvey
- All Mouth - Black Static #6
- Alex and the Toyceivers - Published in Paper Cities: An Anthology of Urban Fantasy, an anthology edited by Ekaterina Sedia
- Electric Breakfast - PS Publishing
- Bullroarer (re-titled "Remember Prosymnus" in Electric Breakfast) (End Of The Line. Anthology ed. by Jonathan Oliver 2010)
- Villanova (House Of Fear. Solaris anthology ed. by Jonathan Oliver 2011)
- The Compartments Of Hell (with Sarah Pinborough Black Static # 2011)
- Carrion Cowboy (Gutshot antho ed. by Conrad Williams 2011)
- Dogs With Their Eyes Shut (novella PS Publishing 2012)
- Night Closures (Novella. Visions Fading Fast edited by Gary McMahon 2012)
- Loose (with Gary Greenwood 2012)
- Driver Error. end of the Road, anthology 2012, Solaris.
- Reclamation Yard. black Static 40, 2014.
- Junction Creature, novella, Islington Crocodiles.
- The Serile, Adam's Ladder, anthology edited by Darren Speegle.
- The Gearbox, Prisms (anthology edited by Darren Speegle).
- Reculver, novella, Creatures anthology edited by David Moore.
- The Loved One, Great British Horror 3, For Those in Peril
- Dirty Black Summer, short story, Electric Breakfast.
- Imprecations from the Vacant Lot, (Forthcoming)
- Their Glory Is Like the Flowers of the Field (Forthcoming)

== Essays ==
When Worlds Collide, Cinema Futura, ed. Mark Morris.

== Awards ==
- 2005 British Fantasy Awards – Best Short Story, "Black Static".
