= Protomatter =

The term protomatter may reference:

- in programming, a Java logging framework
- in cosmology, a theoretical primordial plasma, ylem, in the Big-Bang generation of matter
- in fiction, a substance featuring in the list of Star Trek materials
