= Carole Johnstone =

Scottish horror short story writer

- Education: Glasgow Caledonian University

Carole Johnstone is a Scottish short story writer and novelist.

== Biography ==
Carole Johnstone is from Lanarkshire, Scotland though she spent much of her life in north Essex. Johnstone first published a short story in 2008. Since then she has won a British Fantasy Award in 2014 for her short story Signs of the Times as well as having had numerous nominations. Johnstone has had work published by Titan Books, Tor Macmillan, Simon & Schuster, and many others. She has also written Sherlock Holmes stories for Constable & Robinson. Her work has been selected by Ellen Datlow for the Best of the Best and Best Horror of the Year, by Paula Guran for the Year's Best Dark Fantasy and Horror series and by Salt Publishing for Best British Fantasy. Her work makes a regular appearance on the Locus Recommended Reading List. Her debut novel, Mirrorland (2014), one of the top prized books from the London Book Fair, was described by Stephen King as "dark and devious…beautifully written and plotted with a watchmaker's precision." It has been optioned for television.

She now writes full-time and lives on the Scottish coast in Argyll & Bute.

== Bibliography ==
=== Novel ===
- Mirrorland (2021)

=== Collections ===
- The Bright Day Is Done (2014)

=== Short fiction ===
- "The Morning After" (2008)
- "Sanctuary" (2008)
- "The Discomfort of Words" (2009)
- "Frenzy" (2009)
- "The Blind Man" (2009)
- "Dead Loss" (2009)
- "Scent" (2009)
- "The Invitation" (2010)
- "Stamping Ground" (2010)
- "Between a Rock and a Hard Place" (2010)
- "A Hard Place" (2010)
- "Machine" (2010)
- "Bury the Truth" (2010)
- "Electric Dreams" (2011)
- "The Claife Crier" (2011)
- "The Monster of Venice" (2011)
- "God of the Gaps" (2012)
- "The Pest House" (2012)
- "Sometimes I Get a Good Feeling" (2012)
- "Signs of the Times" (2013)
- "21 Brooklands: Next to Old Western, Opposite the Burnt Out Red Lion" (2013)
- "If You Can Read This, You're Too Close" (2013)
- "Ad Astra" (2013)
- "Departures" (2014)
- "Cold Turkey" (2014)
- "Catching Flies" (2014)
- "Equilibrium" (2014)
- "There You'll Be" (2015)
- "The Draugr of Tromso" (2015)
- "Circa Diem" (2016
- "Wetwork" (2016
- "The Case of the Cannibal Club" (2017)
- "Just" (2017)
- "Better You Believe" (2017)
- "Skyshine, or Death by Scotland" (2017)
- "The Eyes Are White and Quiet" (2017)
- "In the Gallery of Silent Screams" (2018 with Chris Kelso)
- "Skinner Box" (2019)
- "Deep, Fast, Green" (2019)
