= Sarah Anne Langton =

British artist and graphic designer

- Born: Leicestershire
- Occupation: Graphic Designer
- Writing career
- Genres: Fantasy, Science Fiction
- Notable work: Central Station
- Website: secretarcticbase.com

Sarah Anne Langton is a British artist and graphic designer specialising in science fiction and fantasy illustration. She won the 2016 BSFA Award for Best Artwork for her cover of Central Station by Lavie Tidhar, and is a three-times British Fantasy Award nominee for Best Artist.

Langton created the "Pickwick the Dodo" logo for the Hodderscape list of Hodder & Stoughton, and illustrated the 12pp comics New Swabia by Lavie Tidhar (in Outside, Topics Press 2017).

She was a Guest of Honour at the 2017 Bristolcon, an annual SF convention in Bristol.

She is currently contributing graphics for the upcoming Floor 13: Deep State

== Awards ==
- 2018 BSFA Award Best Artwork nominee, for Unholy Land by Lavie Tidhar.
- 2017 Chesley Awards Best Cover Illustration - Paperback or E-book category nominee, for Central Station.
- 2017 British Fantasy Award Best Artist nominee.
- 2016 BSFA Award Best Artwork winner, for Central Station.
- 2016 British Fantasy Award Best Artist nominee.
- 2015 BSFA Award Best Artwork nominee, for Jews vs Zombies edited by Lavie Tidhar and Rebecca Levene.
- 2015 British Fantasy Award Best Artist nominee.
