= Nemonymous =

British experimental fiction publication (2001-10)

First issue cover

Nemonymous was an experimental short fiction publication that labeled itself a "megazanthus" (a portmanteau of magazine and anthology). It was published and edited in the United Kingdom from 2001 to 2010 by D.F. Lewis.

This publication was distinctive in that all stories were published anonymously, with the identities of contributing authors being normally withheld until the following issue, an arrangement intended to temporarily strip the reader of any prejudices surrounding the author's name (including popularity, gender and place of origin), and thus level the playing field for the writer. (Later issues did not follow this exact model.)

== History ==
The first issue of Nemonymous, subtitled A Journal of Parthenogenetic Fiction and Late Labelling, appeared in November 2001, published in what Paul Di Filippo described as a "unique, handsome, perfect-bound format roughly as big as an autoowner manual." Nine issues were published through July 2010. The final four editions were more like books than journals: Zencore (2007), Cone Zero (2008), Cern Zoo (2009) and Null Immortalis (2010).

All stories saw their first publication in Nemonymous. A few notable republications after appearing in Nemonymous: "The Assistant To Dr Jacob" by Eric Schaller and "England and Nowhere" by Tim Nickels were chosen for Year's Best Fantasy and Horror anthologies. "Strange Scenes From an Unfinished Film" by Gary McMahon was chosen for Year's Best Dark Fantasy & Horror. The novelette "The Lion's Den" by Steve Duffy was chosen for The Best Horror of the Year Volume Two edited by Ellen Datlow and The Weird edited by Ann and Jeff VanderMeer and was also a finalist for the 2009 World Fantasy Awards.

Two stories apparently remain anonymous in perpetuo: the influential "Vanishing Life and Films of Emmanuel Escobada" and "George the Baker." Also, Nemonymous Two in 2002 is reputed to have published the world's first blank story. And Nemonymous Six existed only through its non-existence, according to records.

== Critical reception ==
Writing in Asimov's Science Fiction, Paul Di Filippo described the magazine's level of writing as very high, and that Lewis and his cloaked crew were "excavating the purest veins of writing, where only text, not the hype, matters." David Mathew writing for Infinity Plus called Nemonymous "a beautifully produced, sleek and shiny new magazine of short stories: a good thing. And the stories appear with no author's name noted: a brave thing. But it all seems to work: a democracy of prose."

Three different issues of Nemonymous were finalists for the British Fantasy Award for Best Anthology, in 2008, 2009, and 2010. Nemonymous was also a finalist for the same award in 2006 in the category of Best Small Press.

== Authors published ==
Nemonymous released the first short story published by World Fantasy Award winning author Lavie Tidhar ("The Ballerina" in Nemonymous 3). The magazine also published brand new fiction by many other authors including stories by Tony Ballantyne, Rosalind Barden, Keith Brooke, Mike Chinn, Simon Clark, Brendan Connell, Gary Couzens, Jetse de Vries, Lawrence Dyer, Scott Edelman, Paul Evanby, Avital Gad-Cykman, John Grant, A. D. Harvey, Rhys Hughes, Jay Lake, Rachel Kendall, Joel Lane, Bob Lock, Tony Lovell, Gary McMahon, William Meikle, Paul Meloy, Robert Neilson, Reggie Oliver, Monica O'Rourke, Ursula Pflug, Cameron Pierce, Steven Pirie, Joseph S. Pulver, Ekaterina Sedia, Marge Simon, Sarah Singleton, Steve Rasnic Tem, G. W. Thomas, Mark Valentine, Jeff VanderMeer, Neil Williamson, D. Harlan Wilson, A. C. Wise, and Tamar Yellin.

== See also ==
- Science fiction magazine
- Fantasy fiction magazine
- Horror fiction magazine
