= British Fantasy Award for Best Television/Film Production =

Former award for speculative fiction

- Awarded for: A television or film production in the speculative fiction genre
- Country: United Kingdom
- Presented by: British Fantasy Society

Highlights
- Years awarded: 1973–1990, 2009–2022
- Website: britishfantasysociety.org

The British Fantasy Award for Best Television/Film Production was an award given annually as part of the British Fantasy Awards. Under various names, it was awarded intermittently from 1973 until 2022. It was discontinued after the 2022 award season.

== History ==
The award was initially conferred in 1973 as "Best Film". Due to a lack of interest from the award's recipients, it was discontinued after 1990. The award was revived in 2009 for both television and film productions In 2012 and 2013, an award was given for best screenplay; this was discontinued due to screenplays being difficult for the juries to read and acquire. From 2014 onward, the award was given to a film or television episode. From 2016 onwards, multi-part stories, miniseries, and entire seasons became eligible if credited to the same writer(s). The award was discontinued entirely after 2022.

== Winners and shortlist ==
=== Best Film: 1973-1990 ===
* Winners

Year	Director	Work	Ref.
1973	Freddie Francis*	Tales from the Crypt	
1974	John Hough*	The Legend of Hell House	
1975	William Friedkin*	The Exorcist	
1975	René Laloux	Fantastic Planet	
1976	Terry Jones*	Monty Python and the Holy Grail	
1976	Terry Gilliam*	Monty Python and the Holy Grail	
1976	Steven Spielberg	Jaws	
1976	Mel Brooks	Young Frankenstein	
1977	Richard Donner*	The Omen	
1977	Nicolas Roeg	The Man Who Fell to Earth	
1977	Peter Weir	Picnic at Hanging Rock	
1978	Brian De Palma*	Carrie	
1979	Steven Spielberg*	Close Encounters of the Third Kind	
1979	David Cronenberg	Rabid	
1979	Jerzy Skolimowski	The Shout	
1979	George Lucas	Star Wars	
1980	Ridley Scott*	Alien	
1980	Ralph Bakshi	The Lord of the Rings	
1980	George A. Romero	Zombies: Dawn of the Dead	
1981	Irvin Kershner*	The Empire Strikes Back	
1981	Mike Hodges	Flash Gordon	
1981	John Carpenter	The Fog	
1982	Steven Spielberg*	Raiders of the Lost Ark	
1982	John Boorman	Excalibur	
1982	Terry Gilliam	Time Bandits	
1983	Ridley Scott*	Blade Runner	
1983	John Milius	Conan the Barbarian	
1983	Steven Spielberg	E.T. the Extra-Terrestrial	
1984	David Cronenberg*	Videodrome	
1985	Ivan Reitman*	Ghostbusters	
1985	Neil Jordan	The Company of Wolves	
1985	Joe Dante	Gremlins	
1986	Wes Craven*	A Nightmare on Elm Street	
1987	Ridley Scott*	Aliens	
1987	David Cronenberg	The Fly	
1987	Francis Ford Coppola	Peggy Sue Got Married	
1988	Clive Barker*	Hellraiser	
1989	Tim Burton*	Beetlejuice	
1990	Steven Spielberg*	Indiana Jones and the Last Crusade	

=== Best Film, Television, or Screenplay: 2009-2013 ===
Year	Category	Director / Screenwriter	Work	Ref.
2009	Film	Christopher Nolan*	The Dark Knight	
2009	Film	Matt Reeves	Cloverfield	
2009	Film	Frank Darabont	The Mist	
2009	Film	Jon Favreau	Iron Man	
2009	Film	J. A. Bayona	The Orphanage	
2009	Television	Russell T Davies*	Doctor Who	
2009	Television	—N/a	Battlestar Galactica	
2009	Television	—N/a	Supernatural	
2009	Television	—N/a	Dead Set	
2009	Television	—N/a	Dexter	
2010	Film	Tomas Alfredson*	Let The Right One In	
2010	Television	Russell T Davies*	Doctor Who	
2011	Film	Christopher Nolan*	Inception	
2011	Television	—N/a	Sherlock	
2012	Screenplay	Woody Allen*	Midnight in Paris	
2013	Screenplay	Joss Whedon*	The Cabin in the Woods	
2013	Screenplay	Drew Goddard*	The Cabin in the Woods	

=== Best Film/Television Production: 2014-2022 ===
Year	Work	Episode / Season	Ref.
2014	Game of Thrones*	"The Rains of Castamere"	
2014	Gravity	—N/a	
2014	Doctor Who	"The Day of the Doctor"	
2014	Iron Man 3	—N/a	
2014	The Hobbit: The Desolation of Smaug	—N/a	
2015	Guardians of the Galaxy*	—N/a	
2015	Birdman or (The Unexpected Virtue of Ignorance)	—N/a	
2015	Black Mirror	"White Christmas"	
2015	Interstellar	—N/a	
2015	Under the Skin	—N/a	
2016	Jonathan Strange & Mr Norrell*	—N/a	
2016	Inside No. 9	"The Trial of Elizabeth Gadge"	
2016	Jessica Jones	"AKA WWJD?"	
2016	Mad Max: Fury Road	—N/a	
2016	Midwinter of the Spirit	—N/a	
2016	Star Wars: The Force Awakens	—N/a	
2017	Arrival*	—N/a	
2017	Black Mirror	Series 3	
2017	Captain America: Civil War	—N/a	
2017	Deadpool	—N/a	
2017	High-Rise	—N/a	
2018	Get Out*	—N/a	
2018	Black Mirror	Series 4	
2018	The Good Place	Season 1	
2018	Star Wars: The Last Jedi	—N/a	
2018	Stranger Things	Season 2	
2018	Twin Peaks	Season 3	
2018	Wonder Woman	—N/a	
2019	Spider-Man: Into the Spider-Verse*	—N/a	
2019	Annihilation	—N/a	
2019	Avengers: Infinity War	—N/a	
2019	Black Panther	—N/a	
2019	The Haunting of Hill House	—N/a	
2019	Inside No. 9	Series 4	
2020	Us*	—N/a	
2020	Game of Thrones	"The Long Night"	
2020	Watchmen	"It's Summer and We're Running Out of Ice"	
2020	The Witcher	"Rare Species"	
2021	The Boys*	"What I Know"	
2021	Birds of Prey	—N/a	
2021	The Haunting of Bly Manor	"The Romance of Certain Old Clothes"	
2021	The Invisible Man	—N/a	
2021	The Lighthouse	—N/a	
2021	Saint Maud	—N/a	
2022	Last Night in Soho*	—N/a	
2022	Candyman	—N/a	
2022	Dune	—N/a	
2022	The Green Knight	—N/a	
2022	In the Earth	—N/a	
2022	Space Sweepers	—N/a	
