= C. J. Carter-Stephenson =

English writer

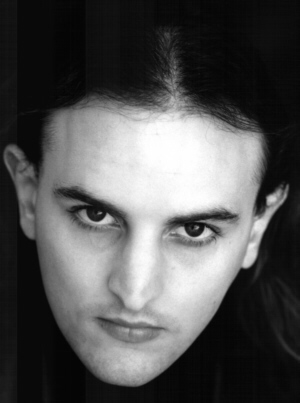

Christian James Carter-Stephenson is an English writer of fiction, poetry and drama. He writes primarily in the genres of horror, science fiction and fantasy. He was born in the county of Essex on 31 January 1977 and attended King Edward VI Grammar School from the ages of 11 to 18. In 1998, he graduated from De Montfort University in Leicester with a BA (Hons) in English and Performing Arts, and in 1999, obtained a postgraduate diploma in Acting from the Academy of Live and Recorded Arts in London. He went on to gain an MA in creative writing from the University of Southampton in 2016 and has been a finalist in the Writers of the Future contest. In 2012, he won a silver award in the Children's Literary Classics award for his children's novel The Crystal Ship.

== Works ==
=== Short stories (print) ===
- "Liquid Memories" published in From the Yonder, Volume 5 - 2025
- "Do You Really Want to Know?" published in Witch Wizard Warlock, August 2023
- "Stranded" published in Dark Moments and Patreon Year Four: A Black Hare Press Anthology, January 2023
- "The Cat's Tale" published in Speculative North, Issue 4 - February 2021
- "The Apparition" published in Frost Zone Zine, Issue 2 - December 2020
- "They Come From Below" published in Insurgence: A Fae Rebellion Anthology, November 2020
- "Freeing the Flames" published in Scary Snippets: A Halloween Microfiction Anthology, October 2019
- "In the Mirror" published in Breaking Bizarro: An Anthology, September 2019
- "The Mind Minder" published in Serial Magazine, Issue 5 - March 2019
- "The Interdimensional Megastar" published in The Colored Lens, Issue 28 - Summer 2018
- "A Space Pirate in Love" published in Daily Flashes of Erotica Quarterly, Issue 1 - January to March 2011
- "Living on Borrowed Time" published in Title Goes Here, Issue 4 - Summer 2010
- "A Costly Wager" published in Mystic Signals, Issue 4 - November 2009
- "Different Worlds" published in The Bracelet Charm, Volume 5, Issue 41 - Fall 2009
- "Kiss of Death" published in Macabre Cadaver, Issue 7 - March/April 2009
- "Meeting Charon" published in Ethereal Tales, Issue 2 - January 2009
- "All I Want for Christmas" (graphic strip with artwork by Mark Chilcott) published in Murky Depths, Issue 6 - December 2008
- "Seeing Spirits" published in Sinister Tales, Volume 3, Issue 2 – Fall 2008
- "They Come From Below" published in Ethereal Tales, Issue 1 - October 2008
- "A Puzzle in the Churchyard" published in The Willows, Volume 2, Issue 1 - May 2008
- "All By Myself" published in Twisted Tongue, Issue 8 – December 2007
- "Into the Pit" published in La Fenêtre, Issue 5 (Reflections) - 2007
- "Love in a Cemetery" published in Sinister Tales, Volume 2, Issue 3 – Fall 2007
- "Destination Earth" published in The Literary Bone, Volume 1, Issue 1 - Summer 2007
- "The Rock Medium" published in Thirteen, Volume 2, Issue 4 - April 2005
- "And Justice For One" published in Seasons in the Night, Volume 4 - March 2005
- "The Gorgon" published in Dark Horizons (the journal of the British Fantasy Society), Issue 46 - Autumn/Winter 2004
- "Of Body and Soul" published in Night to Dawn, Issue 4 - Summer 2004
- "A Tale of the Major Arcana" published in Waxing & Waning, Volume 3, Issue 10 - May/June 2004
- "The Oldest Profession On Earth" published in Scared Naked, Volume 2, Issue 2 - March 2004
- "Picture This" published in Hadrosaur Tales, Volume 17 - 2003
- "Memories" published in Night to Dawn, Issue 3 - Winter 2003
- "The Heart of a King" published in Legend: Worlds of Possibility, Issue 7 - Spring/Summer 2003
- "The Fashion Victim" published in Writer's Muse, Issue 20 - November 2002
- "The Statuette" published in Monas Hieroglyphica, Issue 13 - 2002

=== Short stories (online) ===
- "Stranded" published in Black Hare Press Patreon Monthly Challenge, October 2022
- "Dog Woman" published in Page & Spine: Fiction Showcase, January 2021
- "The Ether Existence" published in The New Accelerator, Volume 2, Issue 9 - February 2019
- "The Decision" published in Jitter, Issue 7 - October 2018
- "The Animal Inside" published in Eastern Iowa Review Dark Fiction, July 2018
- "The Timeless Dance" published in Youth Imagination, Issue 57 - February 2018
- "Through the Eyes of Another" published in the WiFiles, December 2014
- "Hobz Gobbling" published in Bunbury Magazine, Issue 6 - October 2014
- "The Experiment" (graphic strip with artwork by Marcello Abreu & lettering by Brant W. Fowler) published in AE: The Canadian Science Fiction Review, Issue 10 - Spring 2013
- "A Costly Wager" published in Sorcerous Signals, November 2009 to January 2010 (no longer available)
- "Moonlit Rendezvous" published in Lucrezia, March 2009 (no longer available)
- "In Pursuit of a Castle" published in Static Movement, April 2008 (no longer available)

=== Short stories (podcast) ===
- "The Timeless Dance" performed for The Nights End Podcast, Season 2, Episode 1 - January 2021
- "The Last Centurion" performed for Tales of Old, Issue 28 - January 2012

=== Novellas (print) ===
- "The Threat From Within, Part Two" published in Twisted Tongue, Issue 13 – October 2009
- "The Threat From Within, Part One" published in Twisted Tongue, Issue 12 – November 2008

=== Short story collections (print) ===
- "Bloodlust Variations" published by Bonito Books, 2012. ISBN 978-1-4716-5980-5

=== Children's novels (print) ===
- "The Crystal Ship" published by Bonito Books, 2010. ISBN 978-1-4457-1369-4

=== Poetry (print) ===
- "The Leech" published in HWA Poetry Showcase Volume X, November 2023
- "She Talks of the Past, I Think of the Future" published in The Fifth Di..., June 2022
- "The Army of Stone" published in Illumen, Volume 14, Issue 4 - Summer 2018
- "A Walk in the Park" published in Blinking Cursor, Issue 6 - Summer 2011
- "New Shoes" published in Blinking Cursor, Issue 5 - Spring 2011
- "Lost Love" published in The Stray Branch, Volume 2, Issue 5 - Spring/Summer 2010
- "The Souls of Those Lost at Sea" published in Möbius, September 2007
- "House of Dark Dreams" published in Back Roads, Issue 3 - March 2007
- "Vision of the Future" published in Möbius, September 2006
- "The Ritual" published in Harlequin, Issue 11 - 2006
- "The Boat" published in Aesthetica magazine, Issue 9 - March/April 2005
- "The Illusion of Immortality" published in Eclipse, Issue 29 - April 2003

=== Poetry (online) ===
- "Rising Death" published in Little Blue Marble, September 2023
- "The Rise of the Machines" published in Radon Journal, Issue 1 - May 2022
- "Jungle Secrets" published in Utopia Science Fiction, Volume 1, Issue 4 - February 2020
- "Angel or Dragon?" published in Quatrain.Fish, December 2018
- "Insect Inspiration" published in Quatrain.Fish, December 2018
- "Voyage to Nowhere" published in The Fifth Di..., September 2013
- "House of Dark Dreams" published in Dark Metre, Issue 21 - April 2013
- "Creature Once Divine" published in Calenture, Volume 2, Issue 1 - September 2006

=== Plays (print) ===
- "These Lips are Death" published by Bonito Books, 2017. ISBN 978-1-9745-0891-4
- "Michael Steel is Dead" published by New Theatre Publications, 2003. ISBN 1-84094-391-2
