= Neil Ayres =

English writer

Neil George Ayres is an English short fiction writer, born in east London in 1979. He grew up in Tower Hamlets, Essex and Spain.

His fiction includes the literary novel, Nicolo's Gifts, and short speculative fiction published in many international small and independent press publications, including Apex Digest, Electric Velocipede (his story "Sundew" received an honorable mention in the Year's Best Fantasy and Horror 2004), Trunk Stories and online at Infinity Plus, Cabinet des Fees, The Future Fire and Simulacrum.

His non-fiction has appeared in Aesthetica magazine and on LauraHird.com.

Neil has worked for Battersea Dogs' Home, Nature, Time, The Economist and Design Week.

He lives in Surrey with his partner and their dog.

In 2005 he project managed and helped launch Book of Voices: a short story anthology for Sierra Leone PEN, for Flame Books. The collection included stories by award-winning authors such as Patrick Neate, Gregory Norminton, Tanith Lee, and Jeffrey Ford. (Ford's story was reprinted by Ellen Datlow in The Year's Best Fantasy and Horror 2005. Ayres' story What's in the Box, Fox? received an honorable mention from Kelly Link and Gavin J Grant.)

His story, Twenty-One Again, was included in The Elastic Book of Numbers, which won the British Fantasy Society award for best anthology.

The same year he also edited The Minotaur in Pamplona for D-Press, two chapbooks including work by Lavie Tidhar, Rhys Hughes, Brian Aldiss and Catherynne M Valente. Steve Redwood's story, Circe's Choice also received an honorable mention.

In summer 2007 his novelette, Skipping Stones, written with E. Sedia, is to be published as the follow-up to Hal Duncan's premiere chapbook from Jessup Publishing.

Neil maintains a blog with Cambridge-based writer and Macmillan New Writing author Aliya Whiteley.
