= Tony Ballantyne (writer) =

British science-fiction author

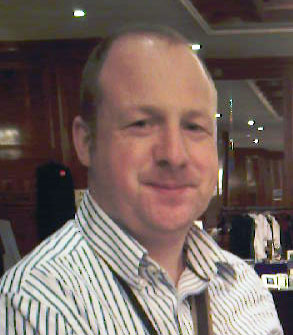
- Born: 1972 (age 53–54); County Durham, UK
- Citizenship: United Kingdom
- Occupations: Writer, teacher
- Writing career
- Genre: Science fiction
- Notable work: Recursion trilogy
- Notable awards: BFSA for Short Fiction
- Website: www.tonyballantyne.com

Tony Ballantyne (born 1972) is a British science fiction author known for his debut trilogy of novels, titled Recursion, Capacity and Divergence. Until July 2025, he was also Assistant Headteacher and an Information Technology teacher at The Blue Coat School, Oldham and has been nominated for the BSFA Award for short fiction.

== Bibliography ==
=== Novels ===
- Dream London, Solaris, 2013
- Dream Paris, Solaris, 2015

==== Recursion Trilogy ====
- Recursion, Macmillan, 2004
- Capacity, Macmillan, 2005
- Divergence, Macmillan, 2007

==== The Robot Wars / Penrose ====
- Twisted Metal, Macmillan, 2009
- Blood and Iron, Macmillan, 2010
- Stories from the Northern Road, Macmillan, 2012

=== Short fiction ===
==== Stories ====
Title	Year	First published	Reprinted/collected	Notes
Takeaway	2009	Ballantyne, Tony (19 March 2009). "Takeaway". Nature. 458 (7236): 376. Bibcode:2009Natur.458..376B. doi:10.1038/458376a.		
The Region of Jennifer	2014	Ballantyne, Tony (June 2014). "The Region of Jennifer". Analog Science Fiction and Fact. 134 (6): 46–56.		
Threshold	2014	Ballantyne, Tony (October 2014). "Threshold". Analog Science Fiction and Fact. 134 (10): 28–42.		
Seeds	2009	We Think Therefore We Are, edited by Peter Crowther (DAW)		
Underbrain	2008	Subterfuge, edited by Ian Whates (Newcon Press)		

- "Why are Rocks?" – Hub Issue 40, edited by Lee Harris
- "Matthew's Passion" (with Eric Brown) – Kethani by Eric Brown (Solaris, 2008)
- "Third Person" – The Solaris Book of New Science Fiction, edited by George Mann (Solaris, 2007); Reprinted in The Year's Best SF 13, edited by David Hartwell and Kathryn Cramer
- "Aristotle OS" – Fast Forward 1, edited by Lou Anders (PYR, 2007); Reprinted in THE YEAR's BEST SF 13, edited by David Hartwell and Kathryn Cramer
- "The Exchange" – Postscripts 7
- "The Robot and the Octopus" – Nemonymous 5
- "A Matter of Mathematics" – The Mammoth Book of Jules Verne Adventures, edited by Mike Ashley and Eric Brown
- "Star!" – Constellations, edited by Peter Crowther (DAW, 2005)
- "The Ugly Truth" – Interzone 191
- "The Waters of Meribah" – Interzone189; Reprinted in THE YEAR's BEST SF 9, edited by David Hartwell and Kathryn Cramer
- "Teaching the War Robot to Dance" – Interzone 178
- "Real Man" – Interzone 174
- "Indecisive Weapons" – Interzone 172
- "Restoring the Balance, 2" – Interzone 168
- "Restoring the Balance" – Interzone 167
- "A New Beginning" – Interzone 163
- "Single Minded" – Interzone 162
- "The Blue Magnolia" – The Third Alternative 22; Reprinted in the Mammoth Book of Comic Fantasy, edited by Mike Ashley
- "Soldier.exe" – Interzone 144
- "Gorillagram" – Interzone 139
- "The Sixth VNM" – Interzone 138
