= Dead Boys (novel) =

1994 novel by Richard Calder

- Author: Richard Calder
- Cover artist: Larry Rostant
- Language: English
- Series: Dead
- Genre: Science fiction
- Publisher: HarperCollins
- Publication date: 1994
- Publication place: United Kingdom
- Media type: Print (Paperback)
- Pages: 199
- ISBN: 0-586-21456-9
- OCLC: 32204536
- Preceded by: Dead Girls
- Followed by: Dead Things

Dead Boys is a science fiction novel by British writer Richard Calder, first published in 1994.

The novel is the second in Calders 'Dead' trilogy, and is set six months after the events described in the novel Dead Girls.

== Synopsis and influences ==
Richard Calder declared:

I was certainly influenced by the New Wave...The idea, for instance, that SF could go anywhere and appropriate the stylistic and cultural concerns of writers like William Burroughs...In other words, the New Wave encouraged a belief that SF could be radical and experimental literature.

== Reception ==
Calder declared about his novels:

There are those who enthusiastically embrace them, and there are those who regard them with an unremitting enmity about that. I am philosophical about that.

A reviewer for Kirkus Reviews wrote that this book is:

A thoroughly unpleasant piece of business

The review in Publishers Weekly stated:

At the heart of the novel lies a critique of Western capitalism and sexual politics, of how they dehumanize and homogenize all they touch. But it is often difficult to see this point for the prose. Calder's penchant for allusive wordplay redolent with references to B-movies and other SF stories produces scintillating dialogue, but it deteriorates into obfuscatory self-indulgence when characters are left alone to ruminate on their fates, or on the universe's entropic decline.
