= Peeping Tom (magazine) =

British small press magazine

Peeping Tom was a British small press magazine that existed between 1990 and 2000.

== History and profile ==
Peeping Tom was launched in 1990. It was initially published by David Bell and edited by Hubert Ticklebottom (they later swapped roles). The magazine was published on a quarterly basis. The headquarters was in Leicestershire. It specialised in dark fantasy and horror, featuring such British authors as Joel Lane, Ian Watson, Derek Fox, D F Lewis, Nicholas Royle, Stephen Laws, Ramsey Campbell and Peter Tennant, as well as artwork by Dallas Goffin, Madeleine Finnegan, Chico Kidd, Gerald Gaubert and others. It received the British Fantasy Society Award for "best small press" in both 1992 and 1993. The magazine ran for a total of 34 issues and ceased publication in June 2000.
