= Something Wicked (magazine) =

- First issue cover
- Editor: Joe Vaz
- Categories: Science fiction magazine, Horror
- Frequency: Quarterly
- First issue: Spring 2006
- Final issue: July 2011
- Company: Inkless Media Publishing
- Country: South Africa
- Language: English
- Website: Something Wicked

Something Wicked was a quarterly horror, science fiction, and fantasy print magazine published in South Africa by InklessMedia Publishing. The magazine was founded by Joe Vaz in 2006. Their first issue was published in the Spring of 2006. In July, 2011, it switched to a monthly online format.
