= Richard Calder (writer) =

British science fiction writer

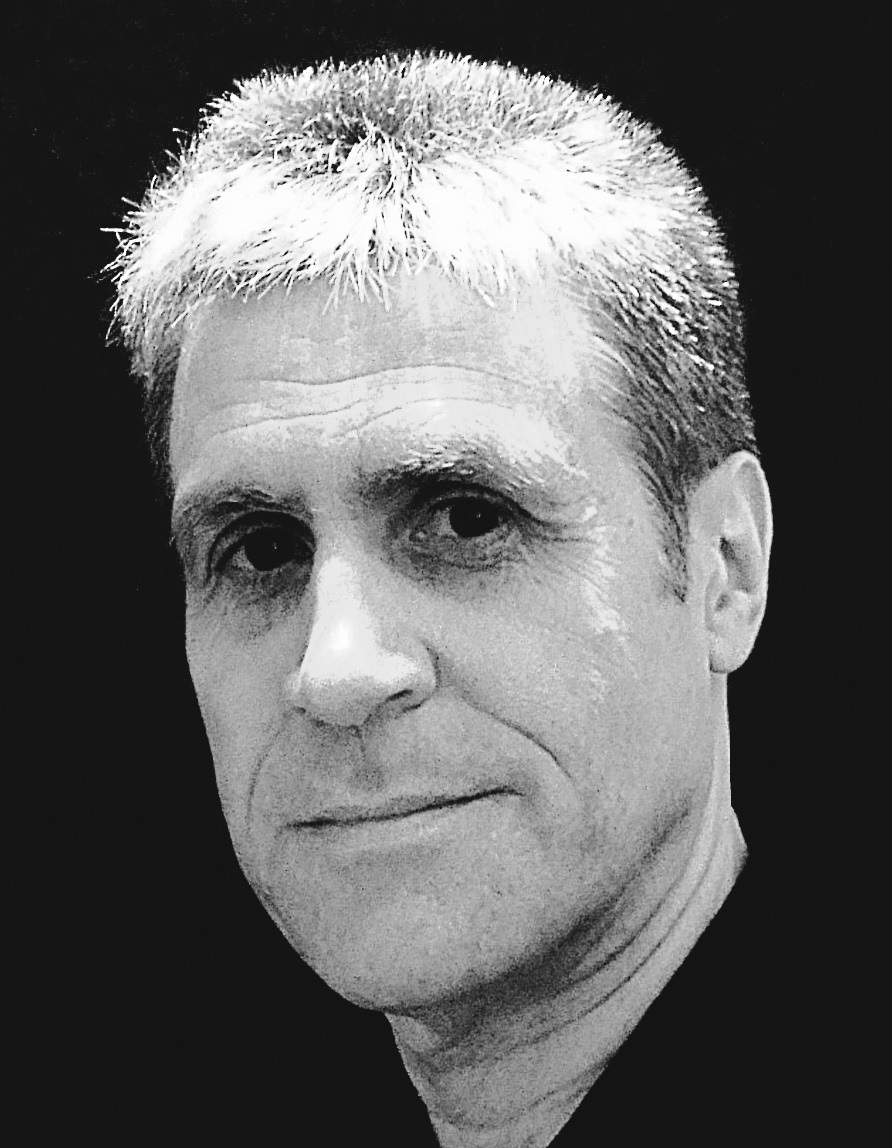
- Calder in 2006
- Born: 1956 (age 69–70); London
- Education: University of Sussex
- Occupation: Writer
- Writing career
- Genre: Postcyberpunk science fiction

Richard Calder (born 1956) is a British science fiction writer who lives and works in the East End of London. He previously spent over a decade in Thailand (1990–1997) and the Philippines (1999–2002).

== Writing career ==
Born in London, Calder began publishing stories in 1989, and first came to wider notice with the postcyberpunk novel Dead Girls (1992). Dead Girls was expanded into a trilogy; the other volumes are Dead Boys and Dead Things.

Since 1992, he has produced a further nine novels, and about twenty short stories. A theme running through his work (such as in the 'Dead' trilogy) is agalmatophiliac male lust for young female gynoids, as well as the darker undercurrents of British national culture. His novels and stories have links and plot overlaps between one another, and together form a mythos.

He cites as inspirations Angela Carter and Georges Bataille, among others.

He was interviewed in the magazine Interzone in August 2001 about the theme of escape and his own attempts to break away from "the physical and psychological constraints of the cloying suburbia of his childhood." He said:

The quest for metaphysical, or psychological homeland you mention, a place of fulfilment seems to end, for my heroes and heroines, in a debacle often involving some apocalyptic rendering of the world. But they do seem to discover something more important than the prospect of mind-blowing, Wagnerian transformation. And that something is tenderness.

In 2004 Dead Girls was under option to an Australian film production company. Calder was commissioned to draft a screenplay. When the film did not materialise he got the idea to re-imagine the book as a graphic novel. This was published in 2014. It is illustrated by Filipino artist Leonardo M Giron, who was introduced to Richard Calder by Terry Martin, the editor of the quarterly magazine Murky Depths. The graphic novel was originally serialised in Murky Depths.

== Bibliography ==
- Calder, Richard (1993). Dead Girls. London: HarperCollins. ISBN 0-00-224154-4.
- Calder, Richard (1994). Dead Boys. London: HarperCollins. ISBN 0-586-21456-9.
- Calder, Richard (1996). Dead Things. London: HarperCollins. ISBN 0-00-648040-3.
- Calder, Richard (1998). Cythera. London: Orbit. ISBN 1-85723-533-9.
- Calder, Richard (1998). Frenzetta. London: Orbit. ISBN 1-85723-683-1.
- Calder, Richard (1999). The Twist. Simon & Schuster (Trade Division). ISBN 0-671-03719-6.
- Calder, Richard (2000). Malignos. Earthlight Press. ISBN 0-671-03720-X.
- Calder, Richard (2001). Impakto. London: Earthlight. ISBN 0-7434-0895-0.
- Calder, Richard (2002). Lord Soho. London: Earthlight. ISBN 0-7434-0896-9. (A "time opera" consisting of novellas which originally appeared in Interzone, based on the plots of operas, including Turandot, The Marriage of Figaro and La Traviata)
- Calder, Richard (2005). Babylon. PS Publishing. ISBN 1-904619-58-4.
- Calder, Richard & Giron, Leonardo M (2011). Dead Girls, Act 1 - The Last of England. Lincolnshire: The House of Murky Depths. ISBN 978-1-906584-22-1.
- Calder, Richard & Giron, Leonardo M (2014). Dead Girls the Graphic Novel. Murky Depths. ISBN 978-1-906584-59-7.

== Short stories ==
Calder's short stories have been published almost exclusively by Interzone. They are:

- "Toxine" in Interzone - The 4th Anthology. Paperback edition 1990 New English Library ISBN 0-450-53120-1
- "Mosquito" in Interzone #32, November/December 1989, reprinted in Omni July 1990 and Interzone - The 5th Anthology, 1991
- "The Lilim" in Interzone #34, March/April 1990
- "The Allure" in Interzone #40, October 1990, reprinted in The Best of Interzone, 1997
- "The Embarkation for Cythera" in Interzone #106, Apr 1996
- "Lost in Cathay" in Leviathan #2, The Ministry of Whimsy, 1998
- "Malignos" in Interzone #144, June 1999, nominated for BSFA Award
- "Impakto" in Interzone #150, December 1999, nominated for International Horror Guild Award
- "Lord Soho" in Interzone #154, April 2000
- "Incunabula" in Interzone #159, September 2000
- "The Lady of the Carnelias" in Interzone #161, November 2000
- "The Nephilim" in Interzone #164, February 2001
- "Roach Motel" in Interzone #166, April 2001
- "Espiritu Santo" in Interzone #170, August 2001
- "Zarzuela" in Interzone #178, April 2002
- "The Dark" in Interzone #181, August 2002
- "The Catgirl Manifesto: An Introduction" in Album Zutique #1, May 2003 (as 'Christina Flook'), 2003 James Tiptree, Jr. Award Short List, reprinted in The James Tiptree Award Anthology 1, Tachyon Publications, 2005 Stabat Mater Lost Pages, 2003
- "Female Hyper-Orgasmic Epilepsy ('Black Orgasm')" and "The Ophidian Manifesto, or How I Met Dr Thackery" in The Thackery T. Lambshead Pocket Guide to Eccentric & Discredited Diseases, The Ministry of Whimsy, 2003
- "After the Party" in Interzone #201, December 2005, #202, February 2006, #203, April 2006
