= Dead Girls (novel) =

1992 novel by Richard Calder

- Author: Richard Calder
- Language: English
- Series: 'Dead' trilogy
- Genre: Science fiction
- Publisher: HarperCollins
- Publication date: 1992 and 2014
- Publication place: United Kingdom
- Media type: Print (Hardback & Paperback & Graphic Novel)
- Pages: 208
- ISBN: 978-1906584597
- OCLC: 28446528
- Followed by: Dead Boys

Dead Girls is a science fiction novel by British author Richard Calder, first published in the UK in 1992 (HarperCollins) and 1995 in the US (St Martin's Press). It was his début novel.

Dead Girls tells the tale of a virus that turns pubescent girls into vampiric gynoid dolls called Lilim, and the doomed love affair between 15-year-old Ignatz Zwakh and a Lilim assassin called Primavera. The novel is the first in Calders 'Dead' trilogy, and is followed by the novels Dead Boys and Dead Things.

== Background ==
The novel was written in 1990, soon after Richard Calder had taken up residence in Thailand. He was living in Nong Khai, a small town on the Mekong overlooking Laos. He was also making frequent trips to Bangkok.

The idea for the quantum clockwork Cartier dolls comes from the story of Coppélia, a mechanical doll in one of The Tales of Hoffmann. Richard Calder cites Jacques Offenbach's opera version of the tale in which Hoffmann falls in love with Olympia as being particularly influential.

== Plot ==
Ignatz Zwakh, 15-year-old former escort of vampiric assassin Primavera Bobinski, is tracked down in Thailand with a demand from Primavera's boss Madame Kito that Ignatz return to the Big Weird to work with Primavera.

Ignatz returns to Nana, Bangkok, and is reunited with Primavera. They go to a restaurant on a job from Madame Kito, but are captured and taken by Jack Morgenstern to the American Embassy.

Jack Morgenstern reveals that the British government want Primavera and Ignatz returned to them, and Kito has betrayed them to the Americans. Morgenstern reveals that several other assassins have escaped from London and believes that one of the original dolls called Titania is organising the breakouts. Primavera and Ignatz escape by jumping into the river below. Primavera discovers that her body has been infected by hostile nanobots which are slowly destroying her.

Primavera believes that Kito has been blackmailed into betraying them. They gain entrance to Kito's penthouse in the Grace Hotel, only to be captured by Kito and her robot guards. Primavera begs Kito to remove the nanovirus that is killing her. After hearing Primavera's tragic backstory, Kito agrees to have her research and development technician Spalanzani remove the nanomachines.

Jack Morgenstern and his assistants the Pikadon Twins enter Spalanzani's workshop: having bugged it, Morgenstern has heard the whole story. Morgenstern instructs his men to take Primavera but a green light explodes from her and all present are sucked inside Primavera's quantum matrix.

Inside the matrix they find "Dr Toxicophilous," the program that controls their files. Dr. Toxicophilous gives Ignatz the key to Primavera's matrix, he inserts it into her umbilical and the dreamers are returned to the reality of Spalanzani's workshop.

Spalanzani is killed when he tries to stop Morgenstern shooting Primavera. Kito re-hires Primavera and Ignatz to work for her. Kito, Primavera and Ignatz find themselves on the run from the Pikadon Twins and Jack Morgenstern.

Kito takes Primavera and Ignatz to meet Mosquito, an old employee, to ask for money. Back on the road, Ignatz and Primavera are attacked by the Pikadon Twins, and though they manage to kill them they lose Kito in the process.

Ignatz and Primavera try to escape down the Mekong river, but Primavera collapses as she gives in to the virus. It is revealed that the only way the Lilim can survive is by keeping their numbers under control. Primavera dies.

== Adaptations ==
Richard Calder and Leonardo M. Giron have turned Dead Girls into a graphic novel. This was published in 2014. Act 1 - The Last of England was serialised in Murky Depths #9 to #12 and collected in a limited edition full-colour hardback (published January, 2011) by the imprint The House of Murky Depths. Act 2 began in Murky Depths #16 (Summer, 2011). There are no plans to make graphic novels of the rest of the Dead series, but an eight-comic series launched in March 2012 to replace the serialisation that was cut short with the demise of Murky Depths with issue #18. An Indiegogo crowd funding campaign had been instigated by publisher House of Murky Depths to produce the 208-page trade paperback graphic novel.

Dead Girls has been adapted into German Radio Drama Tote Mädchen and broadcast on Norddeutscher Rundfunk in 2014. It stars Janina Stopper as Primavera and Maximilian Mauff as Iggy.

== Reception ==
Kirkus Reviews described the novel as:

Wild, daring, confused, brash, pyrotechnic, but with some fascinating ideas bubbling up: an intriguing and encouraging debut.
