= Dave Carson =

Northern Irish artist and illustrator (born 1955)

Dave Carson (born 1955) is a Northern Ireland-born artist and novel illustrator.

== Career ==
Carson has been presented with five British Fantasy Awards for Best Artist during more than twenty years of illustration. He is most famous for his illustrations in H. P. Lovecraft's novels, and his work for Games Workshop.

His role-playing game artwork includes Call of Cthulhu, Palladium Fantasy, Nightbane and Beyond the Supernatural.

Carson provided illustrations for The Clock of Dreams (1978) and the Fighting Fantasy gamebook Beneath Nightmare Castle (1987). He contributed artwork to the H. P. Lovecraft anthology Shadows Over Innsmouth.
