= Murky Depths =

British Horror and Science fiction magazine

- Editor: Terry Martin (publisher)
- Categories: Science fiction/horror anthology magazine
- Frequency: Quarterly
- Publisher: The House of Murky Depths
- First issue: September 2007
- Final issue: October 2011
- Country: United Kingdom
- ISSN: 1752-5586

Murky Depths bylined as "The Quarterly Anthology of Graphically Dark Speculative Fiction" was a British horror and science fiction magazine which began publishing in 2007. The magazine editor-in-chief was Terry Martin and the editor was Anne Stringer. The magazine was published four times a year. It blended illustrated prose short stories with comic strips. Since Issue #3 it featured a gloss laminated card cover, whereas Issue #1 and #2 covers were on the same paper stock as the contents. From Issue #7 the cover artwork had been wraparound. Its size was unusual for a magazine, being American comic book or graphic novel format. Murky Depths received the British Fantasy Awards Best Magazine/Periodical in 2010 and shortlisted for the same award in 2011.

The last issue of Murky Depths was published in October 2011 but the publishers, The House of Murky Depths (based in the village of Fosdyke in South Lincolnshire, according to Yell.com), continue to sell back issues.

== Issues ==
- Murky Depths Issue #1 – September, 2007 – ISBN 978-1-906584-01-6
- Murky Depths Issue #2 – December, 2007 – ISBN 978-1-906584-02-3
- Murky Depths Issue #3 – March, 2008 – ISBN 978-1-906584-03-0
- Murky Depths Issue #4 – June, 2008 – ISBN 978-1-906584-04-7
- Murky Depths Issue #5 – September, 2008 – ISBN 978-1-906584-05-4
- Murky Depths Issue #6 – Winter, 2008 – ISBN 978-1-906584-10-8
- Murky Depths Issue #7 – Spring, 2009 – ISBN 978-1-906584-11-5
- Murky Depths Issue #8 – Summer, 2009 – ISBN 978-1-906584-12-2
- Murky Depths Issue #9 – Autumn, 2009 – ISBN 978-1-906584-14-6
- Murky Depths Issue #10 – Winter, 2009 – ISBN 978-1-906584-15-3
- Murky Depths Issue #11 – Spring, 2010 – ISBN 978-1-906584-18-4
- Murky Depths Issue #12 – Summer, 2010 – ISBN 978-1-906584-20-7
- Murky Depths Issue #13 – Autumn, 2010 – ISBN 978-1-906584-21-4
- Murky Depths Issue #14 – Winter, 2010 – ISBN 978-1-906584-23-8
- Murky Depths Issue #15 – Spring, 2011 – ISBN 978-1-906584-25-2
- Murky Depths Issue #16 – Summer, 2011 – ISBN 978-1-906584-26-9
- Murky Depths Issue #17 – Autumn, 2011 (print error: Summer, 2011 on back cover) – ISBN 978-1-906584-28-3
- Murky Depths Issue #18 – Winter, 2011 – ISBN 978-1-906584-29-0

== Contributing writers ==
Authors published by Murky Depths included Robert Rankin, Jon Courtenay Grimwood, Stan Nicholls, Sam Stone, Eugie Foster, Richard Calder, Edward Morris, Edward M. Erdelac, Chris Huff, Matt Wallace, R. D. Hall, Mike Carey, Juliet E. McKenna, C. J. Carter-Stephenson and Lavie Tidhar. A comprehensive list is available at the Murky Depths website.

== Cover artists ==
Murky Depths cover artists included Les Edwards, Edward Miller, Steve Stone, Richard Calder, Chris Moore and Geoff Taylor. A comprehensive list is available at the Murky Depths website.

== Comic artists ==
Murky Depths comic strip artists included Robert Rankin, Luke Cooper, David Ryan, Lucas Hinchley, Richard Calder, Leonardo M. Giron and Neil Roberts. A comprehensive list is available at the Murky Depths website.

== Story illustrators ==
Murky Depths story illustrators included Nancy Farmer, Ed Norden, Jason Beam, Glen James, James Fletcher, Mark Bell and Nathaniel Milljour. A comprehensive list is available at the Murky Depths website.

== Awards ==
- Voted Best Magazine/Periodical in the British Fantasy Awards 2010
- Cover of Issue #4 by Vincent Chong shortlisted for BSFA Best Artwork 2008
- "Looking in Looking Out" by Martin Deep nominated for BSFA Best Artwork 2007
- Shortlisted for Best Magazine/Periodical in the British Fantasy Awards 2011
