= Samantha Lee Howe =

British writer

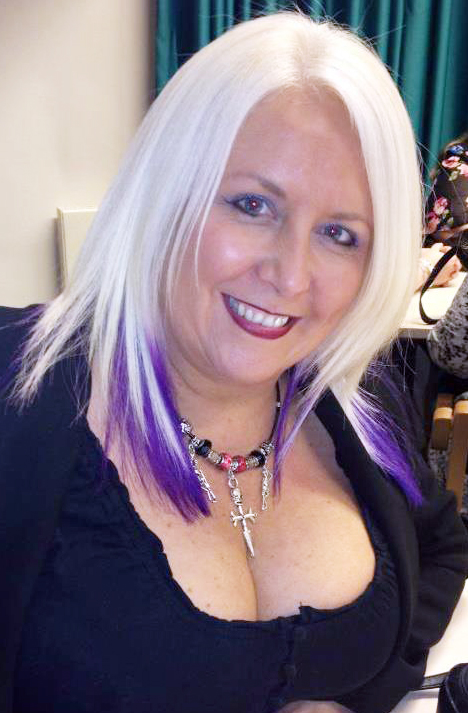
- Born: Samantha Lee Harrison Manchester, England
- Occupation: Novelist; editor; screenwriter; short story writer
- Genre: Gothic; horror; fantasy; steampunk; crime; thriller
- Notable works: The Stranger In Our Bed; House of Killers trilogy; Vampire Gene series; Jinx Chronicles series
- Spouse: David J. Howe (m. 2015)

Website
- samanthaleehowe.co.uk

Samantha Lee Howe (née Harrison) is a British novelist and screenwriter. She writes horror and fantasy under the pen name Sam Stone. She is best known for her 2020 psychological thriller novel The Stranger in Our Bed, published by HarperCollins imprint One More Chapter. Howe is the commissioning editor of Telos Publishing imprint Telos Moonrise.

== Early life and education ==
The youngest of seven children, Howe was born Samantha Lee Harrison in Manchester, England, which forms the partial backdrop of her novel Killing Kiss and is the common location of the Vampire Gene series. In a recent interview with The Daily Express, Howe admitted that her father was abusive and that she was also in an unhappy first marriage because of Domestic violence. As a result, Howe is now a Survivor Ambassador for Yorkshire charity Independent Domestic Abuse Services also known as IDAS. Despite this difficult start, she graduated with a BA (Hons) in English and Writing for Performance at University of Bolton, a PGCE at Manchester University and her MA in Creative Writing also at Bolton. Her eventual first novel, Gabriele Caccini, was originally written as her dissertation. Stone worked as an English teacher at St Christopher's Church of England High School, Accrington until 2007, where she decided to leave her position after it was discovered that she was the author of Gabriele Caccini, which she had written under the pen name of Paigan Stone.

== Career ==
Howe's debut novel, Gabriele Caccini – published under her original pen name, Paigan Stone – was recognized by Foreword Reviews, an American literary magazine specializing in reviewing books from independent publishers, at its Book of the Year Awards with its Silver Award in Horror for 2007. She was shortlisted for the August Derleth Award for Best Novel in the British Fantasy Awards for her second novel, Futile Flame. This book was also a 2009 finalist in the ForeWord Book of the Year Awards.

The third book in the series, Demon Dance, was a finalist for the 2010 Foreword awards and won the August Derleth Award for Best Novel in the British Fantasy Awards 2011. This made Stone the first female writer to win the August Derleth Award since Tanith Lee did so in 1980. However, after the award results were announced, there was controversy over the voting (due to scrutiny garnered from her partner David J Howe's position as Chairman of the Society, relative to both her nomination and the nomination of books from his publishing company Telos Publishing, as well as an incident where one of the awards presenters opted to promote their Telos-published autobiography during proceedings) and amidst this, Stone publicly returned the Award three days after the results announcement, stating that "The society means too much to me and I cannot allow this controversy to taint the integrity of those involved." The BFS initially declared that the voting was valid, but then in a later statement announced that the Best Novel would be declared a 'No Award' for that year, owing to Stone's return of the award and Howe's resignation (though, the BFS were clear that no evidence was found of any corruption from Howe in his position). She also won the Best Short Story Award in the British Fantasy Awards in the same year, which - after initial confusion for the BFS - was confirmed as an award that she did not return amidst the controversy.

In August 2012 Telos Publishing issued a press release announcing the forthcoming audio of Sam Stone's horror collection, Zombies In New York. Telos also published her Steampunk/horror novella Zombies at Tiffany's.

Gabriele Caccini was re-edited and re-released as Killing Kiss under the pen name Sam Stone in September 2008 by The House of Murky Depths. Writer Tanith Lee gave a quote for the back of the book which said : "A deceptively readable date with darkness – watch your step! This book is lit for the much more discerning chick (and cock) who likes to walk in the shadows. Relax with it, but be prepared for sudden jewels and little masterpieces – and the rug to be pulled from under your feet."

Howe went on to write a further four titles in the Vampire Gene series: Futile Flame, Demon Dance, Hateful Heart and Silent Sand. She then moved to Telos Publishing for reprints of the series and the first print of the sixth novel, Jaded Jewel.

In 2011 a short story collection, Zombies in New York and Other Bloody Jottings, was published by Telos Publishing. The collection was later picked up in October 2012 by AudioGo.

In 2013 it was announced that Howe, writing still as Sam Stone was involved as a screenwriter for a Doctor Who spin-off film; White Witch of Devil's End was released on 13 November 2017 on DVD as part of "The Daemons of Devil's End" boxset by Reeltime Pictures.

In May 2015 Stone became host of her own radio show, The Stone Tapes, on Lincolnshire radio station SirenRadio In the June 2016 edition of Locus Magazine, it was announced that Stone had sold a new novel, Posing for Picasso, to Kevin J Anderson at Wordfire Press. The book went to print in January 2018.

In 2020, she published a psychological thriller novel entitled The Stranger in Our Bed published in February 2020 by HarperCollins imprint One More Chapter. It hit the number one slot in the USA Today book charts. The novel was adapted into a film by production company Buffalo Dragon, The film, directed by Giles Alderson and starring Samantha Bond, Emily Berrington, Ben Lloyd-Hughes, Joseph Marcell, Nina Wadia, Bart Edwards and Terri Dwyer, was released on 1 July 2022 on Showtime Networks. Samantha has since sold three more books to HarperCollins One More Chapter and all three were published in 2021 as The House of Killers Trilogy which consists of The House of Killers Book 1, Kill or Die Book 2, and Kill A Spy Book 3.

In 2022, Howe edited a charity anthology for Telos Publishing in aid of advocacy charity POhWER. The anthology, Criminal Pursuits: Crimes Through Time, was submitted to the Crime Writer's Association for consideration for the CWA Short Story Dagger and six stories from the 14 included were longlisted, three of which made the shortlist resulting in Flesh of a Fancy Woman written by Paul Magrs and featured in the anthology, going on to win this prestigious award.

== Awards and nominations ==
Gabriele Caccini

- 2007 ForeWord Magazine Book of Year Awards - Silver Award Winner for Best Horror Novel

Futile Flame

- 2009 Foreword Magazine Book of the Year Awards - Finalist for Horror [joint acknowledgement with four other finalist books]
- 2010 British Fantasy Award finalist

Demon Dance

- 2010 ForeWord Magazine Book of Year Awards - Finalist for Horror [joint acknowledgment with two other finalist books]
- 2011 British Fantasy Society Awards - Winner – Best Novel

Fool's Gold (from The Bitten Word, ed. Ian Whates)

- 2011 British Fantasy Society Awards - Winner - Best Short Story

The Stranger In Our Bed

- 2023 National Film Awards - Winner - BEST THRILLER [SPONSORED BY IVY NICHE]
- Rio De Janeiro World Film Festival - Winner - BEST WRITER (Summer 2023 edition)
- Milan Filmmaker Awards - Winner- BEST SCRIPT (Fall 2023 edition)
- Paris Lady MovieMakers Festival: Winner - BEST FEMALE FEATURE FILM WRITER & Winner - BEST SCRIPT WRITER (October 2023 edition)
- Austin International Art Festival: Winner - BEST SCRIPT IN A FEATURE FILM (November 2023 edition)
- Best Indie Film Awards Festival: Winner - BEST THRILLER SCREENPLAY (Winter 2023 edition)
- Edinburgh (Note: Also variably spelt as Edinburg Awards in their marketing materials, logo and website URL.) Film Awards: Winner - BEST ADAPTED SCREENPLAY (Winter 2024 edition)
- Chicago Script Awards: Honorable Mention - BEST THRILLER SCREENPLAY (Winter 2024 edition)
- 8 and Halfilm Awards: Winner - BEST FEATURE SCRIPT & Winner - BEST ORIGINAL WRITER

Within Her Walls

- The Script Awards Los Angeles - Winner - BEST BOOK (September 2023 edition)

The House of Killers

- 8 and Halfilm Awards: Winner - BEST BOOK

== Writing credits ==
=== Novels, novellas and collections ===
- Gabriele Caccini (January 2007) - AuthorHouse; later reworked in September 2008 by The House of Murky Depths and republished as Killing Kiss [Book One of Vampire Gene] (as Paigan Stone; republished as Sam Stone) - ISBN 978-1-4259-6656-0 & ISBN 978-1-906584-07-8
- Futile Flame (June 2009) - The House of Murky Depths; later republished August 2015 by Telos Publishing [Book Two of Vampire Gene] (as Sam Stone) - ISBN 978-1-906584-08-5
- Demon Dance (September 2010) - The House of Murky Depths; later republished September 2015 by Telos Publishing [Book Three of Vampire Gene] (as Sam Stone) - ISBN 978-1-906584-09-2
- Hateful Heart (September 2011) - The House of Murky Depths; later republished September 2015 by Telos Publishing [Book Four of Vampire Gene] (as Sam Stone) - ISBN 978-1-906584-27-6
- Zombies At Tiffany's (September 2012) - Telos Publishing [Book One of Kat Lightfoot] (as Sam Stone) - ISBN 978-1-84583-072-4
- Kat on a Hot Tin Airship (August 2013) - Telos Publishing [Book Two of Kat Lightfoot] (as Sam Stone) - ISBN 978-1-84583-086-1
- The Darkness Within – Final Cut (February 2014) - Telos Publishing (as Sam Stone) - ISBN 978-1-84583-874-4
- What's Dead Pussycat (August 2014) - Telos Publishing [Book Three of Kat Lightfoot] (as Sam Stone) - ISBN 978-1-84583-098-4
- Jinx Town (February 2015) - Telos Publishing [Book One of The Jinx Chronicles] (as Sam Stone) – ISBN 978-1-84583-096-0
- Kat of Green Tentacles (August 2015) - Telos Publishing [Book Four of Kat Lightfoot] (as Sam Stone)- ISBN 978-1-84583-099-1
- Silent Sand (October 2015) - Telos Publishing [Book Five of Vampire Gene] (as Sam Stone) - ISBN 978-1-906584-41-2
- Jaded Jewel (May 2016) - Telos Publishing [Book Six of Vampire Gene] (as Sam Stone) - ISBN 978-1-84583-918-5
- Jinx Magic (May 2016) - Telos Publishing [Book Two of The Jinx Chronicles] (as Sam Stone) - ISBN 978-1-84583-111-0
- Kat and the Pendulum (November 2016) - Telos Publishing [Book Five of Kat Lightfoot] (as Sam Stone) - ISBN 978-1-84583-117-2
- Posing For Picasso (January 2018) - Wordfire Press; later republished in November 2022 by SLH Ltd (as Sam Stone) - ISBN 979-8781931200 & ISBN 978-1614756224
- Jinx Bound (July 2018) - Telos Publishing [Book Three of The Jinx Chronicles] (as Sam Stone) - ISBN 978-1-84583-971-0
- Ten Little Demons (November 2018) - Telos Publishing [Book Six of Kat Lightfoot] (as Sam Stone) - ISBN 978-1-84583-129-5
- The Stranger In Our Bed (February 2020) - One More Chapter (as Samantha Lee Howe) - ISBN 978-0008374587
- The House of Killers (March 2021) - One More Chapter [Book One of The House of Killers] (as Samantha Lee Howe) - ISBN 978-0008444570
- Kill Or Die (May 2021) - One More Chapter [Book Two of The House of Killers] (as Samantha Lee Howe) - ISBN 978-0008444617
- Kill A Spy (July 2021) - One More Chapter [Book Three of The House of Killers] (as Samantha Lee Howe) - ISBN 978-0008444594
- The Soul Thief (December 2024) - One More Chapter (as S. L. Howe) - ISBN 9780008695811

Collections

- Crimes of Passion - Telos Publishing ISBN 978-1-84583-225-4 Nov 2023
- Legends of Cthulhu and Other Nightmares - Telos Publishing ISBN 978-1-84583-134-9 Oct 2019
- The Complete Lightfoot - Limited Hardback of All Kat Lightfoot Tales - Telos Publishing ISBN 978-1-84583-131-8 Jan 2019
- Cthulhu and Other Monsters - Collection of Lovecraftian and other tales - Telos Publishing ISBN 978-1-84583-122-6
- Zombies in New York & Other Bloody Jottings – Collection of stories and poetry – Telos Publishing ISBN 978-1-84583-055-7

=== Audio ===
- Freya The Confessions of Dorian Gray Season 4 - Big Finish November 2015
- Zombies at Tiffany's – Spokenworld Audio October 2013
- The Darkness Within – AudioGo – October 2013.
- Zombies in New York and Other Bloody Jottings – AudioGo ISBN 978-1-47131-940-2 October 2012.

=== Screenwriting ===
Samantha Lee Howe

- House of Killer - Pilot
- The Stranger in Our Bed - Buffalo Dragon - Release in USA on Showtime 1 July 2022

Sam Stone

- The White Witch of Devil's End – Reeltime Pictures – Release in Nov 2017 as DVD 6 part Drama.

=== Short stories ===
Samantha Lee Howe

- Gwen - ( As S L Howe) Short Fiction Contribution "Terror Tales of the West Country" Telos Publishing Oct 2022
- Trophy Wife - Short Fiction Contribution "Black in the Night" Titan Books Oct 2022
- Slash - Short Fiction Contribution "Criminal Pursuits: Crimes Through Time", Telos Publishing Oct 2021
- The Dead Don't Die Twice, - Short Fiction Contribution "Straight Outta Dodge City", Baen Books Feb 2020

Sam Stone

- The Bastet Society, - Short Fiction Contribution "Tails of Terror", Golden Goblin Dec 2018
- Prologue, The Inheritance, Epilogue - Short Fiction Contributions "The Daemons of Devil's End", Telos Publishing Nov 2017
- Sacrifice - Short Fiction Contribution "Through a Mythos Darkly" - PS Publishing Jun 17
- The Curse of the Blue Diamond - Short Fiction Contribution - "The Further Associates of Sherlock Holmes" Titan Books Oct 2017
- Breaking Point - Short Fiction Contribution "Return of the Old Ones" - Dark Regions Press Mar 17
- The Gold of Roatan - Short Fiction Contribution "Dread Shadows in Paradise" - Golden Goblin 2016
- Tell Me No Lies - Short Story Contribution "Heroes of Red Hook" - Golden Goblin 2016
- The Puppet Master - Short Story Contribution "Edge of Sundown" - Chaosium Dec 2016
- Fallout - Short Story Contribution "Atomic Age Cthulhu" - Chaosium May 2015
- The Curse of Guangxu - Short Story Contribution "The Mammoth Book of Sherlock Holmes Abroad" - Constable and Robinson April 2015
- A Is for Acluaphobia: The Promise - Short Fiction Contribution "Phobophobias" Western Legends Dec 2014
- The Vessel – Short Story Contribution "The Dark Rites of Cthulhu" – April Moon Books March 2014
- Sonar City – Short Story Contribution "Eldritch Chrome" – Chaosium December 2013
- The Jealous Sea – Short Story Contribution "Terror Tales of the Seaside" Gray Friar Press – Oct 2013
- The Last Resort - Short Fiction Contribution "Fear the Reaper" Crystal Lake Publishing Oct 2013
- Imogen – Short Story Contribution "Best British Fantasy" – Salt Publishing April 2013
- Urban Wolf – Short Story Contribution "Demonologia Biblica" Western Legends – Feb 2013.
- Imogen – Short Story Contribution "Siblings" – Hersham Horror Sept 2012
- Hammer Out Books of Ghosts – Short Story Contributions "Immortal Monster" and "Chillers and Breathers" – ISBN 978-1-906263-58-4 Published by Fantom Films
- Full Fathom Forty – Short Story Contribution "The Toymaker's House" – ISBN 978-0-9538681-3-1 – published by The British Fantasy Society
- BFS Journal – Short Story Contribution "Walking the Dead" – published by The British Fantasy Society
- The Bitten Word – Short Story Contribution "Fool's Gold" – NewCon Press ISBN 978-1-907069-07-9

=== Editor ===
- Criminal Pursuits: Crimes Through Time - Telos Publishing Oct 2021 ISBN 978-1845831936
- The Daemons of Devil's End - Telos Publishing - ISBN 978-1-84583-970-3 Standard Edition ISBN 978-1-84583-969-7 Special Edition
- with David J. Howe – Hines Sight – Autobiography of Actor Frazer Hines – ISBN 978-1-84583-998-7
- Rules of Duel by Graham Masterton – Telos Publishing – ISBN 978-1-84583-054-0
- Dark Horizons, part of the BFS Journal, Winter 2010 – published by The British Fantasy Society
- Talespinning by David J. Howe Telos Publishing, Sep 2011 – ISBN 978-1-84583-058-8
