= Midnight Street =

Midnight Street was a British horror fiction magazine founded and published by Trevor Denyer. It was a resurrection of a previous publication titled Roadworks, published under the current title since 2004. It became defunct in 2024.

== See also ==
- Science fiction magazine
- Fantasy fiction magazine
- Horror fiction magazine
