= Black Static =

Speculative fiction magazine

- Cover of The Third Alternative
- Editor: Andy Cox
- Categories: Horror
- Frequency: Bimonthly
- Founded: 1994
- Company: TTA Press
- Country: United Kingdom
- Based in: Witcham, Cambridgeshire, England
- Language: English
- Website: ttapress.com/blackstatic/
- ISSN: 1753-0709

Black Static, formerly The 3rd Alternative, was a British horror magazine edited by Andy Cox. The magazine twice won the British Fantasy Award for "Best Magazine" while The 3rd Alternative twice won the same award for Best Small Press. In addition, individual stories published in the magazine won other awards and were reprinted in a number of collections of the year's best fiction.

Black Static was published by TTA Press alongside sister publications Crimewave, which takes a similarly idiosyncratic approach to crime fiction, and the long-running science fiction magazine Interzone. Together, The 3rd Alternative and Black Static were published for nearly 30 years.

== The 3rd Alternative ==
Founded in December 1993 as The 3rd Alternative, the magazine originally focused on a larger range of dark stories, often publishing science fiction, fantasy, and slipstream alongside horror. The 3rd Alternative ran for 42 issues before going on a short hiatus in 2005 after the acquisition of Interzone magazine by TTA Press.

== Black Static ==
In 2007 The 3rd Alternative was relaunched. Now focused exclusively on weird and horror fiction, the magazine was retitled Black Static. Authors published in Black Static include Nicholas Royle, Conrad Williams, Christopher Fowler, Aliette de Bodard, Steve Rasnic Tem, Nina Allan, Matthew Holness, Alexander Glass, Simon Avery, Gary McMahon, Gary Fry, Peter Tennant, Carole Johnston, Chris Kelso and Mike O'Driscoll. In addition, Black Static has also run opinion columns by Stephen Volk and Lynda E. Rucker as well book reviews by Peter Tennant and media reviews by Gary Couzens.

In February 2021, the format was changed to a double issue and the ability to purchase subscriptions was ended with the aim of winding the magazine down pending editor Andy Cox's retirement. The final edition of Black Static was the combined double issue 82/83 and was released in July 2023.

== Awards ==
During its 42 issue run, The 3rd Alternative won a number of awards including two British Fantasy Awards for "Best Small Press" and a BFA short story award for "Dancing About Architecture" by Martin Simpson. Since the magazine relaunched as Black Static, the story "My Stone Desire" by Joel Lane has won a British Fantasy Award, while other stories have been reprinted in collections such as Best Horror of the Year. In both 2011 and 2012, Black Static won the British Fantasy Award for Best Magazine/Periodical.
