= British Fantasy Award =

Annual fantasy fiction award

- Logo of the British Fantasy Society
- Awarded for: Best fantasy works of the previous year
- Country: United Kingdom
- Presented by: British Fantasy Society
- First award: 1972; 54 years ago
- Website: britishfantasysociety.org

The British Fantasy Awards (BFA) are awarded annually by the British Fantasy Society (BFS).

== History ==
In 1971, Ramsey Campbell suggested that the British Fantasy Society should present an award in honor of August Derleth, who died the same year. In 1972, Michael Moorcock received the inaugural August Derleth Fantasy Award for his novel The Knight of the Swords. In later years, the number of award categories increased. In 1976, the BFS renamed the awards from the August Derleth Fantasy Awards to the British Fantasy Awards, maintaining that the Best Novel category would retain the August Derleth award title.

In 2012, the awards were reorganized. From this point forward, the awards were chosen from the shortlist by juries, rather than popular vote amount BFS members and convention attendees. The best novel category, then known as the August Derleth Award, was divided. The new awards included the British Fantasy Award for Best Horror Novel, retaining the title of August Derleth Award, and the British Fantasy Award for Best Fantasy Novel, the Robert Holdstock Award.

== Categories ==
=== Current categories ===
BFA categories as of 2026
Category	Description and notes
Fantasy Novel; Robert Holdstock Award	Fiction over 40,000 words
Horror Novel; August Derleth Award	Fiction over 40,000 words
Novella	Fiction between 15,000 and 40,000 words
Short Fiction	Fiction under 15,000 words
Collection	Collection of works by a single author
Anthology	Collection of works by various authors
Magazine/Periodical	Non-fiction and fiction, print and online magazine or periodical
Audio (fiction)	Spoken word audio work (e.g. audiobook, radio drama, podcast) performed by one or more participants
Audio (non fiction)	Spoken word audio work(s) of non-fiction presented by one or more participants (e.g. podcasts, interviews, recorded discussion of writing techniques etc.)
Independent Press	An independent press active during the previous year
Artist	An artist working in any media format within the genre
Non-Fiction	Items eligible for this Award include non-fiction books, chapbooks, magazine or online columns or single magazine or online articles.
Special Award; Karl Edward Wagner Award	May be presented to individuals or organizations. May be presented for work completed in the previous year, or throughout their lifetime.
Newcomer; Sydney Bounds Award	New fiction writer

=== Previous categories ===
Category	Description and notes
Novel	Awarded 1972-2010. Beginning in 2012, this was split into Fantasy and Horror categories.
Comic/Graphic Novel	Awarded 1973–1980 as "Best Comic". Awarded 2009-2022 as "Best Comic / Graphic Novel".
Television/Film Production	Awarded intermittently from 1973-2022.

== Process ==
The membership of the BFS vote to determine the shortlists of the awards, the winners being decided by juries.

== Award controversy of 2011 ==
In 2011, British writer Sam Stone won the British Fantasy Award but returned it three days later after editor and anthologist Stephen Jones posted a blog entry pointing out that three of the winning entries (and many of the shortlisted works) were published by Telos Publishing, a company owned by David Howe. At the time, Howe was also chair of the British Fantasy Society, British Fantasy Award coordinator, and partner of Stone.
