= Exotic Gothic =

- Volume 1 first edition
- Editor: Danel Olson
- Language: English
- Subject: Anthology series
- Genre: Gothic fiction, Speculative fiction, Horror fiction, Supernatural fiction, Mystery fiction
- Publisher: Ash-Tree Press, PS Publishing
- Publication date: 2007-2013
- Publication place: Canada, United Kingdom
- Media type: Hardcover; Paperback; e-Book
- Awards: World Fantasy Award, Shirley Jackson Award

Exotic Gothic is an anthology series of original short fiction and novel excerpts in the gothic, horror and fantasy genres. A recipient of a World Fantasy Award and a Shirley Jackson Award, it is conceptualized and edited by Danel Olson, a professor of English at Lone Star College in Texas.

According to the Houston Chronicle newspaper, "The collection includes contemporary ghost, werewolf, vampire, and beastly creature stories; weird and paranormal tales; and neo-Gothic romances....[prompted from] a sabbatical last fall [2006], after his own Gothic research led him to a walking tour of Transylvania and facing a gypsy woman's curse..." The 2003 Bram Stoker Award-finalist webzine Horror World concludes that Exotic Gothic "raises the question as to 'How does the contemporary global Gothic enlarge, transcend, scramble, subvert, or mock the genre?' Olson subdivided the Anthology into Sections for Africa, Asia, Australia, Europe, Latin America, and North America. Each Section then has various stories that are set within or relate to the particular geographic area.." Inside the first volume, the editor "celebrates the loosening of geographic bonds, an emancipation of the genre."

== Volume 1 ==
Exotic Gothic: Forbidden Tales from Our Gothic World (published Oct. 2007 by Ash-Tree Press, hardcover and trade ppk., cover photography from Anne Brigman-courtesy Santa Barbara Museum of Art, 306pp.) "showcases twenty-three stories (eight original to the anthology) that take place around the world."

=== Africa ===
- "Mbo" by Nicholas Royle
- "In the Desert of Deserts" by Thomas Tessier

=== Oceania ===
- "Going Native" by John Bushore
- "The Butsudan" by Lucy Taylor

=== Asia ===
- "Twilight in the Green Zone" by David Wellington

=== Australia ===
- "Jarkman at the Othergates" by Terry Dowling

=== Europe ===
- "Rustle" by Peter Crowther
- "Forbidden Brides of the Faceless Slaves in the Nameless House of the Night of Dread Desire" by Neil Gaiman
- "Skin of My Soul" by Sean Meriwether
- "The Man Who Stalked Hyde" by William F. Nolan
- "The House by the Bulvarnoye Koltso" by Steve Rasnic Tem

=== Latin America ===
- "Bones" by Ilsa J. Bick
- "Extinctions in Paradise" by Brian Hodge
- Excerpt From Against Gravity by Farnoosh Moshiri
- "Tide Pool" by Douglas Unger

=== North America ===
- "The Black and White Sisters" by T. C. Boyle
- "The Pumpkin Child" by Nancy A. Collins
- "Ever After" by James Cortese
- "Lovecraft's Pillow" by Mark Steensland and Rick Hautala
- "Purity" by Thomas Ligotti
- "Waiting for the 400" by Kyle Marffin
- Excerpt From Beasts by Joyce Carol Oates
- "The Wide Wide Sea" by Barbara Roden

== Volume 2 ==
Exotic Gothic 2: New Tales of Taboo was published Sept. 2008 by Ash-Tree Press, hardcover and trade ppk., original cover photography by Nicholas Royle, 318pp.

Ellen Datlow described "Exotic Gothic 2 edited by Danel Olson (Ash-Tree Press) as a worthy follow-up to the editor's first, mixed reprint and original anthology. EG2 has all new stories taking place all over the world. The most notable were those by George Makana Clark, Barbara Roden, Nicholas Royle, Nancy A. Collins, Edward P. Crandall, Christopher Fowler, Reggie Oliver, Tia V. Travis, and Rob Hood."

The second volume was a finalist for the 2008 Shirley Jackson Award and had stories reprinted in the following year's round of "Best Of" collections.

=== Asia ===
- "Remembrance" by Dean Francis Alfar
- "The Arrangement" by Edward P. Crandall
- "Side-Effects May Include" by Steve Duffy
- "Stones" by Genni Gunn
- "The Most Precious Thing in Antalya" by Milorad Pavić (writer)
- "Enlightenment" by John Whitbourn

=== Africa ===
- "Blood Reader" by George Makana Clark
- "Very Low-Flying Aircraft" by Nicholas Royle

=== Europe ===
- "The Barony at Rodal" by Peter Bell
- "The Ice Wedding"" by Nancy A. Collins
- "Arkangel"" by Christopher Fowler
- "Tivar" by Taylor Kincaid aka Lucy Taylor
- "Black Death" by Kenneth McKenney
- "A Donkey at the Mysteries" by Reggie Oliver
- "Burning Snow" by Steve Rasnic Tem
- "Grvniče" by David Wellington (author)

=== North America ===
- "Monkey Bottom" by John Bushore
- "Los Penitentes" by Elizabeth Massie
- "One Thousand Dragon Sheets" by Tia V. Travis

=== South America ===
- "A Line Through el Salar d'Uyuni" by Adam Golaski

=== Australia ===
- "Empathy" by Stephen Dedman
- Excerpt From Clowns at Midnight by Terry Dowling
- "Kulpunya" by Rob Hood

=== Antarctica ===
- "Endless Night" by Barbara Roden

== Volume 3 ==
Exotic Gothic 3: Strange Visitations was published in Dec. 2009 by Ash-Tree Press, hardcover, original art by Jason Zerillo, 277pp.

In each successive volume of the Exotic Gothic series so far, women have assumed more presence on the table of contents, but it is a presence still shy of what one sampling of contemporary American-edited horror anthologies found: Black Static staff reviewer Peter Tennant discusses the disparity of women in US and British horror anthologies (not mentioning Exotic Gothic 3, but writing within ten months of Exotic Gothic 3's release), pointing out that women make up around 32% of the contributors for American-edited horror anthologies he examined, and merely 21% of the contributors for contemporary UK-edited horror anthologies he examined. Reviewer Rich Horton in the March 2010 issue of Locus (magazine), praised Exotic Gothic 3 for its "evocations of ghost traditions unfamiliar to most Westerners." Horton wrote that "I found my favorite story to be the most traditional, Barbara Roden's "The Haunted House of Etobicoke," and it is so beautifully executed that we are moved again."

Peter Tennant, writing in Black Static, noted that "Of the other overlapping anthologies, Exotic Gothic 3 scored with both [anthologists] Jones and Datlow" in 2010. Author Stephen Jones found "The third volume in the series edited and introduced by Danel Olson, Exotic Gothic 3, was one of the more satisfying anthologies of the year." Humanities Librarian Richard Bleiler describes it as a "strong and often satisfying collection of stories." Bleiler argues that some of the books best tales come out of Africa and Europe: Zimbabwe born contributor "George Makana Clarke's tale is gripping and nightmarish and carries an internal conviction," while "disastrous relationships ... figure prominently in the European section, and the horrors of the Third Reich and the Balkan Wars echo ... particularly [in] Peter Bell's 'The Barony at Rodal,' Christopher Fowler's 'Arkangel,' and David Wellington (author)'s 'Grvnice'." In a summary of international horror fiction from 2009, anthologist Ellen Datlow argues that Exotic Gothic 3 "is an all original collection ... with terrific ones from Simon Clark, Terry Dowling, Simon Kurt Unsworth, and Kaaron Warren, and good ones from the other contributors."

The third volume was a finalist for the 2009 Shirley Jackson Award and 2010 World Fantasy Award, and had stories reprinted in the following year's round of "Best Of" collections.

=== Oceania and Australasia ===
- "Behind Dark Blue Eyes" by Rob Hood
- "Sanguma" by Lucy Taylor
- "The Gaze Dogs of Nine Waterfall" by Kaaron Warren

=== Asia ===
- "Bruhita" by Dean Francis Alfar
- "Two Steps Along the Road" by Terry Dowling
- "The Suicide Wood" by Steve Duffy
- "Keramat" by Tunku Halim
- "Extended Family" by Tina Rath
- "From the Lips of Lazarus" by Stephen Volk

=== Africa ===
- "Mine" by Simon Clark
- "Mami Wata" by Simon Kurt Unsworth

=== Europe ===
- "The Stranger" by Isobelle Carmody
- "The Orange and Lemon Cafe" by Dejana Dimitrijevic
- "Profanities" by Paul Finch
- "To Forget and Be Forgotten" by Adam L. G. Nevill
- "Meeting with Mike" by Reggie Oliver
- From Paper Theater by Milorad Pavić (writer)
- "Citizen Komarova Finds Love" by Ekaterina Sedia
- From Amarcord by Zoran Živković (writer)

=== North America ===
- From Freak House by James Cortese
- "The Dismal Mirror" by Brian Evenson
- "The Haunted House in Etobicoke" by Barbara Roden
- From Deadfall Hotel by Steve Rasnic Tem

== Volume 4 ==
Exotic Gothic 4: A Postscripts Anthology was released as hardcover July 2012 and paperback January 2014 by PS Publishing, original cover photography by Apolinar L. Chuca, 301pp.

Writing for LOCUS magazine Lois Tilton described the fourth incarnation as "Neo-Gothic stories, which the editor aptly characterizes as 'that genre of things wrongly hungered for and things wrongly alive." Mario Guslandi, writing for Thirteen O'Clock, echoes Tilton's fondness for the book's non-Western settings: "[The] stories by a distinguished group of genre experts, set in different locations, addressing a diversity of themes [still share] the character of modern gothic fiction [but] set in places of the world we either least associate with 'gothic' or fail to even consider in the genre."

Making a case that the anthology represents social criticism, Morgan interprets Margo Lanagan's lead-story in the collection, "Blooding the Bride", as "a strong feminist subtext on the nature of the marriage rite as an oppressive trap for women, even in our modern, post-feminist movement time." According to Morgan the book is dominated by "themes of cultural oppression, the evil claws of colonialism still deeply embedded in the back of certain nations, feminine sacrifice to ancient traditions with hidden shackles, ... elavat[ing] them beyond mere horror stories."

A review in Dead Reckoning described the novel as "a sumptuous package," with stories "sensuous," "skewed and grotesque," "passionate," and "ambiguously ghostly."

Eotic Gothic 4 won the World Fantasy Award for Best Edited Anthology on 3 November 2013, as well as the Shirley Jackson Award for Superior Anthology on 14 July 2013. In an interview after the awards in The Gothic Imagination, Olson described his approach to selecting the stories: "My hope is to choose stories that, like dreams, resurface long after our first experience with them, and often an indication of that power manifests in the images, rhythms, struggles, and secret identifications within [their] opening paragraph."

=== Asia ===
- "Carving" by David Punter
- "Fall" by Stephen Dedman
- "In the Village of Setang" by Tunku Halim

=== Australasia ===
- "Blooding the Bride" by Margo Lanagan
- "Pig Thing" by Adam L.G. Nevill
- "The Lighthouse Keepers' Club" by Kaaron Warren

=== Latin America & Caribbean ===
- "Atacama" by David Wellington (author)
- "Escena de un Asesinato" by Rob Hood
- "Water Lover" by Genni Gunn
- "The Old Man Beset by Demons" by Steve Rasnic Tem

=== Europe ===
- "Helena" by Ekaterina Sedia
- "Mariners' Round" by Terry Dowling
- "Metro Winds" by Isobelle Carmody
- "Oschaert" by Paul Finch
- "Rusalka" by Anna Taborska

=== Africa ===
- "The Fourth Horse" by Simon Kurt Unsworth
- "The Look" by Reggie Oliver
- "Nikishi" by Lucy Taylor

=== North America ===
- "Candy" by Nick Antosca
- "Celebrity Frankenstein" by Stephen Volk
- "Down in the Valley" by Joseph Bruchac
- "Grottor" by Brian Evenson
- "Such a Man I Would Have Become" by E. Michael Lewis
- "The Unfinished Book" by Scott Thomas
- "Wanishin" by Cherie Dimaline

== Volume 5 ==
Exotic Gothic 5 was released 2013 by PS Publishing, hardcover, Vol. I original front and back cover photography by Marcela Bolívar, design by Michael Smith, 244 pages;

One of the short stories, "The Open Mirror" from Georges-Olivier Châteaureynaud, first appeared in its original French in the Catholic daily, La Croix in 2008. "A Game of Draughts" from Joyce Carol Oates was published in similar form in her 2013 novel, The Accursed.

Italian reviewer Mario Guslandi described the volume as "dark stories of modern gothic from every corner of the world ... apt to elicit pleasurable shivers without resorting to gore and violence." Horror Novel Reviews agreed with Guslandi regarding the volumes' disinclination towards blood and grue: "Like the prior anthologies, [Olsen] focuses on the Gothic literary tradition of suspense, fear, and atmosphere rather than gore and violence." Comparing the two volumes, Horror Novel Reviews concludes that though it "reaches into the colonial fear of native sexuality" A consensus by Locus editors and reviewers placed Exotic Gothic 5 on the 2013 Locus Recommended Reading List along with one dozen other original anthologies.

A review in the print quarterly Gothic Beauty by Gail Brasie conclude that "the series [stops] the assumption that the only people reading neo-Gothic stories are white kids" and does so successful: "The storytelling is brilliant and as varied as the settings."

=== Europe ===
- "All the Lost Ones" by Deborah Biancotti (begins Volume I)
- "The Open Mirror" by Georges-Olivier Châteaureynaud (trans. Edward Gauvin)
- "L'Amour est Mort" by Simon Clark (novelist)
- "Elena's Egg" by Theodora Goss
- "The Girl in the Blue Coat" by Anna Taborska

=== North America ===
- "Burial Grounds" by Nick Antosca
- "Moonrise on Hermit Beach" by Nancy A. Collins
- "Goth Thing" by D. E. Cowen & Danel Olson
- "The Coroner's Bride" by Camille DeAngelis
- "The Starvation Experiment" by Sheri Holman
- "A Game of Draughts" by Joyce Carol Oates
- "Foodface" by Stephen Susco
- "The Girl Next Door" by Gemini Wahhaj

=== Australia ===
- "The Sleepover" by Terry Dowling (begins Volume II)

=== Africa ===
- "The Sweet Virgin Meat" by Kola Boof
- "XYZ" by Lily Herne
- "The Secondary Host" by John Llewellyn Probert

=== Latin America ===
- "El Nahual" by Berumen & Coyote
- "More Than Pigs and Rosaries Can Give" by Carlos Hernandez
- "Xibalba" by Thana Niveau

=== Asia ===
- "Haveli" by Anil Menon
- "Diabolically Yours" by Charu Nivedita
- "Juicing the Knife" by Deborah Noyes
- "He Who Beheld the Darkness" by Reggie Oliver
- "The Statue in the Garden" by Paul Park
- "Djinn's Blood" by Lucy Taylor
