= Sentinel: Descendants in Time =

2004 video game

- Developer: Detalion
- Publisher: The Adventure Company
- Platform: Microsoft Windows
- Release: NA: December 14, 2004; EU: March 18, 2005
- Genre: Adventure

Sentinel: Descendants in Time (Polish: Sentinel: Strażnik Grobowca, also known as Realms of Illusion) is a "puzzle-adventure, Myst-clone" video game released in 2004.

== Gameplay ==
The game contains logic puzzles that are reminiscent of the game Myst and Mysterious Journey II, whereby the player has to work out how the mysterious machinery function through observation and experimentation. The game has a hint system similar to that used in Myst IV, which when turned on informs the player of their aim when they approach a puzzle.

== Plot ==
Set in an unspecified future, the narrative focuses on a young man named Beni, whose sister is kidnapped, causing him to embark on a quest to loot the tomb of a technologically advanced race that has since vanished.

== Development ==
The game was based on a "previously published story – The Ichneumon and the Dormeuse – which first appeared in Interzone magazine in the UK back in April 1996". When describing the influence of art history in the "phantasmagorical, fantastic worlds" seen in games such as Sentinel, Detalion co-founder Lukasz Pisarek explained "I remember that while developing a concept, when we tried to explain to one another what we had in mind, we communicated using not only our own drawings, but we also resorted to Gaudi and Art Nouveau, among others, and to Simmons' Hyperion.

The game, along with Mysterious Journey II, was "developed in Poland, written in Australia (what we’ve been calling Detalion Down Under), voice recorded and published in Canada", then made available in various languages. The development decided not to include timed sequences in the game after the negative reception this had in the company's previous game Reah. They were unable to release the music on a soundtrack CD because of their restrictive licensing contract. The game was designed with no death-states; project leader Maciej Miasik explained "we've been developing non-violent, never-die adventures since we started working on PC adventures and this isn't likely to change soon".

== Critical reception ==
Reception

Aggregate score
Aggregator	Score
Metacritic	71/100

Review scores
Publication	Score
Adventure Gamers	3.5/5
Computer Gaming World	3/5
GameSpot	6.7/10
GameSpy	2/5
GameZone	8/10
Jeuxvideo.com	13/20
PC Gamer (UK)	31%
PC Zone	47%
The New York Times	(positive)

The game received "average" reviews according to the review aggregation website Metacritic.

Charles Herold of The New York Times explained, "Toward the end, the game fills with busywork, too often forcing the player to wander back and forth in increasing frustration, but at its best Sentinel is a cerebral blast." GameSpot concluded, "Sentinel boasts attractive graphics and high-quality puzzles. Unfortunately, the game often undermines its biggest strengths by taking those captivating puzzles and turning them into extremely repetitive busywork." GameSpy wrote that the "puzzles have nothing to do with the story, but the story doesn't make sense anyway." Adventure Gamers said, "Sentinel is a beautiful game [but] this rich exterior masks a rather hollow gameplay with low levels of interactivity."
