= Reggie Oliver (writer) =

English playwright, biographer and writer

- Born: 1952 (age 73–74); London, England
- Education: Eton College
- Alma mater: University College, Oxford
- Occupations: Playwright; biographer; author
- Spouse: Joanna Dunham (m. 1992; died 2014)
- Relatives: Stella Gibbons (aunt)

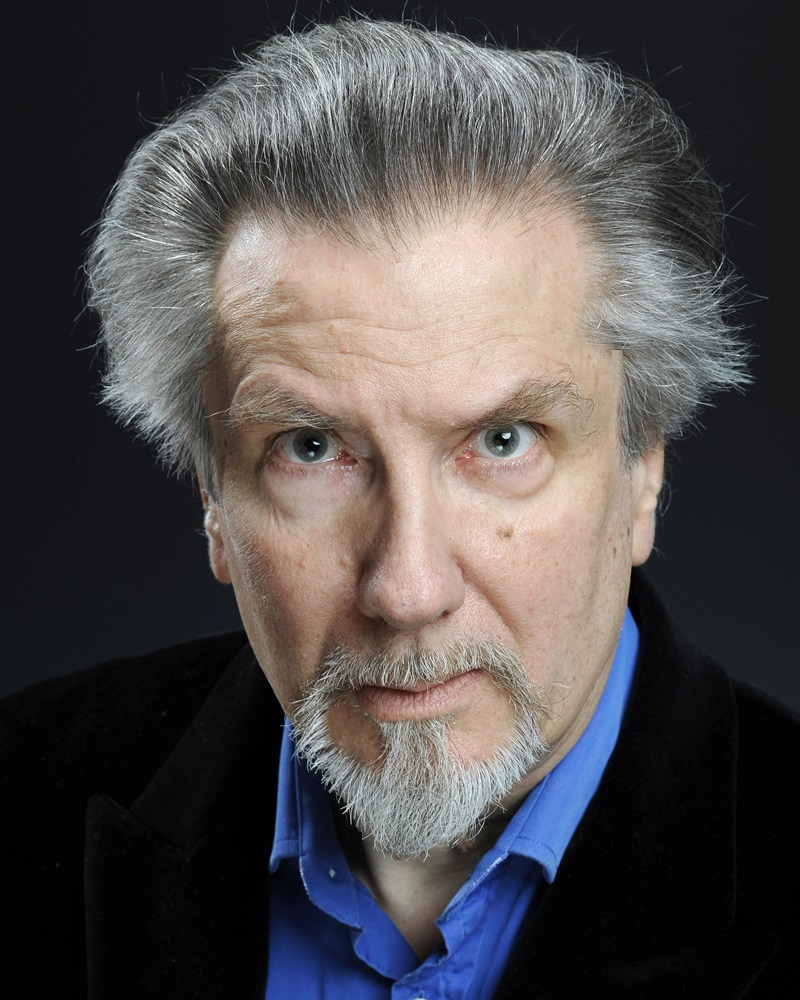
Reggie Oliver

Reggie Oliver (born 1952 in London) is an English playwright, biographer and writer of ghost stories.

== Life and career ==
Reggie Oliver was educated at Eton (Newcastle Scholar, 1970, Oppidan Scholar) and University College, Oxford (BA Hons 1975), and has been a professional playwright, actor, and theatre director since 1975.

He has worked in radio, television, films, and theatre, both in the West End and outside London. He was a founding member of the late Sir Anthony Quayle's Compass Theatre, and both played the part of Traverse and understudied Sir Anthony in the tour and West End run of The Clandestine Marriage in 1984.

His plays include Imaginary Lines (which was first produced and directed by Alan Ayckbourn at Scarborough in 1985 and has since been translated into several languages), Absolution (King's Head, 1983), Back Payments (King's Head, 1985), Taking Liberties (Wolsey, Ipswich, 1996), Put Some Clothes On, Clarisse! (Duchess Theatre, London, 1989), and Winner Takes All—the last described by Michael Billington as "the funniest evening in London" when it was revived at the Orange Tree Theatre in 2000. His play A Portrait of Two Artists was performed on Radio 3 in 1989.

Oliver's biography of his aunt Stella Gibbons, Out of the Woodshed, was published by Bloomsbury in 1998; and he is a contributor to the historical magazine History Today. He has written about ghost stories for such journals as Supernatural Tales, All Hallows, Wormwood for which he wrote the regular Under Review column from 2010 to 2022, and Weirdly Supernatural.

He lives in Suffolk and was married to the artist and actress Joanna Dunham until her death in 2014.

== Horror fiction ==
Oliver's first horror story appeared in the journal Weirdly Supernatural under the Haunted River imprint. This was followed by Oliver's first two collections, The Dreams of Cardinal Vittorini and The Complete Symphonies of Adolf Hitler, again under the Haunted River imprint. The former was nominated for an International Horror Guild Award and the latter short-listed by the Dracula Society for a Children of the Night award. Both books received favourable notices from reviewers in such small press magazines as Weird Tales and All Hallows.

In All Hallows 34, Jim Rockhill praised Oliver's The Dreams of Cardinal Vittorini, noting:

Oliver’s ability to create a sense of time and place in every one of these stories is exemplary.... As a work of spiritual terror it has few peers.... Thomas Ligotti and Matt Cardin are the only authors writing today who equal the assurance demonstrated by the author of this tale in ripping away the veil separating mundane reality from the shrieking abyss it conceals.

Ramsey Campbell has also written positively about the same work: "Oliver’s sharp eye for character and ear for dialogue never desert him.". In his introduction to The Folio Book of Horror Stories he wrote "I believe Reggie Oliver to be the greatest living British classicist in our field who upholds its highest literary qualities."

His experiences in the worlds of academe, the Church of England, and the arts have all provided inspiration for his work. A number of his stories are set within the rather seedy end of show business, drawing on his background as a playwright, director and actor. Douglas Campbell wrote of one such story, "The Skins", "I find it hard to believe that there wasn't some kind of a dare involved when Oliver set out to write a tale about a haunted pantomime horse, but the story itself is an unforgettable piece, drawing to a grotesque and pathetic climax in a horribly plausible world of down-at-heel theatre folk."

He has pastiched a number of styles and authors, from Restoration comedy and 16th-century mystical texts to Oscar Wilde and M. R. James. A story in Arthur Machen's style resulted in his winning the Friends of Arthur Machen short story competition in 2005.

Oliver's work has appeared in over seventy anthologies, including Acquainted with the Night,Year's Best Fantasy and Horror, Best New Horror etc. He has acted as consultant on a project which has seen all of M. R. James's ghost stories released on CD.

In April 2010, Centipede Press published Oliver's collected short stories in a volume which features many new illustrations. He frequently illustrates his own work, and very occasionally that of others such as Anna Taborska, Robert Shearman and Susan Hill.

== Publications ==
=== Plays ===
- Imaginary Lines (Samuel French, 1987)
- Put Some Clothes On, Clarisse! (Samuel French, 1990)
- The Music Lovers (Samuel French, 1992)
- Winner Takes All (Samuel French, 2001)
- Love Unknown (in Shadow Plays Egaeus Press 2012)
- Once Bitten (Samuel French, 2012)

=== Biography ===
- Out of the Woodshed: The Life of Stella Gibbons (Bloomsbury, 1998)

=== Fiction ===
- The Dreams of Cardinal Vittorini and Other Strange Stories (Haunted River, 2003, reprinted by Tartarus Press, 2012)
- The Complete Symphonies of Adolf Hitler (Haunted River, 2005, reprinted by Tartarus Press 2013)
- Masques of Satan: Twelve Tales and a Novella (Ash-Tree Press, 2007, reprinted by Tartarus Press 2016)
- Madder Mysteries (Ex Occidente Press, 2009)
- The Wounds of Exile, novella (Passport Levant 2010)
- The Dracula Papers, novel (Chomu Press 2011)
- Mrs Midnight and Other Stories (Tartarus Press, 2011)
- Virtue in Danger, novel (Zagava Press/Ex Occidente Press, 2013)
- Flowers of the Sea, Thirteen Stories and Two Novellas (Tartarus Press, 2013)
- Holidays from Hell, Fourteen Stories (Tartarus Press, 2017)
- The Boke of the Divill (Dark Regions Press, 2017)
- The Ballet of Dr Caligari, and Madder Mysteries (Tartarus Press, 2018)
- A Maze for the Minotaur, and other strange stories (Tartarus Press, 2021)
- This Haunted Heaven, ten strange stories (Tartarus Press, 2024)
- Wings of Night, novel (PS Publishing, October 2025)

=== For Children ===
- The Hauntings at Tankerton Park (Zagava Press 2016)

=== Collected and Selected editions ===
- Dramas from the Depths (Centipede Press, 2010) (omnibus volume containing all stories from The Dreams of Cardinal Vittorini, The Complete Symphonies of Adolf Hitler, and Masques of Satan, and several stories from Madder Mysteries)
- Shadow Plays (Egaeus Press 2012)
- The Sea of Blood (Dark Renaissance 2015)
- Stages of Fear (Black Shuck Books 2020)

=== Plays Performed ===
- 1974 ZULEIKA(musical adaptation of Zuleika Dobson, music by Michael Brand) Oxford Playhouse
- 1975 NEW YEAR REVOLUTIONS (Revue) Overground Theatre, Kingston
- 1976 BRITISH BULL (Revue with Jeremy Browne) Overground Theatre, Kingston
- 1978 YOU MIGHT AS WELL LIVE (Half Moon Theatre, Tramshed etc.)RUDE HEALTH (Revue with Jeremy Browne) Overground Theatre, Kingston
- 1984 ABSOLUTION, King's Head Theatre, Islington
- 1985 IMAGINARY LINES, Stephen Joseph, Scarborough BACK PAYMENTS, King's Head Theatre, Islington
- 1986 A PORTRAIT OF TWO ARTISTS, Royal Academy etc. Subsequently, performed Radio 3 1989
- 1989 PUT SOME CLOTHES ON, CLARISSE!, (Feydeau adaptation) Duchess Theatre, London
- 1991 SUGAR PLUM (Feydeau adaptation) Theatre West Tour
- 1992 SCOOPING THE POT (Feydeau adaptation) Theatre West Tour, subsequently renamed WINNER TAKES ALL and performed Wolsey Ipswich, 1996 Orange Tree Richmond, 2000 etc.
- 1993 THE MUSIC LOVERS (Feydeau adaptation) Numerous amateur & student productions
- 1995 TAKING LIBERTIES (Maupassant adaptation) Wolsey Studio, Ipswich
- 2010 STAGE FRIGHTS, one man show based on his stories (The Cut, Halesworth, Brighton World Horror Conference etc.)
- 2010 ONCE BITTEN (Adapted from Hennequin and Delacour's Le Procés Veauradieux) Orange Tree Theatre, Richmond. December 2010– February 2011

=== Stories in anthologies ===
- "The Devil's Number" in Acquainted with the Night (Ash-Tree Press, 2004)
- "The Silver Cord" in Faunus 12 (FOAM 2005)
- "Among the Tombs" in Year's Best Fantasy & Horror 2006 (St Martin's Press)
- "Mr Poo-Poo" in At Ease with the Dead (Ash-Tree Press, 2007) and Year's Best Fantasy & Horror 2008 (St Martin's Press)
- "Mmm Delicious" in Zencore (Megazanthus Press 2007)
- "The Devil's Funeral" in Shades of Darkness (Ash-Tree Press, 2008)
- "A Donkey at the Mysteries" in Exotic Gothic 2 (Ash-Tree Press, 2008) and The Mammoth Book of Best New Horror 20 (Robinson 2009)
- "The Children of Monte Rosa" in Dark Horizons (2007) The Mammoth Book of Best New Horror 19 (Robinson 2008) The Onyx Book of Occult Fiction (Snuggly Books, 2024)
- "Meeting with Mike"in Exotic Gothic 3 (Ash-Tree Press, 2009)
- "Countess Otho" in Strange Tales 3 (Tartarus Press 2009)
- "The Head" in The Fourth Black Book of Horror (Mortbury Press 2009)
- "Mrs Midnight" in The Fifth Black Book of Horror (Mortbury Press 2009) The Best Horror of the Year Vol. 2 (Night Shade Books 2010) and Ghosts, recent hauntings (Prime Books 2012)
- "Mr Pigsny"in The Sixth Black Book of Horror (Mortbury Press 2010) The Best Horror of the Year Vol. 3 (Night Shade Books 2011)and Nightmares, a new decade of modern horror (Tachyon 2016)
- "Puss-Cat" in Tails of Wonder and Imagination (Nightshade Books 2010)
- "The Black Metaphysical" in Cinnabar's Gnosis (Ex Occidente 2010)
- "Beside the Shrill Sea" in Brighton Shock (PS Publishing 2010)
- "You Have Nothing To Fear" in Null Immortalis (Nemonymous 10, Megazanthus Press 2010)
- "The Game of Bear" (completion of an unfinished M.R.James story) The Mammoth Book of Best New Horror 21 (Robinson 2010)
- "Minos or Rhadamanthus" in The Seventh Black Book of Horror (Mortbury Press 2010)
- "Singing Blood" in Delicate Toxins (Side Real Press 2011)
- "Flowers of the Sea" in The Horror Anthology of Horror Anthologies (Megazanthus Press 2011) and The Folio Book of Horror Stories (The Folio Society 2018)
- "The Philosophy of the Damned" in The Master in Café Morphine (Ex Occidente 2011)
- "Quieta Non Movere" in The Eighth Black Book of Horror (Mortbury Press 2011) and The Mammoth Book of Best New Horror 23 (Robinson 2012)
- "Baskerville's Midgets" in Blood and Other Cravings (TOR 2011)
- "A Child's Problem" in A Book of Horror (Jo Fletcher Books 2011)
- "Striding Edge" in Terror Tales of the Lake District (Gray Friar Press 2011) and Folklore Horror Short Stories (Flame Tree Publishing 2026)
- "Hand to Mouth" in Haunts (Ulysses Press 2011) and Bruin's Midnight Reader (Bruin Books 2022)
- "The Look" in Exotic Gothic 4 (PS Publishing, May 2012)
- "Charm" in Terror Tales of the Cotswolds (Gray Friar Press 2012)
- "Portrait of a Chair" in Dadaoism (Chomu Press 2012)
- "A Posthumous Messiah" in This Hermetic Legislature(Ex Occidente 2012)
- "The Dancer in the Dark" in Visions Fading Fast (Pendragon Press 2012)
- "The Spooks of Shellborough" in Terror Tales of East Anglia (Gray Friar Press 2012)
- "Lord of the Fleas" in Zombie Apocalypse Fightback (Robinson 2012)
- "What Shall We Do About Barker?" in The Screaming Book of Horror (Screaming Dreams 2012)
- "Between Four Yews" in The Ghosts and Scholars Book of Shadows (Sarob Press 2012) and The Mammoth Book of Best New Horror 24 (Robinson 2013)
- "Didman's Corner" in Shadows and Tall Trees 4. Autumn 2012 (Undertow Publications 2012)
- "Come into My Parlour in Dark World (Tartarus Press 2013) and Best British Horror 2014 (Salt Publishing 2014) and The Mammoth Book of Best New Horror 25 (Robinson 2014)
- "He Who Beheld the Darkness" in Exotic Gothic 5, Vol. II (PS Publishing 2013)
- "The Day of the Delusionists" in Oxford's Loudest Laughter (Orient International Book House 2013) slightly rewritten as " A Day with the Delusionists" in Best British Horror 2018 (Newcon Press 2018)
- "The Silken Drum" in Faerie Tales, Stories of the Grimm and Gruesome (Jo Fletcher Books 2013)
- "The Green Hour" in Psycho-Mania! (Robinson 2013)
- "Holiday from Hell" in Terror Tales of the Seaside (Gray Friar Press 2013)
- "The Archbishop's Well" in Weirder Shadows over Innsmouth (PS Publishing 2013)
- "The Perfect Author" in Flotsam Fantastique (World Fantasy Convention Souvenir Book 2013)
- "The Druid's Rest" in Terror Tales of Wales (Gray Friar Press 2014)
- "The Book and the Ring" in The Spectral Book of Horror (Spectral Press 2014)
- "Absalom" in The Ghosts and Scholars Book of Shadows 2 (Sarob Press 2014)
- "The Maze at Huntsmere" in Soliloquy for Pan (Egaeus Press 2015) and The Ghosts and Scholars Book of Mazes(Sarob Press 2020)
- "Possessions" in Horrorology (Jo Fletcher Books 2015)
- "The Rooms Are High" in The Best Horror of the Year Vol. 8 (Night Shade Books 2016) and Year's Best Weird Fiction Vol.3 (Undertow Publications 2016)
- "Rapture" in Marked to Die (Snuggly Books 2016)
- "Love at Second Sight" in Uncertainties Volume II (Swan River Press 2016)
- "The Ballet of Dr. Caligari" in The Madness of Dr. Caligari (Fedogan & Bremer 2016) and Best New Horror #28 (PS Publishing 2018)
- "The Vampyre Trap" in Murder Ballads (Egaeus Press 2017)
- "An Actor's Nightmare" in Nightmare's Realm (Dark Regions Press 2017)
- "Trouble at Botathan" in Terror Tales of Cornwall (Telos Publishing 2017)
- "The Endless Corridor" in Dark Discoveries #37 (JournalStone 2017) and Best New Horror #29 (PS Publishing 2019)
- "Ech-Pi-El" and "The Armies of the Night" in The Lovecraft Squad - Waiting (Pegasus Books 2017)
- "Love and Death" in The Scarlet Soul, Stories for Dorian Gray (Swan River Press 2017) and Best British Horror 2018 (Newcon Press 2018)
- "Coruvorn" in The Silent Garden (The Silent Garden Collective 2018) and Best of British Fantasy 2018 (NewCon Press 2019)
- "The Black Ship" in The Lovecraft Squad - Dreaming (Pegasus Books 2018) and Weird Horror Short Stories (Flame Tree Publishing 2022)
- "Lady with a Rose" in The Book of Flowering (Egaeus Press 2019)
- "The Final Stage" in I am the Abyss (Dark Regions Press 2019)
- "A Fragment of Thucydides" in George Cawkwell of Univ (S. Godage & Bros 2019)
- "A Maze for the Minotaur" in Soot and Steel: Dark Tales of London (NewCon Press 2019)
- "The Old Man of the Woods" in The Pale Illuminations (Sarob Press 2019), Best New Horror #31 (PS Publishing 2021), and, revised and retitled as "Le Vieux des Bois" in Revenants, the Ghost Issue edited by Joyce Carol Oates and Bradford Morrow (Conjunctions No 83 Bard College)
- "Shadowy Waters" in The Far Tower (Swan River Press 2019)
- "The Devils in the White City" in The Lovecraft Squad: Rising (Pegasus Books 2020)
- "Porson's Piece" in Apostles of the Weird (PS Publishing 2020) and Best New Horror #30 (PS Publishing 2020)
- "The Crumblies" in Crooked Houses (Egaeus Press 2020)
- "Collectable" in Strange Tales, Tartarus Press at 30 (Tartarus Press 2020)
- "Monkey's" in Terror Tales of the Home Counties (Telos Publishing 2020)
- "The Wet Woman" in Infra Noir 2020 (Zagava 2021)
- "Grey Glass" in December Tales (Curious Blue Press 2021)
- "Drumglass Chapel" in Terror Tales of the Scottish Lowlands (Telos Publishing 2021)
- "The Ninth Curtain" in Grotesqueries (Zagava 2022)
- "From the man-seat" in 'Darkness Beckons' (Flame Tree Press 2023)
- "Fell Creatures" in 'Something Peculiar' (Black Shuck Books 2023)
- "This Haunted Heaven" in Terror Tales of the Mediterranean (Telos Publishing 2023)
- "The Cardinal's Ring" in Infernal Mysteries (Egaeus Press 2024)
- "South Riding" in Shadowplays (PS Publishing 2024)
- "Crocodile Jam" in New Writings in Horror & the Supernatural, Volume Three (PS Publishing 2025)
- "Nephilim" in Terror Tales of Chaos (Telos Publishing 2025)
- "Funeral at St Botolph's" in Tales of Occult Britain (Hellebore Books 2025)
- "In Arcadia" in The Astral Pages (billectric 2026)
- "Sad Gardens" in Nightmare Abbey#10 (Dead Letter Press 2026)
- "Rhubarb! Rhubarb!" in Nightmare Abbey#11 (Dead Letter Press 2026)
- "The Silver Key" in Terror Tales of Christmas (Telos Publishing 2026)

=== Criticism ===
- "Are they all Horrid? Diane Setterfield's The Thirteenth Tale and the validity of Gothic Fiction" in 21st Century Gothic – Great Gothic Novels since 2000 (The Scarecrow Press 2011)
- Introduction to Intrusions by Robert Aickman (Tartarus Press 2012)
- Epithalamion in Booklore, a passion for books. (Zagava 2016)
- Introduction to Victorian Ghost Stories (Flame Tree Press 2022)

=== Awards ===
- Children of the Night Award 2011 (best work of supernatural fiction 2011) for Mrs Midnight (Tartarus Press)
- Arthur Machen Short Story Prize 2005 for "The Silver Cord" in Faunus 12 (FOAM 2005)

Numerous nominations for World Fantasy, British Fantasy, Stoker, International Horror Guild and Shirley Jackson awards
