= Genni Gunn =

Canadian novelist, poet, and translator

Genni Gunn is a Canadian novelist, poet, and translator.

Born in Trieste, Italy, she currently resides in Vancouver, British Columbia. Gunn has a B.F.A. and an M.F.A. from the University of British Columbia. She is chair of Public Lending Rights, a member of The Writers' Union of Canada and the Literary Translators' Association of Canada and PEN International.

Her 2020 short story collection Permanent Tourist was shortlisted for the 2021 ReLit Award for short fiction.

== Bibliography ==
=== Novels ===
- Thrice Upon a Time (1990), ISBN 0-919627-81-1
- Tracing Iris (2001), ISBN 1-55192-486-2
- Solitaria (2010), ISBN 1-897109-43-1

=== Short stories ===
- On the Road (1991), ISBN 0-88750-840-5
- Hungers (2002), ISBN 1-55192-566-4
- Permanent Tourists (2020)

=== Short stories in multiple-author anthologies ===
- "Stones" (2008), Exotic Gothic 2 (ed. Danel Olson), ISBN 978-1-55310-109-3 hardbound, ISBN 978-1-55310-110-9 paperback
- "Water Lover" (May 2012), Exotic Gothic 4 (ed. Danel Olson), ISBN 978-1-84863-300-1 hardbound, ISBN 978-1-84863-301-8 slipcased & signed edition
- "Beached" (2012), Room Magazine

=== Poetry ===
- Mating in Captivity (1993), ISBN 1-55082-067-2
- Faceless (2007), ISBN 1-897109-16-4
- Accidents (2022) ISBN 978-1-773240-98-5

=== Translations ===
- Devour Me Too, by Dacia Maraini (1987)
- Traveling in the Gait of a Fox, by Dacia Maraini (1992)
- Text Me, by Corrado Calabrò, 2014

=== Opera libretto ===
- Alternate Visions (2007) (music by John Oliver) Produced by Chants Libres, Montreal.

=== Travel memoir ===
- Tracks: Journeys in Time and Place (2013), ISBN 978-1-927426-32-6
