= Lucy Taylor =

American horror novel writer (born 1950)

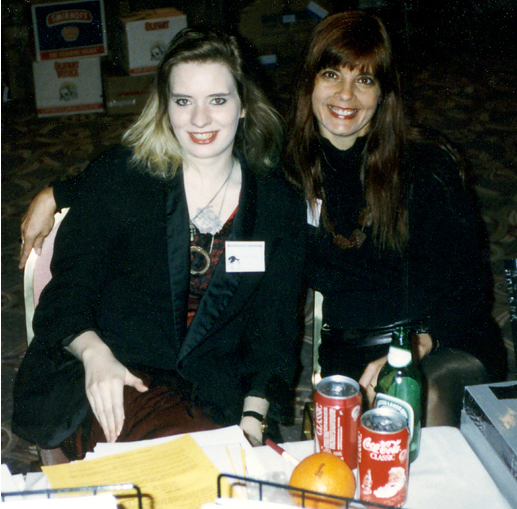
- Jasmine Sailing and Lucy Taylor at World Horror Convention III (1993)
- Born: November 30, 1951 (age 74)
- Occupation: Novelist
- Writing career
- Period: Contemporary
- Genre: horror

Lucy Taylor (born November 30, 1951) is an American horror novel writer. Her novel, The Safety of Unknown Cities was awarded the Bram Stoker Award for Best First Novel and the International Horror Guild Award for Best First Novel in 1995, and the Deathrealm Award for Best Novel in 1996. Her collection The Flesh Artist was nominated for the Bram Stoker Award (Superior Achievement in a Fiction Collection) in 1994.

Taylor's horror fictions do not usually feature supernatural elements, instead being psychological thrillers about extreme human relationships. Taylor has been called "The Queen of Erotic Horror" by Jasmine Sailing. The online Locus Index to Science Fiction (published by Locus) has also categorized several of her works as "erotic horror". Original short fiction of hers appears in all five volumes of the international anthology series, Exotic Gothic.

She has a B.A. in philosophy. Her early writing included non-fiction travel writing.

== Reception ==
Reviewing Taylor's book A Respite for the Dead, Peter Tennant called it "a compelling and totally engaging story, one in which the strangeness is woven deep into every line of the text." Jess Nevins stated that Taylor "is skilled at portraying dysfunctional human relationships and the price they demand from the innocent and the weak."

== Partial bibliography ==
See the ISFDB listing in external links for a more complete bibliography, including works of short fiction.

=== Novels ===
- The Safety of Unknown Cities (Dark Side Press, 1995; The Mammoth Book of Erotica; Overlook Connection Press, 1999) ISBN 1-892950-12-X
- Sub-Human (1998)
- Eternal Hearts (1999)
- Saving Souls (Onyx, 2002) ISBN 0-451-41043-2
- Dancing With Demons (Necro Press, Ebook 2019) ISBN 1-944703-66-7

=== Collections ===
- The Flesh Artist (1993)
- Close to the Bone (1993)
- Painted in Blood (1996)
- The Silence Between the Screams (2004)
- Fatal Journeys (2014)
- Spree and Other Stories (2018)

=== Omnibus ===
- Sideshow Double #1: Sub-Human/The Colour out of Darkness (1998) with John Pelan

=== Chapbooks ===
- Flame Thrower / Blood Rights (1991) with Ann K. Schwader
- Spree (1998)
- A Respite for the Dead (2014)

=== Anthologies ===
- Triptych (1999) with Edward Lee and John Pelan
- "The Butsudan," Exotic Gothic, Ash-Tree Press, 2007, ed. Danel Olson
- "Tívar," Exotic Gothic 2, Ash-Tree Press, 2008, ed. Danel Olson
- "Sanguma," Exotic Gothic 3, Ash-Tree Press, 2009, ed. Danel Olson
- "Nikishi," Exotic Gothic 4, PS Publishing, May 2012, ed. Danel Olson
- "Djinn's Blood," Exotic Gothic 5, PS Publishing, June 2013, ed. Danel Olson
