= David Punter =

David Punter (born 19 November 1949, in Harrow, London) is Professor of English at the University of Bristol. He is the author of many critical studies, and has been internationally recognised as an expert on Gothic culture.

== Career ==
Punter's academic career commenced as a senior lecturer at the University of East Anglia. He left in 1986 to take up the post of Professor of English and Head of Department at the Chinese University of Hong Kong. In 1989 he was appointed Head of Department at the University of Stirling in Scotland. In 2000 he moved to the University of Bristol, where has been Graduate Dean and Research Director of the Faculty of Arts.

Punter has published twenty-four critical books, four books of poetry, as well as hundreds of essays and articles. His major interest has been in Gothic fiction and the wider culture of the Gothic. He has also published books on prose and poetry from the eighteenth century to the present day and literary theory, deconstruction, psychoanalysis and ‘anti-canon theory’.

In the role of Orator at the University of Bristol, Punter has delivered eulogies for the honorary degrees conferred on Michael Eavis, Julia Donaldson, and Terry Pratchett.

== Academic achievements ==
Punter obtained his BA, MA and PhD at Fitzwilliam College, Cambridge. He has subsequently been awarded a DLitt for published work from the University of Stirling. He is a Fellow of the English Association (FEA); a Fellow of the Higher Education Association (FHEA); a Fellow of the Institute for Contemporary Scotland (FCS); a Fellow of the Society of Antiquaries (Scotland) (FSAScot); and a Fellow of the Royal Society of Arts (FRSA).

Punter currently represents the University of Bristol on the Culture, Arts and Humanities Task force of the Coimbra Group of European Universities. At Bristol he was responsible for the establishment of the Bristol Institute for Research in the Humanities and Arts. Punter chairs the executive board of the International Gothic Association, as well as the editorial board of its journal, Gothic Studies.

== Major publications ==
=== Academic ===
- The Literature of Terror: A History of Gothic Fictions from 1765 to the Present Day, 1980; republished in two volumes 1996, Longman, Vol. 1: The Gothic Tradition, ISBN 0-582-23714-9 Vol. 2: The Modern Gothic, ISBN 0-582-29055-4
- Romanticism and Ideology: Studies in English Writing 1765-1830 (with David Aers and Jonathan Cook), 1981, Routledge & Kegan Paul, ISBN 0-7100-0781-7
- Blake, Hegel and Dialectic, 1982, Amsterdam, Rodopi, ISBN 90-6203-694-5
- The Hidden Script: Writing and the Unconscious, 1985, Routledge & Kegan Paul, ISBN 0-7100-9951-7
- Introduction to Contemporary Cultural Studies (ed.), 1986, Longman, ISBN 0-582-49366-8
- William Blake: Selected Poetry and Prose, ed., 1988, Routledge, ISBN 978-0-415-00666-8
- The Romantic Unconscious: A Study in Narcissism and Patriarchy, 1989, New York University Press, ISBN 0-8147-6612-9
- Selected Poems of Philip Larkin: Notes, 1991, Longman, ISBN 0-582-06564-X
- William Blake: New Casebook, ed., 1996, Macmillan, ISBN 0-312-16032-1
- Gothic Pathologies: The Text, the Body and the Law, 1998, Longman, ISBN 0-312-21260-7
- Spectral Readings: Towards a Gothic Geography, ed., with Glennis Byron, 1999, Palgrave Macmillan, ISBN 0-312-22223-8
- A Companion to the Gothic, ed., 2000. Blackwell, ISBN 0-631-23199-4
- Writing the Passions, 2000, Longman, ISBN 0-582-30459-8
- Postcolonial Imaginings: Fictions of a New World Order, 2000, Edinburgh University Press, ISBN 81-269-0554-9
- 'The Whitsun Weddings' and Selected Poems, Philip Larkin, 2003, Pearson Education, ISBN 0-582-77229-X
- William Blake's 'Songs of Innocence and of Experience', 2003, Longman, ISBN 0-582-78433-6
- The Gothic (with Glennis Byron), 2004, John Wiley & Sons, ISBN 978-0-631-22063-3
- The Influence of Postmodernism on Contemporary Writing: An Interdisciplinary Study (otherwise known as Writing in the Twenty-First Century), 2005, Blackwell, ISBN 0-631-20313-3
- Metaphor, 2007, Routledge, ISBN 978-0-415-28166-9)
- The Midnight Bell by Francis Lathom, ed., 2007, Valancourt Books, ISBN 978-1-934555-12-5
- Modernity, 2007, Palgrave Macmillan, ISBN 978-0-333-91456-4

=== Poetry ===
- China and Glass, 1985
- Lost in the Supermarket, 1987
- Little Red Riding Hood, 1804
- Asleep at the Wheel, 1996, Amani, ISBN 0-9529143-0-1
- Selected Short Stories, 1999. Hub Editions, ISBN 1-870653-78-5

=== Stories ===
- "Carving," Exotic Gothic 4, 2012, ed. Danel Olson, PS Publishing, ISBN 978-1-84863-300-1
