= Reah: Face the Unknown =

1998 video game

Reah
- Developer: Detalion
- Publishers: LK Avalon (EU); GT Interactive (NA); Project Two Interactive; Black Friar
- Engine: V-Cruise engine
- Platform: Windows
- Release: EU: August 1998; NA: March 15, 1999
- Genres: Adventure, puzzle

Reah: Face the Unknown (Polish: Reah: Zmierz się z Nieznanym), known in North America as simply Reah, is a 1998 first-person puzzle-oriented adventure game with a non-linear plot, described as a Myst-clone. It was developed by Project Two Interactive / Black Friar and published by Detalion and LK Avalon. It was distributed by Erbe in Spain on October 10, 1998. It was published by Project 2 Interactive in the Netherlands, and distributed in the U.S. and Canada by GT Interactive in 1999.

The game was originally made in the Polish language before being dubbed into English, and has subtitles available in English, German, French, Dutch, Italian and Spanish. A sequel of the game was released entitled Schizm: Mysterious Journey (a.k.a. Reah II). The game was originally released in two different formats: a CD version and a DVD version.

== Gameplay ==
The game is a first-person perspective puzzle-oriented adventure game. Elements of the gameplay have been compared to Myst, Riven, The 7th Guest, The 11th Hour, and Zork Nemesis.

The game has over 150 scenarios, a supernatural-sounding musical landscape, and a non-linear plot.

== Plot ==
The main player is stranded at a human colony base of a planet named Reah which had been set up to investigate an alien artifact. The player must return home to reveal their shocking discoveries.

== Development ==
=== Conception ===
The game was developed in Poland by LK Avalon and Detalion. The Detalion founders had met in the early 1990s while collaborating with Polish developer-publisher LK Avalon, and soon began working on ambitious projects. The game was intentionally designed to be non-violent so as to appeal to a broader range of players. The full-time team who worked on Reah and its sequel, Schizm: Mysterious Journey, consisted of six people, though the productions had an extended roster of hired help including actors, text writers, and sound designers. Resources were increased in later games due to the industry standards of professional outsourcers, localization and animation studios, while maintaining both quality and low costs.

=== Production ===
The game used the V-Cruise gaming engine, the QMixer sound engine licensed from QSound Labs, and the DVD-ROM version used MP3s from Fraunhofer Institut. Once the gameplay and text were completed by the in-house staff, it was sent to the relevant people to flesh out. However, the staff felt a sense of confusion and uncertainty about their work, and decided that in the future they would hire a professional sci-fi writer to develop the story from the very early stages of production. While this was not the case with Reah, Detalion decided that as a rule of thumb, the story writer should also be the gameplay author.

As the Polish video gaming industry was still in its infant stages, everyone involved in the production knew each other. There were no tertiary courses to teach people the required skills, so they learnt while making games with more experienced colleagues. The small teams in the production of games such as Reah had no issues with communication or bureaucracy that appear in larger organisations.

== Release ==
The Computer Show thought the game could have been a surprise hit upon its original proposed release date of April 1998. PC Action announced the game would be released in August 1998, but PC Zone noted that they had still not received a copy of the game by January 1999, remarking that such was usually indicative of one of two things: that the game is bad and the company is therefore scared to have it sent off for review before it is sold, and that they hadn't yet decided on release dates.

Project Two Interactive revealed in May 1999 that the DVD version of the game would be released in retail outlets in June through GT Interactive's affiliate label program. This version was 10 gigabytes with a compression ratio of 50%, compared to the CD-ROM version which was 3.6 gigabytes over six discs with a compression ratio of 80%. This made the DVD version one of the largest games in the market when it was officially shipped on June 16.

Author Terry Dowling, who was playing Reah at the time, contacted Detalion and was propositioned with writing the sci-fi story of the sequel, Schizm, which he accepted.

In October 2017 digital distributor GOG.com made Reah: Face the Unknown and Schizm: Mysterious Journey available without digital rights management restrictions after the game had been unavailable for sale for a number of years.

== Critical reception ==
Reception

Aggregate score
Aggregator	Score
GameRankings	56%

Review scores
Publication	Score
Adventure Gamers	3/5
AllGame	4/5
Computer Games Strategy Plus	2.5/5
EP Daily	1/10
Game Informer	7.75/10
GamePro	2/5
GameRevolution	C+
GameSpot	4.9/10
IGN	5/10
PC PowerPlay	78%

The game received mixed reviews according to the review aggregation website GameRankings. The general consensus was that the scenery was beautiful and detailed, while the writing and plot were underdeveloped and without forward momentum. Reviews regarding the puzzles and gameplay mechanics were mixed. However most critics felt that despite the downsides, they ultimately had an enjoyable experience.

When reviewing Schizm, Just Adventure's Cindy Kyser commented that its predecessor Reah was "a visually stunning yet dismal game [design and writing] that ranks high on my personal list of 'worst of genre'", adding that Schizm "corrects almost every flaw that made Reah so painful to play". Tap Repeatedly criticised the game's "three too-too-hard endgame puzzles" which when completed led to an unclimactic resolution, and thought that Detalion had committed the same error in Schizm. IGN implied in 2000 that the game was not remembered by the public.
