= Terry Dowling =

Australian writer & journalist (born 1947)

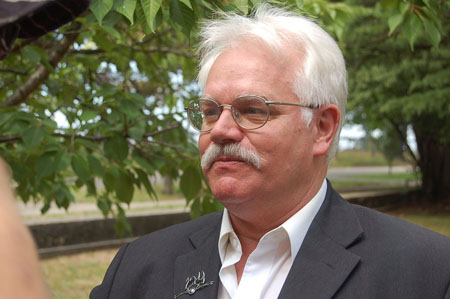
- Dowling in 2007
- Born: 21 March 1947 (age 79); Sydney, Australia
- Occupations: Writer, freelance journalist, critic, editor, game designer, reviewer
- Writing career
- Genre: Science fiction
- Website: www.terrydowling.com

Terence William (Terry) Dowling (born 21 March 1947), is an Australian writer and journalist.

He is primarily a writer of speculative fiction but refers to himself as an "imagier" – one who imagines, a term which liberates his writing from the constraints of specific genres. He has been called "among the best-loved local writers and most-awarded in and out of Australia, a writer who stubbornly hews his own path (one mapped ahead, it is true, by Cordwainer Smith, J. G. Ballard and Jack Vance)."

== Biography ==
=== Early life and work ===
Dowling was educated at Boronia Park Public School, Sydney, 1952–59; Hunters Hill High School, Sydney, 1960–64; and Sydney Teachers' College, 1965–66, following which he was conscripted for national service as an infantryman and admin clerk during the Vietnam War. During these years Dowling wrote poetry and songs and some fiction. Dowling began buying science fiction magazines in the early 1960s and was influenced early by writers such as J. G. Ballard, Jack Vance, Ray Bradbury, Cordwainer Smith and the Horwitz horror anthologies edited by Charles Higham. (Dowling contributes an essay discussing the influence of Higham's horror anthologies on his own writing to Stephen Jones Horror: Another 100 Best Books.) He was also highly influenced by the Surrealist painters, particularly Salvador Dalí, Paul Delvaux, Max Ernst and Giorgio de Chirico.

After teaching for a year at Horsley Park Primary School in Sydney, Dowling matriculated to Sydney University, where he won a scholarship to complete his BA (Hons) in English Literature and Archaeology, then won a research award via which he completed his M.A. (first class Honours) in English Literature. His Masters thesis discussed J. G. Ballard and Surrealism.

During his nine-year stint at university he continued songwriting and performing with rock band The Many Moods of Albert (1966–67), worked as an actor and songwriter with Sydney's Pact Theatre (1972–78), made appearances on Australia's national broadcaster ABC television on some children's programs in the late 1970s and then appeared in an eight-year stint as a musician and songwriter in regular guest appearances on the long-running Australian Broadcasting Corporation children's television program Mr. Squiggle and Friends (1979–1982).

The ABC also financed production of seven of his songs for Amberjack, a musical about a stranded time-traveller, with musicians including Doug Ashdown. The songs are "Glencoe", "The Lure of Legendary Ladies", "Ithaca", "Bermudas", "The Blue Marlin Whore", 'Gantry Jack", and "Minotaur". They were broadcast in 1977 on the ABC/2FC radio program "Talking Point". Dowling has performed these and other songs live at science fiction conventions over the years. Sections of the lyrics from Amberjack are included as linking pieces between the stories in Dowling's 2009 collection Amberjack: Tales of Fear and Wonder (Subterranean Press), including lyrics to songs which were not part of the ABC broadcast.

Dowling's earliest published stories were "Illusion of Motion" and "Oriental on the Murder Express", both published in Enigma, the magazine of SUSFA, the Sydney University SF Society, and "Shade of Encounter" in the second issue of Science Fiction: A Review of Speculative Literature, on which Dowling became assistant editor and short-notice book-reviewer and eventually co-editor (with Van Ikin). Dowling did critical work and continued to play with bands – Temenos (rock band, 1970–72); Gestalt (acoustic band, 1972–75) after taking a teaching position at a Sydney business college. At least one of his rock bands used to play for the patients at a mental hospital at Bedlam Point, near his home – a source for 'Cape Bedlam', location of the Madhouse in the Tom Rynosseros cycle.

=== The 1980s ===
He wrote a science fiction play called "The Tunnel", and eventually sold his first professional story to Omega Science Digest ("The Man Who Walks Away Behind the Eyes", in the May/June 1982 issue).

In the 1980s Dowling met Jack Vance after doing critical work on his oeuvre (Vance later named a planet after him in the novel Throy); Fritz Leiber; and Harlan Ellison, with whom he travelled in the Australian outback. Dowling went on to co-edit (with Richard Delap and Gil Lamont) Ellison's large single-author collection The Essential Ellison (1987; revised/expanded edition 2000).

Some of Dowling's reviews and critical pieces which first appeared in Science Fiction magazine in the 1980s have seen reprint, including "Catharsis Among the Byzantines: Delany's Driftglass" (1982) and the long essay "The Lever of life: Cordwainer Smith as Ethical Pragmatist" (1982).

Dowling began to publish short stories prolifically in the 1980s and was soon recognised as one of Australia's most talented science fiction writers, winning the Ditmar Award multiple times.

=== The 1990s: The 'Rynosseros Cycle' ===
During the 1990s Dowling wrote his four-volume series featuring the hero Tom Tyson (aka Tom Rynosseros), set in a far-future Australia. The first volume, Rynosseros, collected short stories written up to 1990. Further stories of Tyson were written in the early 1990s, with two further volumes of Tyson's adventures appearing in 1992 and 1993. The 'Rynosseros Cycle' would not conclude until publication of the fourth volume in 2007, but stands amongst Dowling's most important work. While reviewing Blue Tyson for SF Commentary, critic and author Damien Broderick concluded: "Australian speculative fiction is rewriting the map of our continent, and Dowling is one of its most accomplished cartographers."

The 'Rynosseros Cycle' is set in a far future Australia where great sandships ("charvolants") roam the outback, and the Ab'O tribes control hi-tech and set protocols which restrict the movements of the "Nationals" (white people). In this future Australia, high technology and mysticism co-exist, and piracy and an intricate social order breed a new kind of hero. Tom Tyson, an Everyman figure who has echoes of the Fool of the Tarot, Tom o'Bedlam, the Green Man and other mythic figures, has emerged amnesiac from an Ab'O punishment place known as the Madhouse, with three images that may provide the key to his identity – a Ship, a Star and a woman's Face. Tyson becomes one of the "Coloured Captains" – seven Nationals permitted by the Ab'O to cross the landscape – and wins his ship Rynosseros in a lottery, thereafter becoming known as "Blue Tyson".

To quote Van Ikin, "In this future Australia, the coastal cities, home of white Australians, are urbanely cosmopolitan centres of culture, while in the interior, around an inland sea, the Ab'O states represent the emancipation of the Aboriginal race whose heritage is both its past and its future destiny. Ab'O Princes use satellites to spy on tribal conflicts, and graceful wind-propelled sand-ships roll across the deserts, giving [the series] its symbol of freedom and inquiry." Dowling has attributed part of the inspiration for the Tom Tyson character to Blue Tyson, a character from one of his high school story fragments, and to the song lyric "Loving Mad Tom" (also known as Tom o'Bedlam), which was drawn to his attention by co-founder of Norstrilia Press, Carey Handfield in 1982.

Compiled works of the Rynosseros Cycle include:

- Rynosseros (Aphelion, 1990)
- Blue Tyson (Aphelion, 1992)
- Twilight Beach (Aphelion, 1993)
- Rynemonn (Coeur de Lion, 2007).

Rynemonn contains a number of stories published previously in magazines, together with the final triptych of Tom stories which first appeared in the Forever Shores collection edited by Peter McNamara and Margret Winch (Wakefield Press 2003). Rynemonn also contains four previously unpublished Tom stories, the linking narrative 'Doing the Line', and 'Swordplay', 'Tesserina and The Target Man' and 'The Bull of September'. Reviews for Rynemonn included: 'Noted Australian wordsmith Dowling brings a close to the adventures of Tom Rynosseros in this collection of 11 stories, three original, with extensive bridging material. "This is the conclusion to the best and most ambitious Australian SF series ever written, and one of the best, ever – period." ' Locus and Australian SF Reader. Terry Dowling received the Peter McNamara award at the 2007 Aurealis Awards for excellence in speculative fiction in part due to the publication of Rynemonn.

Notes: Three linked Tom Tyson stories - "Marmodesse", "The Library" and "First Matter" - were originally written to form a Tyson novel, Malgre, but Dowling abandoned this idea. Two of the stories have been published elsewhere - an abridged edition of "Marmodesse" appeared in Omega Science Digest Jan/Feb 1987). "The Library" was published in Keith Stevenson, ed, X-6, coeur de lion publishing (2009) and in Dowling's collection Amberjack (2010). "First Matter" remains unpublished. "Marmodesse" and "The Library" were reprinted in The Complete Rynosseros.

An edition of The Complete Rynosseros has been published by PS Publishing, UK. The three volumes (initially published as limited signed hardcovers and later as paperbacks) include all previously published Rynosseros stories, together with nearly 30,000 words of supplementary writing on the series and its origins written by Dowling.

"The Only Bird in Her Name”, a story from Rynosseros, was dramatised in 1999 by Hollywood Theatre of the Ear. Adapted for radio by Yuri Rasovsky. Hosted by Harlan Ellison. Narrated by Peter Dennis & Kaitlin Hopkins. Available as a paid download from www.audible.com

A long-uncollected Tom Tyson story, "Down Flowers" was published in Orb (Sept 1999). This appears in The Complete Rynosseros.

During the same decade, Dowling published the collection An Intimate Knowledge of the Night, in which stories are linked by a framework narrative. The protagonists are himself (i.e. Terry Dowling the writer) and a character called Ray, an outpatient from a mental hospital who calls Dowling late at night to talk of synchronicities and to exchange stories. Some critics saw this linking material as 'contrived' but it was praised by others.

Dowling also published the collection of linked science fiction stories Wormwood.

=== 21st century ===
Dowling spent the first several years of the 2000s authoring the scenarios for several PC adventure games published by the Polish video game developer Detalion.

He also expanded The Essential Ellison: "To celebrate the golden anniversary of Harlan Ellison's half a century of storytelling, Morpheus International, publishers of The Essential Ellison: a 35-Year Retrospective, commissioned the book's primary editor, award-winning Australian writer and critic Terry Dowling, to expand Ellison's three-and-a-half decade collection into a 50-year retrospective. Mr. Dowling went through fifteen years of new stories and essays to pick what he thought were the most representative to be included in this 1000+ page collection."

Dowling was awarded a PhD in Creative Writing from the University of Western Australia in 2006 for his horror novel, Clowns at Midnight, and accompanying dissertation The Interactive Landscape: New Modes of Narrative in Science Fiction, in which he examined the computer adventure game as an important new area of storytelling. Clowns at Midnight has been compared to the novel The Magus by John Fowles.

Dowling holds the distinction of having more stories than any other single writer selected for the anthology series Year's Best Horror and Fantasy (edited by Ellen Datlow and Terri Windling) during its twenty-year run from 1988 to 2008.

Dowling retired in 2013 from his position as lecturer at the June Dally Watkins Finishing School. He continues to run writing courses at the University of Sydney – the introductory "Magic Highways" workshops and the more advanced "Dream Castles" workshops.

== Work ==
=== Conventions and workshops ===
He has been Guest of Honour at several Australian science fiction conventions (including Syncon 87 and Swancon 15) and regularly tutors workshops on fantasy writing at venues including the New South Wales Writers' Centre, University of Sydney Centre for Continuing Education, the Powerhouse Museum, the University of Canberra's Centre for Creative Writing, the Perth Writer's Festival and the University of Western Australia Perth International Arts Festival. Some examples of his workshops include: "Marvellous Journeys: Science Fiction & Fantasy Writing" and "Worlds and Futures That Work: What you need and what to avoid". He was a panellist and presenter at Aussiecon 4.

=== Bibliography ===
For a more detailed bibliography see the "Terry Dowling" entry on ISFDB.

==== Novels ====
- Clowns at Midnight. Hornsea, England: PS Publishing. 2010. ISBN 978-1-8486-3085-7. (Note: an excerpt from the novel appeared in Exotic Gothic edited by Danel Olson in 2008.)

==== Collections ====
- Wormwood (Aphelion, 1992). Due for reprint in early 2026 by PS Publishing, along with a new work in the Wormwood universe, Bedlam Rose, as 2-volume signed/slipcased edition.
- An Intimate Knowledge of the Night (Aphelion, 1995)
- The Man Who Lost Red (MirrorDanse, 1995; 2003). Includes "Scaring the Train".
- Antique Futures: The Best of Terry Dowling (MP Books, 1999).
- Blackwater Days (Eidolon, 2000).
- "The Mars You Have in Me" (Eidolon, 2000). Single-story chapbook, limited to 200 signed copies for subscribers.
- Basic Black: Tales of Appropriate Fear (Cemetery Dance, 2006; Ticonderoga Press, 2009)
- Make Believe: A Terry Dowling Reader (Ticonderoga Publications, 2009). Introduction by Simon Brown.
- Amberjack: Tales of Fear and Wonder (Subterranean Press, 2010). Includes the long Tom Tyson story "The Library", which falls chronologically between the events of Blue Tyson and Twilight Beach. "Truth Window: A Tale of the Bedlam Rose", Dowling's first Wormwood story for 17 years, and included here, was first published in 'Eclipse 2' edited by Jonathan Strahan (Night Shade Books, 2008).
- Cemetery Dance Select: Terry Dowling (e-book, 2015). Contents: "The Daemon Street Ghost-Trap"; "The Saltimbanques"; "Stitch"; "One Thing About the Night". A hardcopy limited edition of this title was planned, but remains unpublished.
- The Night Shop: Tales for the Lonely Hours, (Cemetery Dance Publications, 2017), featuring eighteen of his dark fantasy and horror stories in a companion volume to his International Horror Guild Award-winning Basic Black from 2006. It features three original horror stories.
- The Complete Rynosseros: The Adventures of Tom Rynosseros. UK: PS Publishing (March 2020). Vols 1 and 2 contain the complete stories of the Tom Rynosseros Saga, including the previously unpublished "Marmordesse.". Volume 3, entitled Songs from the Inland Sea: Writing the Tom Rynosseros Stories is a complete illustrated history and guide to Dowling's sources of inspiration and experiences in writing the series.

Forthcoming work includes Bedlam Rose (a new novel in the Wormwood universe, scheduled for 2026 publication) and new gatherings of short stories yet uncollected.

==== Works edited ====
- The Essential Ellison with Richard Delap and Gil Lamont (Nemo Press 1987; Morpheus International 1989; expanded reissue, 2000) (Note: The 1987 first trade edition is a '35-year retrospective' of Ellison's short fiction; the 2000 edition is a much expanded '50-year retrospective' and was a runner-up for the 2002 World Fantasy Award for Best Collection.)
- Mortal Fire: Best Australian SF (Coronet, 1993) (with Dr Van Ikin)
- The Jack Vance Treasury (Subterranean Press 2007) (with Jonathan Strahan)
- The Jack Vance Reader (Subterranean Press, 2008) (with Jonathan Strahan)
- Wild Thyme, Green Magic: Selected Stories of Jack Vance (Subterranean Press, 2009) (with Jonathan Strahan)
- Hard Luck Diggings: The Early Jack Vance: Volume One (Subterranean Press, 2010)(with Jonathan Strahan)
- Dream Castles: The Early Jack Vance Volume Two (Subterranean Press, 2011) (with Jonathan Strahan)
- Desperate Days (3 crime novels by Jack Vance)
- Dangerous Ways (3 crime novels by Jack Vance)
- Dowling, Terry & Strahan, Jonathan, eds. (2015). Grand crusades : the early Jack Vance, volume 5. Subterranean Press.

==== Computer games authored ====
- Schizm: Mysterious Journey (2001)(US title: Mysterious Journey: Schizm)
- Schizm II: Chameleon (2003) (US title: Mysterious Journey II)
- Sentinel: Descendants in Time (2004) (also known as Realms of Illusion). (The scenario for this game is based on Dowling's published story "The Ichneumon and the Dormeuse").

==== Anthology and magazine appearances ====
As well as appearances in The Year's Best Science Fiction, The Year's Best SF, The Mammoth Book of Best New SF, The Year's Best Fantasy, The Best New Horror, all five volumes of Exotic Gothic, and The Year's Best Fantasy and Horror (a record eight times; he is the only author to have had two stories in the 2002 volume, one chosen by each editor), his work has appeared in such major anthologies as Centaurus: The Best of Australian Science Fiction, The Best Australian Science Fiction Writing, The Dark, Dreaming Down Under, Gathering the Bones and The Oxford Book of Australian Ghost Stories and in such diverse publications as the prestigious SciFiction, The Magazine of Fantasy & Science Fiction, Interzone, Oceans of the Mind, Ténèbres, Ikarie, Japan's SF and Russia's Game. Exe. His fiction has been translated into many languages and has been used in a course in forensic psychology in the US.

The Tenebres appearance is:

- "Le jeu de l'epouvantrail" ("Scaring the Train", from An Intimate Knowledge of the Night, 1995) in Tenebres No 3, juollet 1998, translated by Daniel Conrad and Benoit Domis. This issue also included "Terry Dowling" [interview] "Entrevue avec Stephen Dedman", translated by Benoit Domis.

==== Selected critical papers ====
- "Alternative Reality and Deviant Logic in J. G. Ballard's Second 'Disaster' Trilogy," Science Fiction 1, No 1 (June 1977): 6–18.
- "The Art of Xenography: Jack Vance's 'General Culture' Novels," Science Fiction 1, No 2 (No 3)(June 1978).
- "Jack Vance's 'General Culture' Novels: A Synoptic Survey," in Tim Underwood and Chuck Miller (eds), Jack Vance (New York: Taplinger, 1980).
- "A Xenographical Postscript," Science Fiction 2 (August 1980).
- "Keith Gersen: The Other Demon Prince". Science Fiction 11 (June 1982) (Winner: 1983 William Atheling Jr. Award for Criticism).
- "The Lever of Life: Winning and Losing in the Fiction of Cordwainer Smith". Science Fiction 10 (1982). Reprint in Damien Broderick and Van Ikin (eds) Warriors of the Tao: The Best of Science Fiction: A Review of Speculative Literature. Wildside Press/Borgo Press, 2011).
- "Catharsis Among the Byzantines: Delany's Driftglass". Science Fiction 17 (Vol 6, No 2), 1984. Reprint in Damien Broderick and Van Ikin (eds) Warriors of the Tao: The Best of Science Fiction: A Review of Speculative Literature. Wildside Press/Borgo Press, 2011).
- "Dancing with Scheherazade: Some Reflections in the Djinni's Glass". In Brian Attebery (ed). Parabolas of Science Fiction Wesleyan University Press,(2013). On science fiction technique, with particular emphasis on the 'Rynosseros Cycle'.
- Science Fiction: A Review of Speculative Literature, Volume 20, Numbers 1–2, Whole Numbers 51-52 Special Double Issue: The Early Work of Terry Dowling (2019).

==== Uncollected short fiction ====
- "Scaring the Train" (1994) in The Man Who Lost Red
- "Beckoning Nightframe" (1996) in Eidolon (Australian magazine) Spring 1996 (ed. Jonathan Strahan, Jeremy G. Byrne, Richard Scriven)
- "Jenny Come to Play" (1997) in Eidolon #25/26, Spring 1997 (ed. Jonathan Strahan, Jeremy G. Byrne, Richard Scriven)
- "He Tried to Catch the Light" (1998) in Dreaming Down-Under (ed. Jack Dann, Janeen Webb)
- "Basic Black" (2000) in Blackwater Days
- "Toother" (2007) in Eclipse One (ed. Jonathan Strahan)
- "Jarkman at the Othergates" (2007) in Exotic Gothic (ed. Danel Olson)
- Clowns at Midnight excerpt (2008) in Exotic Gothic 2 (ed. Danel Olson)
- "Two Steps Along the Road" (2009) in Exotic Gothic 3 (ed. Danel Olson)
- "The Shaddowwes Box" in Ghosts by Gaslight edited by Jack Dann and Nick Gevers. (Harper Voyager, 2011)
- "How the Red Clown Hunts You" Subterranean Press (Winter 2012).
- "Nightside Eye" Cemetery Dance 66 (2012) (magazine) [Includes major interview with Dowling by Danel Olson – "Making Strange: A Conversation with Terry Dowling"].
- "Mariners' Round" in Exotic Gothic 4 (ed. Danel Olson, PS Publishing, 2012)
- "The Madlock Chair" (set in the same universe as "Flashmen").
- "The Sleepover" in Exotic Gothic 5 (ed. Danel Olson, PS Publishing, 2013)
- "The Four Darks" in Fearful Symmetries (ed. Ellen Datlow, 2013).

== Critical reception ==
Critical regard for Dowling's work is extensive. Locus magazine (Nov 1999) said: "Who's the writer who can produce horror as powerful and witty as the best of Peter Straub, SF as wondrously Byzantine and baroque as anything by Gene Wolfe, near-mainstream subtly tinged with the fantastic like some tales by Powers or Lansdale? Why Terry Dowling, of course." It also regards his first book Rynosseros as placing him "among the masters of the field" (August 1990).

In The Year's Best Science Fiction 21 (reprinting Dowling's story "Flashmen"), twelve-time Hugo Award-winning US editor Gardner Dozois called him: "One of the best-known and most celebrated of Australian writers in any genre”, while in the Year's Best Fantasy 4 (reprinting "One Thing About the Night”), editors David G. Hartwell and Kathryn Cramer described him as a "master craftsman" and "one of the best prose stylists in science fiction and fantasy.”

Dowling has also been called "Australia's finest writer of horror" by Locus magazine, and "Australia's premier writer of dark fantasy" by All Hallows (February 2004). The late leading Australian SF personality Peter McNamara (on his SF Review radio show on Adelaide's 5EBI-FM, 23 June 2000) called him "Australia's premier fantasist."For the US edition of Rynosseros (1993), multi-award-winning US Grand Master Harlan Ellison said of Terry: "Here is Jack Vance, Cordwainer Smith, and Tiptree/Sheldon come again, reborn in one wonderful talent. If you lament the chicanery and boredom of so much of today's shopworn sf, then like those of us who've been reading his award-winning stories for a few years now, you'll purr and growl with delight at your great discovery of the remarkable, brilliant Terry Dowling. He comes from Downunder, and he knows how to stand you on your head with story.”

David McKie has written: "Thematically, the work of Terry Dowling ... extends the cyberspace of neuromancers Pat Cadigan, William Gibson and Bruce Sterling to an imaginative future Australia where the human/technology interface fuses Koori psychic technology with communication satellites in a sparse landscape populated by organicised artificial intelligences. In many ways what Dowling achieves in his (Rynosseros sequence) novels answers Donna Haraway's call for the collapse of binary categories between nature and humans, and for more 'transgressive boundaries' where 'people are not afraid of their kinship with animals and machines, not afraid of permanent partial identities and contradictory standpoints."

Brian Attebery offers another critical standpoint:

"Dowling's Rynosseros (1990) and subsequent collections marked a greater maturation of science fictional explorations of Aboriginal culture.Focusing on the adventures of a non-Aboriginal, or 'National' hero operating within this cultural sphere, Dowling's Tom Tyson stories offer sophisticated narrative techniques, memorable images, and troubling themes. These themes usually revolve around conflicts between tradition and innovation or nature and artifice. Dowling does not equate Aboriginality with tradition or nature - he is just as likely to pit advanced Aboriginal technology against national attempts at resurgence or to frame the conflict between tradition and novelty as a struggle between tribal factions. Rynosseros adapts the SF tradition of Cordwainer Smith and Jack Vance - characterised by distant futures; radically altered humanity; technological effects that resemble magic; and exuberant, even baroque language - to the Australian scene. Against the backdrop of Australia's wide, arid interior, Dowling places great sand-ships, talking belltrees, shapeshifters, cyborgs, and visionaries, while overhead, tribal satellites guard against encroachments from the remnants of white population along the coast. Though he received many honours for his evocative and inventive fiction, Dowling did not please all readers with his imagined future ... Criticisms of Dowling fail to note how differently he constructs the relationship between the traditional and the modern. In the Tyson stories, mysticism is not separated from scientific knowledge. Either world view, or both in conjunction, can be found among characters of any race. Dowling, though, did not help matters when he chose the term 'Ab'O' to name his futuristic tribes. The shortened form of Aborigine, though not the most offensive racial epithet available, has been used derisively, more often than not. An extra apostrophe and capital letter did not provide, for many readers, sufficient estrangement of an all-too-familiar term ... As Dowling's series has developed, he has worked very hard to create an alternative vision of racial and tribal identities, to provide a genuinely new concept to go with the estranged term, but it is not an easy task for an outsider to imagine a new form of selfhood for a group that has been so strongly Othered."

== Awards ==
Dowling's fiction has won many national and international awards:

- Eleven Ditmar Awards (including in 1983, 1985, 1986, 1987, 1988 (twice), 1990, 1991, 1992)

As follows:

- "The Man Who Walks Away Behind the Eyes". Ditmar Award for Best Australian Short SF, 1983.
- "The Terrarium". Ditmar Award for best Australian Short SF, 1985.
- "The Bullet That Grows in the Gun". Ditmar Award for Best Australian Short SF, 1986.
- "The Man Who Lost Red". Ditmar Award for Best Australian Short SF, 1987.
- "For as Long as You Burn". Ditmar Award for Best Australian Long SF, 1988.
- "The Last Elephant". Ditmar Award for Best Australian Short SF, 1988.
- "The Quiet Redemption of Andy the House". Ditmar Award for Best Australian Short SF, 1990.
- Rynosseros. Ditmar Award for Best Australian Long SF, 1991.

Prix Wolkenstein, 1991 (Germany).

- Wormwood. Ditmar Award for Best Australian Long SF, 1992.

Readercon Award for Best Collection, 1991 (USA).

- Blackwater Days. Ditmar Award for Best Collection, 2001.

(World Fantasy Award nomination for Best Collection, 2001). 2000 Locus recommended reading List (Locus, Feb 2001, p. 44)

- "The Saltimbanques". Ditmar Award for Best Short Story, 2001.

(World Fantasy Award nomination for Best Short Story, 2001). 2000 Locus Recommended Reading List (Locus, Feb 2001, p. 46)

- Four Aurealis Awards (two of them Convenors' Awards for Excellence), as follows:
  - An Intimate Knowledge of the Night. Aurealis Award for Best Horror Novel, 1996.
  - "Jenny Come to Play". Aurealis Award, Best Horror Short Story, 1997.
  - Antique Futures: The Best of Terry Dowling. Aurealis Convenor's Award for Excellence, 1999.

1999 Locus Recommended Reading List (Locus, Feb 200, p. 40)

- "Breaking Through to the Heroes". Readercon Award for Best Short Story, 1993 (USA).
- The International Horror Guild Award (the horror collection Basic Black (2006) was nominated for a Bram Stoker Award (from the Horror Writers Association) and won the International Horror Guild Award for Best Collection (tied with Glen Hirschberg's American Morons))

The story "Cheat Light" was also nominated for an International Horror Guild Award for best horror Short Story of 2006.

- Schizm: Mysterious Journey (computer game) won the Grand Prix, Graphics, Utopiales 2001 (France).
- The 2007 Australian Shadows Award (2008) for "Toother" from Jonathan Strahan's Eclipse One anthology.

Dowling co-edited (with Richard Delap and Gil Lamont) the 500,000-word single-author collection The Essential Ellison: a 35-Year Retrospective (works by Harlan Ellison). The volume was nominated for the 1987 Hugo Award in the (then) newly created "Other Forms" category; it also won the 1987 Bram Stoker Award for Superior Achievement in a Fiction Collection.

Dowling also won the 1983 William Atheling Jr. Award for Criticism for his essay: "Kirth Gersen: The Other Demon Prince”, Science Fiction: A Review of Speculative Literature, Vol 4, No 2, June 1982. He has received three World Fantasy Award nominations.

== Film adaptations ==
Two of Dowling's short stories, 'The Maze Man" and "One Thing About the Night", are set to be filmed by American director Sergio Pinheiro, director of The Procedure. Pinheiro has also prepared a screenplay titled "The Chamber" based on Dowling's tale "The Bullet That Grows in the Gun".

== See also ==
- List of science fiction editors
