= Tunku Halim =

Malaysian writer

Tunku Halim bin Tunku Abdullah (born 1964) is a Malaysian novelist, short story, non-fiction writer and lawyer.

== Fiction writing ==
The award-winning author's fiction primarily falls within the dark fantasy, and horror genre. His novel Vermillion Eye was a study text at the National University of Singapore. By delving into Malay myth, legends and folklore his writing is regarded as "World Gothic". His novel, Last Breath, is seen as taking a step away from the genre into "a mixture of character drama, satire, alternate history and magic realism". His latest novel, A Malaysian Restaurant in London, is more conventional, being a paranormal love story. He has since written The Midnight Children, a trilogy for middle-grade readers.

He is a recipient of the Fellowship of Australian Writers' short story prize and a three-time winner of Malaysia's Popular-Star Readers' Choice Awards (2015-2017).

== Non-fiction writing ==
The author's recent works focus on Malaysian history for children. This includes History of Malaysia, A Children's Encyclopedia and A Children's History of Malaysia. His translated work Sejarah Malaysia - Ensiklopeida Kanak-kanak won the National Book Award (Anugerah Buku Negara) in 2017.

== Education ==
Tunku Halim went to school at St John's in Kuala Lumpur and later at Cheltenham College in the UK. He qualified as a barrister in the United Kingdom after having obtained his law degree He has been called to the bar in the High Court of Malaya and as a solicitor in New South Wales. He holds a Master of Science degree in Shipping, Trade and Finance (Distinction) from the City University Business School in London.

== Career ==
He practised corporate and conveyancing law at Shearn Delamore in Kuala Lumpur before working for Merit Management Sdn Bhd, the property developer responsible for Tiara Damansara in section 17, Petaling Jaya. He later moved to Sydney and took up a position as Legal Counsel to Oracle Corporation Australia. After a decade in Sydney, he relocated to Hobart, Tasmania where he self-published his encyclopedia. He currently lives in Malaysia. His mid-career retrospective collection of short stories entitled Horror Stories sold 32,000 copies became "the best-selling Malaysian English fiction books of all time". The 25th anniversary edition of his second novel, Vermillion Eye, was recently published.

== Bibliography ==
=== Short story and retrospective collections ===
- The Rape of Martha Teoh & Other Chilling Stories (1997)
- BloodHaze: 15 Chilling Tales (1999)
- The Woman Who Grew Horns and Other Works (2001)
- 44 Cemetery Road (2007)
- Gravedigger's Kiss (2007)
- 7 Days to Midnight (2013)
- Horror Stories (2014)
- Horror Stories 2 (2016)
- The Rape of Nancy Ng - 13 Nightmares (2018)
- Scream to the Shadows (2019)
- My Lovely Skull & Other Skeletons (2022)

=== Short stories in multiple-author anthologies ===
- "Hawker Man" (2007, Dark City 2, ed. Xeus)
- "Keramat" (2008, Exotic Gothic 2, ed. Danel Olson)
- "Biggest Baddest Bomoh" (2009, The Apex Book of World SF, ed Lavie Tidhar)
- "In the Village of Setang" (2012, Exotic Gothic 4, ed. Danel Olson)
- "Quatre Numéros Pour Eric Kwok" French translation of "Four Numbers for Eric Kwok" (2016, Jentayu - revue littéraire d'Asie, tr. Brigitte Bresson, ed. Jérôme Bouchaud)
- "Man on the 22nd Floor" (2016, Little Basket 2016, ed. Catalina Rembuyan, Lee Ee Leen, Ted Mahsun, Tshiung Han See)
- "The Black Bridge" (2018, Best Asian Speculative Fiction, ed. Rajat Chaudhuri)
- "Mr Petronas" (2019, Ronggeng-Ronggeng: Malaysian Short Stories, ed. Edwin Vethamani)
- "Three Dead Chickens" (2019, Horror Without Borders, ed. Oleg Hasanov)
- "Water Flows Deepest" (2022, Destination SEA 2050 AD, ed. Tilda Acuna, Anthony G Mendoza-III, Christine Ong Muslim)

=== Novels ===
- Dark Demon Rising (1997)
- Vermillion Eye (2000)
- Juriah's Song (2008)
- Last Breath (2014)
- A Malaysian Restaurant in London (2015)
- Dark Demon Rising - 20th Anniversary Edition (2017)
- Vermillion Eye - 25th Anniversary Edition (2025)

=== Children's novels ===
- A Vanishing - The Midnight Children - Book 1 (2021)
- Cemetery House - The Midnight Children - Book 2 (2021)
- The Moonlight World - The Midnight Children - Book 3 (2021)

=== Essays in non-fiction anthologies ===
- "Fiction Writing in the Malay World and the Urban Society" (1999, Commentary: The National University of Singapore Society)
- "Margaret Livesey's Eva Moves the Furniture: Shifting the House of Gothic" (2010, 21st Century Gothic: Great Gothic Novels since 2000, ed. Danel Olson)

=== Non-fiction ===
- Everything the Condominium Developer Should Have Told You But Didn't (1992)
- Condominiums: Purchase Investment & Habitat (1996)
- Tunku Abdullah – A Passion for Life (1998)
- The New Golf Paradigm with Kris Barkway (2001)
- A Children's History of Malaysia (2003)
- History of Malaysia – A Children's Encyclopedia (2009)
- History of Malaysia – A Children's Encyclopedia (2nd Edition) (2013)
- So Fat Lah! - 30 Perfect Ways to a Slimmer You (2016)
- The "So Fat Lah!" Cookbook with Christina Hiew (2018)
- A Prince Called "Charlie" (2018)
- A Children's History of Malaysia (2nd Edition) (2019)
