= The Mammoth Book of Erotica =

Erotic literature anthology

- Editor: Maxim Jakubowski
- Language: English
- Genre: Erotic literature anthology
- Publisher: Robinson Publishing, Carroll & Graf
- Publication date: 1994, 2000
- Publication place: United Kingdom, United States
- Media type: Print
- Pages: 624
- ISBN: 0-7867-0787-9

The Mammoth Book of Erotica (ISBN 0786707879) is an erotic literature anthology edited by Maxim Jakubowski that was originally published in 1994, with a revised edition published in 2000. It was published by Robinson Publishing in the United Kingdom (2000 reprint by Robinson imprint of Constable & Robinson), and by Carroll & Graf (Avalon Publishing Group imprint) in the United States.

== Contents ==
- Maxim Jakubowski: Introduction
- Alice Joanou: "A"
- Thomas S. Roche: The Isle of the Dead
- Dion Farquhar: Pure Porn
- Robert Silverberg: Two At Once
- Leonard Cohen: A Long Letter From F.
- Catherine Sellars: Death and Seduction
- Vicki Hendricks: Tender Fruit
- Anne Rice: Beauty's Punishment
- Stewart Home: Ooh Baby, You Turn Me On
- Maxim Jakubowski: The K.C. Suite
- Michael Hemmingson: Hollow Hills
- Marco Vassi: A Carcass of Dreams
- Lisa Palac: Needless to Say
- Cris Mazza: Between Signs
- Michael Perkins: Evil Companions
- Adam-Troy Castro: The Girl in Booth Nine
- Lucy Taylor: The Safety of Unknown Cities
- Mark Pritchard: Lessons in Submission
- Paul Mayersberg: Violent Silence
- Lucienne Zager: The Paris Craftsman
- Denise Danks: Frame Grabber
- David Guy: Married Love
- Samuel R. Delany: Equinox
- Alina Reyes: The Butcher
- Marilyn Jaye Lewis: Chapters in a Past Life
- Lucy Taylor: Baubo's Kiss
- Kathy Acker: Desire Begins
- Clive Barker: The Age of Desire
- Alice Joanou: L'enfer
- Sean O Caoimh: Small Death in Venice
