= Blackwater Days =

Horror stories by Terry Dowling

First edition (publ. Eidolon Publications)

Blackwater Days (Eidolon, 2000) is a collection of horror stories by Australian writer Terry Dowling. The collection won the Ditmar Award for Best Collection 2001, and from it, "Jenny Come to Play" (Eidolon, Spring 1997) won the Aurealis Award for Best Horror Short Story (1997) and "The Saltimbanques" (Eidolon 29/30, 2000) won the Ditmar Award for Best Short Story (2001).

Blackwater Days features seven closely linked tales set around the Blackwater Psychiatric Hospital at Everton in the Hunter Region, featuring Dr Dan Truswell and his two "psychosleuths", Peter Rait and Philip Crow.
