= Basic Black: Tales of Appropriate Fear =

2006 story collection by Terry Dowling

- First edition cover
- Author: Terry Dowling
- Publisher: Cemetery Dance Publications
- Publication date: January 1, 2006
- ISBN: 9781587671234

Basic Black: Tales of Appropriate Fear (Cemetery Dance Publications, 2006) is a collection of horror stories by Australian writer Terry Dowling, a bumper collection in hardcover of the best of his weird and supernatural fiction, which includes two previously uncollected tales. It earned a starred review in Publishers Weekly, which said: "The everyday and ordinary show an unexpected malignant side in this collection of 18 uniquely disturbing tales of the fantastic...one of the year's more satisfying dark fantasy reads."

The story "One Thing About the Night" is about a psychomanteum.
