= John Whitbourn =

English author (born 1958)

John Whitbourn (born 1958) is an English author of novels and short stories focusing on alternative histories set in a 'Catholic' universe. His works are characterised by wry humour, the reality of magic and a sustained attempt to reflect on the interaction between religion and politics on a personal and social scale.

In 2014 a new housing development in the village of Binscombe, Surrey, was named Whitbourn Mews in honour of the author and his The Binscombe Tales series.

== Selected works ==
Whitbourn is an archaeology graduate and published author since 1987. His first book, A Dangerous Energy, won the BBC/Victor Gollancz Fantasy Novel Prize in 1991. In 1562, Elizabeth I suffered from a near-fatal bout of smallpox. In reality she recovered, but that did not occur in the world of A Dangerous Energy and its sequels.

A Dangerous Energy was reviewed as "the first Counter-Reformation science fiction novel", and To Build Jerusalem (1995) furthered the story of that particular alternate history. The Two Confessions, a third and concluding book in the loosely-linked series, The Pevensey Trilogy, was published in 2013.

Whereas A Dangerous Energy focussed on the Church, and To Build Jerusalem on 'high politics', The Two Confessions concerns events in the life of a young would-be industrialist and entrepreneur. Chafing against the reactionary constraints of his civilisation, he stumbles upon a deep secret from the past and is commissioned to solve the associated centuries-old mystery.

Popes and Phantoms (1993) followed the success of A Dangerous Energy and featured the stoic and somewhat chilly 'Admiral Slovo' blazing a trail across the Italian Renaissance – albeit Whitbourn's alternate history version of same. Popes and Phantoms was also published in Russia by Mir Fantastiki. In 2021 the book was republished in its original and substantially larger form as Popes and Phantoms – Redux! Resurgam! complete with new cover.

Whitbourn has published short stories, including the Binscombe Tales series of supernatural stories. They were published in two volume collected form as Binscombe Tales – Sinister Saxon Stories and More Binscombe Tales – Sinister Sutangli Stories by Ash-Tree Press in 1998 and 1999, and reissued in ebook and print editions by Spark Furnace Books in 2011.

His fifth book, The Royal Changeling was published in 1998 by Simon & Schuster's Earthlight imprint. The book recounts the Monmouth Rebellion and Battle of Sedgemoor (1685) while adding a layer of fantasy that brings figures from English mythology to life as both combatants and political forces.

The same company published his trio of books The Downs-Lord triptych, including Downs-Lord Dawn (1999), Downs-Lord Day (2000) and Downs-Lord Doomsday (2002). These depict the adventures of a 17th-century down-at-luck curate who crosses into an alternate Earth where – though all physical features are similar to ours – the hapless local humans are little more than food animals of the monstrous life-form known as Null.

Whitbourn's Frankenstein’s Legions, a Steampunk and zombie-fiction tinged extrapolation of Mary Shelley's classic gothic tale, was published in both print and eBook form in 2012.

Whitbourn's Nothing is True… – The First Book of Farouk, was published in 2018. It comprises a fantasy-tinged and highly unreliable alleged autobiography by the infamous playboy-monarch King Farouk I of Egypt (1920-1965). A companion and concluding volume, And Everything is Permissible – The Second Book of Farouk, covering the deposed King's sybaritic European exile, 1952–65, was published in 2019. Its title completes that of the first book, citing valedictory words attributed to Hassan i Sabbah, twelfth century founder of the Order of Assassins.

In 2020 Whitbourn published The Age of the Triffids, a sequel to John Wyndham's The Day of the Triffids (1951).

2020 also saw publication of his novel BABYLONdon, a historical fantasy set during the Gordon Riots of 1780.

Whitbourn's works were reissued in eBook format by Orion Publishing Group Ltd's SF Gateway in 2013.

Altered Englands, Whitbourn's collected short stories 1990 to date, was published in 2020.

In December 2020 Whitbourn also released a 'Young Adult' Fantasy novel, Amy-Faith & The Stronghold, the first volume of a projected series. A sequel, Amy-Faith & The Enemy of Calm, appeared in 2021.

In 2021 Whitbourn won the Cædmon Prize, awarded annually by the Anglo-Saxon studies society Ða Engliscan Gesiðas (The English Companions), for a poem composed in Old English style and judged to be in accordance with "the spirit of Old English poetry".

In June 2026 Whitbourn’s play, He was a B*gger but I Loved Him, about poet Philip Larkin’s lover and muse, Monica Jones, was performed for a week as ‘Labelled With Love’ at the Old Red Lion Theatre, London.
