= University of Sydney Centre for Continuing Education =

Educational faculty

Centre for Continuing Education
- Established: 1886
- Affiliations: University of Sydney
- Location: Newtown, New South Wales, Australia; 33°53′33″S 151°10′59.9″E
- Website: cce.sydney.edu.au

The Centre for Continuing Education (CCE) is part of the University of Sydney Education and Students portfolio. CCE provides non-award short courses and organisational training for individuals and organisations across a range of professional disciplines. It is located on Missenden Road in Newtown, an inner-west suburb, just south-west of the Sydney city centre. Extension lectures at the university were inaugurated in 1886, 36 years after the university's founding, making it Australia's longest running university continuing education program.

== History ==
The University of Sydney was founded in 1850. Emulating an English movement to extend the benefits of university teaching and to forge links with the community, Walter Scott (1855–1925) inaugurated the University Extension Board lectures in 1886.

At its meeting in July 1892, the University of Sydney Senate accepted a recommendation of the University Extension Lectures Committee that Miss Louisa Macdonald deliver a course of six lectures on "Greek life and art". The Senate also approved payment to Miss MacDonald of an honorarium of £30 for teaching the course, and agreed that the course participants should each pay five shillings.

== Notable tutors ==
- David Stratton, English-Australian film critic and television personality.
- Bill Collins, Australian film critic and television personality.
- Terry Dowling, writer, freelance journalist, award-winning critic, editor, game designer and reviewer.
