= Mysterious Journey II =

2003 video game

Mysterious Journey II: Chameleon (Schizm II: Chameleon)
- Developer: Detalion
- Publisher: The Adventure Company
- Writer: Terry Dowling
- Platform: Windows
- Release: NA: November 24, 2003; EU: March 12, 2004
- Genre: Adventure
- Mode: Single player

Mysterious Journey II, also known as Schizm II: Chameleon (Polish: Schizm II: Kameleon), is an adventure game developed by Detalion, published by The Adventure Company, and the sequel to Schizm: Mysterious Journey. Like the earlier game, the plotline was authored by acclaimed Australian science fiction writer Terry Dowling. While Schizm utilized 360 degree panoramas, Mysterious Journey II uses a first-person shooter interface.

== Story ==
The game begins on a derelict space station. Sen Geder, whom the player controls, awakens from a cryogenic stasis pod, and is interrogated by a pre-recorded holo-message of a mysterious man named Tensa, 214 years after Sen was placed in stasis. Tensa explains that there is no escape, as all non-essential machinery is destroyed, every door and bulkhead is sealed, and the station will fall from its decaying orbit in 16 days. The hologram device is accidentally blown up by a sentient machine named Talen. From there on, Talen helps Sen fly a shuttle down to the planet, where the people below have formed two tribes: The technological Transai, and nature-loving Ansala. From there Sen must solve a myriad of complex puzzles to uncover the truth behind his crime and find out what really happened on Saarpedon.

== Reception ==
Reception

Review scores
Publication	Score
Computer Games Magazine	3.5/5
Computer Gaming World	2.5/5
PC Gamer (US)	36%

In June 2004, Christian Streil of DreamCatcher Interactive's European branch said that "Schizm II has definitely met our expectations" commercially, and that it reassured the company that real-time 3D graphics were "the right track".
