= Simon Kurt Unsworth =

British writer of supernatural fiction (born 1972)

Simon Kurt Unsworth (born 1972) is a British writer of supernatural fiction. Unsworth was born in Manchester, England. He grew up in Chorlton-cum-Hardy. He was educated at Manchester Grammar School and the University of Dundee where he received a Master of Arts degree in Psychology (Hons).

Unsworth's first novel is called The Devil's Detective and Unsworth's most recent novel is The Devil's Evidence, a horror novel set in Hell. James Lovegrove, in a review for the Financial Times, called the novel "an entertaining Dantean spin on the police procedural...The Devil's Detective is damned good".

== Works ==
=== Books ===
- At Ease with the Dead: New Tales of the Supernatural and Macabre, (with others) Ash-Tree Press, 2007. ASIN B000VGTJ0K.
- Creature Feature (with Guy N. Smith and William Meikle), Ghostwriter Publications, 2009. ISBN 1-907190-07-4.
- The Devil's Detective : A Novel. New York : Doubleday, 2015. ISBN 9780385539340
- The Devil's Evidence : A Novel. New York : Doubleday, 2016. ISBN 9780385539364

=== Collections ===
- Lost Places. Ash-Tree Press, 2010. ISBN 9781553101192
- Quiet Houses. Dark Continents, 2011. ISBN 9780983624516
- Strange Gateways. PS Publishing, 2014. ISBN 9781848637269
- The Martledge Variations. Black Shuck Books, 2018. ISBN 9781720995500
- Uneasy Beginnings. With Simon Kurt Unsworth. Black Shuck Books, 2020. ISBN 9781913038502

== Awards ==
- 2008 - World Fantasy Award nomination for best short story for "The Church on the Island"
