= PS Publishing =

Independent book publisher in England

- Founded: 1999
- Founder: Peter Crowther
- Country of origin: England
- Headquarters location: Hornsea, Yorkshire, England
- Publication types: Books, magazines
- Fiction genres: fantasy, science fiction and horror
- Official website: www.pspublishing.co.uk

PS Publishing is an independent book publisher based in Hornsea in the East Riding of Yorkshire, England.

== Background ==
PS Publishing was founded in 1999 by Peter Crowther. They specialise in novella length fiction (20,000 to 40,000 words) from the fantasy, science fiction and horror genres. It has won what The Guardian calls the "prestigious" World Fantasy Award nine times in the categories of Single-Author Collection (for The Very Best of Gene Wolfe, published 2010; Bibliomancy, 2003; and Where Furnaces Burn, 2012), Anthology (Exotic Gothic 4, 2012), Long Fiction (The Unlicensed Magician, 2015), Novel (Illyria, 2007; Osama, 2011), and in the category "Special Award, Professional."

Since June 2004 it has also published the quarterly magazine Postscripts. Since 2012, PS is the publisher of the Exotic Gothic series, edited by Danel Olson. They have also launched the Electric Dreamhouse imprint.

Notable books published by PS Publishing include 20th Century Ghosts by Joe Hill.
