= Schizm: Mysterious Journey =

2001 video game

- Developers: LK Avalon; Detalion
- Publishers: POL: LK Avalon; NA: The Adventure Company; UK: Mindscape
- Writers: Terry Dowling, Tomasz Kołodziejczak
- Engine: V-Cruise engine
- Platform: Windows
- Release: GER: June 15, 2001; POL: September 5, 2001; NA: October 17, 2001; UK: 2002
- Genre: Adventure
- Mode: Single player

Schizm: Mysterious Journey (Polish: Schizm: Prawdziwe Wyzwanie) is an adventure-genre computer game created by Detalion and LK Avalon and published by DreamCatcher Games. Its script was co-authored by Australian science fiction writer Terry Dowling and Polish science fiction writer Tomasz Kołodziejczak. Within a year of release, its sales had surpassed 250,000 units worldwide.

A major distinguishing feature of Schizm is that the player can switch control between the two characters at any time. There are puzzles which require both characters to be performing actions at the same time before they can be solved.

A sequel, Mysterious Journey II (also known as Schizm II: Chameleon), was released. It was also authored by Terry Dowling. Another sequel, Nemezis: Mysterious Journey III, was released on July 8, 2021.

== Story ==
Sam and Hannah are piloting a spaceship carrying supplies to a scientific expedition on the planet Argilus. Arriving at the planet they lose control of the ship and are forced to abandon it in escape pods.

The two become separated at this point and find themselves on an apparently uninhabited planet – Sam lands in an aerial "city" made up of tethered balloons or airships. Hannah finds herself in a town built on a large, free-floating island. The two characters are at first unable to communicate but this becomes possible later when they arrive in the same area.

The objective is to get both characters to Matia's Zone, which is achieved by solving (sometimes very difficult) puzzles to get the alien Argilan technology working. Once in Matia's Zone, the characters must work together to solve the final puzzle and escape the planet – and find the answer to the riddle of the missing Argilans.

== Areas of Argilus ==
Living Ships

This is where Hannah Grant starts her journey of Schizm. Her starting locations differ between the CD and DVD version. On the CD, she starts on a narrow catwalk leading up, but on the DVD version, Hannah begins on a wide island with benches and walkways, leading to the catwalk. From what the player can see, it is quite evident that these organic structures form a village for most, if not all, the Argilans. Gazebos, tentacles, elevators, benches, curly stone formations, and plants are all over the place, and some of the villagers' houses bear things outside of them such as pools of greenish liquid, gourds in boxes (which seem to also grow on the living island walls), pillows and pottery, or bee-like insects swarming around odd, tuber-like structures. (a picture of said insect can be seen in one of their locations) And in the DVD version, an adult version of this insect can be seen sweeping through the player's view with a whooshing sound, and several of them hover in certain areas.

One villager, who appears to know English language, helps Sam when arriving perform a Matia ritual. (more info can be seen below) However, the balance on his Oil reservoir seems to be broken, as the number 6 on its scale is missing. Sam does not take to this well, though the gardener seems to use this issue to test Sam.

According to the manual, Science Base Two was set up here in a location titled "Symphony Harbor", supervised by Dr. Gustav Tomlin. His mission log is revealed in the DVD version, and during Hannah's tour, Tomlin appears as a Matia ghost, explaining that Living Ships can be operated via coordinates on special plaques. "They change all the time. Old ones won't work now. Look for new ones, the new coordinates..." This is proven when said plaques are shown with red 'X's on a pair of Argilan numbers, while another pair are clear.

Bosh's Tunnels

This is by far the largest area of the game, next to Matia's zone. Vaguely as the title suggests, This location is probably where the Argilans came to worship. The area seems to be built into a massive plateau, hundreds of meters high. The topmost area appears to be an aircraft landing area, used by Sam Mainey to land his catfish balloon. That place seems to be rarely used, evidenced by platforms of rusting metal around the main docking clamp. Upon exiting said blimp, Hannah can now reach Sam through their radios.

Further on is an ornate foyer with 3-paneled doors, beyond which turns out to be an enormous temple lined with bizarre minarets, similar to those used on Russian and Arabian temples on Earth. Nearby are two objects: A golden sextant for performing the ritual, "Hermat's pillars", and a steam-powered monorail tram. The latter leads to a small cavern in the plateau itself, containing eight brass "prayer-grinders", used to make prayers for the Argilans. Strangely, spinning these devices actually make sounds that resemble voices. As Sam suggests, these objects are similar to Buddhist Prayer wheels. Later on, smaller groups in the temple turn out to be used not only for prayers, but also as passwords for unlocking barriers.

Beyond the temple and monorail is Science Base One, run by Dr. Angela Davies, surrounded by huge radio dishes. Dr. Mainey points out that the base appears to be "deliberately cut off", causes unknown, but perhaps done by a collapse in the temple structure, evidenced by broken architecture near the edge. The monorail may have led to Base One, but no track is visible presently.

Inside the temple itself is a maze of cloisters with prayer grinder sets lining the walls, dimly lit by lanterns. Most of the area seems to be old and in disrepair. At one end of the temple is a room with candles, a mural with what seems to be a Chinese or Buddhist human, and two stone tablets with images of a wasp (like the one from Hannah's starting area) and an ornate pattern with the Argilan number "9" in its center. Both of these make another ritual: a task for buying precious oil from a gardener, and bringing it to this temple.

The second floor of the temple is quite sparse, containing nothing but a safe holding a detalion (glass in a metal circle, and also a vague reference to the game's company) with Living Ship coordinates for Matia's Zone. On the opposite wall is a mural of a man using the golden sextant outside the temple facing a metal tower and a strange formula for using the sextant This safe's combination results from solving the ritual "Hermat's pillars". Another room, only accessible in the DVD version, seems to have caved in, but Angela Davies' mission log lies on its threshold. Activating it reveals a huge amount of Schizm's back story. Hardly anything else is accessible due to the fact that many rooms and corridors are caved in or boarded up.

The temple's center contains a staggering amount of rain water engulfing the floor (if there ever is or was one), a strange wicker bridge, and a massive statue of what resembles a football player from the famous Heisman Trophy perched on a chair above a lotus flower. It is there that a recurring Argilan priest provides a clue to reaching a new area by mimicking the prayer grinders. Copying this event opens a staircase beneath a large flower petal, done via a pipe in the water connected to a grinder speaker.

The lowest area of Bosh's tunnels, first discovered by Hannah, who notes that it resembles a "major population center", appears to be merely a construction site for more ritual objects. The area is covered by rickety purple scaffolds, water hoses, and building materials. Only three objects have been fully constructed: A dusty footlocker (which cannot be opened in-game, but its insides viewable in one of its trailers), a black stone statue with a built-in lamp, (which Sam connects his detalion to.) a stone tablet that the statue's lamp is aimed at-and when the detalion is attached, OLD Living -ship coordinates for Matia's zone appear in a layout similar to the wood tablets in the living islands area, and a primitive, almost Charles Babbage-like mechanical computer. Nothing is known what this area is meant to be, nor where in the plateau it is. The only clue is dripping water from the temple above.

Balloons

Sam's starting location. Similar to the Living Islands, organic balloons are clustered in a gaseous atmosphere. Base Three was set up here, authorized by Dr. Frances Bremmer. Dr. Richard Hoviz' log is here, as is Bremmer's, the only two logs viewable in the CD version. On the edge of Sam's first balloon area are several compasses and a horn with coils jutting from its bell. The horn itself, with an elaborate gold apparatus behind it, makes automated blasts of air. Next to Hoviz' log is a large device shaped like a musical instrument, which, after pressing gold tabs with the same markings from each compass in a unique pattern, it seems to suck blue pearls used as money from the atmosphere through the horn's coils. The symbols on each tab also create wheezing sounds of alien words, which are also used with the mechanical computer on Bosh. A cable car, leading past several mushroom-shaped hot-air balloons, connects one of the organic balloons to what seems to be a massive flower hovering a few meters from the surface. After experimenting with a pair of gas collection devices and a message from Dr. Bremmer, it turns out that this flower was actually a launch site for several blimps. It seems that the collectors would fill any blimp(s) in the area for flight. By the time Sam arrives, there is only one. Bremmer's log mentions that a scientist named Susan recently used another one. Nothing else is known about this realm.

Matia's Zone

Matia is the most mysterious Argilan area of them all. Everything in this place seems to be in extreme disrepair, but are still working. Watchtowers and buildings are everywhere, and according to Dr. Tomlin, Matia seems to be a "prison zone" for the Argilans. Some god-like force exists here, in two forms: The "Wanderer" and the "Good Servant". There is much debate among which one could be a savior, and the other which could destroy everything.

The topmost level houses a chain-link fence, a tablet open/closed by a wind-up key, and a dock for the Balloon. The middle level discloses two doors with watchtowers, and a track for a mine cart, above which lies a mound with dozens of watchtowers clustered like a termite mound.

The bottommost level shows that the wall with doors and watchtowers is actually a massive hydroelectric buttress dam, with pipes and water valves here for maintenance. in addition, there is a room containing a small prison cell with a concrete floor covered with water from a pipe, its valve sabotaged so said floor cannot be indefinitely dry. In that prison cell lies Dr. Charles Santos, who claims to be on Tomlin's science team. Perched on a landing in this room is a device where two wooden cards can be placed, which, after moving its sliders, reveals the combination to the dam's maintenance doors.

A village titled "Matiani" by Dr. Santos, reached by a strange double drawbridge, contains no people, but instead uses the entrances on each house as portals to shift dimensions, each, when demonstrated by the player, splits the veils of reality between Sam and Hannah bit by bit, until, by nightfall in completion, Sam/Hannah loses radio contact because he is now completely out of phase with him/her. A clue here is revealed by staring at the dam's top after shifting: Twelve lit towers in between the now lighted sentry posts in a unique pattern, requiring to be entered into the mechanical computer on Bosh.

In the DVD version of the game, another village house which is larger than the others, perhaps a living quarters for the former guards, can be accessed from the main elevator, but its door is always locked.

Behind the maintenance doors are two catwalks on the opposite sides with strange circuit boxes meant to raise sections of track. However, placing circuit links either horizontal or vertical activates automated markers at certain places meant to stop the player from doing so. Trial and error must be done to overcome this feat. In-game, working this device allows the player to reach an island at the far end of Matia.

At the very end of Matia is a small island behind the dam with two village houses that have individual pipes with valves jutting from each. Both, accompanied by two long water pipes, lead into an enormous structure: A huge black egg or seed-like structure resting on 4 steel girders fixed to the ground. Underneath this is a button between the pipes that opens or closes the top of this egg, a large radio dish, and a coordinate plaque arch meant for the Balloon to approach here.

When Sam or Hannah follows those instructions and uses information from Bosh's computer, the top of the seed can fully open, revealing a large metallic sphere, which is presumably the true Wanderer. The Balloon can use a winch to carry this sphere to the Living Ship. Doing that allows a bud inside the ship's control room to bloom into a sun-like flower. After Charles Santos is talked to again, he vanishes, showing that he is the human form of the Wanderer, evidenced by him saying prior to vanishing, "We can go now."

== Vehicles ==
Living Island

During her trek through her starting location, Dr. Grant stumbles upon a solitary living ship floating farther away from the others. This one differs in many aspects to the former living islands, such as its material being darker in color, and that its sails are composed of a blue/pink plasma material instead of mesh cloth. Up an elevator is a control room with circular panels. Setting coordinates utilize two panels like a clock. An alcove in the wall holds a plant bud that blooms when the Wanderer from Matia's Zone is deposited. Pressing of that button activates shields of green glass and blasts the island out of the water, turning it into a rocket for Earth and revealing a glowing white object with a fish-like tentacle protruding from it, holding a semicircular fin made out of the same material as the sails.

It seems that this ship is more active than the others in the area where it is found, as in the DVD version, it occasionally makes short surface rumbles which jiggle the lights for a few seconds. And the first time it departs and arrives at other locations, more animations show how it connects and disconnects to locations, and even shows its heart.

In the DVD version, a new device is shown. To the control room elevator's right is a telescope with two wooden crates holding lenses underneath. Placing the right amount and sequence of lenses in the scope reveals a watchtower in Matia's harbor flashing a bulb under it in a way reminiscent of Morse code. All this forms one of two puzzles, required to have the guard flashing the bulb to raise a docking ring and let the Living Ship extend its main tentacle so that Matia's Zone is reachable. Back inside the control room, after this event, a separate control panel there is now usable. Zooming in reveals a circular ring-similar to those used to enter coordinates-with a small knob lever that turns to indicate the number of light flashes, twelve tiny knobs to indicate either "-" or ".", and a button to play your Morse feedback signal, as flashes of neon green light. This is reminiscent of the Navy Signal lamp, in an automated design. However, attempting to repeat the code does nothing. At this point, an Argilan woman appears to explain what your task is, in her own native tongue, and fails. Angela Davies then ports in, explaining that your code must be in its "negative" form, both type and order. (from "-" to "." and vice versa) Finishing that results in access to Matia.

Balloon

After Sam discovers two gas collectors in the Balloon section of Argilus, he manages to get a catfish-like blimp up and running. Inside are two joysticks and a dial, meant to utilize coordinates from golden CDs. A blue button activates this, but if invalid coordinates are entered in the DVD version, the blimp malfunctions and hangs over the ocean landscape surrounding the Living ships. Four sails in the "neck" enable further flight. To land in difficult areas, a metal ring in the nose extends and attaches to any docking clamps or pincers. The blimp's fabric, resembling that of a hot-air balloon, is yellowish with ornate purple patterns on it. During Sam's entrance to Matia, large pieces of the balloon appear to have been stripped away during flight, reasons unknown. After Hannah steers this object over the Wanderer's storage "egg", the balloon reveals a winch in its center to carry it.

== Reception ==
=== Sales ===
Market research firm PC Data reported North American retail sales of 17,528 units for Schizm during 2001, and another 30,298 during the first six months of 2002. According to LK Avalon, it sold above 250,000 units worldwide by the end of September 2002; in early 2003, DreamCatcher announced sales of 150,000 copies in North America alone. PC Data estimated the game's retail sales for the entirety of 2003 at 44,795 units in North America, and reported 5,065 sales for its jewel case SKU and 1,028 for its original box SKU during the first two months of 2004.

=== Critical reviews ===
Reception

Review scores
Publication	Score
Computer Gaming World	3/5
GameSpot	7.8/10
GameSpy	80/100
IGN	3.0/10
PC PowerPlay	55%
Computer Games Magazine	3.5/5

GameSpy's Kevin Rice wrote, "Adventure gamers will be singing the praises of Schizm. Even some of us brain-dead action gamers will take to it as well. Be warned, though, that there's a lot more thought and a lot less twitch."

Schizm was a nominee for GameSpot's 2001 "Best Adventure Game" award, which ultimately went to Myst III: Exile. Similarly, the editors of GameLive PC named Schizm their second-place pick for the best adventure game of 2001–2002; first place went again to Exile.

== Sequels ==
=== Nemezis: Mysterious Journey III ===
Nemezis: Mysterious Journey III

Nemezis: Mysterious Journey III (Previously called Schizm 3: Nemezis), was developed by Detalion Games (Roland Pantola studio, after Detalion S.C's shutdown), published by PlayWay S.A, powered by Unreal Engine 4, and the sequel to Schizm: Mysterious Journey and Schizm II: Chameleon. Unlike the previous games, the plotline is not authored by acclaimed Australian science fiction writer Terry Dowling. The game was released on 8 July 2021 on Steam and GoG.com.

In Nemezis: Mysterious Journey III, you return to the beautiful planet of Argilus (Schizm: Mysterious Journey storyline) as Amia and Bogard, two tourists seduced by a promotional offer, hoping for enjoyable and relaxing vacations.

== See also ==
- Egypt II: The Heliopolis Prophecy
- Atlantis III: The New World
