= Ash-Tree Press =

Canadian publisher

- Founded: 1994
- Founder: Christopher and Barbara Roden
- Country of origin: Canada
- Headquarters location: Ashcroft, British Columbia
- Publication types: Books
- Fiction genres: supernatural and horror

Ash-Tree Press was a Canadian publisher that specialized in supernatural and horror literature.

The press reprinted notable collections of ghostly stories by such writers as R. H. Malden, A. N. L. Munby, L. T. C. Rolt, Margery Lawrence, and Eleanor Scott. It also published newly edited collections of supernatural tales by such writers as John Metcalfe, Marjorie Bowen, Vernon Lee, and Frederick Cowles, and it produced multi-volume sets of the complete supernatural short stories of Sheridan Le Fanu, E. F. Benson, H. Russell Wakefield, Russell Kirk, and A. M. Burrage. In 2001, the press published a collected edition of M. R. James's ghost stories and related writings.

In addition, Ash-Tree Press published new collections of stories by contemporary authors and a series of original anthologies. Awards for these included the 2002 British Fantasy Award for best collection for After Shocks by Paul Finch and the 2004 International Horror Guild Award and 2005 World Fantasy Award for the anthology Acquainted with the Night, edited by Christopher and Barbara Roden.

Ash-Tree Press itself received the 1997 Special Award, Non-Professional, from the World Fantasy Awards and the 1999 Specialty Press Award of the Horror Writers Association.

Christopher and Barbara Roden were the proprietors of both Ash-Tree Press and Calabash Press; the latter published fiction and nonfiction related to Sherlock Holmes.
