= Danel Olson =

Gothic and terrorism literature, film, and media scholar

- Education: B.A., English and Religion; M.A., English; PhD, English Studies
- Alma mater: University of Stirling
- Occupation: College Professor
- Years active: 1993–present
- Employer: Lone Star College
- Known for: Analyses of Monsters, Ghosts, Demons, Zombies, Video Games, Comics, Film, Fantasy, Gothic, and Terrorism in popular culture
- Title: Professor of English and Film

Danel Olson is an American editor and fiction anthologist, video game analyst, historian of comics and genre films/studios, and scholar of Gothic and terrorism literature. His thirteen books have been finalists for the Bram Stoker Award thrice, winning a Shirley Jackson Award and World Fantasy Award twice.

His film companion books are on William Friedkin, Stanley Kubrick, and Guillermo del Toro, the latter of which was a collaboration with the director, and featured with del Toro's installation at the Los Angeles County Museum of Art, Art Gallery of Ontario, and Minneapolis Institute of Art entitled, "At Home with Monsters". His conversations with filmmaking inventors, including Garrett Brown and movie crews and actors from North America, South America, and Europe, appear in print journals, and magazines, books. Olson also routinely interviews assorted novelists and comics' artists for print venues as both retrospectives and glimpses at new releases, including Richard Sala, Neil Gaiman, Nancy Collins, David Mitchell, Terry Dowling twice, Patrick McGrath twice, and Joyce Carol Oates thrice.

== Education ==
He obtained his BA in Religion and English at St. Olaf College and MA in English at University of North Carolina-Chapel Hill, before earning his PhD in English on scholarship at University of Stirling, Scotland, in 2017. His dissertation was titled 9/11 Gothic: Trauma, Mourning and Spectrality in Novels from Don DeLillo, Jonathan Safran Foer, Lynne Sharon Schwartz, and Jess Walter. Splitting his dissertation, he published it in two parts. The first became 9/11 Gothic: Decrypting Ghosts and Trauma in New York City's Terrorism Novels (Lexington Books/Rowman and Littlefield, 2021). The second half released as Gothic War on Terror: Killing, Haunting, and PTSD in American Film, Fiction, and Video Games (Palgrave Macmillan/Springer Nature, 2022). The former volume was a 2022 finalist for the Bram Stoker Award for Nonfiction.

== Research ==
=== Film Studies ===
Olson compiles books and articles on landmark films (Rosemary's Baby, The Exorcist (film), The Shining (film), The Devil's Backbone, Batman Begins, The Dark Knight, The Dark Knight Rises, The Batman (film), Pan's Labyrinth, and Guillermo del Toro's Pinocchio), asking the movies' cast, crew and film scholars why the films become iconic. Introduced by Academy Award winners including Guillermo del Toro and Pixar's Lee Unkrich, his film books' structure and style of investigation-from-the-inside-out led to the volumes being called by The Washington Post "a major contribution to film studies and scholarship." On his collaborative book with Olson, Guillermo del Toro explained, "Sometimes I'm very pleased to find that people are reading the movies the way I consciously wrote them... Some of the essays are quite brilliant in terms of speaking about the movies in the context of social and historical war... examin[ing] tragic situations through a prism of childhood innocence and fear." Anna Taborka agrees with del Toro's characterization, and describes Olson's tome on The Exorcist and all its prequels and sequels (at date of printing) to be largely interested in "discovering more about the social, historical, political, [and] economic contexts in which those films were made." Xavier Aldana Reyes' sees the film studies as operating as dual roles (both general and scholarly): they are "companion" books with lots of interviews for "teachers and those fans who may be interested to find out more about their favourite director and two of his most significant films." Yet Reyes' finds that Olson's more sophisticated reading and "guidance in his questions manages to also steer discussions towards more revealing aspects regarding the perceived psychology and motivations of well-loved characters." Michael Dirda argues that his film books gained notability by their uncommonly large size and completist ambitions. In "750 amazing pages, editor Danel Olson has assembled stills from the movie and casual photos from the set, ... [and] an equal number of interviews with major cast members." Empire Magazine's Chris Hewitt maintains Olson's "series of interviews ... indispensable" with genre directors and collaborators. Noted by reviewers for their recurring interest in and depiction of trauma, David Cowen contends that irony, surprise, and reveals are the key feature of the film studies: for instance, "as the interviews in Olson's collection reveal, the makers of The Exorcist did not expect the public to be so affected." Laurent Vachaud maintains that Olson's books are notable for their re-creation of the psychological tensions that exist on the set and in shooting locations that reflect how masterpieces come with conflict and pain, established by interviews with crew like The Shining's cameraperson Ray Andrew, who was fired for refusing to work overtime without pay, and then was filmed by the Director's daughter Vivian Kubrick as he walked in away shamed post-dismissal. Other critics, including Steven Puchalaski, find the deep-dive approach make an insightful but "exhausting tome (a 50-page essay analyzing The Shining's music? Good Grief!)". Because of the "extensive" and "meticulous approach to information gathering" and "comprehensive recounting of every facet of the films," Fangoria has named his film studies in their "Book of the Month" program.

=== New Gothic Anthologies ===
Olson's six anthologies of new stories from 2007 to 2013, Exotic Gothic, contain what critics charactered as the "New Gothic," featuring over 120 international emerging and established authors charged to create neo-Gothic fiction. Exotic Gothic 3 became a Finalist for the World Fantasy Award, and Exotic Gothic 4 won the World Fantasy Award's Best Anthology. Notable for featuring many authors whose stories became films that fought formula (from Camille DeAngelis, Adam Nevill, Sheri Holman, Nick Antosca, Stephen Susco, to Joyce Carol Oates), Lois Tilton of Locus magazine argued Olson's series compilation "rejects the romanticizing, the domestication of the traditional tropes: ... What we have here is very dark stuff ... disturbing ... really creepy." Gail Brasie remarked on the wider gender representation of authors listed on the Exotic Gothic series' table of contents, and the equal number of male and female contributors in the final volume, because women "are often underrepresented in [other] anthology collections." Brasie also claimed that Exotic Gothic series stood out in the first part of the 21st Century because "there is very little of the 'exotification' of non-white or non-Western spaces and people; where there is, the characters engaging in this thinking are usually destroyed."

Later, Olson turned to collecting non-original fiction, and curating the entire short-fiction oeuvre of a single author. As The Washington Post reports, Olson began compiling and editing "sumptuous hardcover editions of supernatural and fantasy classics. Writing Madness, for instance, gathers Patrick McGrath's "New Gothic" short stories, with an introduction by Joyce Carol Oates, artwork by Harry Brockway, and an afterword by scholar Danel Olson." Writing Madness went on to win the 2018 World Fantasy Award in the Professional Category, but before publication, Olson first asked the author if "he might consider housing all his papers at University of Stirling in Scotland" where the editor was undertaking a PhD. McGrath's "immediate answer was to say Yes." Currently, the Patrick McGrath Archive at University of Stirling (established 2015) holds all the author's books of automatic writing, several drafts of his novels, rare photographs, research materials, a complete set of his first editions, and his comments upon screenplay adaptations of his works, consulted in forming Writing Madness.

=== Neo-Gothic Canon ===
In attempt to establish a neo-Gothic canon, Olson conceived, compiled, and edited a volume of fifty-three original essays from international contributors of what he and they considered the canonical works. The Washington Post concurred with many of the selections this library reference book 21st Century Gothic offered, arguing that it presents "the major works of this genre published in the past dozen years, including Peter Straub's A Dark Matter, Neil Gaiman's The Graveyard Book, James Lasdun's The Horned Man, Joe Hill's Heart-Shaped Box, Carlos Ruiz Zafón's The Shadow of the Wind, Cormac McCarthy's No Country For Old Men, Susannah Clarke's Jonathan Strange and Mr. Norrell, and Elizabeth Kostova's The Historian. These are fascinating books..." Gail Brasie found that 21st Century Gothic inverts and reinvents theories on the neo-Gothic and the monstrous, setting "the relation behind those texts" of the "neo-gothic" canon, evolving an original idea that this writing is not just a "literary style" or "genre" but a "thematic framing."

=== 9/11 Fiction Studies ===
Called by Anthony Magistrale "America's guru of post-9/11 inspired Gothic art and popular culture," Olson's formation and critical treatment of an emerging canon of post-9/11 terrorism literature relies on his original theory of the "Traumagothic." Studies in the Novel characterizes this theory as one where fictive or cinematic characters express their verbally "unrepresentable" trauma through a disguised but coherent system of occult, supernatural, or morbid symbols. Olson records and categorizes their sighting of missing persons, doppelgangers, grotesque violence, ghosts, and the sublime, or their imagining of sex, madness, disrupted time, and the uncanny during the war on terror, and translates it to a language. Caitlin Simmons credited his theory as "the first of what will hope fully become many investigations of the link between trauma studies and 9/11 literary culture." An early critic to diagram Olson's linkages of terrorism/war to the outlines of Gothic nightmare, Lingling Xu drew attention to this theorist's tendency to designate that Joyce Carol Oates' Iraq War novel Carthage "be read as a Gothic novel. Olson demonstrates that the prison that incarcerates [antihero] Brett Kincaid bears a striking resemblance to a Gothic edifice, and Kincaid in conjunction with the Mayfield sisters form a trinity within the framework of a Gothic fairy tale. Concealed transgressions and lingering remorse give rise to a resurgence of the suppressed, while clandestine misdeeds and sins of omission operate in a manner that engenders apparitions ... inherent in the realm of Gothic literature." Johan Anders Höglund compares Olson's re-interpretation of the symbolic meanings of the American Gothic to a new language "articulating an era of grief, guilt, and conflict, from the ruins of the Twin Towers to the atrocities of Abu Ghraib."

== Selected publications ==
=== Edited Anthologies ===
- Exotic Gothic: Forbidden Tales from Our Gothic World (Ash-Tree Press, 2007). ISBN 978-1553101000
- Exotic Gothic 2: New Tales of Taboo (Ash-Tree Press, 2008). ISBN 978-1553101093
- Exotic Gothic 3: Strange Visitations (Ash-Tree Press, 2009). ISBN 978-1553101154
- Exotic Gothic 4: Postscripts #28/29 (PS Publishing, 2012). ISBN 978-1848633001
- Exotic Gothic 5, Volume I (PS Publishing, 2013). ISBN 978-1848636187
- Exotic Gothic 5, Volume II (PS Publishing 2013). ISBN 978-1848636194
- Writing Madness: The Collected Short Fiction of Patrick McGrath (Centipede Press, 2017). ISBN 978-1613471944

=== Edited Literary and Film Criticism Anthologies ===
- 21st-Century Gothic: Great Gothic Novels Since 2000 (Rowman & Littlefield, 2010). ISBN 978-1793638328
- The Exorcist: Studies in the Horror Film (Centipede Press, 2011). ISBN 978-1933618968
- Stanley Kubrick's The Shining: Studies in the Horror Film (Centipede Press, 2015). ISBN 978-1613470695
- Guillermo del Toro's The Devil's Backbone and Pan's Labyrinth: Studies in the Horror Film (Centipede Press, 2016). ISBN 978-1613471012

=== Sole-Authored Critical Studies ===
- 9/11 Gothic: Decrypting Ghosts and Trauma in New York City's Terrorism Novels (Lexington Books/Rowman & Littlefield, 2021). ISBN 978-1793638328
- Gothic War on Terror: Killing, Haunting, and PTSD in American Film, Fiction, Comics, and Video Games (Palgrave Macmillan/Springer Nature, 2023). ISBN 978-3031170188
