= Throes of Joy in the Jaws of Defeatism =

Studio album by Napalm Death
- Released: 18 September 2020
- Recorded: August 2017 – April 2020
- Studio: Parlour Studios in Kettering, England
- Genre: Deathgrind
- Length: 42:26
- Label: Century Media
- Producer: Russ Russell

Napalm Death chronology
Coded Smears and More Uncommon Slurs (2018)	Throes of Joy in the Jaws of Defeatism (2020)	Resentment Is Always Seismic – A Final Throw of Throes (2022)

Singles from Throes of Joy in the Jaws of Defeatism
- 1. "Backlash Just Because" Released: 24 July 2020; 2. "Amoral" Released: 21 August 2020; 3. "A Bellyful of Salt and Spleen" Released: 4 September 2020

Professional ratings
Aggregate scores
Source	Rating
AnyDecentMusic?	8.2/10
Metacritic	86/100
Review scores
Source	Rating
AllMusic	4/5 stars
Blabbermouth.net	10/10
Consequence	A−
Decibel	10/10
Exclaim!	8/10
Kerrang!	4/5
Metal Hammer	4/5 stars
PopMatters	8/10

Throes of Joy in the Jaws of Defeatism is the sixteenth studio album by British grindcore band Napalm Death. It was released on 18 September 2020 through Century Media.

It is the band's first full-length studio album since 2015's Apex Predator – Easy Meat, making it their longest gap between albums.

Metal Hammer named it as the second best metal album of 2020.

== Track listing ==
All lyrics are written by Barney Greenway, except where noted; all music is composed by Shane Embury, except where noted.

Throes of Joy in the Jaws of Defeatism track listing
No.	Title	Lyrics	Music	Length
1.	"Fuck the Factoid"			2:27
2.	"Backlash Just Because"			2:56
3.	"That Curse of Being in Thrall"			3:36
4.	"Contagion"	Embury		4:05
5.	"Joie de Ne Pas Vivre"		Embury; Russ Russell	2:28
6.	"Invigorating Clutch"			4:05
7.	"Zero Gravitas Chamber"			4:03
8.	"Fluxing of the Muscle"			4:33
9.	"Amoral"	Embury		3:05
10.	"Throes of Joy in the Jaws of Defeatism"			2:55
11.	"Acting in Gouged Faith"			3:37
12.	"A Bellyful of Salt and Spleen"		Embury; Mitch Harris; Russell	4:36
Total length:				42:26

Limited mediabook edition and digital edition bonus tracks
No.	Title	Lyrics	Music	Length
12.	"Feral Carve-Up"			2:49
13.	"A Bellyful of Salt and Spleen"		Embury; Harris; Russell	4:36
14.	"White Kross" (Sonic Youth cover)	Thurston Moore	Moore; Kim Gordon; Lee Ranaldo; Steve Shelley	4:06
15.	"Blissful Myth" (Rudimentary Peni cover)	Grant Matthews	Matthews; Nick Blinko; Jon Greville	1:52
Total length:				51:13

Vinyl edition bonus tracks
No.	Title	Music	Length
12.	"Air's Turned Foul in Here"		2:59
13.	"A Bellyful of Salt and Spleen"	Embury; Harris; Russell	4:36
Total length:			45:25

Japanese edition bonus tracks
No.	Title	Lyrics	Music	Length
12.	"Air's Turned Foul in Here"			2:59
13.	"Feral Carve-Up"			2:49
14.	"A Bellyful of Salt and Spleen"		Embury; Harris; Russell	4:36
15.	"White Kross" (Sonic Youth cover)	Moore	Moore; Gordon; Ranaldo; Shelley	4:06
16.	"Blissful Myth" (Rudimentary Peni cover)	Matthews	Matthews; Blinko; Greville	1:52
Total length:				54:12

== Personnel ==
Credits are adapted from the album's liner notes.

=== Napalm Death ===
- Barney Greenway – lead vocals
- Shane Embury – bass, guitars (not credited), backing vocals, noises
- Danny Herrera – drums
- Mitch Harris – guitars

=== Additional musicians ===
- John Cooke – guitars (on "White Kross" and "Blissful Myth")
- Russ Russell – noises

=== Production and design ===
- Russ Russell – production, recording, engineering, mixing, mastering
- Frode Sundbø Sylthe – artwork, layout
- Gobinder Jhitta – photography

== Charts ==
Chart performance for Throes of Joy in the Jaws of Defeatism
Chart (2020)	Peak position
Austrian Albums (Ö3 Austria)	37
Czech Albums (ČNS IFPI)	83
Finnish Albums (Suomen virallinen lista)	35
French Albums (SNEP)	120
German Albums (Offizielle Top 100)	18
Norwegian Vinyl Albums (VG-lista)	31
Scottish Albums (OCC)	33
Swiss Albums (Schweizer Hitparade)	26
