= Exodus: Gods and Kings (soundtrack) =

Exodus: Gods and Kings (Original Motion Picture Soundtrack)

Film score by Alberto Iglesias
- Released: December 9, 2014 (digital); December 16, 2014 (physical)
- Studio: Abbey Road Studios, London
- Genre: Film score
- Length: 78:37
- Label: Sony Masterworks
- Producer: Alberto Iglesias; Vanessa Garde

Alberto Iglesias chronology
The Two Faces of January (2014)	Exodus: Gods and Kings (2014)	Ma Ma (2015)

Exodus: Gods and Kings (Original Motion Picture Soundtrack) is the score album to the Ridley Scott-directed 2014 biblical epic film Exodus: Gods and Kings released digitally on December 9, 2014 and in physical formats on December 16, by Sony Masterworks. Featuring original score composed by Spanish composer Alberto Iglesias, and produced by Harry Gregson-Williams, who also composed additional music, the score was recorded at the Abbey Road Studios in London.

== Reception ==
Timothy Monger of AllMusic wrote "Iglesias has always brought a classy romanticism to his work and it's highly entertaining to hear him pull out all the stops and work in such a grandiose style". James Southall of Movie Wave described it as "enjoyable" as he felt that "parts of it rise above the generic and have something to offer the more discerning listener". Pete Simons of Synchrotones commented it as "a surprisingly coherent score with plenty of highlights".

Justin Chang of Variety and Stephen Farber of The Hollywood Reporter complimented the score as "vigorous" and "overly bombastic". Drew Taylor of IndieWire called that Iglesias' "histronic" score pumps up to "nearly ear-splitting levels". Catherine Shoard of The Guardian panned the score saying it as "horrendous" and it "serves to neuter even the most human moments".

The score was shortlisted as one among the 114 contenders for the Academy Award for Best Original Score for the 87th Academy Awards but was not nominated.

== Track listing ==
No.	Title	Length
1.	"Opening + War Room"	2:38
2.	"Leaving Memphis"	2:03
3.	"Hittite Battle"	4:15
4.	"Returning to Memphis"	2:36
5.	"Moses in Pythom"	1:49
6.	"Nun's Story"	2:17
7.	"The Coronation"	2:28
8.	"Ramses Retaliates"	0:52
9.	"Arm Chop"	1:57
10.	"Goodbyes"	2:41
11.	"Journey to the Village"	2:14
12.	"The Vows"	2:23
13.	"Alone in the Desert"	1:36
14.	"Climbing Mt. Sinai"	2:16
15.	"I Need a General"	3:21
16.	"Exodus"	2:52
17.	"Ramses' Orders"	2:43
18.	"Moses & Nun"	1:47
19.	"Moses' Camp"	2:42
20.	"Ramses' Insomnia"	2:58
21.	"Hail"	2:00
22.	"Animal Deaths"	2:39
23.	"Looting"	1:18
24.	"Ramses' Own Plague"	2:04
25.	"Lamb's Blood"	1:39
26.	"We Cross the Mountains"	2:50
27.	"Into the Water"	3:59
28.	"The Chariots"	1:51
29.	"Hebrews"	0:57
30.	"Tsunami"	5:33
31.	"Sword Into Water"	1:12
32.	"The Ten Commandments"	3:37
Total length:		78:07

== Personnel ==
Credits adapted from CD liner notes:

Album credits

- Composer – Alberto Iglesias
- Producer – Alberto Iglesias, Vanessa Garde
- Additional music – Federico Jusid, Harry Gregson-Williams
- Recording, mixing and mastering – Jose Luis Crespo
- Additional mixing – Geoff Foster, Kirsty Whalley, Peter Cobbin
- Arrangements and programming – Vanessa Garde
- Engineer – George Oulton, Stefano Civetta, Kirsty Whalley, Peter Cobbin
- Assistant engineer – John Alexander, John Barrett, Lewis Jones, Manuel Pájaro, Nicolas Tsabertidis, Santiago Quizhpe
- Music co-ordinator – Ana Eusa
- Design – WLP Ltd.

Performer credits

- Conductor – Nicholas Dodd
- Orchestration – Nicholas Dodd, Alistair King
- Assistant orchestration – Connor Hutton, Greg Hooper
- Orchestra leader – John Bradbury, Perry Montague-Mason
- Contractor – Isobel Griffiths
- Additional contractor – Jo Changer
- Choir – London Voices
- Choir director – Ben Perry, Terry Edwards
- Cello – Dragos Balan, Javier Romero, Jonathan Williams
- Ethnic percussion – Dimitris Psonis, Haïg Sarikouyoumdjian, Helen Greenwood, Jan Hendrickse, Javier Paxariño, Stuart Hall
