= Skeletons (2027 film) =

Upcoming film by JT Mollner

- Directed by: JT Mollner
- Screenplay by: Brian Duffield; JT Mollner
- Based on: "Fail-Safe" by Philip Fracassi
- Produced by: J. J. Abrams; Drew Simon; Jon Cohen; Jack Heller
- Starring: Brie Larson; Kyle Gallner; Daithí Ó Haragáin; Willa Fitzgerald; Ione Skye; John Goodman; Keith Carradine
- Cinematography: Galo Olivares
- Production companies: Infrared Pictures; Bad Robot Productions; Assemble Media
- Distributed by: Sony Pictures Releasing
- Release date: June 4, 2027
- Country: United States
- Language: English

Skeletons is an upcoming American horror film directed by JT Mollner, and written by Brian Duffield and Mollner, based on the short story "Fail-Safe" by Philip Fracassi. It stars Brie Larson, Kyle Gallner, Daithí Ó Haragáin, Willa Fitzgerald, Ione Skye, John Goodman, and Keith Carradine. The film is set to be released by Sony Pictures Releasing on June 4, 2027.

== Premise ==
A young boy slowly begins to discover that his beloved parents are hiding a disturbing secret about his mother's true nature.

== Cast ==
- Brie Larson
- Kyle Gallner
- Daithí Ó Haragáin
- Willa Fitzgerald
- Ione Skye
- John Goodman
- Keith Carradine
- Goran D. Kleut

== Production ==
In 2020, J. J. Abrams came on-board to produce a film adaptation of the short story "Fail-Safe", written by Philip Fracassi; in 2022, Universal Pictures signed a two-year option to produce and distribute the film but they eventually dropped the project.

In May 2025, it was announced that JT Mollner would direct Fail-Safe, from a screenplay by Brian Duffield with Brie Larson starring. In February 2026, the film had been retitled Skeletons. That same month, Sony Pictures acquired worldwide rights to the project for over $25 million at the European Film Market, beating out companies that included Warner Bros. Pictures, Paramount Pictures, and Neon. In May 2026, Kyle Gallner joined the cast. In June 2026, Willa Fitzgerald, Ione Skye and Daithí Ó Haragáin joined the cast. In July, John Goodman and Keith Carradine joined the cast.

Principal photography began on June 22, 2026, in Australia, and concluded in late August.

== Release ==
Skeletons is scheduled to be released in the United States on June 4, 2027.
