= Stephen Barber =

Stephen Barber may refer to:

- Stephen Barber (political scientist) (born 1974), British political scientist
- Stephen Barber (writer), British cultural studies academic
- Stephen Barber (composer) (born 1952), American composer, arranger and musician

== See also ==
- Steve Barber (1938–2007), American baseball player, left-handed pitcher
- Steve Barber (right-handed pitcher) (born 1948), American baseball player, right-handed pitcher
