= Zagava =

German publishing imprint

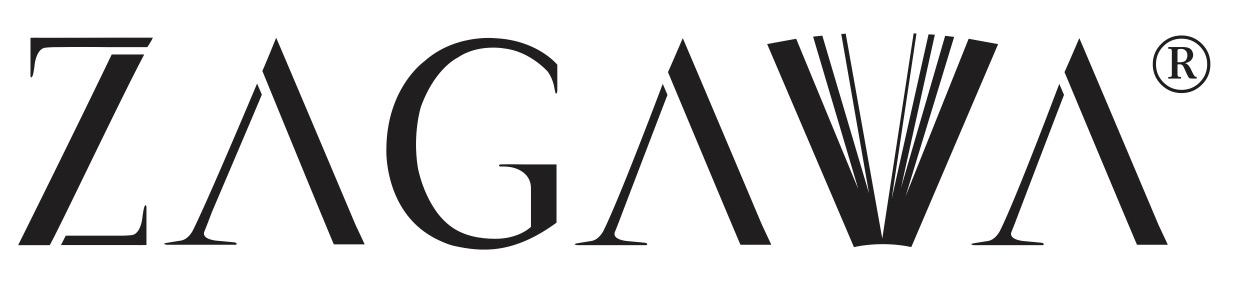
- Founded: 2013
- Founder: Jonas J. Ploeger
- Country of origin: Germany
- Headquarters location: Düsseldorf, Germany
- Publication types: Books
- Fiction genres: Weird fiction, strange tales and novels, supernatural and horror fiction
- Official website: zagava.de

Zagava is a publishing imprint based in Düsseldorf, Germany, focusing on works in the English language within the genres of weird fiction, supernatural, and horror literature, often produced in limited editions. Most of Zagava's books are issued in numbered hardbound versions and frequently in additional special limited lettered sub-editions with special bindings or additional extras. The books are as much about their contents as about the art of fine book-production. Jonas Ploeger is the proprietor of this press. The name of Zagava comes from a story by Edward Gorey, The Osbick Bird.

== Brief history ==
The press began in 2013 with its first publication, Virtue in Danger by Reggie Oliver, marking the start of its publishing journey as a collaborative venture.

Jonas Ploeger’s involvement in the book trade began in 2002 with the launch of an antiquarian online bookstore - Antiquariat Bücherwelten. However, his primary profession at the time, and currently, was as camera operator and photographer.

== Publishing philosophy of Zagava ==
Zagava emphasizes high-quality book production, blending literary content with craftsmanship and exploring themes such as the weird, supernatural, the decadent, and the mystical. Zagava aims to offer readers unique, thought-provoking experiences and surprise them with its creativity.

== Zagava editions ==
Zagava offers its works in various formats, including limited-edition hardcovers and chapbooks, featuring artisanal materials and bindings. Paperbacks also make part of Zagava's publishing.

Lettered edition
Lettered editions are special lettered sub-editions that come along with special bindings or additional extras. These vary on a wide range and often feature creative cover styles, such as hardcover out of copper. Zagava's lettered editions usually are issued with 24 examplars.

Numbered edition
Zagava's numbered editions usually come as an edition of 199 copies where as in the past it may have varied up to 222 copies.

Paperback edition
Paperback editions by Zagava are often unlimited and in A4 size. Furthermore, the paperback are published on high-quality paper with illustrated boards.

Chapbook edition
Infra-Noir
In 2018, a new type of edition series, named "Infra-Noir" was introduced. The Infra-Noirs are printed on finest Amalfi hand-made cotton rag paper with deckled edges and are hand-sewn.

An overview of all published Infra-Noirs
#0 - Craft - D.P. Watt	#16 - Corruption of Heliotrope - Louis Marvick	#32 - Goat Songs - Mark Valentine	#48 - Adrift on Memory Bliss - Arturo Calderon Huapaya
#1 - The Clerks of the Invisible - Mark Valentine	#17 - Four Elemental Invocations - Forrest Aguirre	#33 - The Fenland House - Derek Bainbridge	#49 - A Spectral People - Alcebíades Diniz
#2 - The Idyll is over - Jonathan Wood	#18 - Under Different Stars - Avalon Brantley	#34 - Our World, Like a Charnel House - Jason Rolfe	#50 - Canon for Three September Voices - Martin Ruf
#3 - Codex of Light - Karim Ghahwagi	#19 - A Hive of Pain - D.P. Watt	#35 - Again, The Granite - Charles Schneider	#51 - Stella C - B. Catling
#4 - Posterity - Mark Samuels (author)	#20 - The Purple Thread - Martin Ruf	#36 - Reunion - Peter Bell	#52 - Blackthorn Cottage - Colin Insole
#5 - Ancestor Water - Rebecca Lloyd	#21 - The End of Death - Part 1 - Mark Samuels	#37 - W - John Howard	#53 - House of Silence: An Exposition - Avalon Brantley
#6 - Stained Medium - Mark Valentine	#22 - The End of Death - Part 2 - Mark Samuels	#38 - Death and the Bachelor - R. Ostermeier	#54 - The Emissaries - John Howard
#7 - The Purblind Bards - Timothy J. Jarvis	#23 - The Story of Anja Sigmundsdóttir - Part 1 - Eric Stener Carlson	#39 - The Funeral of Archimimus - O. Jamie Walsh	#55 - The Two Keisukes - Brian Howell
#8 - The Wet Woman - Reggie Oliver	#24 - The Story of Anja Sigmundsdóttir - Part 2 - Eric Stener Carlson	#40 - An Ideal Guest - Gaurav Monga	
#9 A House of Treasures - R. B. Russell	#25 - The Animals That I Have Scarcely Known - Stephen J. Clark	#41 - CAW: Colossal Abandoned World - James Champagne	
#10 - Home Comforts - Rosalie Parker	#26 - The Power That Overshadows - Alex Older	#42 - Towards Nature - Douglas Thompson	
#11 - Rain Against a Face that isn't there - Quentin S. Crisp	#27 - Antediluvian: A Tale of Winter - Thomas Phillips	#43 - A Vision of the architecture of the Obscure - Damian Murphy	
#12 - The Book of Unwona - Colin Insole	#28 - Whom the Gods Destroy - Douglas Thompson	#44 - A Calendar of cherries - Colin Insole	
#13 - New Adelphi - John Howard	#29 - The Invisible Collection - Louis Marvick, Stefan Zweig	#45 - Project Excitement - Golnoosh Nour	
#14 - The Antiquarian's Story - Thomas Strømsholt	#30 Kali Yuga: This Dark and Present Age - Avalon Brantley	#46 - Pictures of Yukio - Brian Howell	
#15 - Reece Mews Underworld - Jeremy Reed	#31 - The Curator of Souls - Peter Bell	#47 - Officer of the Watch - Peter Bell	

Postcards
Many illustrations in Zagava's books were issued as sets of postcards as well.

== Authors ==
Zagava has published works of a total number of 114 authors and artists as of 2024. The following shows an overview in alphabetical order:

- Carl Abrahamsson
- Little Annie
- Derek Bainbridge
- Peter Bell
- Valeria Bianchi
- Nick Blinko
- Avalon Brantley
- Sven Brömsel
- Aurora Buzzetti
- Giulia de Canio
- Adam S. Cantwell
- Eric Stener Carlson
- B. Catling
- James Champagne
- Stephen J. Clark
- S. Cohen
- Andrew Condous
- Brendan Connell
- James Conway
- Quentin S. Crisp
- Dolorosa de la Cruz
- Chris Cummings
- Jackie Cummins
- Joseph Dawson
- Alcebíades Diniz
- Margaret Elphinstone
- Ilna Ewers-Wunderwald
- Michel Faber
- Philip Fracassi
- Richard Gavin
- Karim Ghahwagi
- Ania Goszczyńska
- Helen Grant
- Mandy Haggith
- Martin Hayes
- Brian Howell
- John Howard
- Peter Holman
- Arturo Calderon Huapaya
- Rhys Hughes
- Nigel Humphreys
- Jordan Hunt
- Michael Hutter
- Joris-Karl Huysmans
- Ibrahim Ineke
- Colin Insole
- Justin Isis
- Jane Jakeman
- Derek Jarman
- Timothy J. Jarvis
- Andrew Kerton
- Will Kirchner
- L. A. Lewis
- Andrew Liles
- Rebecca Lloyd
- Gregory Maguire
- Louis Marvick
- Dawn McCarthy
- John S. McFarland
- Chris Mikul
- Daniel Mills
- Gaurav Monga
- Damian Murphy
- Julia Nau
- Alex Neilson
- Dee Norris
- Mary Norris
- Golnoosh Nour
- Alex Older
- Reggie Oliver
- Erin K. Orr
- R. Ostermeier
- Rosalie Parker
- Fabrizio Modonese Palumbo
- Thomas Phillips
- Francesca Puopolo
- Miss Pussycat
- Quintron
- Jeremy Reed
- Colin Rhodes
- Jason Rolfe
- Martin Ruf
- R. B. Russell
- Bertram Rutz
- Jane Ruvolo
- Mark Samuels (author)
- Charles Schneider
- Marcel Schwob
- Richard Skelton
- Michael Siefener
- Florence Sunnen
- Supervert
- Thomas Strømsholt
- Stanisław Szukalski
- Anna Taborska
- Pamela Tait
- Eugene Thacker
- Douglas Thompson
- David Tibet
- Iulia O. Toacaci
- Caroline Tyrell
- Mark Valentine
- Christina de Vos
- Anh Vu
- Cathy Ward
- D.P. Watt
- Paul Wallfisch
- O. Jamie Walsh
- Ron Weighell
- Henry Wessells
- Charles Wilkinson
- J. Kathleen White
- Tod Wodicka
- Jonathan Wood

== Bibliography ==
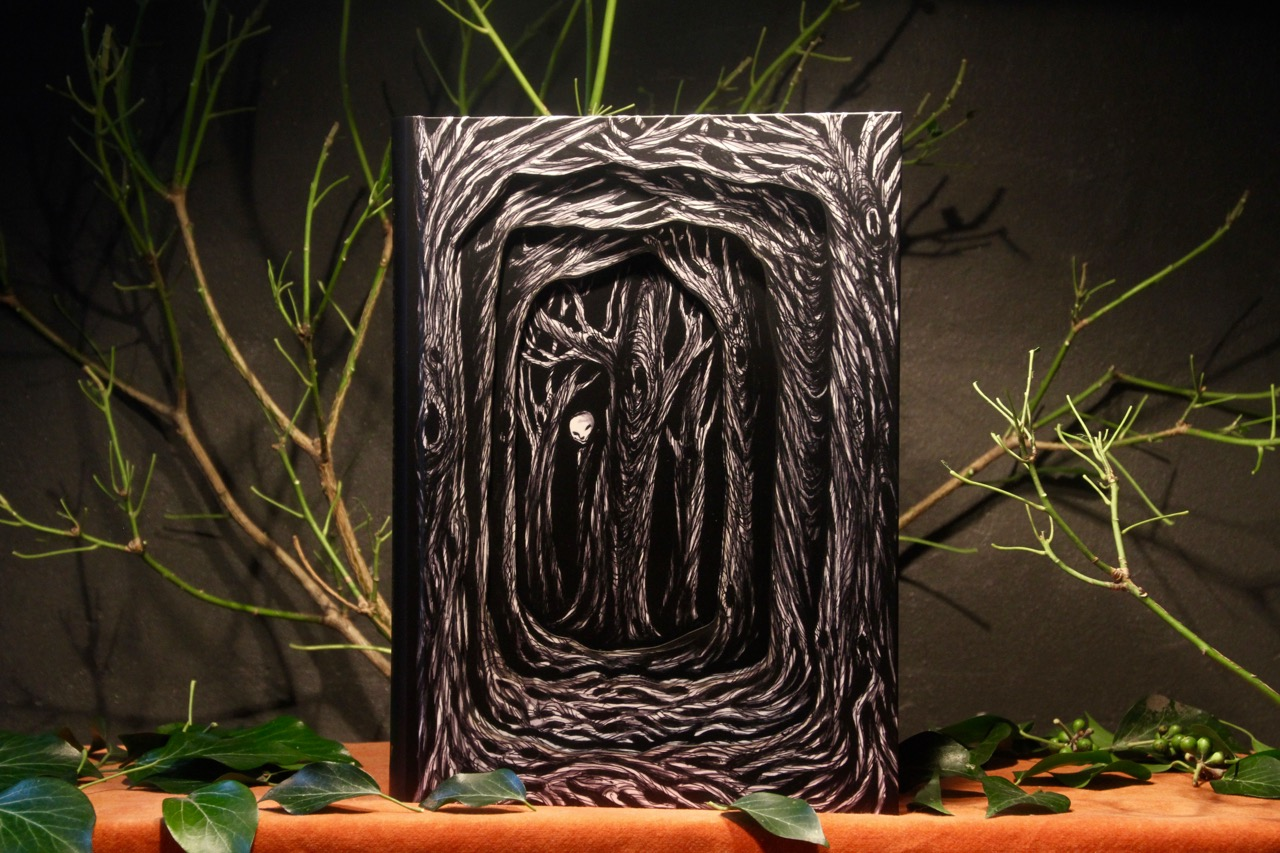
"The Feathered Bough" by Stephen J. Clark

- 2013: "Virtue in Danger" by Reggie Oliver (Zagava Ex Occidente Press)
- 2014: "Dreams of Ourselves" edited by Adolph Moscow aka Dan Ghetu (Zagava Ex Occidente Press) ISBN 978-3-9816093-1-8
- 2014: "Malingerer" by Thomas Phillips (Zagava Ex Occidente Press) ISBN 978- 3- 9816093-5-6
- 2014: "Infra Noir" edited by D.T. Ghetu (Zagava Ex Occidente Press) ISBN 978-3-9816093-6-3
- 2014: "The Stream and the Torrent" by Brian Howell (Zagava Ex Occidente Press) ISBN 978-3-9816093-4-9
- 2014: "A Distillate of Heresy" by Damian Murphy (Zagava Ex Occidente Press) ISBN 978-3-945795-01-9
- 2014: "Letters from Oblivion" by Andrew Condous (Zagava Ex Occidente Press) ISBN 978- 3- 9816093-8-7
- 2014: "Transactions by the Flesh" edited by D.P. Watt and Peter Holman (Zagava Ex Occidente Press)
- 2014: "Wraiths" by Mark Valentine (Zagava Ex Occidente Press), 1st edition
- 2015: "Erith" by Quentin S. Crisp (Zagava) ISBN 978-3-945795-02-6
- 2015: "Wraiths" by Mark Valentine (Zagava), 2nd edition
- 2015: "Cannibals of West Papua" by Brendan Connell (Zagava) ISBN 978-3-945795-00-2
- 2016: "Booklore" edited by Alcebiades Diniz (Zagava) ISBN 978-3-945795-04-0
- 2016: "The Haunting at Tankerton Park" by Reggie Oliver (Zagava) ISBN 978-3-945795-05-7
- 2017: "The House of Silence" by Avalon Brantley (Zagava) ISBN 978-3-945795-07-1
- 2017: "Der Orchideengarten", translated by Helen Grant (Zagava) ISBN 978-3-945795-18-7
- 2017: "The Sketchbook of Stanislaw Szukalski" by Stanisław Szukalski, edited by Jonas Ploeger (Zagava) ISBN 978-3-945795-09-5
- 2017: "The Curious Case of Jan Torrentius" by Brian Howell (Zagava)
- 2017: "The Prozess Manifestations" by Mark Samuels (Zagava) ISBN 978-3-945795-26-2
- 2017: "In This Glasshouse" by Thomas Phillips (Zagava) ISBN 978-3-945795-25-5
- 2018: "The Irregular Casebook of Sherlock Holmes" by Ron Weighell (Zagava) ISBN 978-3-945795-13-2
- 2018: "The Feathered Bough" by Stephen J. Clark (Zagava) ISBN 978-3-945795-14-9
- 2018: "The Bellboy" by Rebecca Lloyd (Zagava) ISBN 978-3-945795-37-8
- 2018: "The Suicide Machine" by Douglas Thompson (Zagava) ISBN 978-3-945795-29-3
- 2018: "The Friendly Examiner - Episode 1" by Louis Marvick (Zagava) ISBN 978-3-945795-16-3
- 2018: "Her Friends" by S. Cohen (Zagava) ISBN 978-3-945795-28-6
- 2018: "And The Darkness Back Again" by Thomas Phillips (Zagava) ISBN 978-3-945795-31-6
- 2018: "Bandit Poet" by Jeremy Reed (Zagava) ISBN 978-3-945795-27-9
- 2018: "The Uncertainty of all Earthly Things" by Mark Valentine (Zagava) ISBN 978-3-945795-30-9
- 2019: "The Delicate Shoreline Beckons Us" by Jonathan Wood, introduction by Mark Valentine (Zagava) ISBN 978-3-945795-40-8
- 2019: "The Friendly Examiner - Episode 2" by Louis Marvick (Zagava) ISBN 978-3-945795-15-6
- 2019: "Alraune des Jugendstils - Ilna Ewers Wunderwald" by Sven Brömsel (Zagava) ISBN 978-3-945795-39-2
- 2019: "The Art of Ilna Ewers-Wunderwald", translated by James Conway (Zagava) ISBN 978-3-945795-43-9
- 2019: "Sight unseen" by Brian Howell (Zagava) ISBN 978-3-945795-43-9
- 2019: "The Meerschaum Pipe" by L. A. Lewis / Charles Schneider (Zagava) ISBN 978-3-945795-47-7
- 2019: "Aornos" by Avalon Brantley (Zagava) ISBN 978-3-945795-54-5
- 2019: "In Delirium's Circle" by Stephen J. Clark (Zagava) ISBN 978-3-945795-48-4
- 2020: "Shrike" by Quentin S. Crisp (Zagava) ISBN 978-3-945795-59-0
- 2020: "Beyond Dead" by Nigel Humphreys (Zagava) ISBN 978-3-945795-67-5
- 2020: "Nick Blinko" by Nick Blinko (Zagava) ISBN 978-3-945795-68-2
- 2020: "The Face of Twilight" by Mark Samuels (Zagava) ISBN 978-3-945795-12-5
- 2020: "Sentimentality" by Thomas Phillips (Zagava) ISBN 978-3-945795-73-6
- 2020: "The Light is Alone" by Thomas Phillips (Zagava) ISBN 978-3-945795-76-7
- 2020: "The Inhuman Ladder" by Karim Ghahwagi (Zagava) ISBN 978-3-945795-80-4
- 2020: "Dungeness Blues" by Derek Jarman & Jeremy Reed (Zagava) ISBN 978-3-945795-57-6
- 2020: "Barking Circus" by Douglas Thompson (Zagava) ISBN 978-3-945795-61-3
- 2020: "Witch-Cult Abbey" by Mark Samuels (Zagava) ISBN 978-3-945795-64-4
- 2020: "The White Hands" by Mark Samuels (Zagava) ISBN 978-3-945795-66-8
- 2021: "The King In The Golden Mask" by Marcel Schwob (Zagava) ISBN 978-3-945795-83-5
- 2021: "The Man Who Collected Machen" by Mark Samuels (Zagava) ISBN 978-3-945795-32-3
- 2021: "Archetypes" by Florence Sunnen (Zagava) ISBN 978-3-949341-00-7
- 2021: "Moriah" by Daniel Mills (Zagava) ISBN 978-3-949341-02-1
- 2021: "Binturong Time" by Quentin S. Crisp (Zagava) ISBN 978-3-949341-06-9
- 2021: "Grandfather" by Avalon Brantley (Zagava) ISBN 978-3-949341-09-0
- 2021: "The Wanderer" by Timothy J. Jarvis (Zagava) ISBN 978-3-949341-07-6
- 2021: "Written in Darkness" by Mark Samuels (Zagava) ISBN 978-3-949341-13-7
- 2021: "Heaven's Hill" by R. B. Russell (Zagava) ISBN 978-3-949341-15-1
- 2021: "Singing and Sighing" by D. P. Watt (Zagava) ISBN 978-3-949341-16-8
- 2021: "The Sketchbooks of Nick Blinko" by Nick Blinko (Zagava) ISBN 978-3-949341-18-2
- 2021: "A Song for Barnaby Jones" by Anna Taborska & Reggie Oliver (Zagava) ISBN 978-3-949341-21-2
- 2021: "Glyphotech and Other Macabre Processes" by Mark Samuels (Zagava) ISBN 978-3-949341-13-7
- 2021: "The Light Inaccessible" by Peter Bell (Zagava) ISBN 978-3-945795-87-3
- 2021: "Shadows of London" by Jonathan Wood (Zagava) ISBN 978-3-945795-89-7
- 2022: "Grotesqueries" by Rebecca Lloyd, Colin Insole, Rosalie Parker, John Howard, Mark Samuels, R.B. Russell, Jane Jakeman, D.P. Watt, Ron Weighell, Caroline Tyrell, Mark Valentine & Reggie Oliver (Zagava) ISBN 978-3-949341-25-0
- 2022: "Fabulous Aesop" by Baby Dee and Friends (Zagava) ISBN 978-3-949341-12-0
- 2022: "Neo-Decadence Evangelion" edited by Justin Isis (Zagava) ISBN 978-3-949341-31-1
- 2022: "Therapeutic Tales" by R. Ostermeier (Zagava) ISBN 978-3-949341-33-5
- 2022: "A Pilgrim Stranger" by Mark Samuels (Zagava) ISBN 978-3-949341-34-2
- 2022: "Oneironauts" by Douglas Thompson" (Zagava) ISBN 978-3-949341-35-9
- 2022: "Lost Eden" by Margaret Elphinstone, Mandy Haggith, Douglas Thompson & D. P. Watt (Zagava) ISBN 978-3-949341-37-3
- 2022: The Invisible Collection" by Stefan Zweig, translated by Louis Marvick (Zagava)
- 2022: "A Dead Man's House" by Avalon Brantley (Zagava) ISBN 978-3-949341-12-0
- 2022: "Don't Let Them Get You Down" by Philip Fracassi (Zagava) ISBN 978-3-949341-28-1
- 2022: "The Second Mask" by Louis Marvick (Zagava) ISBN 978-3-949341-39-7
- 2022: "Marvick Collection" by Louis Marvick (Zagava) ISBN 978-3-949341-40-3
- 2022: "The Lights and other Stories" by Ibrahim Ineke (Zagava) ISBN 978-3-949341-41-0
- 2023: "Red Carpets and the Gutter" by Jeremy Reed (Zagava) ISBN 978-3-949341-24-3
- 2023: "Vestige" by Mark Valentine (Zagava) ISBN 978-3-949341-47-2
- 2023: "The Mirror Remembers" by Stephen J. Clark (Zagava) ISBN 978-3-949341-48-9
- 2023: "A Song in the Night" by Daniel Mills (Zagava) ISBN 978-3-949341-49-6
- 2023: "Woolfy and Scrapo" by Rebecca Lloyd (Zagava) ISBN 978-3-949341-44-1
- 2023: "Ikaho" by Quentin S. Crisp (Zagava) ISBN 978-3-949341-50-2
- 2023: "A Trick of the Shadow" by R. Ostermeier (Zagava) ISBN 978-3-949341-45-8
- 2023: "Pessoa on our mind" by Andrew Condous, Quentin S. Crisp, John Howard, D.P. Watt, Mark Valentine, Colin Insole, Damian Murphy, Rhys Hughes, Jonathan Wood & R. Ostermeier (Zagava) ISBN 978-3-949341-52-6
- 2023: "Tarot" by Michael Hutter (Zagava) ISBN 978-3-949341-53-3
- 2023: "The Egotist" by Philip Fracassi (Zagava) ISBN 978-3-949341-51-9
- 2023: "Child of the Dawn" by Ron Weighell (Zagava) ISBN 978-3-949341-54-0
- 2023: "Two Weird Tales" by Peter Bell (Zagava) ISBN 978-3-949341-55-7
- 2023: "Against the Dreams" by Thomas Phillips (Zagava) ISBN 978-3-949341-56-4
- 2023: "Qx" by Mark Valentine (Zagava) ISBN 978-3-949341-57-1
- 2023: "Every Place Unlike Home" by Charles Wilkinson (Zagava) ISBN 978-3-949341-58-8
- 2024: "The Dance of Geometry" by Brian Howell (Zagava) ISBN 978-3-949341-46-5
- 2024: "The White Protocol" by Avalon Brantley (Zagava) ISBN 978-3-949341-43-4
- 2024: "Vision of Pope Adrian 37th" by Nick Blinko (Zagava) ISBN 978-3-949341-59-5
- 2024: "The Dracula Papers" by Reggie Oliver (Zagava) ISBN 978-3-949341-61-8
- 2024: "Area of Subsidence" by Louis Marvick (Zagava) ISBN 978-3-949341-62-5
- 2024: "A Connoisseur of Grief" by Louis Marvick (Zagava) ISBN 978-3-949341-64-9
- 2024: "The Apparatus of Yearning" by Douglas Thompson (Zagava) ISBN 978-3-949341-67-0
- 2024: "The Black Garden" by John S. McFarland (Zagava) ISBN 978-3-949341-68-7
- 2024: "Maculate Vision and Other Stories" by Louis Marvick (Zagava) ISBN 978-3-949341-69-4
- 2024: "The Haunted Head" by Nick Blinko (Zagava) ISBN 978-3-949341-71-7
