= Death Church =

Studio album by Rudimentary Peni
- Released: 16 May 1983
- Recorded: April 1983
- Studio: Southern Studios
- Genre: Punk rock, anarcho-punk
- Label: Corpus Christi Records

Rudimentary Peni chronology
Farce (1982)	Death Church (1983)	The E.P.s of R.P. (1987)

Professional ratings
Review scores
Source	Rating
Allmusic	3/5 stars

Death Church is the first studio album by British anarcho-punk band Rudimentary Peni. It was released in 1983 on Corpus Christi Records. The recording and mixing took place at Southern Studios in April 1983 and was engineered by John Loder. "Rotten to the Core" is a direct verbal attack against John Lydon and Joe Strummer, accusing them of being hypocrites.

== Track listing ==
- The vinyl release denotes tracks 1–11 as "The Corpus Christi Side", which then lists tracks 12–21 as "The Rudimental Human Side".
1. "¼ Dead"
2. "Blissful Myth"
3. "The Psycho Squat"
4. "Rotten to the Core"
5. "Poppycock"
6. "Cosmic Hearse"
7. "The Cloud Song"
8. "Vampire State Building"
9. "Blasphemy Squad"
10. "When You are a Martian Church"
11. "Pig in a Blanket"
12. "Inside"
13. "Nothing but a Nightmare"
14. "Flesh Crucifix"
15. "Slimy Member"
16. "Love is Not"
17. "Radio Schizo"
18. "Happy Farm"
19. "Alice Crucifies the Paedophiles"
20. "Army of Jesus"
21. "Dutchmen"

== Personnel ==
- Jon (Greville) – drums
- Nick (Blinko) – "mouth-guitar-pen" (vocals, guitar, cover artwork)
- Grant (Brand) – "bass-writing" (bass guitar, lyrics)
