= The EPs of RP =

The E.P.s of R.P.

Compilation album by Rudimentary Peni
- Released: 1987
- Recorded: 1981–1982
- Genre: Punk rock, anarcho-punk
- Label: Corpus Christi Records

Rudimentary Peni chronology
Death Church (1983)	The E.P.s of R.P. (1987)	Cacophony (1988)

Professional ratings
Review scores
Source	Rating
AllMusic	2/5 stars
Punknews.org	3.5/5 stars

The E.P.s of R.P. is a compilation of the anarcho-punk band Rudimentary Peni, released on LP in 1987 on Corpus Christi Records. It contains both of the band's first two 7-inch EPs, Rudimentary Peni and Farce. In 1994, it was reissued on CD on the band's own Outer Himalayan Records.

Tracks 1–12 were taken from the Rudimentary Peni 7-inch EP, recorded at Street Level in 1981 and released in August that year. Tracks 13–22 were from the Farce 7-inch EP, recorded at Southern Studios, London, in 1982, engineered by John Loder, produced by Penny Rimbaud and Rudimentary Peni, and released on Crass Records in July of that year.

== Critical reception ==
AllMusic wrote that "these releases were throttling and brash, shamelessly self-explanatory, and fond of intense speed shifts as they tottered over a pre-grindcore method of handling near chaos." Trouser Press thought that the record contains "some mini-masterworks of alienated vitriol."

== Track listing ==
1. "Media Person"
2. "Him Hymn"
3. "Blind Dogs"
4. "B-Ward"
5. "Crazy Chain"
6. "The Gardener"
7. "Teenage Time Killer"
8. "Hearse"
9. "Dead Living"
10. "Black President"
11. "Tower of Strength"
12. "Play"
13. "Sacrifice"
14. "Cosmetic Plague"
15. "Subdued Violence"
16. "Only Human"
17. "The Bile Ball"
18. "Farce"
19. "Bloody Jellies"
20. "Mice Race"
21. "Defined By Age"
22. "Zero Again"
23. "Bubble"

== Personnel ==
- Jon Greville - drums
- Grant Matthews - bass
- Nick Blinko - vocals, guitar and art
