= The Fits =

British punk rock band

- Origin: Blackpool, United Kingdom
- Genres: Punk rock
- Years active: 1979–1985, 2011
- Labels: Rondelet, Corpus Christi, Trapper, Captain Oi!
- Past members: Mick Crudge; Andy Baron; Kev Halliday "Big" Bill Hughes; Steve Withers; Tez McDonald; Ricky McGuire; Dave Broderick; Gaz Ivin; Paul Bell; Kerry Waite

The Fits were a punk rock band from Blackpool, Lancashire, England, who were active between 1979 and 1985, having several hits on the UK Indie Chart. They reformed in 2011.

== History ==
The Fits formed in Blackpool in October 1979, with an initial line-up of Mick Crudge (vocals), Andy Baron (bass guitar), Kev Halliday (drums), and "Big" Bill Hughes (guitar). They played their first gig only four days after forming, supporting Section 25 at Bispham Community Centre in Bispham. After four gigs, Big Bill was replaced by Steve Withers.The band's first release was a tape on "Beat The System" in 1980 called "You Named Us Tape" which was really a rehearsal recording with an interview with Bill Gumpy tagged on the end. The band's first single, "You Said We'd Never Make It" was recorded in June 1980. Local second-hand record shop owner Barry Lights sold it in his shop, and when the initial run of 1,500 had sold out, reissued it on his Beat The System label, the single eventually reaching number 2 in the Sounds Punk Chart. Increasing exposure saw the band supporting more established punk bands such as the UK Subs around the UK, and they were signed by the Rondelet label in November 1981. Rondelet issued their second single, "Think For Yourself" on New Year's Day 1982. In March 1982, the band entered the studio to record their album You're Nothing, You're Nowhere. The band were not happy with the album, and Halliday and Baron left the band shortly afterwards, to be replaced by Tez McDonald of One Way System and Ricky McGuire of Chaotic Youth. The new line-up had immediate success with the Last Laugh EP, which entered the UK Indie Chart in December 1982 and peaked at number 44.

McGuire left the band in February 1983 (he would later join UK Subs and The Men They Couldn't Hang), his eventual replacement being Gaz Ivin. The band struggled to capitalise on the success of their last EP, not helped by McDonald's drug problem, but their career was kickstarted when John Robb suggested that they might find a suitable home at Crass'/John Loder's Corpus Christi Records. After travelling to meet Crass, the label took them on and released the Tears of a Nation EP, which spent eight weeks in the indie chart, peaking at number 15. The success of the EP led Crudge and Withers to relocate to London. McDonald remained in Fleetwood with his family, and did not travel to all of the band's gigs, with Ogs from Peter and the Test Tube Babies standing in.

A split EP, Pressed for Cash was issued on the Babies' Trapper label, and the band would play several times on the same bill as PTTB. Trapper released two more singles, "Action" and "Fact or Fiction", both of which were indie hits, but the violence that was common at punk gigs at the time affected the band, and they split up in November 1985.

Crudge, Withers, and Ivin as well as Broderick went on to play in Pure Pressure, before all three moved abroad.

In 1995, Captain Oi! records released a 27-track retrospective, The Fits Punk Collection, and this was followed in 1997 by the Too Many Rules collection on the Italian Get Back label.

In December 2011, they announced that they were re-forming for a one-off gig at the Rebellion Festival in their hometown of Blackpool with a line-up of members through the years including Mick Crudge, Dave Broderick recently and over time a session drummer with various named bands, Ricky McGuire and new member Kerry Waite. Kerry Waite left in 2013 and has been replaced by Swedish guitarist and singer Calle Engelmarc (of The Members, Nigel Bennett Band, 96 Decibels, Feral Ghost and Nicolette Street & The Revs).

The band released a 'comeback' record, Offerings at the Altar in 2015.

== Discography ==
Chart placings shown are from the UK Indie Chart.

=== Albums ===
- You're Nothing, You're Nowhere (1982), Rondelet
- The Fits Punk Collection (1995), Captain Oi!
- Too Many Rules (1997), Get Back (Italy)
- Offerings at the Altar (2015), Punkerama

=== Singles/EPs ===
- "You Said We'd Never Make It" (1981), Beat the System
- "Think for Yourself" (1982), Rondelet
- The Last Laugh EP (1982), Rondelet (#44)
- "Tears of a Nation" (1983), Corpus Christi (#15) – containing "Tears of a Nation", "Bravado" and "Breaking Point"
- Pressed for Cash (1984), Trapper (split EP with Peter and the Test Tube Babies)
- "Action" (1984), Trapper (#12)
- "Fact or Fiction" (1985), Trapper (#21)
- Lead on EP (2013)
- "Son of a Gun" (2013)
- "The Visitor" (2014)

=== Tapes ===
- "You Named Us Tape" (1980), Beat the System

=== Compilation appearances ===
- Bravado (2005) "The Ugly Truth About Blackpool" (CD by Just Say No to Government Music)
- Beat the System: The Punk Singles Collection (CD on Cherry Red Records)
- The Only Alternative (1982) (LP on Rondelet Records)
