= Pope Adrian 37th Psychristiatric =

Studio album by Rudimentary Peni
- Released: 1995
- Recorded: 1992, Southern Studios
- Genre: Art punk, anarcho-punk
- Label: Outer Himalayan

Rudimentary Peni chronology
Cacophony (1988)	Pope Adrian 37th Psychristiatric (1995)	Echoes of Anguish (EP) (1998)

Professional ratings
Review scores
Source	Rating
Punknews.org	4/5 stars

Pope Adrian 37th Psychristiatric is a concept album by the band Rudimentary Peni. It was recorded in 1992 and released in 1995. The majority of the album was written while lead singer/guitarist Nick Blinko was being detained in a psychiatric hospital under section 3 of the Mental Health Act 1983. The subject matter of the album relates to the delusions Blinko was experiencing at the time, particularly the idea that he was "Pope Adrian 37th" — a reference to Pope Adrian IV.

Adding to the album's unique sound, the pseudo-Latinized phrase "Papas Adrianus" (Pope Adrian) is looped and can be heard in the background through the entire album.

Blinko provided the artwork for the album.

== Track listing ==
1. "Pogo Pope"
2. "The Pope with No Name"
3. "Hadrianich Relique"
4. "Il Papus Puss"
5. "Muse Sick (Sic)"
6. "Vatican't City Hearse"
7. "I'm a Dream"
8. "We're Gonna Destroy Life the World Gets Higher and Higher"
9. "Pills, Popes And Potions"
10. "Ireland Sun"
11. "Regicide Chaz III"
12. "Iron Lung"
