= Quentin S. Crisp =

British writer (born 1972)

Quentin S. Crisp (born 1972) is a British writer of fiction, essays and poetry. His fiction often has a supernatural dimension, an otherworldly atmosphere or imaginative plot elements that defy a materialist view of realism. Unlike the better-known personality of the same name, this Quentin Crisp was given the name at birth but, being younger, must use his middle initial to disambiguate. Originally from North Devon, Crisp now lives in London. He has a bachelor's degree in Japanese from the University of Durham, a master's degree in philosophy from Birkbeck College, and has spent two periods living in Japan, and Japanese literature is a significant influence in his work.

Crisp was responsible for the Chômu Press, publishing fiction by contemporary authors.

Crisp also writes lyrics, which have been recorded by Kodagain.

His novella Shrike was a 2009 Shirley Jackson Award finalist. The book's introduction claims that it is the first I-novel written in English.

== Bibliography ==
- The Nightmare Exhibition, BJM Press (Chesterfield), 2001 (short stories)
- Morbid Tales, Tartarus Press (Carlton-in-Coverdale), 2004 (short stories)
- Rule Dementia, Rainfall Books (Calne, Wilts), 2005; republished by Snuggly Books, 2016 (short stories)
- Shrike, PS Publishing (Hornsea, UK), 2009 (novella)
- "Remember You're a One-Ball!", Chômu Press, 2010 (novel)
- All God's Angels, Beware!, Ex Occidente Press (Bucharest, Romania) 2009; republished by Chômu Press in 2012 (short stories)
- Defeated Dogs, Eibonvale Press, 2013 (short stories)
- The Cutest Girl in Class, Snuggly Books, 2013 (a novel written in collaboration with authors Justin Isis and Brendan Connell)
- The Boy Who Played with Shadows, L'Homme Récent (Bucharest, Romania), 2015 (memoir; limited to 85 copies)
- Erith, Zagava (Düsseldorf, Germany), 2015 (novella; limited to 100 copies)
- Blue on Blue, Snuggly Books, 2015 (novel)
- The Little One: A Meditation, Zagava Books, 2016 (essay)
- September, Snuggly Books, 2016 (poetry)
- Out There, Mount Abraxas / Ex Occidente Press, 2016 (novella)
- October, Snuggly Books, 2017 (poetry)
- The Paris Notebooks, Snuggly Books, 2017 (memoir)
- Aiaigasa, Snuggly Books, 2018 (memoir)
- Graves, Snuggly Books, 2019 (novel)
- The Flowering Hedgerow, Snuggly Books, 2020 (memoir)
- Rain Against a Face that Isn't There, Zagava Books, 2021 (essay)
- Hamster Dam, Snuggly Books, 2021 (novella)
- Binturong Time, Zagava Books, 2022 (novella)
- Autumn and Spring Annals, Snuggly Books, 2022 (poetry)
- Ikaho, Zagava Books, 2023 (novella)
- I Reign in Hell, Centipede Press, 2024 (collection)
