= The Final Conflict =

Studio album by Conflict
- Released: December 1988
- Recorded: August 1988
- Studio: The Lodge, Suffolk
- Genre: Anarcho-punk
- Length: 40:10
- Label: Mortarhate
- Producer: Colin Jerwood, Stephen Stewart

Conflict chronology
The Ungovernable Force (1986)	The Final Conflict (1988)	Against All Odds (1989)

Professional ratings
Review scores
Source	Rating
Allmusic	3/5 stars

The Final Conflict is an album by the British anarcho-punk band Conflict. The album was recorded at The Lodge Studio, Claret Hall Farm, Clare, Suffolk in August 1988, mastered at Townhouse in September of that year and was released in December by Mortarhate Records. The album features Steve Ignorant of anarcho-punk progenitors Crass providing vocals. It was recorded in the same sessions that produced the bands follow-up Against All Odds as they had three unused days of studio time remaining.

== Track listing ==
1. "Countdown to Confrontation" – 2:36
2. "Let the Battle Commence" – 2:19
3. "I Heard a Rumour" – 3:15
4. "The Cord Is Cut" – 2:11
5. "Barricades and Broken Dreams" – 1:14
6. "Do You Get the Picture?" – 1:38
7. "The A Team" – 5:28
8. "These Things Take Time" – 4:12
9. "Radio Trash" – 3:30
10. "The Final Conflict" – 5:47

== Personnel ==
- Colin Jerwood - Vocals
- Chris Parish - Guitar
- Paul Hoddy - Bass
- Francisco Carreno - Drums, Percussion
- James Van Leer - Brass
- Steve Ignorant - Vocals
- Kerry Bovell - Vocals
