= Conclusion (album) =

Studio album by Conflict
- Released: December 1993
- Recorded: July 1993
- Studios: Alaska Studios, London
- Genre: Anarcho-punk
- Length: 41:49
- Label: Mortarhate
- Producer: Conflict

Conflict chronology
Against All Odds (1989)	Conclusion (1993)	There's No Power Without Control (2003)

Conclusion is an album by the U.K punk rock band Conflict. According to the sleevenotes, it was "recorded in Alaska" which is an allusion to the album's actual location of Alaska Studios in London. The album released in December 1993 by Mortarhate Records. The album was markedly different from prior Conflict releases with a departure from the typical punk sound they were known for in favour of reggae beats, keyboards and melodic interludes. The keys on the album are performed by a close friend of singer Colin Jerwood, Mike Pickstone who would go on to form Schwartzeneggar with Conflict collaborator Steve Ignorant. The titles of the first and final track as well as the closing line of the album allude to Thomas Campbell's 1825 poem "Hallowed Ground".

== Track listing ==
Conclusion track listing
No.	Title	Length
1.	"To Live On in Hearts"	1:41
2.	"The Right to Reply"	5:31
3.	"Someday Soon"	2:09
4.	"No More Excuses"	2:59
5.	"A Declaration of Independence"	6:34
6.	"The Institute of Dreams"	3:44
7.	"Climbing the Stairs"	4:47
8.	"A Question of Priorities"	9:41
9.	"Is Never to Die"	4:43
Total length:		41:49

== Personnel ==
- Colin Jerwood - Vocals
- Ferenc Collins - Guitar
- Marshall Penn - Guitar
- Paul Hoddy - Bass
- Francisco "Paco" Carreno - Drums
- Mark Pickstone - Keys
- Jackie Hanna - Vocals
- Andy Hope - Engineer
