= Increase the Pressure =

Studio album by Conflict
- Released: June 1984
- Recorded: February – April 1984 (Side A); 8 October 1983 (Side B)
- Genre: Anarcho-punk
- Length: 46:53
- Label: Mortarhate
- Producer: Conflict

Conflict chronology
It's Time to See Who's Who (1983)	Increase the Pressure (1984)	The Ungovernable Force (1986)

Professional ratings
Review scores
Source	Rating
Allmusic	4/5 stars

Increase the Pressure is the second album by the British punk rock band Conflict. It was released in 1984 by Mortarhate Records.

== Track listing ==
1. "Increase the Pressure" – 1:58
2. "Law and Order (Throughout the Land)" – 1:02
3. "From Protest to Resistance" – 2:37
4. "Tough Shit Mickey" – 2:42
5. "Punk Inn'It?" – 1:19
6. "As Others See Us" – 1:50
7. "Cruise..." – 9:53
8. "The Positive Junk" – 2:05
9. "The System Maintains" – 2:35
10. "Berkshire Cunt" - 2:43
11. "The Guilt and the Glory" – 3:28
12. ""Stop the City"" – 1:25
13. "One Nation Under the Bomb" – 2:07
14. "Blind Attack" – 1:52
15. "Vietnam Serenade" – 0:58
16. "Blood Morons" – 1:47
17. "Exploitation" – 2:10
18. "Whichever Way You Want It" – 4:40

The first part is a studio recording, but from track eight to eighteen, it is a live recording made at the Brixton Ace, on 8 October 1983.

== Personnel ==
Band

- Colin Jerwood – vocals
- Steve Gittins – guitar
- Big John (born John Clifford) – bass
- Francisco "Paco" Carreno – drums

Production

- Conflict – production
- Russ White - artwork
