= Against All Odds (Conflict album) =

Studio album by Conflict
- Released: 1989
- Recorded: August 1988
- Genre: Anarcho-punk
- Length: 33:05
- Label: Mortarhate
- Producer: Colin Jerwood

Conflict chronology
The Final Conflict (1988)	Against All Odds (1989)	Conclusion (1993)

Professional ratings
Review scores
Source	Rating
Allmusic	2.5/5 stars

Against All Odds is an album by the British punk rock band Conflict. It was released in 1989 by Mortarhate Records.

== Track listing ==
1. "Against All Odds" – 14:09
2. "Slaughter Of Innocence" – 4:30
3. "Assured Mutual Destruction" – 2:39
4. "The Greatest Show On Earth" – 3:19
5. "A Message To Who" – 3:32
6. "A State Of Mind" – 4:56
