= Jeremy Reed (writer) =

British poet

- Born: 1951 (age 74–75); Jersey, Channel Islands
- Education: University of Essex
- Occupations: Poet, novelist, biographer and literary critic
- Awards: Eric Gregory Award (1982); Somerset Maugham Award (1985)
- Website: www.jeremyreed.co.uk

Jeremy Reed (born 1951) is a Jersey-born poet, novelist, biographer and literary critic.

== Career ==
Born in Jersey, Reed has published more than 50 works over 50 years. He has written more than two dozen books of poetry, 12 novels, and volumes of literary and music criticism. He has also published translations of Montale, Cocteau, Nasrallah, Adonis, Bogary and Hölderlin. His own work has been translated abroad in more than a dozen languages. He has been a recipient of the Somerset Maugham Award (1985), the Eric Gregory Award (1982), and awards from the Ingram Merrill Foundation, the Royal Literary Fund and the Arts Council. He has also won the Poetry Society's European Translation Prize.

Reed began publishing poems in magazines and small publications in the 1970s. His influences include Rimbaud, Artaud, Jean Genet, J. G. Ballard, David Bowie and Iain Sinclair. Reed has a long history of publication with Creation Books, Enitharmon Press, Shearsman Books and Peter Owen, and his Selected Poems was published in 1987 by Penguin Books.

He has collaborated with the musician Itchy Ear, and they perform live under the name The Ginger Light. The Ginger Light regularly perform in London at the National Portrait Gallery and the Horse Hospital. Their 2012 album, Big City Dilemma, was described as "a trippy comedown machine, taking you by your collar and dragging you along London pavements".

Reed's BA (hons) degree and PhD are from the University of Essex and he has occasionally taught at that institution and at the University of London.

== Collections of poetry ==
- Target (1972)
- Agate Paws (1975)
- Diseased Near Deceased (1975)
- Emerald Cat (1975)
- The Priapic Beatitudes, the Bat in Violet Lenses, a Phallic Descant: 1 Runic Epiphanies to a Jade Novella (1975)
- Ruby Onocentaur: Six Poems (1975)
- Count Bluebeard (1976)
- Blue Talaria (1976)
- Green: Miscellanea (1976)
- Isthmus of Samuel Greenberg (1976)
- Night Attack (1976)
- Saints and Psychotics: Poems, 1973–74 (1979)
- Bleecker Street (1980)
- Walk on Through (1980)
- Man Afraid (1982)
- A Long Shot to Heaven (1982)
- The Secret Ones (1983)
- By the Fisheries (1984)
- Nero (1985)
- Elegy for Senta (1985)
- Skies (1985)
- Border Pass (1986)
- Selected Poems (1987)
- Escaped Image (1988)
- Engaging Form (1988)
- Prayer (1988)
- The Thread: Written for Kathleen Raines 80th Birthday (1988)
- Madness: The Price of Poetry (1989)
- To Celebrate John Ashbery (1989)
- The Coastguard's House (1990) (with Eugenio Montale)
- The Nineties (1990)
- Dicing for Pearls (1990)
- Lorcas Death (1990)
- Sky Writing (1990)
- Nasturtiums (1991)
- Anastasia in Purple Leopard Spots (1992)
- Volcano Smoke at Diamond Beach (1992)
- Red-Haired Android (1992)
- Black Sugar (1992)
- Around the Day, Alice (1992)
- Artaud (1993)
- Lying Down (1993)
- Turkish Delight: Torriano Meeting House Poetry Pamphlet (1994)
- Torch Lighters (1994)
- Kicks (1995)
- Red Hot Lipstick: Erotic Stories (1995)
- Bitter Blue (1995)
- Listening to Marc Almond (1995)
- Sweet Sister Lyric (1996)
- Pop Poems (1997)
- Angel (1998)
- Brigitte's Blue Heart (1998)
- Claudia Schiffer's Red Shoes (1998)
- For John Heath-Stubbs at Eighty (1998)
- Just out of Reach (1999)
- Quentin Crisp as Prime Minister (1999)
- Patron Saint of Eye-liner (2000)
- Heartbreak Hotel (2002)
- Perry Blake (2003)
- Duck and Sally on the Inside (2004)
- Kiss the Whip (2005) (with Robert Bloch, Henry Clement, Jean-Paul Denard, and Richard Matheson)
- This Is How You Disappear: A Book of Elegies (2007)
- West End Survival Kit (2009)
- Black Russian: Out-Takes from the Airmen's Club 1978-9 (2010)
- Piccadilly Bongo (2010)
- The Glamour Poet Versus Francis Bacon, Rent and Eyelinered Pussycat Dolls (2014)
- The Black Book (2016)
- Red Light Blues (2016)
- Candy 4 Cannibals (2017)
- Shakespeare in Soho (2017)
- Reece Mews Underworld (2021, Zagava)
- Dungeness Blue (2021, Zagava) (with Derek Jarman)

== Criticism and non-fiction ==
- Homage to David Gascoyne (1990)
- Lipstick, Sex and Poetry (1991)
- Delirium: An Interpretation of Arthur Rimbaud (1991)
- Segmenting the Black Orange (1994)
- Waiting for the Man: Biography and Critical Study of Lou Reed (1994)
- Blue Sonata: The Poetry of John Ashbery (1994)
- The Last Star: A Study of Marc Almond (1995)
- The Angel in Poetry (1998)
- Scott Walker: Another Tear Falls (1998)
- Brian Jones: The Last Decadent (1999)
- Angels, Divas and Blacklisted Heroes (1999)
- Caligula: Divine Carnage (2000) (with Stephen Barber)
- Marc Almond: Adored and Explored (2001)
- Saint Billie (2002)
- It Had to Be You: The Poetry of John Wieners (2004)
- Jean Genet: Born to Lose (2005)
- Orange Sunshine: The Party That Lasted a Decade (2006)
- A Stranger on the Earth: The Life and Work of Anna Kavan (2006)
- The Dilly: A Secret History of Piccadilly Rent Boys (2014)
- I Heard It Through the Grapevine: Asa Benveniste and Trigram Press (2016)
- Bandit Poet: London Years (2018)

== Novels ==
- The Lipstick Boys (1984)
- Blue Rock (1987)
- Red Eclipse (1989)
- Inhabiting Shadows (1990)
- Isidore: A Novel About the Comte de Lautréamont (1991)
- When the Whip Comes Down (1992)
- Diamond Nebula (1994)
- Chasing Black Rainbows (1994)
- The Pleasure Chateau (1995)
- The Sun King: Elvis – the Second Coming (1997)
- Dorian: A Sequel to the Picture of Dorian Gray (1997)
- Sister Midnight (1998)
- The Purple Room (2000)
- Boy Caesar (2003)
- The Grid (2008)
- Here Comes the Nice (2011)
- Red Carpet and the Gutter (2021, Zagava)
- Surrender to a Stranger (2023)
