= Cacophony (Rudimentary Peni album) =

Studio album by Rudimentary Peni
- Released: 17 November 1988
- Genre: Art punk, anarcho-punk
- Label: Outer Himalayan Records

Rudimentary Peni chronology
The E.P.s of R.P. (1987)	Cacophony (1988)	Pope Adrian 37th Psychristiatric (1995)

Cacophony is the second studio album by English anarcho-punk band Rudimentary Peni. It was released 17 November 1988 on their own label, Outer Himalayan Records. The album marked a departure from the group’s political lyricism and straightforward hardcore punk, instead weaving together musical experiments and songs into a concept album about the Leif and work of H. P. Lovecraft.

== Track listing ==
1. "Nightgaunts"
2. "The Horrors in the Museum"
3. "The Only Child"
4. "Architectonic and Dominant"
5. "The Evil Clergyman"
6. "Brown Jenkin"
7. "Crazed Couplet"
8. "Sarcophagus"
9. "Lovecraft Baby"
10. "Dream City"
11. "C12 H22 011"
12. "Zenophobia"
13. "Sunset for the Lords of Venus"
14. "Beyond the Tanarian Hills"
15. "Imps of the Perverse"
16. "The Dead Loved"
17. "Periwig Power"
18. "Kappa Alpha Tau"
19. "American Anglophile in the World Turned Upside-Down"
20. "Memento Mori"
21. "Better Not Born"
22. "Arkham Hearse"
23. "The Old Man Is Not So Terribly Misanthropic"
24. "Gentlemen Prefer Blood"
25. "Sonia"
26. "The Day the Universe Ceased (March 15, 1937)"
27. "The Crime of the Century"
28. "Musick in Diabola"
29. "Shard"
30. "Black on Gold"

== Personnel ==
- Nick Blinko – guitar, vocals, cover artwork
- Grant Brand – bass guitar
- Jon Greville – drums
