= Coded Smears and More Uncommon Slurs =

Compilation album by Napalm Death
- Released: 30 March 2018
- Recorded: 2003–2016
- Genre: Grindcore; death metal
- Length: 92:23
- Label: Century Media

Napalm Death chronology
Apex Predator – Easy Meat (2015)	Coded Smears and More Uncommon Slurs (2018)	Throes of Joy in the Jaws of Defeatism (2020)

Coded Smears and More Uncommon Slurs is a compilation album by British grindcore band Napalm Death, released on 30 March 2018 through Century Media. It contains previously unreleased material from various album recording sessions, b-sides, limited edition bonus tracks and split recordings. A music video for "Standardization", the compilation's opening track, was released on 8 May 2018.

== Critical reception ==
Professional ratings
Review scores
Source	Rating
Metal Hammer	8/10
Blabbermouth.net	9/10

Coded Smears and More Uncommon Slurs was well received by critics. Dean Brown of Metal Hammer considered the album "certainly a very useful stopgap release for fans of the legendary band who have missed out on all of the extra gems included on various release formats during this period", stressing the high quality of the songwriting and the order of the songs: "By eschewing the chronological approach, this compilation has been carefully arranged to flow naturally like a studio album.". Jay H. Gorania, rating the album 9 out of 10 for Blabbermouth.net, shared this view: "It truly feels like a new album worth digesting like any other new Napalm effort." He concluded that the album "isn't anything new. But it does represent everything that is right with intense music in terms of sound and spirit. The masters deliver yet again."

== Track listing ==
Disc 1
No.	Title	Lyrics	Music	Origin	Length
1.	"Standardization"	Greenway	Embury	Utilitarian album sessions	2:46
2.	"Oh So Pseudo"	Greenway	Harris	Apex Predator – Easy Meat album sessions	2:36
3.	"It Failed to Explode"	Greenway	Embury	Utilitarian album sessions	3:38
4.	"Losers"	Greenway	Harris	The Code Is Red...Long Live the Code album sessions	4:21
5.	"Call That an Option?"	Greenway	Embury	Smear Campaign album sessions	3:03
6.	"Caste as Waste"	Greenway	Embury	Apex Predator – Easy Meat album sessions	3:06
7.	"We Hunt in Packs"	Greenway	Harris	Time Waits for No Slave album sessions	3:49
8.	"Oxygen of Duplicity"	Greenway	Harris	Melvins Sugar Daddy Live split series Vol. 9	3:30
9.	"Paracide" (Gepøpel cover)	Gepøpel	Gepøpel	Apex Predator – Easy Meat album sessions	1:39
10.	"Critical Gluttonous Mass"	Greenway	Harris	Apex Predator – Easy Meat album sessions	2:26
11.	"Aim Without an Aim"	Greenway	Harris	Utilitarian album sessions	3:04
12.	"An Extract (Strip it Clean)"	Greenway	Embury	The Mission Creep split EP with Heaven Shall Burn	3:12
13.	"Phonetics for the Stupefied"	Greenway	Harris	Forever Mountain / Phonetics for the Stupefied split EP with Voivod	3:29
14.	"Suppressed Hunger"	Greenway	Embury	Time Waits for No Slave album sessions	3:09
15.	"To Go Off and Things" (Cardiacs cover)	Mark Cawthra, Tim Smith	Cawthra, Smith	Melvins Sugar Daddy Live split series Vol. 9	2:29
Total length:					46:17

Disc 2
No.	Title	Lyrics	Music	Origin	Length
1.	"Clouds of Cancer / Victims of Ignorance" (G-Anx cover)	G-Anx	G-Anx	Apex Predator – Easy Meat album sessions	2:05
2.	"What Is Past Is Prologue"	Embury	Embury	Apex Predator – Easy Meat album sessions	2:56
3.	"Like Piss to a Sting"	Greenway	Embury	Napalm Death / Melt Banana split EP	1:31
4.	"Where the Barren Is Fertile"	Greenway	Embury	Napalm Death / Melt Banana split EP	2:22
5.	"Crash the Pose"	Gauze	Gauze	The Code Is Red...Long Live the Code album sessions	1:32
6.	"Earthwire"	Harris	Harris	April 2015 Nepal earthquake DZI foundation benefit track	2:54
7.	"Will by Mouth"	Greenway	Embury	Converge / Napalm Death split EP	1:25
8.	"Everything in Mono"	Greenway	Harris	Utilitarian album sessions	2:48
9.	"Omnipresent Knife in Your Back"	Greenway	Embury	Time Waits for No Slave album sessions	5:15
10.	"Lifeline" (Sacrilege cover)	Lynda Hughes	Damien Thompson	Respect Your Roots Worldwide compilation	3:18
11.	"Youth Offender"	Greenway	Embury	B-side of the Analysis Paralysis single off the Utilitarian album	2:07
12.	"No Impediment to Triumph (Bhopal)"	Greenway	Embury	Converge / Napalm Death split EP	3:02
13.	"Legacy Was Yesterday"	Embury, Greenway	Embury	Decibel flexi series No. 5	2:15
14.	"Outconditioned" (Despair cover)	Waldemar Sorychta	Sorychta	Covering 20 Years of Extremes compilation	2:25
15.	"Atheist Runt"	Greenway	Embury	Smear Campaign album sessions	6:07
16.	"Weltschmerz (Extended Apocalyptic Version)"		Harris	Smear Campaign album sessions	4:04
Total length:					46:06

== Personnel ==
=== Napalm Death ===
- Barney Greenway – vocals
- Mitch Harris – guitars
- Shane Embury – bass
- Danny Herrera – drums

=== Technical personnel ===
- Frode Sylthe – album art, layout
