= Icons of Filth =

Welsh anarcho-punk band

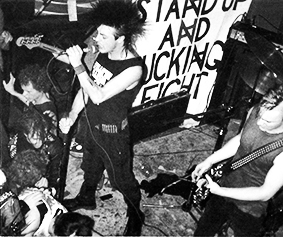
- Icons of filth live in the 1980s

Background information
- Origin: Cardiff, Glamorgan, Wales
- Genre: Anarcho-punk
- Years active: 1979–present
- Label: Mortarhate
- Members: Daffy Marshall; Fish; Papa; Dan
- Website: https://www.IconsofFilth.com

Icons of Filth are a Welsh anarcho-punk band that were formed in 1979. The issues the band promoted through their lyrics included animal rights, anarchism, environmentalism, anti-war, vegetarianism, veganism, antiglobalisation, feminism, and the negative effects of organised religion. Live shows were often used to raise money for these causes and also others including Rock Against Racism and the UK miners' strike (1984–85).

== Early history ==
Icons of Filth started life as Mock Death in Cardiff in 1979, with Aitch (Mark Wilson) on drums, Daffy on guitar, Socket (Tony Watts) on bass and Fran and Tina sharing vocal duties. After a year of local performances, the band dissolved.

Atomic Filth formed shortly afterwards with Socket, Daffy and Aitch from Mock Death and Stig (Andrew Sewell) on vocals. Within a year the name had been changed to Icons of Filth and Socket had left, to be replaced on bass by Ed. They recorded the cassette LP Not On Her Majesty's Service in September 1982, becoming the first release on Conflict's Mortarhate label (Mortarhate M1). This was followed up by the May 1983 recording Used · Abused · Unamused which was released as a 7-inch EP on Corpus Christi Records. Ed left after its release and was replaced by Fish on bass. In December 1983, Onward Christian Soldiers was recorded, and was released the following March on Mortarhate records. This LP featured a strong animal rights theme. After a series of performances in 1984, usually with Conflict, the Brain Death 7-inch EP was recorded in October 1984. This was followed in April 1985 by the Filth & the Fury EP.

== Death of Stig ==
While playing at a squat gig in Hackney, London on 23 October 2004, Stig complained of feeling unwell. He died abruptly of a heart attack shortly afterwards. The band played two benefit gigs for Stig's children in London and Los Angeles, after which they decided to disband indefinitely. They reformed for two performances in Cardiff to commemorate the ten year commemoration of Stig's death, and played alongside both of Stig's son's bands.

After a concert arranged to mark the anniversary of Stig's passing in 2014, the band members decided to reform. After several lineup changes they eventually settled and released a 10-inch EP 'Plight' on Grow Your Own Records in July 2021.

== Legacy ==
In an interview with The Guardian in 2016, the band was citied along with a number of other British Anarcho-punk bands of the early 80s as being an influence to the American avant-garde metal group Neurosis.

== Discography ==
=== Albums ===
- Not On Her Majesty's Service (1982), Mortarhate
- Onward Christian Soldiers (1984), Mortarhate - UK Indie No. 2
- Nostradamnedus (2002), Go-Kart

Compilations

- The Mortarhate Projects (1995), Mortarhate

=== EPs ===
- Used, Abused, Unamused (1983), Corpus Christi - UK Indie No. 20
- Brain Death (1984), Mortarhate - UK Indie No. 3
- The Filth and the Fury (1985), Mortarhate - UK Indie No. 9
- Show Us You Care (1999), BBP
- Plight (2021), Grow Your Own
