= The Ungovernable Force =

Studio album by Conflict
- Released: August 1986
- Recorded: August 1985
- Studio: Rockfield Studios, Wales
- Genre: Anarcho-punk
- Length: 32:17
- Label: Mortarhate

Conflict chronology
| Increase the Pressure (1984) | The Ungovernable Force (1986) | The Final Conflict (1988) |

Professional ratings
Review scores
| Source | Rating |
|---|---|
| Allmusic | 4.5/5 stars |
| Select | 3/5 stars |

The Ungovernable Force is an album by the British punk rock band Conflict. It was released in 1986 by Mortarhate Records and reached number 2 in the UK Independent album charts.

Considered by many in the punk rock community to be the band's most coherent and complete representation of their politics and aesthetic, it has become an enduring classic in anarchist punk music culture. A review for Louder Than War in 2021 described The Ungovernable Force as "still one of the best punk rock albums of all time".

== Track listing ==
1. "You Cannot Win" – 3:17
2. "The Ungovernable Farce" – 1:27
3. "A Piss In The Ocean" – 2:03
4. "C.R.A.S.S." – 1:25
5. "Custom Rock" – 1:51
6. "1986, The Battle Continues" – 0:59
7. "Mental Mania" – 2:00
8. "The Ungovernable Force" – 3:21
9. "They Said That..." – 2:15
10. "Force or Service" – 2:09
11. "The Arrest" – 1:16
12. "Statement" – 2:10
13. "The Day Before" – 2:10
14. "This Is The A.L.F." – 2:47
15. "To Be Continued..." – 3:03
16. "Mighty And Superior" – 3:49
17. "To Whom It May Concern" – 3:16
18. "This Is The A.L.F. [Remix]" – 2:48
19. "This Is The A.L.F. [Remix]" – 2:47
20. "Custom Rock" – 1:49
21. "Statement" – 2:10
22. "Hidden Track" – 1:56

== Personnel ==
- Colin - vocals
- Paco - drums
- Kevin - guitar
- Paul - bass guitar
- Steve - vocals
- Mandy - vocals
