= Conflict (band) =

English punk band

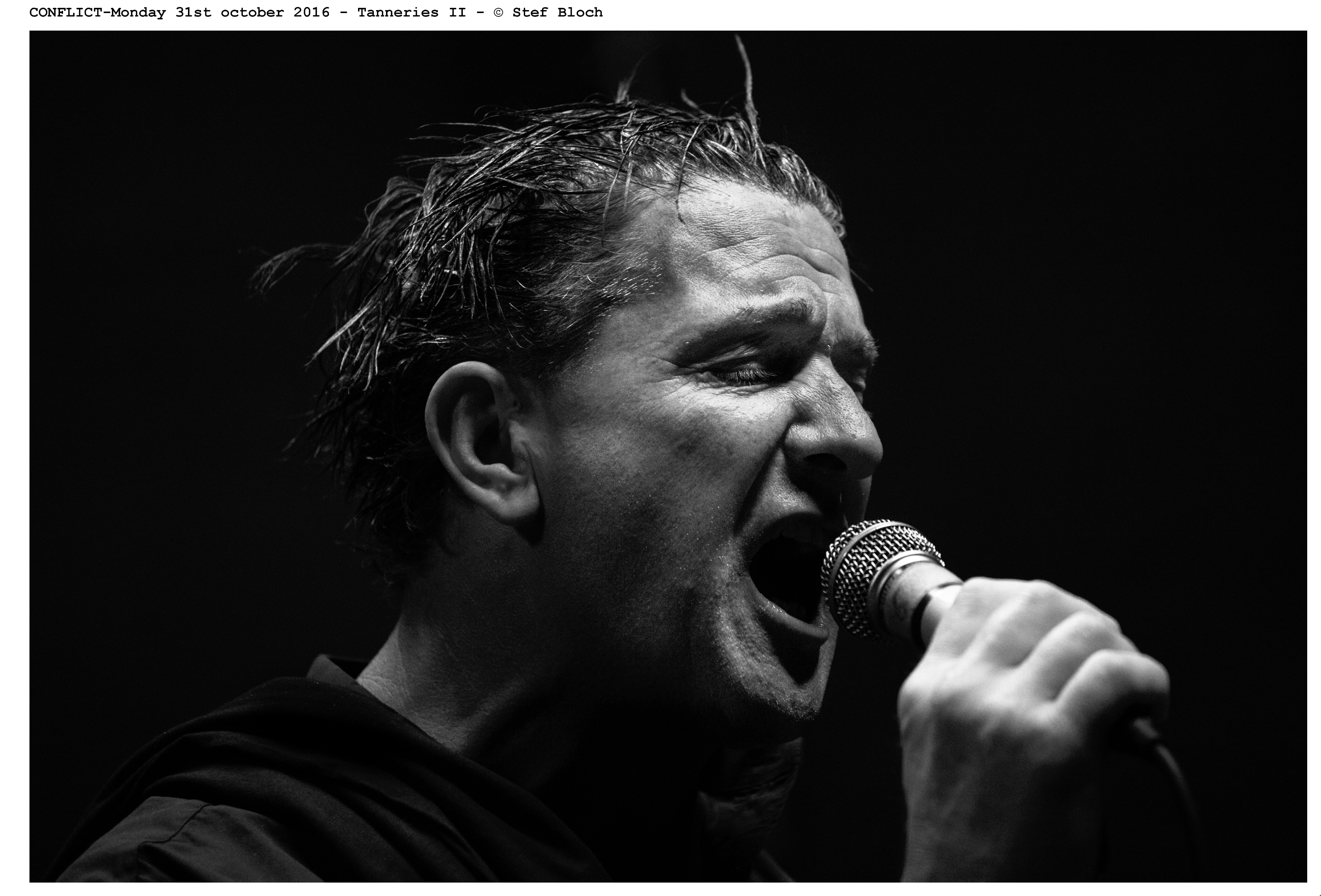
- Jerwood performing in 2016 - photo by Stef Bloch

Background information
- Origin: Eltham, London, England
- Genres: Anarcho-punk; hardcore punk
- Years active: 1981–present
- Labels: Crass; Corpus Christi; Mortarhate; Go-Kart

Conflict are an English anarcho-punk band originally based in Eltham in South London.

== History ==
Formed in 1981, the band's original line up consisted of: Colin Jerwood (vocals), Francisco 'Paco' Carreno (drums), John (bass guitar), Steve (guitars), Pauline (vocals), and Paul a.k.a. 'Nihilistic Nobody' (visuals). Their first release was the 1982 EP "The House That Man Built" on Crass Records. By the time they released their first album, 1983s It's Time to See Who's Who, on Corpus Christi Records, Pauline and Paul had left the band.

In 1983, Conflict set up their own Mortarhate Records label, which put out their own records as well as releases by other artists including Hagar the Womb, Icons of Filth, Lost Cherrees, The Apostles, and Stalag 17. A sub-label Fightback Records, was active from 1984-1986., both manufactured and administered by Jungle Records.

Also in 1983, Steve Ignorant, who was at the time a member of the band Crass, guested on the band's pro-animal rights single "To A Nation of Animal Lovers". After the dissolution of Crass, Ignorant later became second vocalist for Conflict on a semi-permanent basis until the mid 1990s.

The band's "Mighty and Superior" was voted number 53 best song of the year by the John Peel Festive Fifty radio show audience in 1985, a year that show played a top 70.

Conflict has always been outspoken regarding issues such as anarchism, animal rights, the anti-war movement and in their support for the organisation Class War. A number of their gigs during the 1980s were followed by riots and disturbances. On 18 April 1987, Conflict appeared at the Brixton Academy in London as part of a benefit event titled "The Gathering of the 5000" which intended to raise money for causes including the Animal Liberation Front, London Greenpeace, Hunt Saboteurs Association, Class War, Housmans Bookshop and Anti-Fascist Action. According to the band, fans leaving the event were attacked by the police, which led to a riot culminating in 52 arrests and several police officers being injured.

In a 2016 primer on anarcho punk for The Wire, the band were described as:

"Rejecting hippy anarchism for direct action, particularly on the topics of animal rights and corporate globalisation, Conflict came to replace Crass as anarcho-punk's ethical template."

Former band drummer, Francisco "Paco" Carreno, died on 20 February 2015, at the age of 49. In August 2019, long-term bassist, Hoddy, decided to step down from bass duties after over 30 years. Later that year Fran Fearon was recruited on bass as well as an additional vocalist, Fiona Friel, aka Fi, longtime frontwoman of Dragster.

The line-up of Jerwood, Gav, Stu, Fearon and Fi toured from 2021. A live album, Live in Dublin, was released in 2024 and the first new studio material for over 20 years, a 7" single entitled "This is Conflict", was released in November 2024. The band's latest studio album, This Much Remains, was released in May 2025.

On 2 June 2025, it was announced by his family that Colin Jerwood had died at the age of 63, following a short illness. The band released a statement saying:

"As you can imagine we are struggling to find the words to describe how sad and upset we feel upon hearing of the loss of our band member and dear friend Colin. We extend our deepest condolences to James, Georgia and the rest of Colin’s family and friends. We ask that you respect their wishes and understand that we are all currently grieving a great loss. Thank you. Gav, Fi, Fran and Matt."

The band continued to perform scheduled gigs throughout 2025 in tribute to Jerwood and with the blessing of his family.

== Members ==
=== Original line up ===
- Colin Jerwood (vocals) died on May 31, 2025
- John Clifford (bass guitar)
- Kenny Barnes (drums)
- Graham Ball (guitar)
- Paul Fryday, a.k.a. 'Nihilistic Nobody' (visuals)

=== Past members ===
- Francisco "Paco" Carreno (drums) died 2015
- Steve Gittins (guitar)
- Mandy Spokes (vocals)
- Kevin Webb (guitar)
- Paul Hoddy (bass guitar)
- Chris Parish (guitar)
- Kerry B (vocals)
- Steve Ignorant (vocals)
- Ferenc Collins (guitar)
- Marshall Penn (guitar)
- Nathan Perrier (drums)
- Derek Reid (bass)
- Mark Pickstone (keyboards)
- Jackie Hanna (vocals)
- Sarah Taylor (vocals)
- Eve Scragg (vocals)
- Matthew Zilch (guitar)
- Gav King (guitar)
- Jeannie Ford (vocals)
- Stuart Meadows (drums)
- Fiona Jayne Friel (vocals)
- Fran Fearon (bass)
- Colin Jerwood (vocals) died 2025

=== Current members ===
- Gav King (guitar)
- Fiona Jayne Friel (vocals)
- Fran Fearon (bass)
- Matt Howlett (drums)

== Discography ==
Chart placings shown are from the UK Indie Chart.

=== Studio albums ===
- It's Time to See Who's Who LP (March 1983, Corpus Christi Records) (number 1)
  - reissued in May 1994 as It's Time to See Who's Who Now by Mortarhate Records, with a different track listing.
- Increase the Pressure LP / CD (June 1984, Mortarhate Records) (number 2)
- The Ungovernable Force LP (August 1986, Mortarhate Records) (number 2)
  - reissued in 2006 with bonus tracks on CD by Mortarhate Records.
- From Protest To Resistance LP (1986, Bust Fund) (number 11)
- The Final Conflict LP (December 1988, Mortarhate Records) (number 13)
- Against All Odds LP (1989, Mortarhate Records)
- Conclusion LP / CD (December 1993, Mortarhate Records)
- There's No Power Without Control LP / CD (July 2003, Mortarhate Records)
- This Much Remains CD / LP / Boxset (May 2025, Cadiz Music/Motorhate Records)

=== EPs ===
- "The House That Man Built" EP (June 1982, Crass Records) (number 3). Later re-issued on Mortarhate Records.
- "To a Nation of Animal Lovers" EP (October 1983, Corpus Christi Records) (number 4). Later re-issued on Mortarhate Records.
- "The Serenade is Dead" EP (January 1984, Mortarhate Records) (number 5)
- "This is Not Enough, Stand Up and Fucking Fight" 7" (March 1985, Mortarhate Records) (number 3)
- "The Battle Continues" 7" (October 1985, Mortarhate Records) (number 1)
- "The Final Conflict" 12"(1988, Mortarhate Records)
- "These Colours Don't Run" 7" / CD (October 1993, Mortarhate Records)
- "BBC1" 7" (1995, Mortarhate Records)
- "Now You've Put Your Foot in It" 7" / CD (2001, Mortarhate Records)
- "Carlo Giuliani" 7" / CD (April 2003, Mortarhate Records)
- "THIS IS CONFLICT" 7" (November 2024)
- "Collusion Exclusion" 10" (November 2025, Motarhate Records/Cadiz Music)
- "The House That Man Built" EP 12" with extra tracks (07 August 2026, Motarhate Records/Cadiz Music)
- "To A Nation Of Animal Lovers" EP 12" with extra tracks (07 August 2026, Motarhate Records/Cadiz Music)

=== Compilations ===
- Who? What? Why? When? Where? LP / CD (1984, Mortarhate Records). The album had little circulation on its initial release, but gained greater currency when re-released in 2003.
- Employing All Means Necessary LP / CD (1985, Mortarhate Records)
- Standard Issue 82–87 LP / CD (February 1989, Mortarhate Records)
- Standard Issue II 88–94 LP / CD (1996, Mortarhate Records)
- Deploying All Means Necessary (February 1997)
- There Must Be Another Way (January 2001)

=== Live ===
- Live at Centro Iberico EP (October 1982, Xntrix Records) (number 7). Later re-issued on Mortarhate Records.
- Live at Brest, France (March 1983)
- Only Stupid Bastards Help EMI LP (1986, New Army Records) (number 5)
- Leeds University (April 1986)
- Turning Rebellion into Money Double LP / CD (1987, Mortarhate Records) (number 1)
- In The Venue (April 2000)
- In America CD (2001, Go-Kart Records 83)
- Live in London (2004)
- Live in Dublin Double 10"/CD (2025, Motorhate Records/Cadiz Music)
- To Live On In Hearts - Live In Holland LP/CD (2026, Motarhate Records/Cadiz Music)

=== Other ===
- Rebellion Sucks! (Anthology and DVD of Live in London 2004)

== See also ==
- Animal rights and punk subculture
