= It's Time to See Who's Who =

Studio album by Conflict
- Released: March 1983
- Recorded: July–November 1982, Southern Studios, London
- Genre: Anarcho-punk
- Length: 34:19
- Label: Corpus Christi
- Producer: Watt Right

Conflict chronology
It's Time to See Who's Who (1983)	Increase the Pressure (1984)

Professional ratings
Review scores
Source	Rating
Allmusic	4.5/5 stars

It’s Time to See Who’s Who is the debut album from the British punk rock band Conflict. It was released in 1983 by Corpus Christi Records, and rerecorded and released in 1994 as It's Time to See Who's Who Now on the band's own label Mortarhate Records, with a different track listing.

The song Exploitation is an insult to the punk band The Exploited for their appearance on Top of the Pops, which led to a long-running rivalry with the band.

== Track listing ==
1. "Young Parasites" – 2:13
2. "Kings & Punks" – 1:08
3. "Meat Means Murder" – 2:02
4. "No Island Of Dreams" – 2:45
5. "Great What?" – 1:57
6. "The Guilt & The Glory" – 3:31
7. "1824 Overture" – 1:15
8. "Bullshit Broadcast" – 1:51
9. "One Nation Under The Bomb" – 1:36
10. "Blind Attack (Part 2)" – 1:38
11. "Vietnam Serenade" – 1:12
12. "Blood Morons" – 1:48
13. "Exploitation" – 2:09
14. "Crazy Governments" – 5:17

== Personnel ==
- Colin · vocals
- John · bass guitar
- Paco · drums
- Steve · guitar
- Paul · visuals, tapes
- Gemma & Mandy · additional vocals
