= Apex Predator – Easy Meat =

Studio album by Napalm Death
- Released: 23 January 2015
- Recorded: 2014
- Studio: Parlour Studios, Kettering; Studio Hostivar, Prague; Griffin Studios, Las Vegas
- Genre: Deathgrind
- Length: 39:57
- Label: Century Media
- Producer: Russ Russell

Napalm Death chronology
Utilitarian (2012)	Apex Predator – Easy Meat (2015)	Coded Smears and More Uncommon Slurs (2018)

Apex Predator – Easy Meat is the fifteenth studio album by British grindcore band Napalm Death, released on 23 January 2015 through Century Media. Since the band recorded the album in segments, recording took almost a year. In advance of the release, Napalm Death issued details of the then upcoming album such as artwork and track listing as well as two new songs. The first video clip taken from Apex Predator coincided with the release. Reviews of Apex Predator were overwhelmingly positive, while it also entered a number of American and European charts.

Rolling Stone put the album on the list of the best 20 metal albums of 2015.

== Style, writing, composition ==
In Terrorizer, vocalist Greenway cited Swans, My Bloody Valentine, Big Black, The Young Gods and SLAB! as sources of influence on Napalm Death. For the vocals in the intro of the album Greenway drew inspiration from Michael Gira as well as from Johnny Rotten. Referring to the latter, Greenway pointed out "the way he used to spit his words out, enunciate them in different ways. I've never done that before, and when I listened back to it I thought it sounded pretty vicious." Both Greenway and bassist Shane Embury emphasised the spontaneity as the principle for writing music, as Embury explained: "I wanted to bring that to Napalm on this album in particular." With all the influences, "for this album, we just wanted to make it varied and intense", he added.

Lyrically, "the main thrust of the album was inspired by the building collapse in Bangladesh, the Rana Plaza in April 2013," said vocalist Greenway. He considered it "a major event in terms of human tragedy" with less media coverage and public awareness than it should have had. He concluded, "that's what truly highlights the point I want to make, which is that life seems to be viewed as cheaper in some points of the world, especially where it's treated as a kind of dumping ground for everybody else who is much more fortunate and who consumes."

== Release and promotion ==
In October 2014, Napalm Death made a press release about the ongoing work on the upcoming album, revealing details of the recording status and some song titles. In the press release vocalist Mark Greenway mitigated concerns about the duration of the album recordings: "The full story is though that we've been recording it in segments to try and achieve varying types of sonic assault." The track "Cesspits" was the first song of Apex Predator – Easy Meat to be presented to the public in advance. It debuted with British music magazine Terrorizer in November 2014. Shortly after, in December, Napalm Death revealed the track listing and artwork, along with comments on the artwork from bassist Shane Embury and Greenway. In January 2015, the band launched the song "How the Years Condemn" online via music magazines Stereogum and Metal Hammer.

Century Media released the album between 23 and 30 January 2015 in different countries on CD, vinyl and MC in different variations and with various extras such as bonus tracks, posters and extended booklets depending on the format. A video clip for the song "Smash a Single Digit" accompanied the release. It was directed by Michael Panduro and is composed of 1093 single drawings. Singer Greenway commented on the capitalism-criticising theme of the video, "It shows nothing of dignity or life's fundamental pleasures — only a snapshot of those unfortunate enough to only be deemed as numbers for production quotas in this world. When a 'digit' has therefore been expended, it is rubbed out (or consumed leaving no trace, as in the case of this video)."

== Critical reception ==
Professional ratings
Aggregate scores
Source	Rating
AnyDecentMusic?	8.0/10
Metacritic	89/100
Review scores
Source	Rating
AllMusic	4.5/5 stars
Clash	4/5
Exclaim!	9/10
The Guardian	5/5 stars
Kerrang!	5/5 stars
MetalSucks	4/5 stars
New Noise	4/5 stars
Pitchfork	7.9/10
Revolver	4.5/5 stars
SF Media	5/5 stars

Upon its release, Apex Predator – Easy Meat received rave reviews from music critics. At Metacritic, which assigns a normalized rating out of 100 to reviews from critics, the album received an average score of 89, which indicates "universal acclaim", based on 15 reviews. Thom Jurek of AllMusic wrote that "Apex Predator – Easy Meat ups the ante on all their post-2000 albums," describing the album as "completely unrelenting; thoroughly amazing." Clash critic Geoff Cowart described the album as "both intensely lyrical and supremely musical" commenting that "it plays out in a way that is designed to be perversely uncomfortable for the ears." Writing for Exclaim!, Denise Falzon observed that the band's "traditional characteristics and intellectual concepts, incorporated with new elements and ideas, make Apex Predator - Easy Meat another impressive addition to Napalm Death's spotless catalogue." The Quietus critic Dean Brown thought that "Apex Predator - Easy Meat's hyperactive energy and deadly pacing of its recent predecessors" gives their fans "a diverse and devastating listening experience during what is a quintessential, zeitgeist-destroying grindcore album."

Guy Pratt of Revolver stated that "experimentation rife on the record proves that sometimes variety makes grind even better." MetalSucks critic Sammy O'Hagar wrote: "Apex Predator – Easy Meat isn’t the easiest of theirs to like, but it’s still Napalm Death right down to its bones."

== Track listing ==
All lyrics are written by Barney Greenway, except where noted; all music is composed by Shane Embury, except where noted.

No.	Title	Lyrics	Music	Length
1.	"Apex Predator – Easy Meat"			3:46
2.	"Smash a Single Digit"			1:25
3.	"Metaphorically Screw You"		Mitch Harris	2:05
4.	"How the Years Condemn"	Embury		2:43
5.	"Stubborn Stains"			3:02
6.	"Timeless Flogging"		Harris	2:26
7.	"Dear Slum Landlord..."		Harris	1:59
8.	"Cesspits"			3:33
9.	"Bloodless Coup"		Harris	2:31
10.	"Beyond the Pale"	Harris	Harris	3:03
11.	"Stunt Your Growth"		Harris	2:06
12.	"Hierarchies"	Embury		3:13
13.	"One-Eyed"			2:48
14.	"Adversarial / Copulating Snakes"			5:17
Total length:				39:57

Japanese edition bonus tracks
No.	Title	Lyrics	Music	Length
13.	"Caste the Waste"	Embury		3:07
14.	"One-Eyed"			2:49
15.	"What Is Past Is Prologue"		Harris	2:56
16.	"Oh So Pseudo"	Embury		2:37
17.	"Adversarial / Copulating Snakes"			5:17
18.	"Paracide" (Gepøpel Cover)			1:42

LP and MC bonus track, North American digipak CD bonus track & mediabook CD bonus track
No.	Title	Length
13.	"One-Eyed"	2:49

Mediabook CD bonus tracks
No.	Title	Lyrics	Music	Length
14.	"What Is Past Is Prologue"	Embury		1:38
15.	"Oh So Pseudo"		Harris	1:42
16.	"Adversarial / Copulating Snakes"			5:17
17.	"Clouds of Cancer / Victims of Ignorance" (G-ANX cover)			2:06

LP and MC bonus track & North American digipak CD bonus track
No.	Title	Length
14.	"Adversarial / Copulating Snakes"	5:17

LP and MC bonus track
No.	Title	Music	Length
15.	"Critical Gluttonous Mass"	Harris	2:31

North American digipak CD bonus track
No.	Title	Music	Length
15.	"Oh So Pseudo"	Harris	1:42

== Personnel ==
Napalm Death

- Barney Greenway – vocals
- Shane Embury – bass, vocals
- Mitch Harris – guitars, vocals
- Danny Herrera – drums

Additional musicians

- John Bilbo Cooke – token guitar solo (12)

Technical personnel

- Russ Russell – engineering, recording, production, mixing, mastering
- David Pavlik – Mitch Harris vocals engineering
- Frode Sundbø Sylthe – album art, layout
- Ignacio Galvez – band photos

== Chart positions ==
Chart (2015)	Peak position
Belgian Albums (Ultratop Flanders)	103
Belgian Albums (Ultratop Wallonia)	111
French Albums (SNEP)	99
German Albums (Offizielle Top 100)	36
Swiss Albums (Schweizer Hitparade)	64
UK Top Rock Albums	15
US Top Hard Rock Albums (Billboard)	10
US Heatseekers Albums (Billboard)	2
US Independent Albums (Billboard)	25
US Top Rock Albums (Billboard)	28
US Indie Store Album Sales (Billboard)	12
