= Mark Samuels (author) =

British writer of supernatural and horror fiction

Mark Samuels (1967–2023) was a British author of horror and fantastic fiction in the tradition of Arthur Machen and H. P. Lovecraft. His fiction was first published in 1988, and many of his early short stories are set in a shadowy modern London in which the protagonists gradually discover a dark and terrifying reality behind the mundane urban world. Thomas Ligotti wrote of Samuels's first short story collection, The White Hands (2003), that it is "a treasure and a genuine contribution to the real history of weird fiction".

The White Hands was shortlisted for the British Fantasy Award in the Best Collection category in 2004. The title story of The White Hands was also on their shortlist for the Best Short Story category. A paperback reprint was reviewed in The Guardian newspaper. In 2011, he wrote The Man Who Collected Machen and Other Weird Tales. The Age of Decayed Futurity: The Best of Mark Samuels received a starred review from Publishers Weekly in 2020.

The short fiction collection Marked to Die: A Tribute to Mark Samuels (2016) was edited by Justin Isis and dedicated to Samuels.

Samuels died in 2023.
