= Rudimentary Peni =

British punk band

- Origin: London, England
- Genres: Anarcho-punk, hardcore punk, art punk, deathrock
- Years active: 1980–present
- Labels: Outer Himalayan, Crass, Corpus Christi, Southern
- Members: Nick Blinko; Grant Matthews; Jon Greville

Rudimentary Peni are a British anarcho-punk band formed in 1980, emerging from the London anarcho-punk scene. Lead singer/guitarist Nick Blinko is notorious for his witty, macabre lyrics and dark pen-and-ink artwork, prominently featured on all of Rudimentary Peni's albums. Bassist Grant Matthews has also written several songs for the band, though his lyrics primarily focus on sociopolitical themes.

== History ==
Rudimentary Peni were formed in June 1980 in Abbots Langley, Hertfordshire, by Blinko (vocals, guitar), Greville (drums) and Matthews (bass).

Blinko and Greville had met years prior in Langleybury Comprehensive secondary school. Greville had been playing drums since he was young, beginning lessons at the age of 10, and slowly became interested in punk rock around the time the first Sex Pistols album was released. After meeting Blinko through a mutual friend, the pair began the experimental electronic duo the Magits, formed in 1977 and dissolved around 1980. The Magits released their first and only EP, Fully Coherent, in 1979 as the first record on Blinko's newly formed Outer Himalayan Records. In his 2006 book The Day the Country Died: A History of Anarcho Punk 1980–1984, punk historian Ian Glasper referred to the sound of the Magits' EP as a "meandering collection of keyboard torture".

Blinko, Greville, and Matthews subsequently formed Rudimentary Peni. In Maximum RocknRoll issue No. 237 (February 2003), Matthews explained how he came up with the name of the band: "When I was at school studying biology, we were told that in the fetal stage the clitoris is a rudimentary penis". By 1981, the band had played their first show, along with the S-Haters, and Soft Drinks in Watford, Hertfortshire. Greville later characterized the first show, as well as the ones following it, as fairly disappointing, setting a precedent for the band's distaste for playing live. While they were inspired by punk rock, the band did not adopt the look of the day, as Greville noted: "The majority of people [were] clearly disappointed that we didn't have green mohicans and multiple piercings ... if you were the sort of person to be put off by what we looked like, you were never going to understand or appreciate the songs anyway".

They recorded their first EP, an eponymous 12-song 7-inch, in 1981 at Street Level Studios in London and released it on Outer Himalayan. It was fast, loud, and often described as "demented" due to the sound, as well as Blinko's lyrics and artwork, which adorned the cover and inner sleeves. After the release of the EP, the band played their first London show on 18 September 1981 along with anarcho-punk bands Flux of Pink Indians and the Subhumans.

Early on, Rudimentary Peni had connections with fellow anarcho-punks Crass, and their second 7-inch EP, Farce, was issued by Crass Records. Up through the band's first studio album, Death Church (1983), their records were packaged in fold-out paper sleeves full of artwork, lyrics and poster graphics characteristic of Crass and many other bands in the anarcho-punk scene.

In 1987, the band's first two EPs were collected by Corpus Christi Records as The EPs of RP.

Rudimentary Peni stopped performing in the mid-1980s after bassist Matthews was diagnosed with cancer. After a four-year hiatus, they recorded Cacophony (1988), a sonic tribute to seminal New England horror author H. P. Lovecraft. Mark Ferelli, a fellow musician, introduced Blinko to Lovecraft; the pair also pushed each other's pen-and-ink artwork forward via friendly competition.

The band continued to record and release material into the 21st century, including the album Pope Adrian 37th Psychristiatric (1995) and the EPs Echoes of Anguish (1998), The Underclass (2000), Archaic (2004) and No More Pain (2008), and have maintained a diverse cult following in the United States punk scene. Most reissues of their 1980s albums are now out of print.

Blinko authored a semi-autobiographical novel called The Primal Screamer, published in 1995 by Spare Change Books (his bandmates and Ferelli appear under false names), as well as the more recent The Haunted Head (2009, Coptic Cat) and Visions of Pope Adrian 37th (2011, Coptic Cat). Blinko has also become increasingly popular in the outsider art scene.

== Musical style and influence ==
In an interview with The Guardian in 2016, the band was citied along with a number of other British anarcho-punk bands of the early 80s as being an influence to the American avant-garde metal group Neurosis.

A 2018 article in the US magazine Revolver stated that the band merges "eighties anarcho-punk into seething death rock via the nightmarish poetry of certifiably schizoid frontman Nick Blinko".

== Members ==
- Nick Blinko – guitar, vocals, artwork, lyrics
- Grant Matthews – bass, lyrics
- Jon Greville – drums

== Discography ==
Chart placings shown are from the UK Indie Chart.

=== Studio albums ===
- Death Church LP (Corpus Christi Records, 1983) (No. 3)
- Cacophony LP (Outer Himalayan, 1988) (No. 7)
- Pope Adrian 37th Psychristiatric CD (Outer Himalayan, 1995)
- Great War (2021, Sealed Records)

=== EPs ===
- Rudimentary Peni 7-inch EP (1981, Outer Himalayan)
- Farce 7-inch EP (1982, Crass Records) (#7)
- Echoes of Anguish 12-inch EP/CD EP (1998, Outer Himalayan)
- The Underclass 7-inch EP/CD EP (2000, Outer Himalayan)
- Archaic 10-inch EP/CD EP (2004, Outer Himalayan)
- No More Pain 12-inch EP/CD EP (2008, Southern Records)

=== Singles ===
- Wilfred Owen the Chance CD (2009, Coptic Cat/Outer Himalayan)

=== Live albums ===
- Derby 1993 (2015, Sheffield Tape Archive)

=== Compilation albums ===
- The EPs of RP LP (1987, Corpus Christi Records)
