= Philip Fracassi =

American writer of horror, thriller, and science fiction

Philip Fracassi is an American writer of horror, thriller, and science fiction. He has written multiple novels, screenplays, and short stories. He has been nominated for the Bram Stoker Award and the British Fantasy Award. He is the author of the novels A Child Alone with Strangers, Gothic, Boys in the Valley, The Third Rule of Time Travel, and The Autumn Springs Retirement Home Massacre. He is also the author of the story collections Behold the Void, Beneath a Pale Sky, and No One is Safe!

His books have been translated into multiple languages, and his stories have been published in numerous magazines and anthologies, including Black Static, Best Horror of the Year, Nightmare Magazine, Interzone, and Southwest Review. He has several projects in development for film and tv, and studio A24 recently adapted his short story, “Altar”, into a feature film.

His 2021 collection of short stories, Beneath a Pale Sky, was nominated for the Bram Stoker Award for Best Fiction Collection. The short story "Death, My Old Friend", featured in this collection, was optioned in 2022 by Christopher Riggert for a feature film adaptation. His novel, Boys in the Valley, was nominated for the British Fantasy Award.

== Bibliography ==
=== Novels ===
- The Egotist (1999, Equator books and 2024, Zagava)
- A Child Alone With Strangers (2022, Skyhorse)
- Don't Let Them Get You Down (2022, Zagava)
- Gothic (2023, Cemetery Dance)
- Boys in the Valley (2023, Tor Nightfire)
- The Third Rule of Time Travel (2025, Orbit)
- The Autumn Springs Retirement Home Massacre (2025, Tor Nightfire)
- Sarafina (2026, CLASH Books)

=== Novellas, novelettes, and short stories ===
- Mother (2015)
- Altar (2016)
- Shiloh (2017)
- Sacculina (2017)
- "Ateuchus" (2018)
- Commodore (2021)
- "Death, My Old Friend" (2021)
- "The Guardian" (2021)

=== Short story anthologies and collections ===
- Behold the Void (2017)
- The Midnight Exhibit, Vol. 1 (2020)
- The Nightside Codex (2020, "As I Sit To Write This Story")
- Beneath a Pale Sky (2021)
- The Bad Book (2021, "Marmalade")
- Slice of Paradise: A Beach Vacation Horror Anthology (2022, "The Guardian")
- Revelations: Horror Writers for Climate Action (2022, "The Guardian")
- Hybrid: Misfits, Monsters and Other Phenomena (2022, "My Father's Ashes")
- No One is Safe (2023)

=== Other work ===
- Tomorrow's Gone (2021, poetry collection)
- The Boy with the Blue Rose Heart (2022, children's fiction)

=== Screenplays ===
- Santa Paws 2: The Santa Pups (2012)
- Girl Missing (2015)

== Awards and honors ==
Fracassi's work has been nominated for and received multiple awards and honors.

- Short Story Collection of the Year from This Is Horror (2017, won, Behold the Void)
- Charles Dexter Award from Strange Aeons Magazine (2018, won, Behold the Void)
- Ignotus Award for Best Foreign Story (2019, finalist, "The Horse Thief")
- Best Horror Story Collections of 2021 from Tor Nightfire (Beneath a Pale Sky)
- Best Collection of the Year from Rue Morgue Magazine (2021, won, Beneath a Pale Sky)
- Bram Stoker Award for Best Fiction Collection (2021, nominated for Beneath a Pale Sky)
