= Stephen Barber (writer) =

British academic

- Born: United Kingdom
- Writing career
- Language: English
- Genres: Nonfiction, fiction

Stephen Barber is a professor at Kingston University and a writer on urban culture, experiment in film and Japanese culture. Barber has been a professor at Kingston University since 2002, and is currently a research professor in the Visual and Material Culture Research Centre, Faculty of Art, Design & Architecture. He has previously worked at such institutions as the California Institute of the Arts, University of Tokyo, Berlin University of the Arts, and Sussex University. He has a PhD from the University of London, and has lived in Tokyo, Paris, Berlin, Los Angeles, Vienna and London. He has also collaborated with prominent digital artists, photographers and poets, such as Xavier Ribas and Jeremy Reed.

Barber has been writing since 1990 and has published twenty books (sixteen non-fiction books and four novels), many of them translated into other languages. He has published a number of books with defunct Creation Books. He is also a frequent contributor to journals, especially 3:AM Magazine, Vertigo and Mute. He has received many awards and prizes for his books, from bodies such as the Rockefeller Foundation (Bellagio Program), Ford Foundation, DAAD, Japan Foundation and Henkel Foundation, He is currently engaged in a research project on the scrapbooks of the moving-image pioneer Eadweard Muybridge, funded by a Leverhulme Trust fellowship.

== Bibliography ==
- Antonin Artaud: Blows and Bombs (1993)
- Fragments of the European City (1995)
- Weapons of Liberation (1996)
- Artaud: The Screaming Body (1999)
- Edmund White: The Burning World (1999)
- Caligula: Divine Carnage (2001)
- Extreme Europe (2001)
- Projected Cities (2002)
- Annihilation Zones: Far East Atrocities of the 20th Century (2002)
- Genet: Pages Torn from the Book of Jean Genet (2004)
- The Art of Destruction: the Films of the Vienna Action Group (2004)
- The Vanishing Map (2006)
- Hijikata: Revolt of the Body (2006)
- The Tokyo Trilogy (2008)
- Artaud: Terminal Curses: The Notebooks (2008)
- Cities of Oblivion (2009)
- Abandoned Images: Film and Film's End (2010)
- England's Darkness (2013)
- Berlin Bodies (2017)
- White Noise Ballrooms (2018)
