= Nick Blinko =

British musician and artist

- Born: Nicholas John Blinko; 4 September 1961 (age 64); Watford, England
- Genres: Punk rock; anarcho-punk
- Occupations: Musician, author, artist
- Instruments: Vocal, guitar
- Years active: 1977–present

Nicholas John Blinko (born 4 September 1961) is a British musician and artist, best known as the lead singer, lyricist, and guitar player for the anarcho-punk band Rudimentary Peni. He is also known for being an "outsider" artist, whose pen-and-ink drawings and paintings have been shown in galleries worldwide. Blinko also creates all the drawings used by the band for its artwork.

== Career ==
=== Music ===
Nicholas John George Blinko's first recorded musical project was the Magits, who formed in 1977 and were primarily electronic. This band's only record, the 1979 7-inch EP Fully Coherent, was the first release on Blinko's Outer Himalayan Records label, and received occasional airplay by John Peel on Radio 1.

His most well-known and longest running band, Rudimentary Peni, formed in 1980 and would go on to release three albums and six EPs spanning 1981–2009. A full-length collection of the first two EPs was also released in 1987.

Rudimentary Peni's concept album Pope Adrian 37th Psychristiatric was allegedly written while Blinko was being detained in a psychiatric hospital under Section 3 of the UK Mental Health Act 1983. The subject matter of the album was purported to be based on the delusions Blinko was experiencing at this time.

=== Writing ===
Blinko has written and illustrated five books. The first, The Primal Screamer, was a fictionalized semi-autobiographical novel with horror elements. It was published in 1995 by Spare Change Books and received a second printing in 1997 and a third in 2002. The book is written as a series of journal entries made by the therapist of "Nathaniel Snoxell" (who starts a band which is never named but is similar to Rudimentary Peni in many ways). This book was reprinted in 2011 by PM Press, and collected artwork used for several previous editions under one cover for the first time. The 2011 edition was distributed by the Alternative Tentacles label.

Blinko's second book, The Haunted Head, was published in 2009 by David Tibet via Coptic Cat, in a limited edition of approximately 350 copies. An exclusive micro-edition of 60 copies was also published, featuring an original piece of art, while all copies of the book contained a postcard with a handwritten excerpt from the book. The edition size reflected the number of Blinko's handwritten postcards, from which the text of the book was transcribed, and which were included in the book. The book also included a one-track CD of a song by Rudimentary Peni called "Wilfred Owen The Chances" Zagava Books re-issued The Haunted Head in three editions in 2024: a lettered edition of 24 examplars, a numbered edition of 224 copies and an unlimited paperback edition.

His third book was titled Visions of Pope Adrian 37th. It was published in 2011, again by Coptic Cat, in two extremely limited editions which both included a small piece of original art by Blinko, drawn directly onto a page of the book. The "standard edition" was limited to 370 copies, while the "special edition" was limited to 37. The book included 87 drawings, an introduction by outsider art specialist Colin Rhodes and a brief introduction by Blinko. The artwork in this book was reproduced in its original A5 size. Zagava Books also re-issued Vision of Pope Adrian 37th in three editions: a lettered edition which was remarqued and signed on the title page; a numbered edition of 222 copies, bound in pope-red velvet, came with a small signed drawing of a cat on a 10.5 by 10.5 cm paper, presented in a transparent envelope; and an unlimited A4 paperback edition.

The fourth book, Nick Blinko with an essay by Dr. Colin Rhodes, was published by Zagava Books in 2020 as A4-sized art book in three edition: a lettered edition in a large portfolio binding, signed and remarqued on title page (Blinko also added some stickers to this page); a numbered edition 275 copies with 12 fold-out-pages; and an unlimited A4-sized paperback.

Nick Blinko's fifth book were his sketchbooks, simply titled The Sketchbooks of Nick Blinko. Three sketchbooks in the original format of 11 by 15 cm bound in black leatherette, resembling the original Dale sketchbooks Blinko used, were issued as a three-book-set in an edition of 500 examplars by Zagava Books in 2021. A single sketchbook titled Keep out of Reach of Children was published in an unlimited edition.

Blinko also contributed to a collection of punk fiction short stories, Gobbing, Pogoing and Gratuitous Bad Language!: An Anthology of Punk Short Stories by Stewart Home (1996-04-06), published in 1996 by Spare Change Books. His story, "Punk Alice" (a reference to Rudimentary Peni's song "Alice Crucifies the Paedophiles"), is written in a sketchbook style of doodles and scribbled phrases referencing the death of punk, chess, Catholicism, depression, goth, Rudimentary Peni lyrics and drug chemicals.

=== Art ===
Blinko has contributed album artwork to several musical projects aside from his own. Among these are Part 1's 1985 release Pictures of Pain, released on Pushead's label Pusmort; Coil's 1997 release, Unnatural History III, released on Threshold House; Iron Lung's 2007 Prank Records release Sexless//No Sex; Omaniescum Aorisum's 2013 Solitude Records release Mademoiselle Hélène; and Fire in the Head's 2010 release Confessions of a Narcissist. He also contributed musically to two releases by Fire in the Head.

Blinko's artwork has been shown internationally and featured in books and magazines related to the field of outsider art. An exhibition at the National Schizophrenia Fellowship in 1994 first brought his art to public attention; he is now represented in the Collection de l'art brut in Lausanne. He had a show at Kinz + Tillou Gallery in New York City in 2006. Some of Blinko's artwork was featured at the Portland, Oregon art exhibit "Entartete Kunts" in June 2009. In 2011, he had a solo exhibit titled "Visions of Pope Adrian 37th" at Pallant House Gallery in the U.K.

Colin Rhodes' Outsider Art: Spontaneous Alternatives, published by Thames & Hudson in 2000, featured Blinko's art and a description of his working process.

== Personal life ==
Blinko was born in Watford and lives in Abbots Langley, Hertfordshire. He has been diagnosed with schizoaffective disorder. Blinko's younger brother is Timothy Blinko, composer and Professor of Music at the University of Hertfordshire.
