= Corpus Christi Records =

British record label

- Founder: Crass, John Loder
- Genre: Anarcho-punk
- Country of origin: United Kingdom

Corpus Christi Records is a British independent record label started by some of the members of Crass and their recording engineer and business partner John Loder, to release records by artists who did not perhaps fit in with some of the stricter ideals of the Crass Records label.

Several of the artists on the label had debuted with 7-inch single/EP releases on Crass Records, but Corpus Christi was used for future releases. According to Crass' Penny Rimbaud, the label was set up to allow artists who had started on the Crass label to set up their own record deal with Loder of Southern Studios under Crass' guidance. Some of the artists on the label, however, such as UK Decay, Icons of Filth, and the American band Crucifix were signed by Loder without any prior involvement with Crass.

The label was active between 1982 and 1987, and its releases were regularly placed highly in the UK Indie Chart, with Conflict's It's Time to See Who's Who LP topping the indie album chart in 1983. The label reappeared in the late 2000s to put out a compilation of two early Conflict 7-inch EPs on a 12-inch.

== Catalogue ==
Chart placings shown are from the UK Indie Chart.

- Christ It's 1 (1982) UK Decay – Rising From The Dread 12-inch EP (#9)
- Christ It's 2 (1983) The Very Things – "Gong Man" 7-inch
- Christ It's 3 (1983) Conflict – It's Time To See Who's Who LP (#1)
- Christ It's 4 (1983) Conflict – To a Nation of Animal Lovers EP (#4)
- Christ It's 5 (1983) Omega Tribe – No Love Lost LP (#2)
- Christ It's 6 (1983) Rudimentary Peni – Death Church LP (#3)
- Christ It's 7 (1983) Icons of Filth – Used, Abused, Unamused 7-inch EP (#20)
- Christ It's 8 (1983) The Cravats – The Colossal Tunes Out LP
- Christ It's 9 (1983) The Fits – "Tears of a Nation" 7-inch (#15)
- Christ It's 10 (1984) Annie Anxiety – Soul Possession LP (#7)
- Christ It's 11 (1983) Crucifix – Dehumanization LP (#7)
- Christ It's 12 (1984) Omega Tribe – "It's a Hard Life" 7-inch/12" (#5)
- Christ It's 13 (1984) Alternative – If They Treat You Like Shit, Act Like Manure LP
- Christ It's 14 (1985) Lack of Knowledge – Sirens are Back LP
- Christ It's 15 (1987) Rudimentary Peni – The EP's of RP 12-inch
- Christ It's 16 (198?) Conflict – The House That Man Built / To A Nation of Animal Lovers 12-inch

== See also ==
- List of record labels
