= James Marsters =

American actor (born 1962)

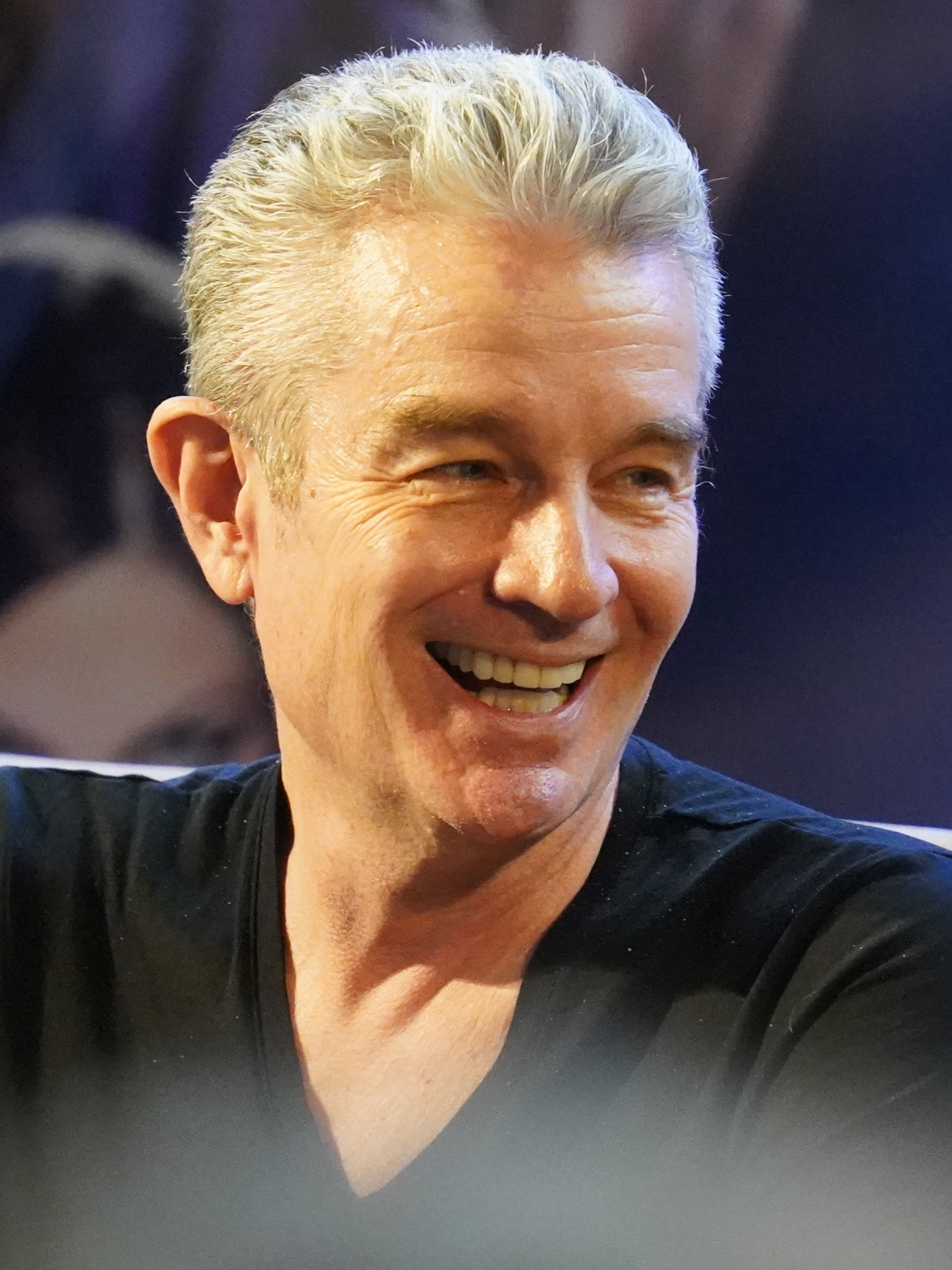
- Marsters at 2023 Comic Con Brussels
- Born: James Wesley Marsters; August 20, 1962 (age 64); Greenville, California, U.S.
- Other names: David Gray; Sam Majesters
- Education: Allan Hancock College; Juilliard School
- Occupations: Actor; musician; comic book writer; audiobook narrator
- Years active: 1987–present
- Spouses: Liane Davidson (m. 1989; div. 1997) Patricia Jasmin Rahman (m. 2011; div. 2021)
- Children: 2

Signature
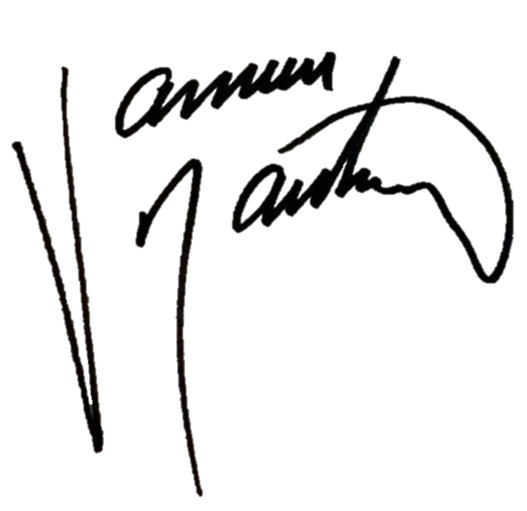

James Wesley Marsters (born August 20, 1962) is an American actor, musician and comic book writer.

He is best known for his role as the British punk vampire Spike in the television series Buffy the Vampire Slayer and its spin-off, Angel. Since then, he has played the alien supervillain Brainiac along with Professor Milton Fine and Brainiac 5 on the Superman-inspired series Smallville, Captain John Hart on Torchwood and terrorist Barnabas Greeley in Syfy's Caprica.

He appeared in a supporting role in the film P.S. I Love You, as Victor Hesse in the 2010 reboot of Hawaii Five-0, and Victor Stein in the Marvel series Runaways. He is also the voice of Zamasu along with Future Zamasu for the Funimation dub of the Dragon Ball franchise. He made a guest appearance in the show Supernatural as a warlock business tycoon in a tumultuous marriage with a witch (played by Buffy castmate Charisma Carpenter). He starred in the critically acclaimed two-part indie film A Bread Factory by director Patrick Wang. He also voiced the roles of Lex Luthor in the film Superman: Doomsday and the video game DC Universe Online, Sergei in Spider-Man: The New Animated Series, Mister Fantastic in The Super Hero Squad Show, Korvac in Ultimate Spider-Man, Captain Faro Argyus in Star Wars: The Clone Wars, Louis 'Match' Morris in Real Heroes: Firefighter, Nosferatu in DuckTales and various voices in Scooby-Doo! Mystery Incorporated.

He is sometimes credited in various anime series and video games as David Gray and Sam Majesters in the series Dragon Ball Super and the video game Dragon Ball FighterZ respectively.

== Early life ==
Marsters was born in Greenville, California, the son of a United Methodist minister and social worker. He grew up with his brother, Paul, and sister, Susan, in Modesto, California. Dreaming about becoming an actor since he played Eeyore in Winnie-the-Pooh in 4th grade, Marsters joined the theatre group at Grace M. Davis High School and acted in many plays, including musicals. After graduation in 1980, Marsters studied at the Pacific Conservatory of the Performing Arts at Allan Hancock College in Santa Maria, California. In 1982, he moved to New York City to attend the Juilliard School, but was expelled from the program after just two years.

== Acting career ==
=== Early roles ===
Marsters moved to Chicago, where his first professional acting role was Ferdinand in The Tempest at the Goodman Theatre in 1987. In this production, he was rolled onto the stage strapped naked to a wheel. He talks about this experience and his other theatrical roles at length in a 2020 interview with Michael Rosenbaum on the podcast 'Inside of You'. He also appeared with well-known Chicago companies such as the Northlight and the Bailiwick and with his own group, the Genesis Theatre Company. Marsters was nominated for a Joseph Jefferson Award for his performance of the lead role of Robespierre in the six-hour drama Incorruptible: The Life, Death and Dreams of Maximilian de Robespierre in 1989.

In 1990, he moved to Seattle and, with Liane Davidson and Greg Musick, formed the New Mercury Theatre. In this and other companies, Marsters was involved in a wide range of plays, including Teechers (a British play by John Godber), Anouilh's Antigone, an original work based on the Dr. Seuss books, and Shaw's Misalliance.

In 1992, he got his first TV acting job on Northern Exposure, in which he appeared for two episodes as a bellboy and a church minister. He has made guest appearances on television series including Andromeda, as well as the independent films Chance (2002), Winding Roads (1999), and the USA Network film Cool Money (2005). In 1999, he had a small role in the remake of House on Haunted Hill as a TV cameraman.

=== Buffy the Vampire Slayer and Angel ===
Marsters attracted the general public's attention for his appearance as villain, and later anti-hero, Spike on season 2 of the television series Buffy the Vampire Slayer. For the role, Marsters spoke with a north London accent, for which he received informal coaching from British co-star Anthony Head.

Spike had been intended as a short role by creator Joss Whedon, who originally resisted Spike's popularity. "He made it very clear he did not want the show to be taken over by another romantic vampire," Marsters told 411Mania, adding "to Joss, vampires were supposed to be ugly, evil, and quick to be killed ... when I was cast Joss did not imagine me to be popular; Spike was supposed to be dirty and evil, punk rock, and then dead." The massive fan response prevented his character from being killed off, allowing Spike a presence throughout the second season.

There were no plans to bring Spike back as a regular on Buffy, until the character Cordelia Chase was moved to the spin-off show, Angel, and, as Marsters told 411Mania, "they needed someone to tell Buffy she was stupid and about to die, and [so] they decided to bring me back." Marsters thought Spike would not last because, being a vampire, Spike was restricted to night-time scenes and could not feasibly interact with human characters as often as Cordelia. Surprisingly, Spike would become a romantic partner for Buffy, and Marsters remained a main cast member until the very end of the show.

After the conclusion of Buffy, Marsters carried Spike over to its spinoff, Angel, as a series regular in its fifth and final season. Marsters was asked to keep quiet about this, as his return was intended to be a surprise, but the network promoted Spike's return as soon as it could, in order to create media buzz and attract advertisers.

In April 2004, following the end of Angel, Marsters had Spike's trademark bleached hair shaved off for charity live on television during an episode of On Air with Ryan Seacrest.

When Angel was cancelled, there were plans for several television films based on the characters from the Buffy/Angel universe. Talk of a Spike film began in 2004, and Whedon still had plans into 2006 before they were formally abandoned. Marsters said he would only return to play Spike if the project took place within five years, feeling he would become too old to play the character (an immortal) after that:

As long as I could do it within, say, the next four or five years; past that, I'm too old. Spike's a vampire, man, and I've got high standards.

— James Marsters, TV Guide Interview, March 3, 2005

Aside from playing Spike, Marsters co-wrote a comic book one-shot for Dark Horse Comics, Buffy the Vampire Slayer: Spike and Dru. After Buffy the Vampire Slayer and Angel ended, Marsters became active with the canonical comic book series of both shows, particularly with stories centering around his character. A canonical graphic novel set during the seventh season of Buffy the Vampire Slayer, Spike: Into the Light, written by Marsters himself, was released by Dark Horse Comics on July 16, 2014.

=== Other work ===
Marsters has narrated the audiobooks for The Dresden Files, a series of detective novels with a supernatural bent and the side short story collection in the same universe, Side Jobs, were also recorded by Marsters. He did not originally record the Dresden book Ghost Story due to a scheduling conflict, leaving fellow Smallville alumnus and actor John Glover to record it; this caused a fairly noteworthy public outcry by audiobook listeners. He returned for the following book Cold Days. On March 24, 2015, Jim Butcher announced that a new version of the Ghost Story audiobook was to be released on April 21, 2015, with Marsters returning as the narrator in response to fan demands.

In 2005, Marsters filmed a thriller, Shadow Puppets, with Jolene Blalock. Late that year, Marsters appeared on the television series Smallville playing Dr. Milton Fine—the popular Superman villain Brainiac—in eight episodes throughout the show's fifth season. He reprised his role as Brainiac in a four-episode arc in the seventh season, and did a cameo voice-over in season eight. He returned for one episode in the show's final season. On October 29, 2005, Marsters presented two performances of his own abridged adaptation of Shakespeare's Macbeth with American actress Cheryl Puente as Lady Macbeth, followed by question and answer sessions with the audience and acoustic concerts in London.

In September 2006, Marsters' interpretation of Godber's Teechers was performed on the Queen Mary with two other actors in Los Angeles. This is a play he had received critical acclaim for as a stage actor prior to his television work. Marsters co-starred in the 2007 cinematic release of P.S. I Love You alongside Kathy Bates, Hilary Swank, and Gerard Butler. Released in September 2007, Marsters starred in the direct-to-DVD animated film, Superman: Doomsday, providing the voice of iconic villain Lex Luthor. The film received mostly positive reviews.

In 2008, he guest-starred in Torchwood, a spin-off of the popular British science fiction television series Doctor Who, first appearing in the episode "Kiss Kiss, Bang Bang", as the nefarious omnisexual time traveller Captain John Hart. He reprised the role in the last two episodes of the second season.

He portrayed "Piccolo Daimao" in the live-action film adaptation of the popular Dragon Ball manga and anime, directed by James Wong and produced by Stephen Chow, which was released worldwide on April 10, 2009 and performed poorly both critically and financially.

On July 20, 2009, the film Moonshot aired on the History Channel in celebration of the 40th Anniversary of the 1969 Apollo 11 Moon landing. In this film, Marsters portrays Buzz Aldrin. On August 19, 2009, it was announced that he signed on for a role in Caprica as the terrorist leader Barnabas Greeley.

Also in August 2009, Marsters' science fiction western, High Plains Invaders aired on the Syfy Channel. In this alien invasion flick, Marsters portrays Sam Danville. It was announced in August 2010 that Marsters would be joining the cast of Syfy Channel series Three Inches as a series regular portraying Troy Hamilton, a former government agent who now leads a team of superheroes.

On June 24, 2011, Marsters appeared in an L.A. Theatre Works radio production of The Importance of Being Earnest, in the part of Sir John Worthing, which aired on June 25, 2011.

He has appeared on Supernatural in the episode "Shut Up, Dr. Phil", which aired October 21, 2011, alongside fellow Buffyverse co-star Charisma Carpenter. He also appeared in Warehouse 13 in 2013 as Bennett Sutton alongside fellow Buffyverse alumnus Anthony Stewart Head.

In 2018, some sources speculated that Marsters is the voice actor of Dragon Ball Super character Zamasu. In October 2021, at Fan Expo Canada, both Marsters and Dragon Ball Super voice director Christopher Sabat publicly confirmed that he voiced Zamasu under the pseudonym of David Gray. As a fan of the Dragon Ball franchise, Marsters agreed to play the role of Zamasu in Dragon Ball Super at the suggestion of Sabat himself and Sean Schemmel when they met during a convention. Marsters did so entirely for free in order to "redeem himself with the Dragon Ball Z community" after his appearance in the poorly received film Dragon Ball: Evolution.

== Musical career ==
Marsters had played in bands and solo in bars and clubs for many years and enjoyed several successful sell-out solo gigs at Los Angeles clubs before forming a band. For these solo gigs he mainly performed covers of classic folk and rock musicians such as Tom Waits, Neil Young, James Taylor, and Bruce Springsteen. He sang in "Once More, with Feeling", a musical episode of Buffy: solo parts in "Walk Through the Fire" and "Something To Sing About", and "Rest in Peace" completely on his own.

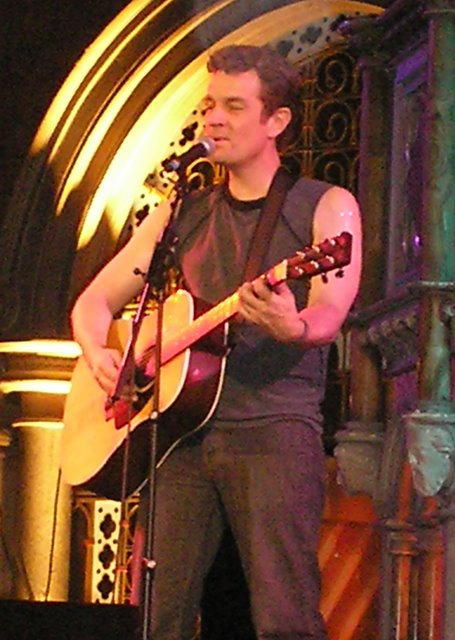
James Marsters performing at the Union Chapel Concert in Islington, London on May 4, 2007

In 2003–04, Marsters was the lead singer for the rock band Ghost of the Robot. Their debut album Mad Brilliant was released on February 2, 2003. The band played its first gigs in Los Angeles and Paris. They went on to play successful dates in and around Los Angeles and two sold-out tours of Europe in 2003 and 2004. In addition to Mad Brilliant, they released three singles ("Valerie", "David Letterman" and "New Man") and one mid-length EP, It's Nothing. All these releases carried tracks written and co-written by Marsters. Several of Ghost of the Robot's earlier songs were loosely based on the Buffy the Vampire Slayer characters Buffy, Dawn, and Faith.

Marsters' solo musical career was launched in October 2004, in London. His solo acoustic tour of the United Kingdom in April 2005 sold out. A new solo album "Civilized Man" produced by Chris Rhyne and Andrew Rosenthal was released on April 15, 2005. It includes several new songs as well as the popular "Katie" and "Smile". He has played songs from the album live in Detroit, Houston, and Sacramento. Ten of the eleven songs are written by Marsters.

New solo songs not included on the album but sung at live solo concerts include "Birth of the Blues", "Finer than Gold", "Louise", and "London City". "Finer than Gold", "London City", and "Louise" were composed while on tour in the UK in April 2005. "Birth of the Blues" was composed by Marsters in Amsterdam in 2004 while touring with his now-defunct band. During his October 2005 mini-tour of the UK, Marsters introduced other new songs to his sets: "Button Down Vandals", "Up On Me", and "All That She Wanted". These songs were available only as part of his recently released Words and Music DVD, which has his abridged version of Macbeth as well as a full-length solo music performance.

During his September 2006 convention, James Marsters & Friends, he debuted several new songs including "The Truth Is Heavy", "Fall of Night", "Jealous Man", and "Not A Millionaire". All these songs reflect his new blues music and folk sound. He also performed a cover version of Keb Mo's classic "Baby Blue". In 2007, he performed live several times in the UK and debuted two new songs written in Cardiff. "Layabout" and "Looking at You" reflect a more upbeat light folk move in Marsters' music. These songs as well as some of his previously unrecorded work were released on Marsters' second solo album, formally launched in Los Angeles and Cardiff in October and November 2007 respectively. This album, Like a Waterfall, includes twelve songs, all written by Marsters. Most had been performed and recorded live but not in the studio. An exception is "When I Was a Baby", a song never previously performed in public.

Like a Waterfall was produced by Ryan Shore and features several other musicians including Blair Sinta, who has drummed for Alanis Morissette, and Five for Fighting bass player Curt Schneider. In 2008, Marsters' Waterfall Tour came to the UK. He played the first three dates across London and performed for three consecutive days in Milton Keynes. The concert at the packed Union Chapel in Islington was an acoustic set featuring material from his album—Like A Waterfall.

On May 1, 2009, he returned to the Union Chapel, followed by a "Marstersclass" event at The Drill Hall, in London on May 2. The sell-out event included a concert, Q&A session plus opportunities to get autographs and photos. On May 3, 2009, he performed at London's 100 Club.

In 2010, Ghost of the Robot re-formed and released the album B-Sider. In 2011, their album Murphy's Law was released. They have also released multiple EPs. In 2023, Ghost of the Robot released the album Tin Man. It includes the song "Don't Worry Son," which Marsters wrote while he was working on Buffy the Vampire Slayer.

== Personal life ==
Marsters is divorced from Liane Davidson, with whom he has one son (born 1996). In 2002, Marsters began raising his five-year-old niece, whom he now regards as his daughter.

It was announced on May 21, 2010, that Marsters had proposed to girlfriend Patricia Rahman in Trier, Germany. On January 14, 2011, they married in a private civil ceremony in Los Angeles. In February 2021, the couple filed for divorce.

== Discography ==
As a solo artist:

- Civilized Man (2005)
- Like a Waterfall (2007)

With California-based rock band Ghost of the Robot:

- Mad Brilliant (2003)
- B-Sider (2011)
- Murphy's Law (2011)
- Bourgeois Faux Pas (2015)
- Pair of Bulls, Vol.1 (2018)
- Tin Man (2023)

== Filmography ==
=== Film ===
Year	Title	Role	Notes
1999	Winding Roads	Billy Johnson	
1999	House on Haunted Hill	Channel Three Cameraman	
2002	Chance	Simon	
2007	Shadow Puppets	Jack	
2007	Superman: Doomsday	Lex Luthor	Voice, direct-to-video
2007	P.S. I Love You	John McCarthy	
2009	Dragonball Evolution	Lord Piccolo	
2015	Billie Bob Joe	Himself	Cameo
2015	Dudes & Dragons	Lord Tensley	Dragon Warriors (working title)
2016	New Life	William Morton	
2018	A Bread Factory (Part 1)	Jason	
2018	A Bread Factory (Part 2)	Jason	
2019	Grief	Tom	Short
2023	Abruptio	Les Hackel	
2024	Isla Monstro	Reggie	Voice

=== Television ===
Year	Title	Role	Notes
1992–1993	Northern Exposure	Bellhop, Rev. Harding	2 episodes
1995	Medicine Ball	Mickey Collins	Episode: "Heart and Sole"
1997	Moloney	Billy O'Hara	Episode: "Herniated Nick"
1997–2003	Buffy the Vampire Slayer	Spike	Recurring role (seasons 2–3); main role (seasons 4–7)
1999–2004	Angel	Spike	Guest role (seasons 1–2); main role (season 5)
1999	Millennium	Eric Swan	Episode: "Collateral Damage"
2001	The Enforcers	Charles Haysbert	Miniseries
2001	Strange Frequency	Mitch Brand	Segment: "Soul Man"
2001	Andromeda	Charlemagne Bolivar	Episode: "Into the Labyrinth"
2003	Spider-Man: The New Animated Series	Sergei	Voice, 2 episodes
2004	The Mountain	Ted Tunney	Episode: "A Piece of the Rock"
2005	Cool Money	Bobby Comfort	Television film
2005–2010	Smallville	Dr. Milton Fine, Brainiac, Brainiac 5	Recurring role
2007–2008	Without a Trace	Detective Mars	4 episodes
2007	Saving Grace	Dudley Payne	Episode: "Bring It On, Earl"
2008	Torchwood	Captain John Hart	3 episodes
2008	The Capture of the Green River Killer	Ted Bundy	Miniseries
2008	Star Wars: The Clone Wars	Capt. Faro Argyus	Voice, episode: "Cloak of Darkness"
2009	Moonshot: The Flight of Apollo 11	Buzz Aldrin	Television film
2009	High Plains Invaders	Sam Denville	Television film
2009	Numb3rs	Damien Lake	Episode: "Guilt Trip"
2009	The Super Hero Squad Show	Mister Fantastic	Voice, 5 episodes
2009	Lie to Me	Pollack	Episode: "Truth or Consequences"
2010	Caprica	Barnabas Greeley	4 episodes
2010–2020	Hawaii Five–0	Victor Hesse	5 episodes
2011	Supernatural	Don Stark	Episode: "Shut Up, Dr. Phil"
2011	Three Inches	Troy Hamilton	Episode: "Pilot"
2012–2014	Metal Hurlant Chronicles	Brad Davis, Doc Rowan	2 episodes
2013	Wedding Band	Declan Horn	Episode: "Personal Universe"
2013	Warehouse 13	Prof. Bennett Sutton	3 episodes
2013	Scooby-Doo! Mystery Incorporated	Dandy Highwayman, Librarian, Man	Voice, episode: "Stand and Deliver"
2013	Ultimate Spider-Man	Korvac, Chitauri #3	Voice, episode: "Guardians of the Galaxy"
2014	Witches of East End	Tarkoff	7 episodes
2015	The Devil You Know	Rev. George Burroughs	Pilot
2017–2019	Runaways	Victor Stein / Jonah / Magistrate	Series regular
2018	Dragon Ball Super	Zamasu	English dub; credited as David Gray
2020	The Order	Xavier	Episodes "The Common" Part 1 & 2
2020	DuckTales	Nosferatu	Voice, episode: "The Trickening!"
2021	Leverage: Redemption	Carl Bishop	Episode: "The Golf Job"
2023–2024	Curses!	Larry	Voice; series regular
2023	Casa Grande	Miller Dalton	3-episodes

=== Video games ===
Year	Title	Role	Notes
2002	Buffy the Vampire Slayer	Spike	
2003	Buffy the Vampire Slayer: Chaos Bleeds	Spike	
2009	Real Heroes: Firefighter	Louis "Match" Morris	
2010	DC Universe Online	Lex Luthor	
2017	Dragon Ball Xenoverse 2	Zamasu	Credited as David Gray
2018	Dragon Ball FighterZ	Zamasu	Credited as Sam Majesters
2020	Dragonball Legends	Zamasu	
2024	Dragon Ball: The Breakers	Zamasu	
2024	Dragon Ball: Sparking! Zero	Zamasu	Credited as David Gray

=== Audio dramas ===
Year	Title		Role	Notes
2018	Torchwood: Monthly Range	Episode: "The Death of Captain Jack"	Captain John Hart	
2020	Torchwood: The Sins of Captain John		Captain John Hart	
2023	Hollow's Bend: The Radio Play	Episodes: "Part 1: The Loophole," "Part 2: I'll Be Damned," & "Part 3: The Ritual"	Malcolm Teller	
2024	Dark Gallifrey: The War Master	Episodes: "Part 2" & "Part 3"	Captain John Hart	

== Audiobooks ==
The Dresden Files
Year	No.	Title
2002	1	Storm Front
2003	2	Fool Moon
2005	3	Grave Peril
2007	4	Summer Knight
2009	5	Death Masks
2010	6	Blood Rites
2010	7	Dead Beat
2009	8	Proven Guilty
2009	9	White Night
2008	10	Small Favor
2009	11	Turn Coat
2010	12	Changes
2010	12.5	Side Jobs
2015	13	Ghost Story
2012	14	Cold Days
2014	15	Skin Game
2015	15.5	Working for Bigfoot
2018	15.75	Brief Cases
2020	16	Peace Talks
2020	17	Battle Ground
2026	18	Twelve Months

The Dark Artifices by Cassandra Clare
Year	No.	Title
2017	2	The Lord of Shadows
2018	3	The Queen of Air and Darkness

The Vampire Empire by Clay and Susan Griffith
Year	No.	Title
2012	1	The Greyfriar
2013	2	The Rift Walker
2014	3	The Kingmakers

The Untamed City by Melissa Marr
Year	No.	Title
2012	1	The Carnival of Secrets

== Awards and nominations ==
Year	Award	Category	Nominee	Result
2000	Teen Choice Awards	Choice TV: Sidekick	Buffy the Vampire Slayer	Nominated
2000	Saturn Awards	Best Performance by a Supporting Actor in a Series	Buffy the Vampire Slayer	Nominated
2001	Saturn Awards	Best Performance by a Supporting Actor in a Series	Buffy the Vampire Slayer	Won
2002	Teen Choice Awards	Choice TV: Actor	Buffy the Vampire Slayer	Nominated
2002	Saturn Awards	Cinescape Genre Face of the Future Award	Buffy the Vampire Slayer	Won
2002	Saturn Awards	Best Performance by a Supporting Actor in a Series	Buffy the Vampire Slayer	Nominated
2002	SFX Awards	Best Comedy Performance	Buffy the Vampire Slayer	Won
2002	SFX Awards	Best TV Actor	Buffy the Vampire Slayer	Won
2003	Teen Choice Awards	Choice TV: Actor	Buffy the Vampire Slayer	Nominated
2003	Saturn Awards	Best Performance by a Supporting Actor in a Series	Buffy the Vampire Slayer	Won
2003	Golden Satellite Awards	Best Performance by a Supporting Actor in a Series	Buffy the Vampire Slayer	Nominated
2004	Saturn Awards	Best Performance by a Supporting Actor in a Series	Angel / Buffy the Vampire Slayer	Nominated
2004	Spacey Awards	Favourite TV Character—Male	Spike in Angel	Won
2005	Saturn Awards	Best Performance by a Supporting Actor in a Series	Angel	Nominated
2011	S.E.T. Awards	The Documentary S.E.T. Award	Moonshot: The Flight of Apollo 11	Won
