= The Dresden Files short fiction =

Besides the novels of The Dresden Files, author Jim Butcher has written several shorter works appearing in the same universe. Most are told from the point of view of Harry Dresden, as are the novels, but some take the point of view of other characters.

== Works ==
=== "Something Borrowed" ===
While getting fitted for his role as best man to William Borden as the latter marries his long-time girlfriend Georgia, Harry Dresden discovers that Georgia has gone missing, and goes looking for her. With the help of Karrin Murphy, he manages to bring her back to the wedding, unconscious and under a spell, only to find that Jenny Greenteeth has taken Georgia's place at the wedding. Dresden manages to convince William to awake his rightful partner, to disastrous results for Jenny Greenteeth.

Set between Dead Beat and Proven Guilty, Something Borrowed was published in My Big Fat Supernatural Wedding (October 3, 2006, ISBN 0-312-34360-4).

=== "It's My Birthday, Too" ===
On Valentine's Day, Harry Dresden remembers he has got a birthday present for his brother Thomas Raith and arranges to meet him at the Woodfield Mall in Schaumburg, where Thomas is taking part in a vampire-themed LARP. The play is disrupted by a revenant, an old friend of the players who turned into a Black Court vampire to seek revenge.

Set between White Night and Small Favor, It's My Birthday, Too was published in Many Bloody Returns (September 4, 2007, ISBN 978-0-441-01522-1).

=== "Heorot" ===
Harry Dresden has been alerted that a young bride has disappeared from the Night of Living Brews just hours after her wedding, along with a cask of mead. Dresden and Mouse set to find her. They are joined by Ms. Gard only to find that the young woman has been kidnapped by a descendant of Grendel, who needs mead in order to breed a child of his own. Dresden and Gard make short work of the grendelkin and bring back the bride to her rightful husband.

Set between White Night and Small Favor, "Heorot" was published in My Big Fat Supernatural Honeymoon (December 26, 2007, ISBN 978-0-312-37504-1). It was also reprinted in Side Jobs.

=== "Harry's Day Off" ===
Harry Dresden has finally a day off his many commitments and responsibilities, and plans to use it for a date with Anastasia Luccio. Dresden's so carefully laid plans, however, are disrupted by Molly Carpenter needing a lesson in potion-making, and by Andi and Kirby needing a thorough cleansing to get rid of psychophagic mites.

Set between Small Favor and Turn Coat, Harry's Day Off was published in Blood Lite (October 21, 2008, ISBN 1-4165-6783-6). It was later reprinted in Side Jobs as Day Off.

=== "Backup" ===
Dresden is hot on the trail of a kidnapped child, when Thomas Raith is alerted that a member of the Stygian Sisterhood is in town. His job is to stop and kill her, before she can complete her activities. In the chase, Thomas finds that she is behind the child's kidnapping, and that her purpose is to bring Harry down. He manages, all the while keeping his brother unaware of the fact. Narrated from Thomas Raith's point of view.

Set between Small Favor and Turn Coat, Backup was published independently by Subterranean Press. It featured artwork by Mike Mignola. It was later reprinted in Side Jobs without Mignola's artwork.

=== "The Warrior" ===
Pictures of Michael Carpenter's family are being sent to Harry Dresden. Unsure of their meaning but feeling that his friend and his friend's family are in danger, Harry warns Michael to stay alert and begs him to pick up the sword Amoracchius again. Michael refuses, aware that anyone who lays down a Sword of the Cross cannot pick it up again. An attempt to steal the sword is unsuccessful, and Harry learns that a rogue priest is responsible. The priest kidnaps Michael's daughter Alicia and offers to release her in return for both Amoracchius and Fidelacchius (the sword entrusted to Harry in Death Masks). The exchange is foiled, and the priest is captured.

Set between Small Favor and Turn Coat, The Warrior was published in Mean Streets (January 6, 2009, ISBN 978-0-451-46249-7). It was later reprinted in Side Jobs.

=== "Last Call" ===
A spell is placed on MacAnally's famed beer hall in order to control the spectators to a sport's game at the United Center in Chicago. Dresden and Murphy manage to link it back to Meditrina Bassarid, a maenad, and, with difficulty, they manage to subdue her.

Set between Small Favor and Turn Coat, Last Call was published in Strange Brew (July 7, 2009, ISBN 978-0-312-38336-7). It was later reprinted in Side Jobs.

=== "AAAA Wizardry" ===
Harry Dresden instructs a class of young Wardens on methods for investigating supernatural phenomena, using one of his own past cases as an example. He describes the four A's of his technique (Ascertain, Analysis, Assemble, Act), but warns them to beware of a fifth A (Arrogance).

Set between the May following Small Favor and the events of Turn Coat, "AAAA Wizardry" was published in Volume Two: Our World of "The Dresden Files Roleplaying Game" (June 15, 2010, ISBN 978-0-9771534-8-0). It was later reprinted in Brief Cases.

=== "Even Hand" ===
On a mission for Lara Raith, Justine visits Johnny Marcone to request shelter for herself and a child under the terms of the Unseelie Accords. Marcone reluctantly agrees to harbor her for the child's sake, using a formidable range of magical and mundane weaponry to stop the Fomor pursuing them. In the aftermath of the battle, Marcone reflects on the effectiveness of his defenses and how he plans to use them against Harry Dresden in the future. Narrated by Marcone.

Set between Turn Coat and Changes, "Even Hand" was published in Dark and Stormy Knights (July 20, 2010, ISBN 0-312-59834-3). It was later reprinted in Brief Cases.

=== "Restoration of Faith" ===
While working as a private investigator, Harry Dresden finds a runaway he'd been hired to locate, a young girl named Faith. When he calls in his success to his partner, he learns that the girl's parents have reported her as being kidnapped to save face, and they plan to accuse him of the crime. Harry decides to bring the girl in anyway, but is stopped by a troll which has taken up residence under a bridge he needs to cross. When he confronts the troll, he is unexpectedly aided by a uniformed police officer named Karrin Murphy. Dresden manages to win the fight and, with Murphy's help, ensures that the girl is returned safely to her family.

Set before Storm Front, Restoration of Faith was published on Jim Butcher's web site. It was later reprinted in Side Jobs.

=== "Publicity and Advertising" ===
Bob and Harry have a discussion about how to write a Yellow Pages ad for Harry Dresden's business. Bob thinks that Harry's ad copy is boring and uninteresting, while Harry dismisses Bob's suggestions as deceptive or unbelievable. Eventually, Harry wins out and goes back to working on formulas. Formulae.

Set between Death Masks and Blood Rites, Publicity and Advertising was published on Jim Butcher's web site. It was later reprinted in Side Jobs as Vignette.

=== "Aftermath" ===
Harry Dresden has just been shot, and the police are checking the scene of the crime on Thomas Raith's boat. Karrin Murphy joins them only to hear that the body has not been found. Refusing to accept Harry's death as fact, Murphy starts moving on with her life, strengthening her contacts in Chicago's supernatural community and trying to do her duty as both a policewoman and as a member of the supernatural group. When Will Borden's wife Georgia and her friend Andi go missing, Murphy's investigation leads her first to Johnny Marcone and then to a group of Fomor that are vying to fill the power vacuum left by Harry's extermination of the Red Court. Narrated by Murphy.

Set between Changes and Ghost Story, Aftermath was published exclusively in Side Jobs (October 26, 2010).

=== "Love Hurts" ===
Karrin Murphy calls Harry Dresden in on a series of weird double suicides, and they find that all the dead can be linked to a carnival outside Chicago, prompting further investigation. A Red Court vampire is discovered there, casting spells on couples, forcing them to fall in love. Since love is a mortal's sole defense against being fed upon by a member of the White Court, widespread use of the spell would cause the White Court's food supply to dwindle, giving advantage to the Red Court.

Set between Turn Coat and Changes, Love Hurts was published in Songs of Love and Death (November 16, 2010, ISBN 1-4391-5014-1). It was later reprinted in Side Jobs.

=== "Curses" ===
Harry is hired to look into the Curse of the Billy Goat, which has plagued the Chicago Cubs in the postseason for decades, and try to lift it if possible. The case leads him to the king of the Tylwyth Teg, who cast the curse himself and has been renewing it every year. After a friendly talk with the king, a longtime Cubs fan, Harry decides not to interfere and risk costing the team its loyal fan base.

Set between Small Favor and Turn Coat, Curses was published in Naked City: Tales of Urban Fantasy (July 5, 2011, ISBN 978-0-312-38524-8). It was later reprinted in Brief Cases.

=== "I Was a Teenage Bigfoot" ===
The teenage scion of a Sasquatch and a woman, Irwin Pounder is virtually immune to disease. When his parents learn that he has fallen ill at the boarding school he attends, they hire Harry to find out if something is wrong. Harry visits Irwin and discovers that someone is using dark magic to drain energy from his aura. The culprit proves to be the school's headmaster, who has been magically regrowing his hair to reverse his baldness. Harry orders him to stop or face reprisals from the White Council, and Irwin quickly recovers.

Set between Dead Beat and Proven Guilty, I Was a Teenage Bigfoot was published in Blood Lite 3: Aftertaste (May 29, 2012, ISBN 978-1451636246). It was later reprinted in Brief Cases and Working for Bigfoot.

=== "Bigfoot on Campus" ===
Strength of a River in His Shoulders, a Bigfoot, asks Harry to look in on his half-human son Irwin Pounder, who is attending college and playing football. Harry discovers that Irwin's girlfriend Connie is a White Court vampire whose powers have little effect on him. When her father tries to psychically force her to have sex with Irwin and fatally drain his life force, Harry and River Shoulders intervene to save them both. Irwin meets his father for the first time, the price Harry set for helping, and he and Connie quietly disappear from campus.

Set between Turn Coat and Changes, Bigfoot on Campus was published in Hex Appeal (June 5, 2012, ISBN 978-0312590727). It was later reprinted in Brief Cases and Working for Bigfoot.

=== "B is for Bigfoot" ===
Strength of a River in His Shoulders is a Bigfoot who has a son, Irwin Pounder, by an archaeologist he met during a dig. When River learns that Irwin is being bullied at school, he worries about the boy's safety and hires Harry Dresden to investigate. Harry learns that Irwin's tormentors are under the protection of a svartalf who threatens to kill Harry if he interferes, but Harry finds a way for Irwin to solve the problem on his own.

Set between Fool Moon and Grave Peril, B is for Bigfoot was published in Under My Hat: Tales From the Cauldron (August 28, 2012, ISBN 978-0375868306). It was later reprinted in Brief Cases and Working for Bigfoot.

=== "Bombshells" ===
In the months after Harry Dresden's death, Molly Carpenter is on the run, living on the road and keeping under the White Council's radar, all the while being tutored by the Leanansidhe on the arts of survival and magical fighting. Encounters and skirmishes with the Fomor are increasingly frequent, until the Leanansidhe sends her in a mission to Svartalfheim in order to rescue Thomas Raith from execution. Molly discovers that a treaty of neutrality between the Fomor and the svartalves is to be signed in a few hours and that the Fomor mean to explode a bomb during the ceremony causing numerous deaths, and sets out to prevent it. Her life turns for the better after succeeding. Narrated by Molly Carpenter.

Set between Ghost Story and Cold Days, Bombshells was published in Dangerous Women (December 3, 2013 ISBN 978-0765332066). It was later reprinted in Brief Cases.

=== "Jury Duty" ===
Harry receives a summons for jury duty and is assigned to serve on a murder trial. The case seems straightforward at first, but the arresting officer's testimony leads him to believe that supernatural factors are at work. With help from Will Borden, he learns that the defendant, a member of Gentleman Johnny Marcone's criminal organization, had acted to save a girl from being fed on by a member of House Malvora in the White Court. House Raith has ordered the girl to be abducted so that she cannot exonerate the defendant with her testimony, wanting to see him punished for killing one of their kind. Harry and Will free her, and Harry manages to deadlock the jury and cause a mistrial. The prosecutor drops the charges, and the judge realizes that Harry found the missing girl and would have been able to expose the White Court's activities by producing her to testify at a retrial.

Jury Duty was published in Unbound. Set after Skin Game, it was later reprinted in Brief Cases.

=== "Cold Case" ===
Less than a week after becoming the new Winter Lady, Molly Carpenter is sent to Alaska to find out why a race of Fae creatures called the Miksani have stopped paying their usual tribute to the Winter Court. While investigating, she happens across Warden Carlos Ramirez, who has been dispatched by the White Council to look into unusual supernatural activity in the area. They find that a cult devoted to an ancient god has abducted the Miksani's children and is planning to sacrifice them in a ritual meant to awaken him. Molly and Ramirez kill the cultists and free the children; afterward, she realizes that they are the tribute Queen Mab has been expecting, and that they will become soldiers in the ongoing battle against the Outsiders. She also discovers, after a disastrous night with Ramirez, that any attempt at physical intimacy with another person will leave them badly injured due to the mantle of her power acting to protect itself. Narrated by Molly.

Set between Cold Days and Skin Game, Cold Case was published in Shadowed Souls. It was later reprinted in Brief Cases.

=== "Day One" ===
During training for his new role as a Knight of the Cross, Waldo Butters takes on the challenge to help a homeless man in need of medical attention. After he and Michael Carpenter check the man into a hospital, Waldo sees one of the doctors exhibiting decidedly non-human behavior and inflicting nightmares on several patients. He learns from Harry that this adversary is a rogue baku; it gets the better of him at first, but he later destroys it after learning to control his own fear. The experience leaves Waldo shaken, but Michael reassures him that he did the right thing by giving the baku a chance to reform first.

Day One was published in the anthology Unfettered II. Set after Skin Game, it was later reprinted in Brief Cases.

=== "A Fistful of Warlocks" ===
Anastasia Luccio, a Warden for the White Council, is pursuing a few dangerous characters and ends up in Dodge City, home of Wyatt Earp.

A Fistful of Warlocks was published in the anthology Straight Outta Tombstone. It is set in the late 1800s. It was later reprinted in Brief Cases.

=== "Zoo Day" ===
Harry, his daughter Maggie, and his dog Mouse try to enjoy a day at the zoo, only for each to face a supernatural threat - a young warlock for Harry, a pack of haunts for Maggie, and Mouse's discovery that his own brother is orchestrating events to target them both. A Rashomon-style story told alternately from each character's separate point of view.

Set after Skin Game, Zoo Day was published exclusively in Brief Cases (June 5, 2018).

=== "Christmas Eve" ===
On Christmas Eve, Harry Dresden is struggling to assemble a bicycle as a gift for his daughter Maggie, and his dog Mouse tries to help him. He receives three visitors, all bearing various gifts. First is Queen Mab, who gives him a ring for Maggie; it will grant her some influence over the forces of Winter for one day and play "Let It Go" from the Disney film Frozen. Next is Molly, with news that the medical and funeral expenses for all the victims of the previous summer's battle against Ethniu have been paid in full. Finally, Donar Vadderung (in his mantle of Kringle, the real Santa Claus) brings Harry a coffee mug he had given his father for Christmas, evoking warm holiday memories of his childhood. Maggie wakes up just in time to see Vadderung disappear up the chimney and fly off into the night with his sleigh and team of reindeer.

Set six months after Battle Ground, "Christmas Eve" was published on December 20, 2018, as a blog post on Butcher's website New Short Story: Christmas Eve. The publication was supposed to be available on December 24, but due to the large number of readers the site was crashed. To solve that problem the story was moved to Google Docs.

One year later, "Christmas Eve" was republished as an illustrated edition in a blog post on Butcher's site Christmas Eve 2019, with illustrations by Adam Mathison-Sward and art direction by Priscilla Spencer. The story was made available on Google Drive.

This story was republished in Battle Ground.

=== "Monsters" ===
Goodman Grey accepts a cleaning job from John Marcone - a competing criminal cartel has opened a brothel in Marcone's territory against his rules and interests.

Monsters was published in the anthology Parallel Worlds.

The story is set after Skin Game.

=== "Mike" ===
Harry Dresden brings his car to Mike Atagi for repairs, and is offered a choice among "cheap", "fast" and "good".

Set between White Night and Small Favor, Mike is a microfiction, and was published on author's website in blog post Welcome to the Year of Dresden! as part of the "Year of Dresden" celebration for The Dresden Files 20th anniversary.

=== "Journal" ===
Donald Morgan muses about his relationship to Harry Dresden.

Set at the time of Turn Coat, Journal is a microfiction, and was published on author's website in blog post Morgan Microfiction, RPG Art, and More! as part of the "Year of Dresden" celebration for The Dresden Files 20th anniversary.

=== "Goodbye" ===
Jared Kincaid is hired to shoot Harry Dresden. For this, The Archive informs him that his services will no longer be required.

Set at the end of Changes, Goodbye is a microfiction, and was published on author's website in blog post Microfiction #3, Con Swap, and Virtual Signing as part of the "Year of Dresden" celebration for The Dresden Files 20th anniversary.

=== "Job Placement" ===
Irwin Pounder and Connie Barrowill contemplate a new job and their futures together.

Taking place after Skin Game, Job Placement is a microfiction, and was published in the blog post Job Placement as part of the "Year of Dresden" celebration for The Dresden Files 20th anniversary.

=== "Everything the Light Touches" ===
Mister, Dresden's cat, thinks about the people in his life as he goes through a relaxing day.

"Everything the Light Touches" is a microfiction, and was published in the blog post Everything the Light Touches as part of the "Year of Dresden" celebration for The Dresden Files 20th anniversary.

=== "The Good People" ===
Molly Carpenter and Kringle deliver gifts to people of Chicago. Narrated by Molly Carpenter.

Set concurrently with Christmas Eve, The Good People is a microfiction, and was published in the blog post The Good People as part of the "Year of Dresden" celebration for The Dresden Files 20th anniversary.

=== "Little Things" ===
Toot-Toot discovers an invader unbeknownst to the wizard Harry Dresden and in order to defeat it, he'll have to team up with the dread cat Mister.

"Little Things" was published in the anthology Heroic Hearts.

=== "The Law" ===
Dresden and Marcone enter into battle; both the legal kind and the kind with explosions.

The Law is a novella and audiobook from Jim Butcher, with Butcher narrating the story. The audiobook was released exclusively through Audible, while a limited print version was released through Subterranean Press.

=== “Fugitive" ===
Cerberus calls on Mouse for assistance in capturing the Nemean Lion, which has escaped from the underworld.

“Fugitive" was published in March 2023, as part of the short fiction collection Instinct: An Animal Rescuers Anthology. Profits from the sale of this title will be donated to Lifeline Puppy Rescue.

== Stories by internal chronology ==
#	Title	Publication year	Preceded by	Followed by	Collection
1	"A Fistful of Warlocks"	2017	-	Storm Front	Brief Cases
2	"Restoration of Faith"	2010	-	Storm Front	Side Jobs
3	"B is for Bigfoot"	2012	Fool Moon	Grave Peril	Brief Cases
4	"Publicity and Advertising"/"Vignette"	2010	Death Masks	Blood Rites	Side Jobs
5	"Something Borrowed"	2006	Dead Beat	Proven Guilty	Side Jobs
6	"I Was a Teenage Bigfoot"	2012	Dead Beat	Proven Guilty	Brief Cases
7	"AAAA Wizardry"	2009	Proven Guilty	White Night	Brief Cases
8	"It's My Birthday, Too"	2007	White Night	Small Favor	Side Jobs
9	"Heorot"	2007	White Night	Small Favor	Side Jobs
10	"Mike"	2020	White Night	Small Favor	Dresden Drop
11	"Harry's Day Off"	2008	Small Favor	Turn Coat	Side Jobs
12	"Backup"	2008	Small Favor	Turn Coat	Side Jobs
13	"The Warrior"	2009	Small Favor	Turn Coat	Side Jobs
14	"Last Call"	2009	Small Favor	Turn Coat	Side Jobs
15	"Curses"	2011	Small Favor	Turn Coat	Brief Cases
16	"Love Hurts"	2010	Turn Coat	Changes	Side Jobs
17	"Bigfoot on Campus"	2012	Turn Coat	Changes	Brief Cases
18	"Even Hand"	2010	Turn Coat	Changes	Brief Cases
19	"Journal"	2020	Turn Coat	-	Dresden Drop
20	"Goodbye"	2020	Changes	Aftermath	Dresden Drop
21	"Aftermath"	2010	Changes	Ghost Story	Side Jobs
22	"Bombshells"	2013	Ghost Story	Cold Days	Brief Cases
23	"Cold Case"	2016	Cold Days	Skin Game	Brief Cases
24	"Jury Duty"	2015	Skin Game	Peace Talks	Brief Cases
25	"Day One"	2016	Skin Game	Peace Talks	Brief Cases
26	"Zoo Day"	2018	Skin Game	Peace Talks	Brief Cases
27	"Monsters"	2019	Skin Game	-	-
28	"Job Placement"	2020	Skin Game	Peace Talks	Dresden Drop
29	"Everything the Light Touches"	2020	Skin Game	Peace Talks	Dresden Drop
30	"Little Things"	2022	Battle Ground	-	-
31	"The Law"	2022	Battle Ground	-	-
32	"Christmas Eve"	2018	Battle Ground	-	-
33	"The Good People"	2020	Battle Ground	-	Dresden Drop
34	"Fugitive"	2023	Battle Ground	-	-

Dresden Drop - Microfiction published on the author's website "Year of Dresden", a 20th anniversary of the publication of the first book in The Dresden Files, Storm Front.

== Collections ==
=== Side Jobs ===
Side Jobs
- Author: Jim Butcher
- Cover artist: Christian McGrath
- Language: English
- Series: The Dresden Files
- Genre: Urban fantasy/Mystery novel
- Publisher: Roc Hardcover
- Publication date: October 26, 2010 (hardcover—US only); November 11, 2010 (audio book)
- Publication place: United States
- Media type: Print (hardcover)
- Pages: 418

Side Jobs was published on October 26, 2010, as a collection of most of the existing short stories in the series at the time. All of the short stories published therein took place between novels, and were ordered chronologically. Aftermath, the final novella in the collection, was first included in this publication and is set after the novel Changes.

Story order

1. "A Restoration of Faith"
2. "Vignette" (aka "Publicity and Advertising")
3. "Something Borrowed"
4. "It's My Birthday, Too"
5. "Heorot"
6. "Day Off"
7. "Backup"
8. "The Warrior"
9. "Last Call"
10. "Love Hurts"
11. "Aftermath"

=== Working for Bigfoot ===
Working for Bigfoot
- Author: Jim Butcher
- Illustrator: Vincent Chong
- Language: English
- Series: The Dresden Files
- Genre: Urban fantasy/Mystery novel
- Publisher: Subterranean Press
- Publication date: June 30, 2015
- Publication place: United States
- Pages: 131

Working for Bigfoot was published on June 30, 2015. It is a collection of three novellas in which Harry works for River Shoulders to keep his half-human son out of trouble. The stories had been previously published in other anthologies, and were later incorporated into the 2018 collection Brief Cases (see below).

Story order

1. "B Is for Bigfoot"
2. "I Was a Teenage Bigfoot"
3. "Bigfoot on Campus"

=== Brief Cases ===
Brief Cases
- Author: Jim Butcher
- Cover artist: Christian McGrath
- Language: English
- Series: The Dresden Files
- Genre: Urban fantasy/Mystery novel
- Publisher: ACE
- Publication date: June 5, 2018 (hardcover—US only)
- Publication place: United States
- Media type: Print (hardcover)
- Pages: 437

Brief Cases was published on June 5, 2018, as a collection of Dresden Files short stories. The stories take place between the events of the novels in the series and are arranged in chronological order. Zoo Day, the final novella in the collection, was first included in this publication and is set after the novel Skin Game.

Story order

1. "A Fistful of Warlocks"
2. "B is for Bigfoot"
3. "I Was a Teenage Bigfoot"
4. "Curses"
5. "AAAA Wizardry"
6. "Bigfoot on Campus"
7. "Even Hand"
8. "Bombshells"
9. "Cold Case"
10. "Jury Duty"
11. "Day One"
12. "Zoo Day"
