= Mean Streets (anthology) =

- Author: Jim Butcher, Kat Richardson, Simon R. Green, Thomas E. Sniegoski
- Language: English
- Genre: Urban fantasy
- Publisher: Roc Books
- Publication date: January 6, 2009
- Publication place: United States
- Media type: Print (Trade paperback)
- Pages: 368 pp
- ISBN: 0-451-46249-1
- OCLC: 233548413

Mean Streets is a 2009 anthology of four novellas featuring protagonists from four urban fantasy series. The book promotes the characters and authors to existing readers of genre, as well as provides new readers to the genre a sample of each series. It was well-received as providing good, intriguing stories consistent with style of each series. The four stories collected in this book are "The Warrior" from The Dresden Files series by Jim Butcher, "The Difference a Day Makes" from the Nightside series by Simon R. Green, "The Third Death of the Little Clay Dog" from the Greywalker series by Kat Richardson, and "Noah's Orphans" from the Remy Chandler series by Thomas E. Sniegoski.

== Contents ==
"The Warrior" featuring Harry Dresden from The Dresden Files series by Jim Butcher

Private investigator, and wizard, Harry Dresden warns his friend Michael Carpenter that someone is spying on him. Carpenter, a former heavenly warrior in the Knights of the Cross, was living a quiet life in Chicago with his wife and children after suffering injuries in his last battle. They find someone is trying to steal Carpenter's enchanted sword. After an attack Dresden suspects church involvement and seeks clues from Father Forthill. The kidnapping of Carpenter's daughter leads to confrontation near Millennium Park with a rogue holy warrior named Roarke Douglas to exchange the sword for Carpenter's daughter.

"The Difference a Day Makes" featuring John Taylor from the Nightside series by Simon R. Green

In Nightside, private investigator John Taylor and his friend Dead Boy are sitting in a bar called Strangefellows when a crying woman, named Liza, bursts in seeking Taylor's help. She cannot remember the past day, nor how she arrived in Nightside. Taylor uses his power of Sight to locate her husband, Frank. Dead Boy drives them to Rotten Row, where they find Frank at Silicon Heaven, a place for technosexuals. The host explains that Liza was there the day before but fled after learning about what Frank wanted. As Frank is being merged with a machine, Liza storms in and rips his heart out, though the Frank-machine no longer required it to live.

"The Third Death of the Little Clay Dog" featuring Harper Blaine from the Greywalker series by Kat Richardson

The will of a Mexican woman leaves private investigator, and Greywalker, Harper Blaine a sum of money on condition she hand-deliver a small figurine of a dog to the grave of Hector Purecete in Oaxaca City on the Day of the Dead. Even though these people are unknown to her, she accepts. On the way to Oaxaca she meets the dead woman's lawyer who tries to dissuade her from continuing. In Oaxaca she enlists the help of the teenage son, Mickey, of her host in helping her navigate the city and translating. While visiting a graveyard, Blaine finds another figurine just like the dog and is told that hers had been subject to witchcraft. After a few dead ends, she eventually finds the grave of the correct Hector Purecete and the fraud and blackmail by the lawyer that necessitated the elaborate set up.

"Noah's Orphans" featuring Remy Chandler from the Remy Chandler series by Thomas E. Sniegoski.

Remy Chandler, a private investigator and former angel known as Remiel, is grieving the recent death of his wife, Madeline, when the angel Sariel, of The Grigori, visits and informs him that Noah has been murdered. Sariel recruits the reluctant Remy to investigate and transports him to the oil rig where Noah had been living to examine the murder scene. With Remy as a witness, Sariel captures a suspect and tells Remy that the suspect is a Chimerian, a species created by God prior to humans and previously thought to have been wiped out in Noah's flood. Remy investigates further and discovers that Noah may have been sympathetic to the Chimeria. Ultimately, he concludes that Noah was protecting the remaining Chimeria and that it was the Grigori who had killed Noah in an attempt to complete the extinction of the Chimeria.

== Style and genre ==
Mean Streets is an anthology, collecting four novellas. Each story is an original piece in four existing urban fantasy series published by Roc Books. The book was meant to cross promote series between one another, so fans of one series could try something similar or new readers could sample several styles in the subgenre. While all four series use a private investigator as their main character, "The Warrior" of The Dresden Files, set in Chicago between Small Favor and Turn Coat, used more "dry wit", while the Nightside story "The Difference a Day Makes" used more "darker humor". "The Third Death of the Little Clay Dog" uses more "mystery and intrigue", as well as Mexican culture in the backdrop. "Noah's Orphans", set between the novels A Kiss Before The Apocalypse and Dancing On The Head of a Pin of the Remy Chandler series, is a murder mystery that uses biblical figures, like Noah and Sariel, as characters.

== Publication and reception ==
The book was released January 4, 2009, as a trade paperback published by Roc Books, an imprint in the Penguin Group. An unabridged audiobook version, narrated by Dion Graham, Richard Poe, Mia Baron, T. Ryder Smith, was released in April 2009.

The book was well-received, with the reviewer in Publishers Weekly writing, "All [stories are] solid and suspenseful, these stories are sure to please", and Kimberly Swan of Darque Reviews writing, "They're equally well-told and intriguing ... This is a keeper that will easily rise to the top of the list of favorite anthologies for fans of the genre." Similarly, book reviewer Harriet Klausner wrote "Each tale is well written feeling complete even in the novella format and complement one another as the writers rose to the occasion of expectations from their fan base." The critic at Monsters and Critics concluded that "Imaginative, yet humanizing storylines with familiar characters make this collection a treat and a great introduction for readers new to the genre."

The Publishers Weekly reviewer selected Sniegoski's "Noah's Orphans" as the best of the four stories noting that "Sniegoski manages to make a far-fetched setup both plausible and moving". The editor at SFRevu wrote "the depth of characterization and emotional conflict [in "Noah's Orphans"] stands out". The Entertainment Examiner reviewer identified both "Noah's Orphans" and Butcher's "The Warrior" as equally the best stories saying “Both Sniegoski and Butcher infuse their characters...with solid, relatable emotion that truly makes you care about what is going on. Their action and dialogue is tense and engaging, even in the calmest scene, and the details they use are vivid enough to create a strong mental image of the scene without taking over the story." Other reviewers found "The Warrior" to be typical of the Harry Dresden series. Richardson's "The Third Death of the Little Clay Dog" was called "a delightful tale" and "an intriguing mystery" that "neatly merges noir conventions with a fantastical plot", though the characterization was panned as being "flat and inexpressive". Though described as "a roller coaster ride of a story" and "wildly imaginative" Green's "The Difference A Day Makes" was found to employ "gratuitous macabre writing" in trying to describe "increasingly twisted and depraved scenarios, using the same stock descriptions and dialogue". Another reviewer wrote that "Green goes overboard" describing Nightside so that "story is more about the setting than any actual plot...[making] the ending feel like a letdown".
