= Skin Game (novel) =

2014 fantasy novel by Jim Butcher

- Author: Jim Butcher
- Cover artist: Christian McGrath
- Language: English
- Genre: Detective, Contemporary fantasy, Urban fantasy
- Published: Roc Books
- Publication date: May 27, 2014
- Publication place: United States
- Pages: 608 pp
- ISBN: 978-0-451-46439-2 (US); 978-0-356-50090-4 (UK)
- Preceded by: Cold Days
- Followed by: Peace Talks

Skin Game is a novel in The Dresden Files series by Jim Butcher. It is the 15th novel in the series. It follows the protagonist, Harry Dresden as he teams up with former enemies to rob a vault belonging to Hades, lord of the Underworld.

== Plot ==
Harry Dresden, still living on the island of Demonreach, is unable to reach his allies and plagued by increasing headaches due to a parasitic spirit growing in his mind. Queen Mab demands he undertake a job, but in return offers her aid with the parasite. Harry is to help Nicodemus steal something from the vault of Hades. Wary of the potential for betrayal, he enlists the aid of Karrin Murphy to watch his back.

Harry and Karrin meet Nicodemus and his crew, which includes Binder and a female warlock, Hanna Ascher, and soon Anna Valmont, the only surviving member of the group of thieves who had stolen the Shroud of Turin in Death Masks. Harry accompanies Nicodemus's daughter Deirdre and the shape-shifting Goodman Grey to collect a sample from an insider, Harvey Morrison, who is quickly killed when Tessa unexpectedly intervenes. Dresden learns that the heist's target is the Holy Grail. At the third meeting, they realize that they are being spied upon by Waldo Butters. Giving chase, Harry manages to keep Binder's henchmen from catching him with the help of Bob. Nicodemus catches up with Dresden, Murphy and Butters on the street in front of Michael Carpenter's house, and a fight ensues. Murphy draws Fidelacchius and is tricked into using the sword to attempt to kill Nicodemus while defenseless, which results in the sword's shattering and Murphy being badly wounded. Michael then appears, offering to leave his angel-protected house in exchange for the release of Harry, Karrin and Butters. Nicodemus accepts the deal, but before Michael leaves, Uriel appears, giving Michael Amoracchius and his own Grace so that Michael can fight effectively. Nicodemus surrenders the fight and agrees to accept Michael as Harry's replacement for the wounded Murphy. That night while recovering at the Carpenters', Harry reconnects with his daughter Maggie for the first time since he saved her life at Chichen Itza in Changes.

As the heist begins, the group breaks into a high security vault owned by John Marcone, where Dresden opens a Way to Hades' vault in the Nevernever. Ascher and Dresden open the Gates of Fire and Ice respectively, and Deirdre willingly allows Nicodemus to kill her so that her spirit can open the final Gate of Blood. Once inside the vault, Dresden and Valmont find an altar holding not only the Grail, but four other artifacts associated with the crucifixion of Jesus. Harry realizes that the vault is actually an armory, and Hades stops time to discuss the situation privately with him. Hades uses the vault to store powerful artifacts and weapons until those with the knowledge and power to wield them properly can claim them.

Armed with this knowledge, Dresden hides three artifacts in Valmont's bag and one in his sleeve before Nicodemus and the others arrive to claim the Grail. Nicodemus takes the Grail but turns on Harry and Michael after Harry angrily calls him out on murdering his own daughter for his schemes, as Valmont has gone back to the vault's entrance. Ascher and the Genoskwa (an aggressive Bigfoot) are revealed to be the new hosts for the fallen angels Lasciel and Ursiel, respectively. Nicodemus orders them and Grey to attack, breaking his agreement with Mab and leaving Harry free to act as he sees fit.

It is then revealed through a flashback that Harry had earlier hired Grey to back him up in anticipation of this fight. Grey takes on the Genoskwa/Ursiel, Dresden fights Ascher/Lasciel, and Michael fights Nicodemus after making a final appeal to his humanity. After Dresden manages to bury Ascher in a rockfall and Michael sends Nicodemus running, Grey blinds the Genoskwa, allowing the three of them to escape. On the way out, Dresden activates the Gate of Ice to crush the pursuing Genoskwa.

Dresden opens a Way and the four of them depart the Nevernever, but before they can close the Way, Nicodemus escapes and heads for Michael's house, trapping the others in Marcone's vault. The team escapes with help from Binder, and Harry and Grey hurry to confront Nicodemus at Michael's home. During the final fight, Butters takes up the broken Fidelacchius, which emits a lightsaber-style blade, and chases off Nicodemus again. He agrees to become a Knight of the Cross. Molly Carpenter, Michael's daughter and Harry's former apprentice, now the new Winter Lady, arrives in time to safely remove the parasitic spirit from Harry's head.

Afterwards, the group divide up a backpack full of diamonds Valmont stole from Hades' vault. Grey turns down a share of them, instead accepting one dollar from Harry as his fee, and Harry uses that share as a weregild to pay for the death of Marcone's vault guard. He deduces that Mab, Hades, and Marcone conspired to let Nicodemus carry out the heist in order to destroy his reputation, as revenge for his earlier kidnapping of Marcone and the Archive, and confronts Mab and Marcone with his conclusions. He then visits Karrin in the hospital and the two share a passionate kiss and agree to try an actual relationship. Talking with Michael that evening, Harry reflects over the events of the past few days, and together they worry about a few things including Harry's future as the Winter Knight.

== Introduced characters ==
- Hades: the Greek God of the Underworld.
- The Genoskwa: an aggressive, Bigfoot-like vessel for the Fallen Angel Ursiel.
- Goodman Grey: a half-human, half-naagloshii mercenary hired as part of Nicodemus' heist team.
- Hannah Ascher: a human warlock wanted by the White Council. She is the vessel for the Fallen Angel Lasciel, with both motivated by revenge upon Dresden.

== Reception ==
The book debuted at number 1 on the New York Times best seller list in the week of June 6, 2014.

In 2015, Skin Game was a finalist for the 2015 Hugo Award for Best Novel.
