= Humility Garden =

Humility Garden is a novel by Felicity Savage published by ROC in 1995.

== Plot summary ==
Humility Garden is a novel that is written in the form of an unfinished biography of the character Humility Garden.

== Reception ==
Steve Faragher reviewed Humility Garden for Arcane magazine, rating it a 4 out of 10 overall. Faragher comments that "There is a lot to this book: an outline of a fascinating world, a lot of thoughtfulness and a desire to tackle large topics. Sadly, there is almost no enjoyment to complement that."

== Reviews ==
- Review by Faren Miller (1995) in Locus, #409 February 1995
- Review by Peter Heck (1995) in Asimov's Science Fiction, November 1995, (1995)
- Review by Tom Easton (1995) in Analog Science Fiction and Fact, September 1995, (1995)
- Review by Cavan Scott (1996) in SFX, July 1996
- Review by Paul Di Filippo (1997) in Asimov's Science Fiction, January 1997
