= Hulick =

Hulick is a surname. Notable people with the surname include:

- Douglas Hulick, (born 1965), American writer
- George W. Hulick (1833–1907), American lawyer, judge and politician
