= GOTR =

GOTR may refer to:

- Operational Group of Russian Forces, or Grupul Operativ al Trupelor Ruse in Romanian
- Girls on the Run, a girl-oriented American NGO
- Ghost of the Robot, an American band based in California
