= Hog Hollow =

Valley in Missouri, United States

Coordinates: 36.8622782°N 91.4934720°W

Hog Hollow is a valley in Oregon County in the U.S. state of Missouri.

Hog Hollow was so named on account of the abundance of hogs in the valley.

== In popular culture ==
In The Dresden Files, Ebenezar McCoy, a farmer and wizard from Hog Hollow, takes on Harry Dresden as an apprentice after Dresden's trial by the White Council.
