= Battle Ground (novel) =

2020 novel by Jim Butcher

- Author: Jim Butcher
- Cover artist: Christian McGrath
- Language: English
- Series: The Dresden Files
- Genre: Detective, Contemporary fantasy, Urban fantasy
- Publisher: Ace Books
- Publication date: September 29th, 2020
- Publication place: United States
- Media type: Hardcover
- Pages: 432
- ISBN: 978-0-593-19930-5
- Dewey Decimal: 813/.6
- LC Class: PS3602.U85 B88 2020
- Preceded by: Peace Talks
- Followed by: Twelve Months

Battle Ground is a novel by Jim Butcher and is the 17th novel in The Dresden Files. Battle Ground was published on September 29, 2020 by Little, Brown Book Group. In it Harry Dresden, the protagonist, attempts to stop the Titan Ethniu from destroying Chicago.

The book also contains a short story, "Christmas Eve," originally published on Butcher's website in 2018.

== Plot ==
In the aftermath of the Titan Ethniu's declaration of war against humanity, Harry Dresden returns from Demonreach with his lover Karrin Murphy and temporary allies, Lara Raith and Freydis Gard, when their ship gets attacked by a kraken, which they manage to kill with the help of Molly Carpenter before reaching Chicago. Harry and Murphy rush to warn their local friends in the Paranet about the upcoming war, and Harry charges Murphy with keeping the group out of trouble while he meets with the rest of the Accorded Nations, including John Marcone, who are ready to defend the city from the Titan and her Fomor army.

When the Fomor scouts attack, Harry goes out to fight them off with the support of the sasquatch River Shoulders. Joined by several Wardens and Listens-to-Wind, Harry reaches Graceland Cemetery, where they find Drakul and several Black Court vampires, Mavra among them, trying to carry out a necromantic ritual, and they engage in a fight. While the vampires leave, they do so on their own accord after killing Wardens Yoshino and Wild Bill and sending Chandler somewhere unknown. Harry is attacked by the Fomor, but is saved by the appearance of the Knights of the Cross and Murphy.

Taking refuge in a building, the group meets with Ebenezer McCoy and several Einherjar, as Ethniu enters the battle and uses the Eye of Balor to destroy a building. Several Jotun attack, and the Einherjar fight them, killing many of them at the cost of their own lives, as the group retreats towards Cloud Gate, where Mab is gathering her forces and acting as bait for Ethniu to attack. Harry leads a group of Fae to a nearby childcare to help evacuate the people inside, among them Internal Affairs agent Rudolph. Fomor and Jotun attack the childcare, with one of the Jotun facing off against Harry until Murphy uses a bazooka to kill him. Rudolph becomes hysterical and murders Murphy by accident; Harry almost kills him in revenge, but Sanya and Butters stop him in time.

Returning to The Bean, the Fomor begin to attack as an army, with Harry fighting and leading groups of both Fae and normal Chicagoans into the fight, suffering hundreds of deaths while inflicting high losses on the attacking Fomor, until Ethniu arrives. Harry joins Queen Mab and helps in the fight against the Titan while Molly and Marcone bring in reinforcements and several powerful individuals keep fighting against Ethniu in order to weaken her. Lara manages to strike Ethniu in the back of the head, causing her to lose the Eye of Balor, which Marcone grabs and takes towards the lake, with Harry following to carry out his part of the plan. Ethniu follows and nearly kills Marcone (who turns out to have been a Denarian since the events of Small Favor), but Harry manages to ensnare her and defeat her in a battle of wills, imprisoning the Titan within Demonreach. The Fomor retreat after Ethniu's defeat.

As calm begins to return, Goodman Grey brings Justine (Thomas's lover), who asks to be allowed to see Thomas. Harry takes her to the Water Beetle, but while trying to rest realizes that Thomas had tried to warn him that Justine was the one who caused him to attack Etri; when Harry confronts her, she reveals that she has been possessed by Nemesis, who wanted to access Demonreach so it could free all of the island's prisoners. Harry jumps out of the ship and lets Demonreach attack it, preventing Nemesis from reaching its target, but it manages to escape, taking Justine away.

A wake is held for the people deceased in the battle. Carlos Ramirez tells Harry that the White Council has decreed to expel him and that he is no longer allowed to act as a wizard, but he replies that he will continue to act as Chicago's protector, no matter what others say. He later crashes a meeting of the Accorded Nations, stating that they owe the people of Chicago compensation for how the supernatural war has affected their lives, and manages to get Marcone to give up the Better Future Society castle to him, as it was built over the ruins of Harry's former apartment; Harry plans to use it as a fortress for himself and his allies. Mab announces that Harry and Lara will be married in one year's time to cement an alliance between the Winter Court and the White Court and forces Molly to oversee preparations. Harry takes Molly to her family's home so she can tell her parents of her position as the Winter Lady, a secret she has kept from them, but discovers that they already know and are not angry with her. Promising to discuss the situation with Molly, they invite her and Harry to dinner.

== Reception ==
Publishers Weekly wrote that "with this urban fantasy blockbuster, Butcher swiftly pays off on the major cliffhanger from Peace Talks, launching wizard Harry Dresden and the city of Chicago into a no-holds-barred battle".
