= Eric B. Vogel =

- Occupation: Game designer

Eric B. Vogel is a clinical psychologist, a professor of psychology, and a game designer.

== Career ==
=== Professor of Psychology ===
As a Doctor of Psychology, Vogel was a professor at John F. Kennedy University in Pleasant Hill, California from 2002 to 2021. Since 2021 he has been a professor in the John F. Kennedy School of Psychology at National University in Pleasant Hill, California, and since 2023 he has been a professor in the California Northstate University College of Psychology in Rancho Cordova, California. He is the 2009 winner of the Eugene Benjamin Sagan award for Outstanding Teaching in Psychology. His research has been published in the Journal of Phenomenological Psychology and The International Journal of Sport Psychology.

=== Game Designer ===
Vogel's game design career began in 2004 with Land of Psymon published by The Creative Therapy Store, a psychotherapeutic game intended to teach children Cognitive behavioral therapy skills by showing them how to defend against psychological monsters ("psymon") that represent negative thinking and common cognitive distortions. The Spanish edition, El Planeta di los Psimon was published by TEA in 2010.

He subsequently switched from designing psychotherapeutic board games to tabletop hobby games. To date, his most successful game has been The Dresden Files Cooperative Card Game, which raised over a half-a-million dollars in a Kickstarter campaign. The game won the 2018 Silver ENnie for Best RPG Related Product. This was produced as part of an ongoing partnership with Evil Hat Productions that has resulted in several releases. The Dresden Files has had 5 published expansions, as well as an electronic version by Hidden Achievement released for Android, IOS, Kindle, Mac, Nintendo Switch, and Windows.

His other published games include: Cambria and Hibernia published in 2011 by Closet Nerd Games, Romans Go Home published in 2014 by Lui-Meme, Zeppelin Attack published in 2014 by Evil Hat Productions, Don't Turn Your Back published in 2015 by Evil Hat Productions, Kaiju Incorporated published in 2016 by Evil Hat Productions, Kitara published in 2020 by Iello, and First Empires published in 2022 by Sand Castle Games. Kitara won the 2021 UK Games Expo Best New Boardgame American-Style Judge's Award and People's Choice.
