= Nightside (novel series) =

Fantasy series by Simon R. Green

Nightside is a series of 12 fantasy novels by British author Simon R. Green.

The series is focused on John Taylor, a private investigator based in the fictional Nightside, a dark, hidden netherworld of London in which the supernatural and science fiction super-technology co-exist. Dark, cynical, and humorous, the books offer an adventure into the Nightside, where classic pulp PI novels blend with fantasy and science fiction.

== Series ==
=== United States ===
1. Something from the Nightside (New York, Ace 2003), ISBN 0-441-01065-2
2. Agents of Light and Darkness (New York, Ace 2003), ISBN 0-441-01113-6
3. Nightingale's Lament (New York Ace 2004), ISBN 0-441-01163-2
4. Hex and the City (New York Ace 2005), ISBN 0-441-01261-2
5. Paths not Taken (New York Ace September 2005), ISBN 0-441-01319-8
6. Sharper than a Serpent's Tooth (Ace February 28, 2006), ISBN 0-441-01387-2
7. Hell to Pay (Ace December 27, 2006), ISBN 0-441-01460-7
8. The Unnatural Inquirer (Ace January 2, 2008), ISBN 0-441-01558-1
9. Just Another Judgement Day (Ace January 6, 2009), ISBN 978-0-441-01674-7
10. The Good, the Bad, and the Uncanny (Ace January 5, 2010), ISBN 0-441-01816-5
11. A Hard Day's Knight (Ace January 4, 2011), ISBN 0-441-01970-6
12. The Bride Wore Black Leather (Ace January 3, 2012), ISBN 1-937007-13-8

=== United Kingdom ===
- Into the Nightside (Nightside Omnibus 1) (Solaris Books, 2008), ISBN 1-84416-642-2: A collection of the first and second Nightside novels.
- Haunting the Nightside (Nightside Omnibus 2) (Solaris Books September 1, 2008), ISBN 1-84416-638-4: A collection of the third and fourth Nightside novels.
- The Dark Heart of the Nightside (Solaris Books October 6, 2008), ISBN 1-84416-635-X: A collection of the fifth and sixth Nightside novels.
- Damned if you Do in the Nightside (Nightside Omnibus 4) (Solaris Books, 2009),: A collection of the seventh and eighth Nightside novels.
- Just Another Judgement Day in the Nightside (Nightside Omnibus 5) (Solaris Books, 2010): A collection of the ninth and tenth Nightside novels.

=== Short fiction ===
These nine stories, along with the new novella The Big Game, were collected in Tales From the Nightside (Ace January 6, 2015).

- "The Nightside, Needless to Say" in Powers of Detection (Ace, 2004), ISBN 0-441-01197-7. An anthology of twelve paranormal detective stories. The Nightside story features Larry Oblivion.
- "Razor Eddie’s Big Night Out" in Cemetery Dance #55, (Cemetery Dance, 2006), ISSN 1047-7675. A short story starring Razor Eddie.
- "Appetite for Murder" in Unusual Suspects (Ace, 2008), ISBN 0-441-01637-5. The Nightside story features Ms. Fate.
- "The Difference a Day Makes" in Mean Streets (Roc, 2010), ISBN 0-451-46306-4. An anthology of assorted novellas tied to existing crime/fantasy series. The Nightside novella features John Taylor and Dead Boy.
- "Some of These Cons Go Way Back" in Cemetery Dance #60 (Cemetery Dance, 2009), ISSN 1047-7675.
- "Hungry Hearts" in Down These Strange Streets (Ace, 2011), ISBN 0-441-02074-7. An anthology edited by George R.R. Martin centering on urban fantasy detectives. This story features John Taylor.
- "The Spirit of the Thing" in Those Who Fight Monsters (Edge, 2011), ISBN 1-894063-48-1.
- "Dorothy's Dream in Oz Reimagined: New Tales from the Emerald City and Beyond (47North 2013), ISBN 978-1611099041. An anthology edited by John Joseph Adams and Douglas Cohen, illustrated by Galen Dara
- "How Do You Feel" in "Hex Appeal" (St. Martin's Griffin, 2012), ISBN 0312590725. An anthology edited by P.N. Elrod. Nightside story that features Deadboy.
