= Like a Waterfall =

Studio album by James Marsters
- Released: 2007
- Genres: Rock, blues

James Marsters chronology
Civilized Man (2005)	Like a Waterfall (2007)

Like A Waterfall is James Marsters' second solo album. In this album, Marsters moves away from his original rock sound, and he plays songs with a much more bluesy feel to them. Marsters held a United Kingdom tour in May 2008 to promote the album.

== Track listing ==
1. Not a Millionaire - 3:42
2. Looking at You - 2:55
3. Don't Worry Son - 3:37
4. Birth of the Blues - 3:19
5. White Hot Girls - 2:48
6. London City - 3:18
7. Up on Me - 3:19
8. Like a Waterfall - 2:57
9. Louise - 2:43
10. When I Was a Baby - 2:51
11. Layabout - 2:54
12. Too Fast - 3:05
