= Changes (Butcher novel) =

2010 fantasy novel by Jim Butcher

- Author: Jim Butcher
- Illustrator: Christian McGrath
- Language: English
- Series: The Dresden Files
- Genre: Detective, Contemporary fantasy, Urban fantasy
- Publisher: Roc Hardcover
- Publication date: April 6, 2010
- Publication place: United States
- Media type: Print (hardcover)
- Pages: 432
- ISBN: 0-451-46317-X
- Preceded by: Turn Coat
- Followed by: Ghost Story

Changes is the 12th book in The Dresden Files, Jim Butcher's continuing series about wizard detective Harry Blackstone Copperfield Dresden. Changes was released on April 6, 2010, and debuted at #1 on The New York Times Best Seller list for Hardcover Fiction, dropping to #3 in its second week on the list.

== Plot summary ==
Susan Rodriguez contacts Dresden to tell him they have a daughter, Margaret Angelica ("Maggie" for short), who has been kidnapped by the Duchess Arianna, the widow of a Red Court duke that Ebenezar McCoy thought he had killed several years earlier. Dresden goes to Edinburgh to seek help from the council. However, upon his arrival, he discovers Arianna is there, hosting a peace conference with the rest of the council. Dresden openly challenges Arianna to a duel to the death over his daughter's kidnapping, but is prevented from carrying it through by the other members of the council. Infuriated, Dresden returns home.

After an explosion destroys his office building, Dresden learns from Karrin Murphy he is under investigation by the FBI. After being released and having a talk with his fairy godmother, Dresden is eventually directed to the Norse God Odin, who tells him that the Red Court is going to use Maggie for a powerful blood curse that will kill everyone related to her, including Dresden. Dresden decides to investigate Rudolph, the Chicago police detective who implicated him in the office explosion, reasoning that he must have implicated Dresden because of pressure coming from the Red Court. During this investigation, he encounters the 'Eebs', a husband and wife team of Red Court vampires who have been sent to both assassinate Rudolph and to dissuade Dresden from going after Arianna. After a close call with them, Dresden returns home, only to have his apartment firebombed. During his subsequent attempts to rescue the other residents in his building, Dresden's back is broken, and Sanya shows up just in the nick of time. With no other options open to him, Harry turns to Queen Mab; accepting her offer of the Winter Knighthood in exchange for her healing his broken spine and granting him the power he needs to save his daughter.

The Leanansidhe, who has been assigned to aid in this quest by Mab, joins in the planning. With help from his godmother, Sanya, Karrin, Thomas, Molly, Susan and Martin, they set out on the first leg of the journey to where his daughter is being held. Along the way, Harry uses a sending stone to communicate with Ebenezar, informing him that Maggie is his daughter. Upon learning this, Ebenezar changes his mind, encourages Dresden to do what he needs to do.

Confronting the Red Court, the Red King grants Harry an audience. The Red King agrees to allow Dresden to duel Arianna in exchange for Maggie's life. After Dresden finally kills her, the Red King refuses to honor their agreement. The group then engages in a seemingly hopeless battle against the Vampires, only to be joined at the height by the Grey Council -including Odin and Ebenezar – and an army of kenku, birdlike creatures from the Nevernever. After a seeming betrayal by Martin that causes Susan to lose control and drink his blood, Dresden learns that all of Martin's actions have been to put someone in a position to destroy the entire Red Court in one blow, namely Susan. The curse had originally been aimed at Ebenezar McCoy, revealed to be Harry's maternal grandfather, through Harry and his daughter. Dresden instead carries Susan to the altar and cuts her throat with her permission, unleashing the Bloodline Curse upon the Red Court and killing every last one, now that Susan had become the youngest vampire of the Red Court. The few half vampires who are not killed by the removal of their vampire halves, as well as the Red King's Mortal followers, are almost all destroyed by the angered captives of the Red Court.

In the aftermath, Dresden concludes he can never provide the sort of home for Maggie he wants her to have. He entrusts her to the care of Father Forthill with a request that she be put in the safest possible place. Later, while recuperating on Thomas' boat, Dresden is shot and falls over the deck rail into Lake Michigan.

== Summary of changes in Harry's life ==
1. Susan Rodriguez reveals the last sexual tryst between her and Harry yielded a daughter Susan named Margaret, named after Dresden's mother.
2. Mac makes a long speech, for him, to Harry regarding Harry's future and his path.
3. Harry's office building is revealed to be owned by The Red Court of Vampires, that building is summarily destroyed by C-4.
4. The White Council and a majority of the Wardens are either struck with a mysterious illness or arrested by Cristos.
5. Harry receives his mother's (Margaret LaFey) collected knowledge of "The Ways".
6. Several of Harry's friends shock him by revealing Molly has always been in love with him.
7. Harry's car, "The Blue Beetle", is crushed by "The Ick" into a ball with Thomas' car.
8. It is revealed that Harry's mentor Ebenezar McCoy is in fact his maternal grandfather.
9. Harry's oak staff (made from an oak tree on McCoy's farm) is destroyed along with the Beetle.
10. Harry's apartment and the entire boarding house where he lives is burned to the ground along with all his possessions.
11. Harry is partially paralyzed trying to rescue his neighbors from the fire.
12. Harry accepts the Mantle of "Winter Knight" from Queen Mab to heal himself and save Maggie from the Red Court.
13. Susan becomes a full Red Court Vampire when she murders Martin during his reveal of working for the Red King.
14. Harry kills Susan as she completes her Red Court transformation enacting the blood curse and destroying the entire court.
15. Murphy apparently loses her job due to Rudolph's continued political maneuvering.
16. Harry is shot and dies at the end of the book.

== Introduced characters ==
- Margaret Angelica Mendoza: eight-year-old daughter of Harry and Susan. She is raised by a family in Guatemala, kidnapped by the Red Court, and nearly killed. Margaret is entrusted to Father Forthill by Harry to hide.
- Agent Barry Tilly: FBI agent investigating the bombing of Harry's office; disbelieves Harry when he, Murphy, and Susan explain the Red Court to him, but sees the attack on the FBI's building in Chicago. Harry calls him "Slim".
- Donnar Vadderung: the one-eyed CEO of Monoc Securities, he is revealed as Odin (who was hinted at being him several times in past stories). He believes in foresight, which enabled him to find where the ritual was being held, as well as the details. Donnar is also a member of the Grey Council.
- The Eebs: Esteban and Esmeralda Batiste, a husband and wife team of Red Court vampires used by the Red King for assassinations. They are torn to shreds by goblins after Harry and Susan proved their claim in a trial by combat.
- Steven Douglas: "Stevie D", hitman, hired to kill Dresden by the Eebs and tricked into thinking Susan had set up the contract.
- Arianna Ortega: Previously mentioned in Proven Guilty, Arianna is the widow of Paolo Ortega, who was killed by Ebenezar after Paolo tried to murder Harry. She found out about Maggie from Martin and had her kidnapped, planning to use her as a human sacrifice to wipe out the Dresden bloodline. She also laced the Council headquarters with a virus and crippled many wizards. Ultimately Harry's arrival gave her father the Red King the chance to give Harry an opening to kill her in a battle to the death. Despite her confidence that she would win the duel she was ultimately bested by Harry, her final words dumbly referring to him as cattle.
- The Red King: The head of the Red Court. Despite being extremely short the Red King was the deadliest vampire in the entire court. What's more he also laid out the details of the Red Court meaning that all of their crimes could be traced back to him. Although he covertly helped Harry by agreeing to accept his petition to fight Arianna (delaying the sacrifice so that the duel could occur) and choosing a weapon that would give Harry a fighting chance he ultimately double crossed him once Harry destroyed Arianna. He tried to hijack the ritual himself to gain the prestige Arianna would have gained, but Martin's calculated gambit to have Susan kill him gave Harry and Lea an opening to destroy the prison created by the Lords of the Outer Night. Harry then overpowered the Red King by impaling his eyes, setting them on fire, and shattering his right forearm. At this point, the Red King called his soldiers to kill Harry, forcing Harry to sacrifice Susan to destroy the Red Court forever.

== Aftermath, Ghost Story and beyond ==
The story continues in Aftermath, told from Karrin Murphy's point of view and running from roughly forty five minutes after the end of Changes. The story was released as part of Side Jobs, an October 2010 anthology of Dresden short stories and focuses on Murphy's efforts following Dresden's apparent death.

The next novel in the series, the thirteenth Dresden novel, is titled Ghost Story. Author Jim Butcher's publishers wouldn't let him call it the more prosaic Dead. He has also confirmed that Changes marks the midpoint of Harry's story and there will be at least 7 more books, possibly 10, to finish Harry's story. In addition, despite the previous books playing out in more or less real time, with the elapsed time between books approximately equaling the time between their release dates, Ghost Story has been confirmed as taking place immediately after the conclusion of Changes, though Butcher has also equated the immediate jump to Ghost Story as being akin to the Back to the Future series: time jumps, implying that what seems to be happening within moments of the end of Changes may actually be happening over a much longer timespan.
