= Cold Days =

2012 fantasy novel by Jim Butcher

- Author: Jim Butcher
- Cover artist: Christian McGrath
- Language: English
- Series: The Dresden Files
- Genre: Detective, Contemporary fantasy, Urban fantasy
- Publisher: Roc Hardcover
- Publication date: November 27, 2012
- Publication place: United States
- Media type: Print (hardcover)
- Pages: 528
- ISBN: 978-0-451-46440-8
- Preceded by: Ghost Story
- Followed by: Skin Game

Cold Days is a 2012 bestselling novel by Jim Butcher and the 14th book in the ongoing The Dresden Files series. The book was first published on November 27, 2012 through Roc Hardcover and continues the adventures of wizard detective Harry Dresden.

== Plot summary ==
As the story begins, Harry is in Arctis Tor where he is nursed back to health by Sarissa, a member of the Winter Court and a servant of Mab, the Winter Queen. His recovery culminates in a Winter Court party, serving both as an introduction of the new Winter Knight and as Harry's surprise birthday party. During the party he is set up by Maeve, the Winter Lady, who sets a number of events in motion in an attempt to kill him. With help from Sarissa and advice from Kris Kringle, he defeats Maeve's minions and asserts himself as the Winter Knight before the entire Winter Court. Mab, quite satisfied at this outcome, gives Harry his first mission as the new Winter Knight: to kill Maeve.

Harry returns to Chicago and consults Bob, to find out how to go about killing an immortal. Bob is initially reluctant to give out such dangerous information, but eventually tells Harry that immortals can be killed during certain conjunctions, such as on Earth on Halloween night, the day after tomorrow. Harry meets up with Molly, who informs him that energy is growing on Demonreach and she thinks it might explode. He travels to the island and speaks to the spirit of Demonreach, learning that the island is a prison which was created by Merlin himself to contain a massive number of various unspeakable supernatural horrors. Because of his connection to the island, he is now the prison's de facto Warden. The island is under attack, and if the attack is not stopped, the prison's fail-safe will trigger, releasing enough magical energy to destroy the prison as well as level a significant portion of the Midwest.

In trying to figure out how to proceed, Harry consults with many magical powers, including Donar Vadderung, Lily, Titania, the Faerie Mothers, and Rashid. Harry learns that Outsiders are constantly attempting to get past the Outer Gates, which are defended by the Winter Fae. He discovers that Outsiders are behind his present troubles, and that an Outsider infiltrator named Nemesis has been behind many challenges faced by Harry and by the world in general for many years. He also figures out that the ritual that will be used to destroy Demonreach will be performed at the island itself at some point in the near future.

While preparing for the assault against the hundreds of Outsiders attacking Demonreach, Harry is chased and attacked by the Wild Hunt. With Karrin Murphy's assistance, he is able to evade the Hunt temporarily, and after shooting the Erlking, he takes command of the Hunt and leads it against the Outsiders. With the reinforcement of the Hunt, Harry is able to disrupt the ritual and repel the Outsider attack.

Harry and his friends head for the top of the island, where they find Lily and Maeve magically assaulting Demonreach. Harry, having determined that Maeve has been corrupted by the Nemesis, attacks Maeve. She defeats him soundly but he is rescued by his friends. Harry, out of options, summons Mab, who appears and confronts Maeve. Maeve refuses to yield to her mother and shoots and kills Lily, and is then shot and killed by Murphy in turn. The mantles of the Summer and Winter Ladies pass respectively to Sarissa and Molly, and Mab departs with both of them to begin training them in their new duties.

Harry decides to remain on the island for the time being so that he can learn more about it and establish a new base of operations, and takes a branch from its oldest oak tree to use in making a new staff.

== Introduced characters ==
- Sarissa: Dresden's physical therapist and someone indebted to Winter, now the Summer Lady.
- He Who Walks Before: another one of the Walkers akin to He Who Walks Behind. Harry usually refers to the Outsider as Sharkface.
- Cat Sith is a cat-like creature. He is the King of the Malks, and the batman (right-hand vassal) of the Winter Knight.
- Redcap: servant of Maeve and the original Redcap legend.
- Lacuna is a fairy of the little folk. She is as tall as Toot-Toot.

== Reception ==
Critical reception has been mostly positive. Tor.com praised Cold Days and wrote that they viewed it as "one of the best books in the series". Kirkus Reviews gave the work a favorable review but commented that the book would have benefited from "more rigorous copy editing to clean up the continuity errors which continue to riddle the series". CNN and Geeks of Doom also reviewed Cold Days, and Geeks of Doom recommended the book highly.
