= Turn Coat =

2009 novel by Jim Butcher

- Author: Jim Butcher
- Cover artist: Christian McGrath
- Language: English
- Series: The Dresden Files
- Genre: Detective, Contemporary fantasy, Urban fantasy
- Publisher: Roc Hardcover
- Publication date: April 7, 2009
- Publication place: United States
- Media type: Print (hardcover) & AudioBook (Audio CD)
- Pages: 545
- ISBN: 0-451-46256-4
- OCLC: 233548311
- Dewey Decimal: 813/.6 22
- LC Class: PS3602.U85 T87 2009
- Preceded by: Small Favor
- Followed by: Changes

Turn Coat is the 11th book in The Dresden Files, Jim Butcher's continuing series about wizard detective Harry Dresden. It debuted at number one on the New York Times Best Seller list for hardcover fiction.

== Plot summary ==
Nearly a year and a half after the events in Small Favor, a wounded Warden Morgan shows up at Dresden's apartment, asking for protection from the other Wardens. Morgan claims that he was drugged and framed for the murder of Senior Council member LaFortier. While obtaining medical supplies, Dresden spots a naagloshii, a shape-shifting creature from Native American lore. Over the course of investigating Morgan's apparent crime, he legally entangles his apprentice Molly, as well as Anastasia Luccio, after they stumble over Morgan in Dresden's home. Dresden also confronts Madeline Raith of the White Court, whom Dresden comes to suspect is behind framing Morgan, and Binder, a practitioner who works as a mercenary by summoning beings from the Nevernever to serve him.

Dresden invites Luccio to accompany him on a visit to Lara Raith and accuses her of complicity, but is interrupted by the naagloshii who ransoms Thomas Raith for Morgan. Realizing he needs far more strength to combat the naagloshii, Dresden performs a Sanctum Invocation and bonds with the spirit of Demonreach, the island in the finale of Small Favor. Aware that he cannot fight both the naagloshii and Morgan's betrayer alone, Dresden calls the Council, House Raith, and the naagloshii, convincing each that Morgan is on the island or that the island is where they will meet to discuss further strategy. Dresden persuades Binder to quit the fight and is saved from the naagloshii by Listens-to-Wind, while Lara kills and devours Madeline in order to recover from injuries sustained in a grenade explosion. Thomas is rescued but is insane with hunger, and is collected by Lara. Morgan surrenders after the true murderer manages to slip away.

During Morgan's trial in Edinburgh, Dresden produces incontrovertible evidence that Samuel Peabody, a high-ranking clerk within the White Council, has orchestrated LaFortier's murder and has been psychically influencing the Council members through the use of magically adulterated ink. Peabody escapes, slaughtering a large portion of the Council, and opens a Way into the Nevernever. Dresden chases Peabody down, but is overpowered. Morgan kills Peabody and admits to Dresden that it was Luccio who actually killed LaFortier, under the influence of Peabody, and Morgan acted to protect her. He dies of blood loss from the wound he sustained in fleeing from the Wardens, hinting with his last words that he was wrong about Dresden's character.

In the aftermath, Gregori Cristos, suspected by Dresden of being on the Black Council, fills LaFortier's Senior Council seat. During a respite, Luccio approaches Dresden and confirms that her romantic feelings for him were most likely manufactured by Peabody's subtle influences (as Rashid the Gatekeeper had suggested to Dresden while he was recovering in the Council Infirmary), and formally ends the relationship. Dresden learns that Ebenezar is slowly and quietly gathering support from those who secretly believe that a Black Council exists, and that it must be opposed. Dresden labels the new group Ebenezar is forming as the "Grey Council." He stops in to join Will Borden and his friends in one of their role-playing game sessions, introducing Waldo Butters to bring the group back up to full size following the death of one member in the naagloshii attack.

== Introduced characters ==
- Skinwalker: a Naagloshii, a Native American spirit of immense power and ability to change form. This creature has survived a millennium and is semi-divine in nature. It eats magical creatures, including wizards, to increase its own power.
- Vincent Graver: a private detective and former vice officer from Joliet, who resigned after being assigned to the SIU as punishment for trying to prosecute a Chicago city council member. Dresden is impressed with his integrity, and subcontracts detective work to him. By the end of the book, Graver and Molly have a date, and Graver and Mouse together bring in conclusive evidence implicating Samuel Peabody as the traitor within the White Council.
- Binder: Ernest Armand Tinwhistle, a Cockney mercenary who specializes in summoning a large number of creatures from the Nevernever.
- Demonreach: the ancient spirit, genius loci, of the uncharted island in Lake Michigan. Dresden bonded with the spirit during the Sanctum Invocation. Whenever Dresden is physically present on the island, he shares the Demonreach's supernatural knowledge of the island. Demonreach appears as a 12-foot-tall (3.7 m) cloaked and robed figure with no visible features but glowing green eyes. It has a limp from "the glacier that carved out Lake Michigan" The island holds an unknown grudge against the Gatekeeper resulting in the Gatekeeper's unwillingness to step onto the island.
- Madeline Raith: a White Court vampire and cousin of Thomas and Lara. She betrayed the White Court to the Black Council in much the same way as Vitto Malvora did in White Night. Working with Lara's business manager, she creates a money trail from Morgan to one of Lara's holding companies, in order to implicate the White Court in LaFortier's death. She hires Binder to find Morgan before anyone else does, so that Morgan can be blamed for her future activities. Lara ultimately kills both Madeline and the business manager and sends their heads to the White Council.
