= Douglas Hulick =

American fantasy writer

- Born: 1965; Fargo, North Dakota, U.S.
- Education: University of Illinois Urbana-Champaign (BA); New Mexico State University
- Occupation: Writer
- Writing career
- Genre: Fantasy

Douglas Hulick is an American fantasy writer.

Born in Fargo, North Dakota, he obtained a B.A. in history and English at the University of Illinois, and a master's degree in medieval history at New Mexico State University. He subsequently worked odd jobs and turned to writing fantasy fiction after chancing on a dictionary of historical criminal jargon.

His sword and sorcery novel, Among Thieves, was a finalist for the 2011 Kitschies Golden Tentacle award for best debut novel.

== Works ==
- Tales of the Kin series:
1. Among Thieves, Roc Books, 5 April 2011, ISBN 978-0-451-46390-6
2. Sworn in Steel, Roc Books, May 2014, ISBN 978-0-451-46447-7
