= Ghost of the Robot =

Rock band from Los Angeles

- Origin: Los Angeles, California, United States
- Genres: Rock, alternative rock, country
- Years active: 2002–2004, 2010–present
- Labels: Robot Records, EyeLAshout
- Members: James Marsters; Charlie De Mars; Kevin McPherson; Jordan Latham; Sullivan Marsters
- Past members: Steven Sellers; Aaron Anderson; Matt Brown
- Website: gotrmusic.com

Ghost of the Robot (commonly abbreviated GOTR) is an American rock band from Los Angeles, California. The band's current lineup consists of lead vocalist and guitarist James Marsters, guitarist and backing vocalist Sullivan Marsters and Charlie De Mars, bassist Kevin McPherson and drummer Jordan Latham.

== History ==
Ghost of the Robot released its first two albums Mad Brilliant and B-Sider in 2003. The band paused its activity in 2005. Ghost of the Robot reunited in October 2010 at the a club in Santa Monica, where they had played their first show. This was followed by the release of their studio album Murphy's Law (2011), and a European Tour. On their reunion, James Marsters comment that their music "mixes beautifully" as they adapted a format with a less apparent lead vocalist. Sullivan Marsters is the son of James Marsters. He joined the Ghost of the Robot at age 13.

Since 2013, they have played clubs and music festivals in Sacramento, Portland, San Diego, Philadelphia, Chicago, and Atlanta, and concerts that were streamed live from studios in Lake Tahoe and Sacramento, CA. Following Murphy's Law, they released ''Bourgeois Faux Pas'' (2015), ''Pair of Bulls'', Vol. 1 (2018) and "Tin Man" (2023). Ghost of the Robot has released seven albums.

== Catalog availability ==
All of their EPs and singles are released by EyeLAshout on iTunes and Amazon.

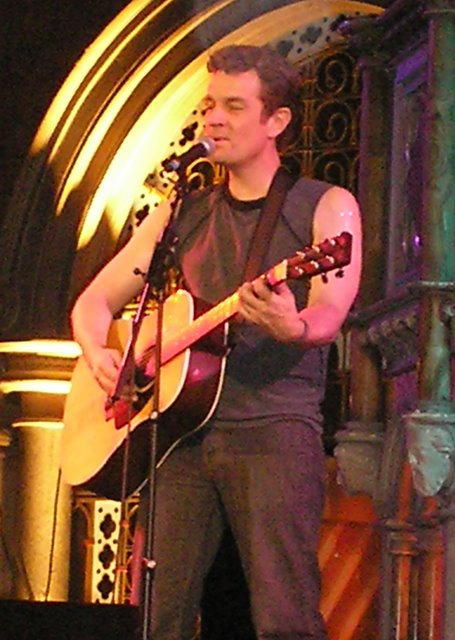
James Marsters performing with Ghost of the Robot

== Performances and media appearances ==
Date	Event	Notes
April 23, 2004	The Sharon Osbourne Show	Performed It's Nothing
July 23, 2016	Harlow's	Performed

== Band members ==
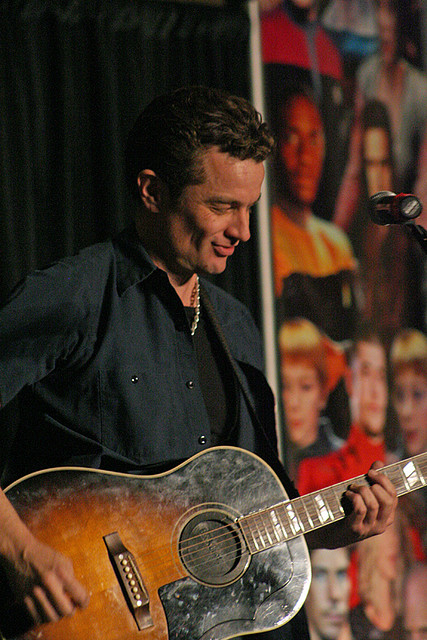
James Marsters in 2007.

=== List of Members ===
Current members:

- Charlie De Mars – guitar and vocals
- James Marsters – guitar and vocals
- Jordan Latham - drums
- Kevin McPherson – bass
- Sullivan Marsters – guitar and vocals
- Eddie Underwood - lead guitar

Past members:

- Steven Sellers – keyboard and backing vocals (died February 21, 2009)
- Aaron Anderson – drums (2003-2004)

== Discography ==
=== Albums ===
Mad Brilliant (2003)

1. "Liar" (Duration: 2:54 minutes)
2. "Vehicles Shock Me" (Duration: 4:42 minutes)
3. "Dangerous" (Duration: 2:54 minutes)
4. "David Letterman" (Duration: 3:28 minutes)
5. "Angel" (Duration: 2:00 minutes)
6. "Valerie" (Single) (Duration: 2:37 minutes)
7. "Mad Brilliant" (Duration: 1:45 minutes)
8. "Call 911" (Duration: 4:34 minutes)
9. "Blocking Brainwaves" (Duration: 3:46 minutes)
10. "German. Jewish." (Duration: 4:00 minutes)
11. "Goodnight Sweet Girl" (Duration: 4:55 minutes)
- B-Sider (2003)
1. "Goodbye" (Duration: 2:05 minutes)
2. "Sounds Like A Personal Problem" (Duration: 3:59 minutes)
3. "Méfiant" (Duration: 6:31 minutes)
4. "New Man" (Duration: 5:22 minutes)
5. "Country Live In" (Duration: 4:19 minutes)
6. "It's Nothing" (EP) (Duration: 3:06 minutes)
7. "Runaway" (Duration: 3:51 minutes)
8. "This Town" (Duration: 3:16 minutes)
9. "Pre-War" (Duration: 3:48 minutes)
10. "The End" (Un-released) (Duration: 4:01 minutes)
- Murphy's Law (2011)
1. "Go Luck Yourself!" (Duration: 2:41 minutes)
2. "One Love, One Exception" (Duration: 3:04 minutes)
3. "Too Fast" (Duration: 2:32 minutes)
4. "Alone Cowboy song" (Duration: 2:23 minutes)
5. "Truth Is" (Duration: 2:50 minutes)
6. "Blind Eyes" (Duration: 2:50 minutes)
7. "Is Shoes" (Duration: 3:15 minutes)
8. "Smile" (Duration: 3:17 minutes)
9. "Moonshot" (Duration: 4:23 minutes)
10. "Strippers" (Duration: 2:41 minutes)
11. "Finer Than Gold" (Duration: 2:50 minutes)
12. "If This Is Love" (Duration: 4:34 minutes)
13. "Transferring Energy" (Duration: 3:53 minutes)
14. "Men Who Die" (Duration: 2:59 minutes)
15. "Figures" (Duration: 4:31 minutes)
16. "The Key" (Duration: 2:57 minutes)
- Bourgeois Faux Pas (2015)
1. "Hello (Album Version)" (Duration: 4:40 minutes)
2. "Back To Act Too" (Duration: 2:10 minutes)
3. "Three" (Duration: 3:12 minutes)
4. "Mother Of Peril" (Duration: 4:16 minutes)
5. "Bad" (Duration: 3:45 minutes)
6. "All That She Wanted" (Duration: 2:46 minutes)
7. "Why Do We Love?" (Duration: 2:59 minutes)
8. "Katie" (Duration: 3:28 minutes)
9. "The Weight" (Duration: 2:59 minutes)
10. "Fall Away" (Duration: 4:10 minutes)
11. "Dark Matter" (Duration: 3:55 minutes)
- Pair of Bulls, Vol. 1 (2018)
1. "Heart Attack" (Duration: 3:25 minutes)
2. "More Than Free" (Duration: 2:51 minutes)
3. "Fall of Night" (Duration: 3:33 minutes)
4. "Epic Harm Us" (Duration: 3:29 minutes)
5. "Alone" (Duration: 2:39 minutes)
6. "Light + Sound" (Duration: 2:06 minutes)
7. "Vandals" (Duration: 2:49 minutes)
8. "Dance Slow" (Duration: 1:55 minutes)
9. "Man 1" (Duration: 3:19 minutes)
10. "Jaded" (Duration: 3:08 minutes)
11. "Musica Universalis" (Duration: 3:15 minutes)
- Tin Man (2023)
1. "Civilized Man"
2. "Don't Worry Son"
3. "Looking At You"
4. "San Francisco"
5. "Steady Hand"
6. "Over Now"
7. "Louise"
8. "Home Alone"
9. "Under You"
10. "40 Days"
11. "White Hot Girls"
12. "Up On Me"

=== EPs and singles ===
- It's Nothing EP (2004)
1. "It's Nothing"
2. "Runaway"
3. "Pre-War"
4. "This Town"
5. "She Likes Rap Grooves" (Featuring Ice Berg, Rockmaninoff and Sir-Rock)
- David Letterman (2003)
1. "David Letterman"
2. "Sounds Like a Personal Problem"
3. "Mefiant"
- Valerie (2003)
1. "Valerie"
2. "Goodbye"
- Hello (Single) (2014)

== Sources ==
- Retrieved August 3, 2011
- https://web.archive.org/web/20110830053424/http://sunnydale-la.webs.com/jamesmarsters-fanpage/gotr/ Retrieved May 11, 2011
- http://www.sing365.com/music/lyric.nsf/Ghost-Of-The-Robot-Biography/FC43E3CFC5D7E61C48256D450013E87D Retrieved May 11, 2011
- Retrieved December 28, 2011
- Mad Brilliant de Ghost of the Robot en Apple Music. (1970, January 1). Retrieved March 23, 2017, from
- Ghost of the Robot | Official Website. (2012). Official Website | Discography. Retrieved March 23, 2017, from
- Bourgeois Faux Pas by Ghost of the Robot on Apple Music. (2015, September 19). Retrieved March 23, 2017, from
- B-Sider by Ghost of the Robot on Apple Music. (1970, January 1). Retrieved March 23, 2017, from
