= Peace Talks (novel) =

2020 novel by Jim Butcher

- Author: Jim Butcher
- Cover artist: Christian McGrath
- Language: English
- Series: The Dresden Files
- Genre: Detective, Contemporary fantasy, Urban fantasy
- Published: Ace Books
- Publication date: July 14, 2020
- Publication place: United States
- Media type: Hardcover
- Pages: 340
- ISBN: 978-0-451-46441-5
- Dewey Decimal: 813/.6
- LC Class: PS3602.U85 P43 2020
- Preceded by: Skin Game
- Followed by: Battle Ground

Peace Talks is a novel in The Dresden Files series by Jim Butcher. It is the 16th novel in the series. It follows the protagonist, Harry Dresden as he attempts to navigate a convoluted peace negotiation between various supernatural powers.

== Plot ==
Harry Dresden, now torn between his White Council wizard duties, his obligatory Winter Knight duties, and being a father to his daughter Maggie, is contacted by the Winter Queen Mab to serve as emissary for Winter at upcoming peace negotiations between the Fomor and the various other signatories of the Accords. Even as he does, he discovers that forces in the mortal world are moving against him and Karrin Murphy, the White Council may be meeting to expel him, something in collusion with Outsiders is trying to kill him, and his grandfather, Ebenezar McCoy, wants to take Maggie away from him to someplace safe until she can grow into her magic.

Harry's half-brother, Thomas Raith, whose lover Justine is now pregnant with his child, attacks the King of the Svartalfar at the cusp of the negotiations, fails, and is imprisoned. Lara Raith uses favors from Mab to force Harry into springing him, and they do so right during the middle of the peace talks for the Fomor to join the Accords.

Arriving just as Harry and Lara are escaping, King Corb of the Fomor declares open war on the surface and humanity, and introduces the last Titan, Ethniu, who is in possession of the Eye of Balor and effortlessly humiliates Mab and intimidates almost all other present parties. Corb declares that in a few hours, the Fomor will rise from Lake Michigan and sack Chicago. The Accorded representatives realize this would almost certainly mean a genocidal war against the supernatural and result in their extinction while the Fomor are safe in their underwater cities.

Harry flees to Demonreach with Thomas, who is dying from his Hunger. He has to outwit his grandfather McCoy; after a fierce duel, Harry finally reveals that Thomas is his half-brother, much to the older wizard's utter disgust and rage. Harry escapes and traps Thomas in a Warden crystal, imprisoning him in Demonreach, to keep him alive.

Lara attacks Harry in a rage, thinking he has effectively trapped Thomas as a future pawn. Harry easily overpowers her with the aid of the island's spirit, and the two agree to an uneasy truce to face the greater threat, not having the resources to save Thomas on hand anyway.

== Reception ==
Publishers Weekly wrote that it seems like the book is a prologue to the next book in the series, and had a lot of background information that serves new readers well, but may be tedious for fans. Other publications reviewed the novel positively.
