= Summer Knight =

2002 fantasy novel by Jim Butcher

- Author: Jim Butcher
- Cover artist: Lee MacLeod
- Language: English
- Series: The Dresden Files
- Genre: Detective, Contemporary fantasy, Urban fantasy
- Publisher: Penguin Putnam
- Publication date: September 3, 2002
- Publication place: United States
- Media type: Print (Paperback) & AudioBook (Audio cassette & Audio CD) (future hardcover)
- Pages: 371 pp (first edition, paperback)
- ISBN: 0-451-45892-3 (first edition, paperback) (future hardcover 0-4514-6275-0)
- OCLC: 50488823
- LC Class: CPB Box no. 2028 vol. 14
- Preceded by: Grave Peril
- Followed by: Death Masks

Summer Knight is a 2002 New York Times Bestselling contemporary fantasy novel by author Jim Butcher. It is the fourth novel in The Dresden Files, which follows the character of Harry Dresden, present-day Chicago's only professional wizard.

== Plot summary ==
Mab, the Winter Queen of the Sidhe, has purchased Dresden's debt from his fairy godmother, Leanansidhe. She tells Dresden he can pay off his debt by doing three favors. The first favor is for him to find the murderer of the Summer Knight Ronald Reuel and recover his stolen mantle. Dresden refuses her request, but is forced by the White Council to accept the role of her Emissary as his Trial, else be stripped of his title of wizard and handed over to the Red Court vampires as a peace offering.

Dresden is visited by Elaine, his former lover, now the Emissary of the Summer Court, indebted to Aurora, the Summer Lady. Dresden goes to Reuel's funeral, looking for a group of teenage half-human/half-Fae changelings who were Reuel's friends, but they flee and attack, believing him to be in service to Winter. An interview with the sadistic Winter Lady, Maeve, convinces him that she did not kill the Summer Knight.

The changelings ask Dresden to find their friend Lily, and he agrees. He discovers a gravely wounded Elaine and takes her to the Summer Lady. Aurora heals Elaine, but is not forthcoming with any details on Reuel's murder or Lily's disappearance. She explains that the death of the Summer Knight and the theft of his mantle of power shifted the power balance in favor of Winter, driving the Summer Court to attack Winter at Midsummer before their power fades.

Dresden summons Leanansidhe, who transports him to an ethereal Chicago-over-Chicago, where a great Stone Table stands to represent the balance of power between the Winter and Summer Sidhe. Any blood spilled upon the table will permanently change that balance. Dresden persuades Elaine to help him reach the Mothers, the elder Queens of Summer and Winter. They goad him into answering his own questions, realizing that Aurora killed the Summer Knight and transferred his mantle to Lily, who she then turned to stone. They give him a Cloth of Unraveling to release Lily.

Aurora ambushes Dresden and takes him prisoner, aided by Elaine and by the Winter Knight, who she has suborned. Aurora intends to ritually sacrifice Lily on the Stone Table, transferring the power of the mantle to the Winter Sidhe and breaking the unending cycle of struggle between the Faerie Courts. Elaine covertly betrays Aurora, leaving Dresden an escape route from Aurora's sorcerous deathtrap. During the battle between the Courts, Dresden confronts Aurora and releases a swarm of pixies who kill her with steel-bladed box cutters.

Mab offers Dresden the mantle of the Winter Knight, which he declines. Queen Mab grants safe passage to the White Council of the wizards, enabling Dresden to pass his Trial. Lily becomes the new Summer Lady and her changeling friend Fix her new Summer Knight.

== Introduced characters ==
- Queen Mab: the Queen of Air and Darkness; the monarch of the Court of the Winter Sidhe, the Unseelie Faeries.
- Queen Titania: the monarch of the Court of the Summer Sidhe, the Seelie Faeries.
- Maeve: the Winter Lady of the Sidhe.
- Aurora: the Summer Lady of the Sidhe.
- Mothers Summer and Winter: two former queens of the Summer and Winter Sidhe, respectively.
- Lloyd Slate: the Winter Knight.
- The Merlin: the head of both the White Council and the Senior Council within it.
- Ebenezar McCoy: Dresden's mentor, who becomes a member of the Senior Council.
- Rashid, the Gatekeeper: a member of the Senior Council and Mab's "old desert fox".
- Aleron LaFortier: a member of the Senior Council.
- Listens-to-Wind: a member of the Senior Council.
- Martha Liberty: a member of the Senior Council.
- Ancient Mai: a member of the Senior Council.
- Samuel Peabody: a member of the White Council, who acts as its secretary.
- Elaine Mallory: Dresden's childhood girlfriend and the emissary of the Summer Sidhe.
- Lily: a statuesque Changeling, who becomes the new Summer Lady.
- Fix: a mechanic and a Changeling, who becomes the new Summer Knight.

== Reception ==
Critical reception has been positive. The SF Site and Tor.com both reviewed Summer Knight, with Victoria Strauss commenting via the SF Site that it was "another superior entry in this excellent series".
