= White Night (Butcher novel) =

2007 fantasy novel by Jim Butcher

- Author: Jim Butcher
- Cover artist: Christian McGrath
- Language: English
- Series: The Dresden Files
- Genre: Detective, Contemporary fantasy, Urban fantasy
- Publisher: Roc Hardcover
- Publication date: April 3, 2007
- Publication place: United States
- Media type: Print (hardcover)
- Pages: 416
- ISBN: 0-451-46155-X
- OCLC: 176919800
- Preceded by: Proven Guilty
- Followed by: Small Favor

White Night is the 9th book in The Dresden Files, Jim Butcher's continuing series about wizard detective Harry Blackstone Copperfield Dresden.

The cover art by illustrator Christian McGrath depicts Harry walking down a snowy street with his glowing staff.

== Plot summary ==
A year after the events in Proven Guilty, Dresden is called by Murphy to the scene of an apparent suicide, and senses the victim is a magical practitioner. After investigating another victim, Dresden realizes a serial killer of magical practitioners is loose in Chicago. Investigating, he meets with a group of practitioners who've banded together and hired Elaine, Harry's former lover, for protection. He finds that his brother, Thomas, had apparently been following most of the women who've vanished, but also comes across another suspect, "Grey Cloak", whom he tracks to Undertown, a warren under Chicago, and spies on him meeting with Cowl, who didn't die during the Darkhallow (in Dead Beat), also learning that vampires of House Skavis—who feed on despair—are responsible for the suicides. Cowl detects Dresden and blasts his psychic thread. Dresden wakes up next to his melted model of Chicago, which absorbed most of the blast.

After incorrectly singling out a practitioner, Helen Beckitt, as an accomplice, Harry tracks Thomas to his boat, where they learn that Thomas has been smuggling magically talented women out of the city to protect them. Before Thomas can finish explaining, Madrigal Raith and his ghouls attack, and the group flees. Following more deaths and investigation, Harry figures out the Skavis is one of the women in time to save Elaine from its attack. Elaine is hospitalized, so Dresden calls Carlos Ramirez to help him fight Grey Cloak and Madrigal.

Dresden, Ramirez, Molly and Mouse head to the Raith estate for the White Court conclave. Lara Raith escorts Dresden and Ramirez into the Deeps, a cavern, where they wait until the right moment to challenge Vittorio "Grey Cloak" Malvora and Madrigal to combat for violation of the Unseelie Accords. Vittorio and Madrigal accept the duel to the death. They all fight with a combination of physical and magical weaponry and defenses. Dresden kills Madrigal. Vittorio calls Cowl, who opens a gate from Nevernever, ushering in an army of ghouls. While the ghouls rampage, Dresden opens another gate. Thomas, Murphy, Marcone, and his mercenaries arrive with automatic weapons and high explosives. They escort Lord Raith, Lara, and their entourage to Dresden's gate. Vittorio casts a spell that crushes Dresden, Lara, Thomas, and Marcone to the floor. Inside a time warp bubble, Dresden and Lash, the demonic shadow possessing Dresden, discuss free will and Lasciel's coin. Dresden refuses to accept the coin to defeat the vampires. Tortured by self-awareness, Lash sacrifices herself to protect Dresden's mind from Vittorio's spell. Suddenly free, Dresden blasts Vittorio with Marcone's shotgun, breaking the spell on the others. As Thomas hauls Marcone through the gate, Cowl closes it, stranding Lara and Dresden. Marcone's explosives go off and the cavern collapses. Dresden folds his shield into a bubble around Lara and himself. They ride the explosion of fire out of the tunnel to safety.

Dresden finds out Lara was behind the plot to kill the female practitioners, and extracts a restitution and bond against future killings. Discussing the future with Elaine, he encourages her plan to develop and spread a safety net for practitioners. In exchange for his help, Marcone becomes a freeholding baron under the Unseelie Accords. Discovering that the scar of Lasciel's sigil has faded from his palm, Dresden digs up her coin and turns it over to Father Forthill. He learns that Thomas is now working as a hairstylist and safely feeding on the emotions of his female customers, and that Justine is secretly passing him information about the war from within House Raith.

== Introduced characters ==
- Anna Ash: head of the Ordo Lebes, an organization of minor female practitioners.
- Priscilla: member of the Ordo Lebes and a disguised Skavis (White Court vampire who feeds on despair).
- Vittorio Malvora: White Court vampire working with Madrigal Raith.
