= The Dresden Files =

Fantasy/mystery book series by Jim Butcher

- Author: Jim Butcher
- Cover artist: Lee MacLeod, Christian McGrath
- Language: English
- Genre: Detective; Contemporary fantasy Urban fantasy
- Publisher: Roc Books; Ace Books; Dabel Brothers (comics and graphic novels 2007–2009); Dynamite Entertainment (comics and graphic novels 2009–present)
- Publication date: April 2000 – present
- Media type: Print (hardback & paperback); Serial (comics and graphic novels); Audiobook (CD & MP3)

The Dresden Files is an urban fantasy series written by American author Jim Butcher. The novels are narrated from the first-person perspective of Harry Dresden, a private detective and wizard, as he investigates supernatural disturbances in contemporary Chicago. The first entry, Storm Front, was published in 2000 by Roc Books.

The series is planned to include 25 volumes. As of January 2026, Butcher has published 18 novels set in the Dresden Files universe, as well as dozens of short stories, with audio adaptations performed by James Marsters. Other works set in the same fictional universe include graphic novels and The Dresden Files Roleplaying Game. In 2007, a television series based on the novels aired for one season on the American Sci-Fi Channel.

== Setting ==
The series takes place in a world where magic and the paranormal—including vampires, demons, spirits, faeries, werewolves, outsiders and other monsters—are real but widely discredited. Harry Dresden is based primarily in the city of Chicago and outlying suburbs. It also expands to large portions of the globe, including much of Central and South America, which are controlled by supernatural factions. These factions are loosely countered by the White Council, an organization of human wizards that wields significant economic power.

Each species has its own political and societal rules and organizations, acting to counter each other and maintain the masquerade. The human wizards depend on the White Council, while faeries either belong to one of two Faerie Courts or are unaffiliated, known as Wyldfae. Vampires generally belong to any of the four vampire courts. The series features other non-human creatures from a range of mythologies.

== Plot summary ==
Harry Dresden is the only advertising wizard in the United States, living in Chicago and taking supernatural cases on behalf of both human and nonhuman clients. He serves as a consultant for the Special Investigations division of the Chicago Police Department, reviewing cases that appear to have a magical element.

As the series progresses, Dresden takes on an increasingly important role in the supernatural world at large. As he works to protect the general public, he struggles to get by as a working wizard and private investigator.

=== Main characters ===
- Harry Blackstone Copperfield Dresden is a self-employed supernatural private investigator and consultant for the Chicago Police Department.
- Bob is a "spirit of intellect" who inhabits a skull most often perched on a shelf in Dresden's secret lab. He is bound to the skull and its owner's commands. He is free to leave the skull if given permission by his owner, but he will die if exposed to significant sunlight without a host body. His usual vessel is Harry's cat, Mister, who does not seem to mind Bob's presence.
- Karrin Murphy is an officer with the Chicago Police Department who leads the Special Investigations (SI) division, handling cases in which something unexplainable or supernatural is involved. As the series progresses, she is demoted from lieutenant to sergeant and stripped of her command, then later dismissed from the force altogether.
- Michael Joseph Patrick Carpenter is a carpenter and contractor, as well as a devout Christian, who also served as a Knight of the Cross wielding the holy sword Amoracchius. Carpenter is often recruited by Dresden to fight alongside him and later in the series takes in Dresden's daughter.

== Background ==
As a writing student, Butcher wrote several novels that he has since described as "terrible", the majority being traditional high fantasy. At the suggestion of his writing teacher, author Deborah Chester, he attempted a novel in the style of the Anita Blake: Vampire Hunter series by Laurell K. Hamilton and Buffy the Vampire Slayer, media they had discussed because Butcher was a fan. Resistant to her systematic approach to writing fiction, he set out to prove her wrong by closely following her methods. The result, which would require little editing, was Storm Front. Butcher has called the experience, "a valuable lesson about humility."

When I finally got tired of arguing with her and decided to write a novel as if I [were] some kind of formulaic, genre-writing drone, just to prove to her how awful it would be, I wrote the first book of the Dresden Files.

— Jim Butcher in "A Conversation with Jim Butcher", 2004

Butcher next sought an agent or editor, a process that took over two years. During this period he completed the second novel, Fool Moon, and made significant progress on the third, Grave Peril. Deciding to focus on agents who had sold similar novels, Butcher submitted a copy of his manuscript to the literary agency of Ricia Mainhardt, who represented Laurell Hamilton. It was rejected.

His break came when Butcher met Hamilton at a convention and was invited to a lunch including Mainhardt. Mainhardt agreed to represent him, and six months later, the first three books of The Dresden Files were sold to ROC.

The first volume, Storm Front, was released on April 1, 2000 in paperback; the next two novels in the series, Fool Moon and Grave Peril, were published in January and September 2001, respectively. Subsequent novels were released annually until Peace Talks, published in July 2020 after a six-year hiatus, scheduled to coincide with the 20th anniversary of Storm Front.

Butcher is currently planning for twenty-two books in the "case files" of the series, to be capped by a final "double-length apocalyptic trilogy".

== Publication history ==
In 2007, ROC began publishing hardcover reprints of books one through six. Volumes 7-15 (Dead Beat through Skin Game) were published first as hardcover, then released in paperback several months later.

Orbit Books purchased the series for UK publication and released the first novel, Storm Front, in September 2005, five years after the initial US release. They continued to publish two books per month. In November 2007, Orbit bought the rights to Changes and Ghost Story, the 12th and 13th novels.

In the USA, the series moved to Ace Books starting with Peace Talks (book 16).

All volumes of The Dresden Files, along with the companion short-story anthologies Side Jobs and Brief Cases, have been released as audiobooks. The first four novels were produced by Buzzy Multimedia Publishing, while later audiobooks were produced by Penguin Audio. All except Ghost Story were originally narrated by James Marsters. In a release on his website on June 27, 2011, Butcher reported that Marsters would be unable to voice Ghost Story, "due to scheduling conflicts"; instead, the narration was performed by John Glover. James Marsters returned to read the Cold Days audiobook. In April 2015, a rerecorded version of "Ghost Story" by Marsters was released.

The Science Fiction Book Club has released omnibus editions, with each of the four volumes reprinting two or three of the novels in the sequence.

GraphicAudio is adapting the series as dramatized audio editions, beginning with Storm Front in August 2025.

=== Bibliography ===
Dresden Files bibliography
No.	Title	Paperback release date	Paperback ISBN	Hardcover release date	Hardcover ISBN	Audio release date	Audio CD ISBN	MP3 CD ISBN	Audio length
1	Storm Front	April 1, 2000	0-4514-5781-1	November 6, 2007	0-4514-6197-5	July 2002	0-9657-2550-2	978-1-4805-8050-3	8h 1m
2	Fool Moon	January 1, 2001	0-4514-5812-5	July 1, 2008	0-4514-6202-5	April 30, 2003	0-9657-2552-9	978-1-4805-9690-0	10h 6m
3	Grave Peril	September 1, 2001	0-4514-5844-3	November 4, 2008	0-4514-6234-3	July 30, 2005	0-9657-2555-3	978-1-4805-8133-3	11h 59m
4	Summer Knight	September 3, 2002	0-4514-5892-3	July 7, 2009	0-4514-6275-0	March 31, 2007	0-9790-7492-4	978-1-4805-9692-4	11h 12m
5	Death Masks	August 5, 2003	0-4514-5940-7	November 3, 2009	0-4514-6294-7	October 29, 2009	0-1431-4519-3	978-1-4498-2379-5	11h 21m
6	Blood Rites	August 2, 2004	0-4514-5987-3	July 5, 2010	0-4514-6335-8	April 15, 2010	0-1424-2806-X	978-1-4498-2421-1	13h 11m
7	Dead Beat	May 2, 2006	0-4514-6091-X	May 3, 2005	0-4514-6027-8	April 15, 2010	0-1424-2807-8	978-1-4498-2418-1	15h 14m
8	Proven Guilty	February 6, 2007	0-4514-6103-7	May 2, 2006	0-4514-6085-5	April 30, 2009	0-1431-4473-1	978-1-4498-2415-0	16h 16m
9	White Night	February 5, 2008	0-4514-6155-X	April 3, 2007	0-4514-614-01	April 30, 2009	0-1431-4474-X	978-1-4906-4494-3	14h 13m
10	Small Favor	May 3, 2009	0-4514-6200-9	April 1, 2008	0-4514-6189-4	April 1, 2008	1-4362-1140-9	978-0-1431-4339-0	13h 50m
11	Turn Coat	March 3, 2010	0-4514-6281-5	April 7, 2009	0-4514-6256-4	April 30, 2009	0-1431-4472-3	978-1-4498-2409-9	14h 40m
12	Changes	March 11, 2011	0-4514-6347-1	April 6, 2010	0-4514-6317-X	April 15, 2010	0-1431-4534-7	978-1-1011-5486-1	15h 28m
13	Ghost Story	August 7, 2012	0-4514-6407-9	July 26, 2011	0-4514-6379-X	August 4, 2011	1-6646-3559-9	978-1-4618-0562-5	17h 52m
14	Cold Days	September 3, 2013	0-4514-1912-X	November 27, 2012	0-4514-6440-0	December 27, 2012	1-6646-2088-5	978-1-1016-1703-8	18h 50m
15	Skin Game	March 5, 2015	0-3565-0096-9	May 27, 2014	0-4514-6439-7	May 29, 2014	1-4906-3041-4	978-1-4906-3041-0	15h 49m
16	Peace Talks	July 14, 2020	0-3565-1529-X	July 14, 2020	0-4514-6441-9	July 14, 2020	1-6117-6294-4	978-0-5932-9071-2	12h 52m
17	Battle Ground	September 29, 2020	0-3565-1570-2	September 29, 2020	0-5931-9930-8	September 29, 2020			15h 43m
18	Twelve Months			January 20, 2026	0-5931-9933-2	January 20, 2026			16h 59m
19	Mirror Mirror			TBD					

Dresden Files omnibus bibliography
No.	Title	Release Date	Book ISBN	Audio CD ISBN	Contents
1–3	Wizard for Hire	March 2005	0-7394-5193-6	—	Storm Front, Fool Moon & Grave Peril
4 & 5	Wizard by Trade	March 2006	0-7394-6581-3	—	Summer Knight & Death Masks
6 & 7	Wizard at Large	October 2006	0-7394-7658-0	—	Blood Rites & Dead Beat
8 & 9	Wizard Under Fire	May 2007	0-7394-8344-7	—	Proven Guilty & White Night
—	Side Jobs	October 26, 2010	0-4514-6365-X	0-1424-2826-4	Eleven short stories
—	Brief Cases	June 5, 2018	0-4514-9210-2	978-1-4362-1140-6	Twelve short stories

== Other media ==
=== Television ===
A television adaptation of the series premiered January 21, 2007 on the Sci Fi Channel. The series was canceled in August 2007; fans campaigned to save the show but were unsuccessful.

In October 2018, Fox21 optioned the Dresden Files for a new TV series.

=== Graphic novels ===
Dabel Brothers Productions began releasing a Dresden Files graphic novel series in 2008; a hardcover compilation was released in October that year. The initial four-issue miniseries, called Welcome to the Jungle, is a prequel to Storm Front. The series was nominated for the inaugural Hugo Award for Best Graphic Story in 2009.

Storm Front was announced as the next adaptation in July 2008. The first issue was released in November; however, midway through the production, the title changed hands from Dabel Brothers to Dynamite Entertainment, resulting in a gap between issues #5 and #6. Artist Ardian Syaf left to work for DC Comics, and Brett Booth was brought in to finish the project.

In 2017, the Dresden Files miniseries Wild Card won the Dragon Award for Best Graphic Novel, and Dog Men won the Dragon Award for Best Comic Book.

No.	Title	Release date	Notes
1	Welcome to the Jungle	October 2008	Illustrated by Ardian Syaf. Published by the Dabel Brothers. Includes 12 pages of concept art. Prequel to Storm Front.
2	Storm Front, Volume 1: The Gathering Storm	June 2009	Illustrated by Ardian Syaf. Published by the Dabel Brothers. Includes Restoration of Faith an eight-page comic from the Showcase 2009 Free Comic Book Day, originally published as a short story on Jim-Butcher.com.
3	Storm Front, Volume 2: Maelstrom	February 2011	Illustrated by Ardian Syaf and Brett Booth. Published by Dynamite Entertainment. Includes preview of "Fool Moon" and concept art.
4	Fool Moon, Volume 1	November 2011	Illustrated by Chase Conley. Published by Dynamite Entertainment.
5	Fool Moon, Volume 2	April 2012	Illustrated by Chase Conley. Published by Dynamite Entertainment.
6	Ghoul, Goblin	March 2013	Illustrated by Joseph Cooper. Published by Dynamite Entertainment. Set between Fool Moon and Grave Peril.
7	War Cry	June 2014	Illustrated by Carlos Gomez. Published by Dynamite Entertainment. Set after the events of Dead Beat.
8	Down Town	February 2015	Illustrated by Carlos Gomez. Published by Dynamite Entertainment. Set after the events of White Night and just before the short story "It's My Birthday, Too".
9	Wild Card	April 2016	Illustrated by Carlos Gomez. Published by Dynamite Entertainment. Set after Downtown and before Small Favor.
10	Dog Men	February 2018	Illustrated by Diego Galindo. Published by Dynamite Entertainment. Set between Small Favor and Turn Coat.
11	Bigfoot	March 2022	Illustrated by Joseph Cooper. Published by Dynamite Entertainment. Adaptation of Working for Bigfoot.

Collections
No.	Title	Release date	Collects
1	Jim Butcher's Dresden Files Graphic Novel Omnibus, Vol. 1	July 2015	Welcome to the Jungle; Storm Front; Fool Moon; Restoration of Faith
2	Jim Butcher's Dresden Files Graphic Novel Omnibus, Vol. 2	October 2017	Ghoul, Goblin; War Cry; Down Town

=== Role-playing game ===
Evil Hat Productions released a licensed role-playing game based on the series in 2010. The RPG consists of three books: Volume One: Your Story, the core rule book; Volume Two: Our World, a text describing the game universe; and Volume Three: Paranet Papers, expanding both the rules and the game universe.

In 2017, Evil Hat released Dresden Files Accelerated, a new standalone providing a lighter version of the game.

=== Tabletop game ===
In June 2017—after a successful Kickstarter campaign where they raised $549,486 from an initial goal of $48,000—Evil Hat Productions released a card game for 1–5 players, titled "The Dresden Files Cooperative Card Game". The game was designed by Eric B. Vogel and features original artwork by Fred Hicks, Chris McGrath, and Tyler Walpole.

The core game includes Harry, Murphy, Susan, Michael, and the Alphas, and plays through the first five novels as well as Side Jobs, a random scenario generator based on the short story collection of the same name. Three expansions were released alongside the base game in 2017, and two more released the following year.

The game was well received, with a rating of 7.2 out of 10 on Board Game Geek's site.

== Reception ==
Bookriot recognized the cultural impact of The Dresden Files, noting that the series is "a lot of people’s doorway into the world of urban fantasy."

Skin Game, the 15th installment in the series, was included in both fantasy writer Brad Torgersen's "Sad Puppies" and science fiction and fantasy author Theodore Beale's "Rabid Puppies" slates, as part of a right-wing, anti-diversity campaign to influence voting for the Hugo Awards; The nomination effort was successful; however, the book placed fifth in the final tally of votes, behind "No Award".
