= Small Favor =

2008 book by Jim Butcher

- Author: Jim Butcher
- Cover artist: Christian McGrath
- Language: English
- Series: The Dresden Files
- Genre: Detective, Contemporary fantasy, Urban fantasy
- Publisher: Roc Hardcover
- Publication date: April 1, 2008
- Publication place: United States
- Pages: 432
- ISBN: 978-0-451-46200-8
- OCLC: 174138906
- Preceded by: White Night
- Followed by: Turn Coat

Small Favor is the tenth book in The Dresden Files, Jim Butcher's continuing series about wizard detective Harry Blackstone Copperfield Dresden. The book stayed on the New York Times Best Seller list for 3 weeks following its release, attaining the number 2 spot during its first week. Small Favor is available as an eBook and an audio CD (ISBN 0-14-314339-5).

The cover art by illustrator Christian McGrath depicts Harry standing in front of a brick wall, with his wizard's staff in one hand and a revolver in the other, as flames rise around him.

== Plot summary ==
One year after the events in White Night, Dresden is attacked by a squad of gruffs - goat-like soldiers who serve the Summer Court - and called by Sgt. Karrin Murphy to the scene of a destroyed building that had belonged to John Marcone. Winter Queen Mab confronts Dresden and calls in one of the two favors he still owes her, ordering him to locate Marcone. After avoiding a second gruff attack, he tracks down Hendricks and Ms. Gard at one of Marcone's safehouses; they are attacked by a group of Denarians, and Dresden realizes that they have abducted Marcone. Gard formally requests that the White Council file an objection to the abduction of one signatory of the Unseelie Accords by another. Anastasia Luccio, captain of the Wardens, agrees to bring in the Archive (a young girl nicknamed "Ivy" by Dresden) as a neutral arbitrator.

Dresden meets Murphy at McAnally's. After he updates her, a huge gruff enters to challenge Dresden to a duel, but relents when Murphy invokes her duties as a law officer. While Thomas is distracting the gruffs, Dresden persuades Gard to let him use her collection of hair/blood samples in finding Marcone. Dresden and Michael Carpenter travel to Union Station to retrieve the samples, but must fend off minions of Winter and an even larger gruff. After suffering severe injuries, the gruff promises that his eldest brother will kill Dresden before returning to the Nevernever. Once Ivy and her bodyguard Kincaid arrive, the group retreats to Dresden's apartment in order to formulate a strategy for dealing with the Denarians.

The Archive schedules a meeting between Dresden and Nicodemus at the Shedd Aquarium. During the negotiations, Dresden realizes it is a charade to kidnap the Archive. A fight breaks out, during which many Denarians are killed and the survivors capture Ivy. Nicodemus plans to torture her until she accepts membership is his order, making her an unstoppable ally in his evil plots. Dresden strikes a deal with Nicodemus to trade Ivy's safe return for all the coins taken from the dead Denarians and Fidelacchius, the sword carried by Shiro as a Knight of the Cross. Michael asks Dresden where his blasting rod has gone. Dresden realizes he lost it shortly after the first gruff attack, as well as all his memories of using fire magic, and concludes that he has been mentally manipulated.

At the exchange site, a remote island in Lake Michigan, the Denarians attempt to double-cross Dresden. He and Sanya free Ivy, and also find Marcone imprisoned nearby and free him as well. Gard arrives with a rescue helicopter, but the surviving Denarians wound Michael with gunfire as he is being hauled in. Now alone on the island, Dresden eludes the Denarians and their mercenaries but is cornered by the Eldest Gruff, who saves his life. The Eldest Gruff explains that he is compelled to attack Dresden as long as the two are on the island. Dresden invokes the boon granted to him by the Summer Court to request a fresh doughnut; the Eldest Gruff remarks that getting one will take enough time for Dresden to leave the island and return to Chicago, whereupon the gruffs will stop pursuing him.

Dresden attempts to escape by boat, but is attacked by Nicodemus and his daughter Deirdre. He barely manages to drive them off after Thomas and Murphy return with another boat and Murphy draws Fidelacchius. They return to the mainland, and Dresden rushes to the hospital to find Michael, still in surgery. In the hospital chapel, Dresden has a heated discussion with a janitor, who explains that God has a plan for everyone and vanishes, leaving behind a worn copy of The Two Towers with a marked section. Queen Mab appears in the chapel. She is pleased that the Watchman (a title belonging to the angel Uriel) has enhanced Dresden's potential. She returns his blasting rod, restores his memories, and explains that she took both to prevent the gruffs from killing him before he could complete his task.

Dresden visits Ivy and Kincaid at Murphy's house. Later, Sanya gives Michael's sword, Amoracchius, to Dresden with the instructions to pass it on, when the time is right. Michael survives the surgery, but his long-term prospects for recovery are uncertain. Dresden suspects that Helen Beckitt, now "Madam Demeter," betrayed Marcone to the Denarians and warns her against trying such an obvious ploy again if she wants to keep Marcone from targeting her. The day ends with Dresden and Luccio having dinner and enjoying an evening together.

== Introduced characters ==
- Akariel: one of the Fallen, defeated by Harry and Thomas.
- Gruffs: servants of Summer and the origin of the Three Billy Goats Gruff story, complete with a reputation for killing trolls, with the heads, fur, and legs of goats but the torso and arms of a man. They increase in size, much as the storybook version, until the Eldest Gruff, a small being of massive magical power.
- Hobs: servants of Winter, harmed by light, able to call Myrk, a magical light-blocking effect.
- Magog: one of the Fallen. Sanya had dropped the coin into a Venetian canal, but he obtained a new host. Nameless host is killed by the Eldest Gruff; Harry safely recovered his coin. Magog is the physically strongest of the Fallen and Tessa's thug.
- McKullen: one of the Denarians.
- Ordiel: one of the Fallen.
- Rosanna: Tessa's second and one of the Fallen. She is also Sanya's former Patron among the Denarians.
- Tarsiel: one of the Fallen.
- Tessa Imariel: known also as Polonius Lartessa, she is the second oldest of the Fallen, wife of Nicodemus and a sorceress. Harry calls her Mantis Girl.
- Thorned Namshiel: Fallen, responsible for the attack on Arctis Tor; Harry called him Spinyboy. He is the most magically knowledgeable of the Fallen. His coin was missing at the end of the book.
- Uriel: an Archangel, Mab refers to him as the Watchman. He has taken an interest in Harry.
- Urumviel: one of the Fallen.
- Varthiel: one of the Fallen.
- Chandler: A British wizard and Warden of the White Council. Harry later nicknames him "Steed" due to his demeanor and style of dress reminding Harry of the character John Steed in The Avengers.
