= Grave Peril =

2001 novel by Jim Butcher

- Author: Jim Butcher
- Cover artist: Lee MacLeod
- Language: English
- Series: The Dresden Files
- Genre: Detective, Contemporary fantasy, Urban fantasy
- Publisher: Penguin Putnam
- Publication date: September 1, 2001
- Publication place: United States
- Media type: Print (paperback) & AudioBook (Audio cassette & Audio CD)
- Pages: 378 pp (first edition, paperback)
- ISBN: 0-451-45844-3 (first edition, paperback)
- OCLC: 47904041
- LC Class: CPB Box no. 1840 vol. 10
- Preceded by: Fool Moon
- Followed by: Summer Knight

Grave Peril is a 2001 urban fantasy novel by author Jim Butcher. It is the third novel in The Dresden Files, which follows the character of Harry Dresden, present-day Chicago's only professional wizard.

== Plot summary ==
Dresden and Michael Carpenter, a Knight of the Cross, try to track down a bewildered but dangerous ghost in Cook County Hospital, are nearly ensnared by Dresden's faerie godmother the Leanansidhe, then arrested by the Chicago police. Harry is bailed out by his girlfriend Susan Rodriguez, then receives an official invitation to represent the White Council at a Red Court vampire party. He refuses to allow Susan to accompany him.

While trying to rescue a young seer, Lydia, Harry is attacked by two Red Court vampires (Kyle and Kelly Hamilton). Kelly also sexually assaults him. He manages to injure Kelly by pulling down the roof of a warehouse, and is sent into a narcotic slumber. He has a flashback dream in which he recalls events three or four months prior, when Special Investigations, Michael, and he went to capture Leonid Kravos, a sorcerer, cult leader and serial killer. The dream ends up diverging from reality; in the dream, a demon summoned by Kravos kills Michael and eats Dresden alive. When Dresden awakens, he discovers that the Nightmare's dream attack was both real and powerful, draining Harry of much of his magic. Harry realizes that the Nightmare will attack his friends and allies. He tries to warn police lieutenant Karrin Murphy and discovers that she believes he's already in her office. In Harry's guise, the Nightmare puts Murphy in a nightmare-filled coma. Dresden tries to help by putting Murphy into a dreamless sleep that he says will last until dawn. He then goes to Michael's house to warn him, but Michael's nine-months-pregnant wife Charity has gone to a 24-hour convenience store and, while there, met the Nightmare disguised as Harry.

Dresden (followed closely by Michael) tracks down the Nightmare to Graceland Cemetery, but is losing his struggle with it when the Leanansidhe appears again. She aids him in return for his pledge of service, but after he drives the Nightmare away and rescues Charity he tries to use Michael's sacred sword, Amoracchius, to break his pledge to the Leanansidhe, an act of treachery allowing her to seize the sword for herself.

Charity, injured and in labor, is brought to Cook County Hospital. Dresden tries to get medical care for his own wounds and learns that Lea healed his exterior injuries, leading the doctor on duty to scorn the idea that he could need medical care. Stallings, Murphy's partner, sees Dresden and tells him that though it is past dawn, Murphy has not awakened. He also provides Dresden with Kravos's journals, which Stallings stole from the police evidence locker. Dresden then goes to the nursery floor to find Michael and discovers that Michael's son has been born and that the baby is dying. Dresden persuades Michael not to remain at the hospital but to come help him instead. For nearly twelve hours, they gather ingredients for a summoning spell. Just before sunset, Dresden summons the Nightmare and tries to exorcise it, but this does not work. Dresden then casts a spell forcing the Nightmare to focus its attention on him, ignoring his friends.

Dresden and Michael go to the Red Court party, suspecting they will find the enemy controlling the Nightmare. Susan, who had tried calling Dresden while he was performing the exorcism, arrives with a forged invitation, unwittingly forsaking the pledge of safe conduct extended to legitimate invitees. The Leanansidhe also attends. Harry swallows a goblet of wine spiked with Red Court vampire saliva (which is both narcotic and addictive, and which he had been exposed to the day before). The Leanansidhe tricks Susan into trading a year's worth of memories of Dresden to her in return for a cure. As Harry and Michael try to safely extricate Susan from the party, they encounter Mavra, who is both a noble from another vampire Court and the sorceress controlling the Nightmare. Mavra plans to defile Michael's sword by murdering Lydia, now her prisoner, with it, in order to take revenge on Michael for killing her children and grandchildren twenty years earlier.

Harry and Michael ally with Thomas Raith, a noble of the rival White Court. They try to rescue Lydia and retake the sword, but the Red Court hostess, Bianca, offers Thomas a trade—if he will betray Dresden, Michael, and Susan, Bianca will leave his lover/food source Justine alone. Thomas agrees and kicks Susan into a crowd of Red Court vampires, who proceed to feed on her. Incoherent with rage, Dresden unleashes an unusually potent incineration spell, slaughtering many of the Red Court. He collapses, and Michael manages to drag both Dresden and Lydia to safety. Thomas and Justine are captured.

Dresden spends the next couple of days unconscious. Michael takes care of him. When he awakens, Thomas arrives at Dresden's apartment, offering Michael Amoracchius in exchange for an alliance to rescue both Susan and Justine. Lydia, now possessed by the Nightmare, attacks Dresden, throwing him across the room. Thomas uses his incubus powers to make himself irresistible to the Nightmare, which is now controlling Lydia's body; this leads to a scene where the Nightmare is trying to rape Thomas by using Lydia's body. Dresden tries to exorcise Lydia, but discovers that the Nightmare is not a demon but actually the ghost of Leonid Kravos, who (Dresden presumes) committed ritual suicide in order to empower his ghost and break down the barriers between the living and the dead.

Dresden, Thomas and Michael head toward Bianca's stronghold through the Nevernever. They meet the Leanansidhe on the way, but Thomas and Michael distract her long enough for Dresden to eat a poisonous mushroom which will kill him if he does not get treatment as soon as possible. Coerced, Lea agrees to free him for now and not to attack him in the mortal world for a year and a day. Lea, however, gets around that by calling on other fairy creatures to attack him while he's in the Nevernever rather than the mortal world. Thomas and Michael fight the fairy creatures and Dresden heads to Bianca's manor.

He reaches the manor, but is captured by Bianca and perhaps a dozen other vampires, who knew that a possible "door" to the Nevernever existed in this spot. They swiftly strip him of his weapons and his clothes. Bianca then rapes him genitally, transforming into her giant bat form as she does so, while the other vampires use their mouths to violate him (thus reinforcing the addiction the vampire Kelly Hamilton infected him with during the fight over the seer Lydia). He eventually blacks out. When he awakens, he is imprisoned with Justine and Susan. Susan has been half-turned to a Red Court vampire; the transition will be completed if she feeds on Dresden and kills him.

Dresden forestalls her nascent bloodlust by casting a spell restoring her memories. Kravos attacks, and Dresden tricks him into stopping his heart. Because the barriers have been weakened, Harry's powerful ghost appears as Susan resuscitates him with CPR. Harry and his ghost defeat Kravos, recapturing his own stolen power and draining Kravos's strength as well. After Harry's ghost dissipates, Bianca attacks, but before the barriers can re-establish themselves Harry unleashes the spirits of Bianca's many victims against her and escapes with Susan and Justine.

Harry's actions have precipitated a war between the vampire Red Court and the White Council of wizards. Susan rejects Harry's marriage proposal and leaves Chicago, knowing that her half-vampiric condition would eventually compel her to kill him, in any moment of weakness.

== Introduced characters ==
- Michael Carpenter: a carpenter by trade, and a Knight of the Cross, who wields the sword Amoracchius. He met Dresden prior to the events of this novel.
- Leonid Kravos (deceased): a sorcerer of black magic, a cult leader, and a serial killer. He died three or four months before the events of the story. He often manifests as the Nightmare and is the main antagonist of the book.
- Leanansidhe: a Sidhe of the Winter Court and Harry's faerie Godmother.
- Charity Carpenter: the wife of Michael Carpenter. She met Dresden prior to the events of this novel.
- Father Forthill: a priest at Saint Mary of the Angels church; he provides a safe house for the Knights of the Cross. He met Dresden prior to the events of this novel.
- Mortimer Lindquist: he sees dead people and communicates with them.
- Thomas Raith: a White Court vampire and the least favored child of the White King.
- Justine: Thomas' girlfriend and a woman with a secret.
- Mavra: a Black Court vampire and a sorceress.
- Don Paolo Ortega: a duke of the Red Court vampires.
- Ferrovax: a dragon, a semi-divine being of immense power and one of Bianca's party guests. He's also named Mr. Ferro.

== Reception ==
Kristine Huntley, writing for Booklist called Dresden "...a likable protagonist with more than his share of troubles, and Grave Peril will keep readers turning the pages to find out how he overcomes them".

Publishers Weekly wrote: "Despite this narrow [first person] point of view, Butcher successfully lends human dimensions to vampires and spirits through his vivid descriptions and colloquial dialogue. This over-the-top tale is more likely to entertain young adult readers than fans of [Laurell K. Hamilton and Tanya Huff]".
