= Christian McGrath =

American artist and illustrator (born 1972)

- Born: Christian McGrath; 1972 (age 53–54); Bronx, NYC, NY
- Education: The School of Visual Arts

Christian McGrath is an American artist and illustrator best known for his work on The Dresden Files. He was born in the Bronx in 1972 and became interested in art and illustration as a small child. In his youth, he was initially interested in comic books, but when he discovered the work of Frank Frazetta, he knew he wanted to be a book cover artist. His work stands out for both its atmospheric qualities and its realism of weight and proportion.

McGrath received his degree from The School of Visual Arts in 1995, and spent time teaching guitar. In 2001, he started doing illustrations professionally, and considers himself lucky to create art as his "real" job.

McGrath has done covers for New York Times best selling authors such as Jim Butcher, Brandon Sanderson, Rob Thurman, and many others.
