= Roc Books =

American fantasy publishing imprint

- Parent company: New American Library (Penguin Group)
- Status: defunct, late 2017
- Founded: 1990
- Founder: John Silbersack
- Country of origin: United States
- Headquarters location: New York City
- Official website: www.penguin.com

Roc Books was a fantasy imprint of Penguin Group, part of its New American Library. It was launched in April 1990 after Penguin Chairman Peter Mayer asked John Silbersack, the editor in chief of New American Library's science fiction (SF) program, to launch a new imprint that would draw more attention to Penguin's SF presence. The name Roc Books was chosen as a homage to Penguin's many famous bird-named publishing imprints. Roc was named after the enormous predatory bird of the Arabian Nights.

After Penguin's merger with G.P. Putnam's Sons, the imprint was aligned with Ace Books and operated by the same editorial team. In February 2018 Locus reported that Roc had been "quietly retired".

== Inaugural list ==
The first monthly list at Roc was:

- Robot Visions: Isaac Asimov
- The Warrior Lives: Joel Rosenberg
- Project Solar Sail: Arthur C. Clarke
- Among Madmen: Jim Starlin & Daina Grazuinas
- Barrow: John Deakins

== List of authors ==
- Taylor Anderson
- Isaac Asimov
- John Steakley
- Stephen Baxter
- Peter S. Beagle
- Jim Murdoch
- Steve Bein
- Carol Berg
- Anne Bishop
- M. L. Brennan
- Jim Butcher
- Rachel Caine
- Jacqueline Carey
- J. Kathleen Cheney
- Karen Chance
- Nancy A. Collins
- Arthur C. Clarke
- Glen Cook
- James K. Decker
- Bill Fawcett
- Mary Gentle
- Charles L. Grant
- Simon R. Green
- Chris Marie Green
- Laurell K. Hamilton
- Barb Hendee
- J. C. Hendee
- Douglas Hulick
- Faith Hunter
- Guy Gavriel Kay
- Caitlin R. Kiernan
- Patricia Kennealy-Morrison
- E. E. Knight
- Ursula K. Le Guin
- Dan McGirt
- Dennis L. McKiernan
- Devon Monk
- Grant Naylor
- Chloe Neill
- Andre Norton
- Terry Pratchett
- Judith and Garfield Reeves-Stevens
- Kat Richardson
- Joel Rosenberg
- Jamie Schultz
- M. J. Scott
- Luke Scull
- Thomas E. Sniegoski
- Jim Starlin
- S. M. Stirling
- Harry Turtledove
- Anne Bishop
- Kathleen Tierney
- Rob Thurman
- Boris Vallejo
- Django Wexler

Roc was publisher of FASA's game-related Battletech and Shadowrun novels beginning with Shadowrun: The Secrets of Power #2: Choose Your Enemies Carefully by Robert N. Charette in February 1991.
