= List of novels based on comics =

This is a list of officially licensed novels (and short story collections) based on established comic book and comic strip characters (i.e., media "tie-in" novels).

== DC Comics ==
=== Stand-alone novels ===
Title	Author	Publisher	ISBN	Release Date	Notes
The Adventures of Superman	George Lowther	Random House (1942); Kassel Books (1979); Applewood Books (1995)	[none] (1942) [none] (1979); 1557092281 / 9781557092281 (1995)	1942 (original); 1979 (PB); April 1995 (facsimile)	Title given on the original 1942 edition (and facsimile's) title page as simply Superman; The Adventures of... alternate title is from the original hardcover's dust jacket; the 1995 foreword by Roger Stern indicates that the 1979 facsimile edition was unauthorized.
Tales from the House of Mystery #1	Jack Oleck	Warner Books	0446752266 / 978-0446752268	January 1973	Illustrations by Bernie Wrightson
Tales from the House of Mystery #2	Jack Oleck	Warner Books	0446752568 / 978-0446752565	January 1973	Illustrations by Bernie Wrightson
Challengers of the Unknown	Ron Goulart	Dell	0440113377 / 9780440113379	November 1977	
Blackhawk	William Rotsler	Warner Books	0446304980 / 9780446304986	August 1982	Blackhawk feature originally published by Quality Comics (1941–1956), acquired by DC Comics in 1956.
Batman: The Ultimate Evil	Andrew Vachss	Warner Books	044651912X / 9780446519120 (HC); 0446603368 / 9780446603362 (PB)	November 1995 (HC); July 1996 (PB)	
The Sandman: Book of Dreams	Neil Gaiman, Ed Kramer (editors)	Harper Prism (HC); Eos (PB)	0061008338 / 9780061008337 (HC); 0061053546 / 9780061053542 (PB)	August 1996 (HC); February 1997 (PB)	Short story collection
Wonder Woman: Gods and Goddesses	John Byrne	Prima Lifestyles	0761504834 / 9780761504832 (HC); 0761517138 / 9780761517139 (PB)	October 1997 (HC); September 1998 (PB)	
The Life Story of the Flash	Mark Waid, Brian Augustyn	DC Comics	1563893657 / 9781563893650 (HC); 1563893894 / 9781563893896 (PB)	March 1998 (HC); August 1998 (PB)	Combination of prose written by Waid and Augustyn accompanied by art from previously published comic books; released as a graphic novel by DC Comics.
Gen 13: Netherwar	Christopher Golden, Jeff Mariotte	Ace Books	978-0441006212	June 1999	Comic at the time was being published by DC Comics under their Wildstorm imprint.
Gen 13: Time and Chance	Scott Ciencin, Jeff Mariotte	Ace Books	978-0441008568	June 2001	Comic at the time was being published by DC Comics under their Wildstorm imprint.
Gen 13: Version 2.0	Sholly Fisch	Ace Books	978-0441009466	May 28, 2002	Comic at the time was being published by DC Comics under their Wildstorm imprint.
The Forensic Files of Batman	Doug Moench	iBooks	074348732X / 9780743487320 (HC); 1596871156 / 9781596871151 (PB)	June 2004 (HC); September 2005 (PB)	Short story collection
It's Superman!	Tom De Haven	Chronicle Books (HC); Ballantine (PB)	0811844358 / 9780811844352 (HC); 0345493923 / 9780345493927 (PB)	September 2005 (HC); April 2006 (PB)	Adapted by GraphicAudio in March 2014.
The Last Days of Krypton	Kevin J. Anderson	William Morrow (HC); Harper (PB)	006134074X / 9780061340741 (HC); 0061340758 / 978-0061340758 (PB)	October 2007 (HC); August 2008 (PB)	
Batman and Superman: Enemies & Allies	Kevin J. Anderson	William Morrow (HC); Harper (PB)	0061662550 / 978-0061662553 (HC)	May 2009 (HC)	Adapted by GraphicAudio in May 2013.
Peter & Max: A Fables Novel	Bill Willingham, Steve Leialoha	Vertigo	1401215734 / 9781401215736	October 2009	Tie-in novel based on the Fables series
Wayne of Gotham	Tracy Hickman	DC Comics, HarperCollins	9780062074201	June 2012 (HC)	Adapted by GraphicAudio in November 2013.
JSA: Ragnarok	Paul Kupperberg	Crazy 8 Press	979-8567202524 (PB)	November 20, 2020 (PB)	Justice Society of America novel. Written in 2005 for an early 2006 release to be published by iBooks, book was put into limbo by death of iBooks publisher Byron Preiss on July 9, 2005, and subsequent Chapter 7 bankruptcy of iBooks on February 22, 2006, until finally self-published by author in November 2020. Originally planned to be book one of JSA trilogy. Book one would have been title "Freedom", book two "Limbo", and book three "Ragnarok", according to author in 2020 Afterword.
Batgirl: Possession	Jade Adia	Random House Books for Young Readers	978-0593808146	November 5, 2024	YA novel

=== Film and TV novelizations ===
Title	Author	Publisher	ISBN	Release Date	Notes
Batman vs. the Fearsome Foursome	Winston Lyon (William Woolfolk)	New American Library	None	August 1966	Novelization of the 1966 Batman movie.
Swamp Thing	David Houston, Len Wein	Pinnacle Books	0523480393 / 9780523480398	April 1982	Novelization of the 1982 Swamp Thing movie.
Superman III	William Kotzwinkle	Warner Books	0446306991 / 9780446306997	June 1983	Novelization of the 1983 Superman III movie.
Supergirl	Norma Fox Mazer	Warner Books	0446323675 / 9780446323673	November 1984	Novelization of the 1984 Supergirl movie.
Superman IV	B. B. Hiller	Scholastic	0590411950 / 9780590411950	August 1987	Young adult novelization of 1987 Superman IV: The Quest for Peace movie.
The Return of Swamp Thing	Peter David	Berkley	0515101133 / 9780515101133	May 1989	Novelization of the 1989 The Return of Swamp Thing movie.
Batman	Craig Shaw Gardner	Warner Books	0446354872 / 9780446354875	June 1989	Novelization of the 1989 Batman movie.
Batman Returns	Craig Shaw Gardner	Warner Books	0749313455 / 9780749313456	July 1992	Novelization of the 1992 Batman Returns movie.
WildC.A.T.s: Dark Blade Falling	Scott Ciencin	Random House Books for Young Readers	978-0679874805	March 28, 1995	Young readers' novelization of the 1994 Wild C.A.T.s TV series episode "Dark Blade Falling". Characters are associated with DC's Wildstorm imprint.
WildC.A.T.s: Evil Within	Scott Ciencin	Random House Books for Young Readers	978-0679874812	March 28, 1995	Young readers' novelization of the 1994 Wild C.A.T.s TV series episode "The Evil Within". Characters are associated with DC's Wildstorm imprint.
Batman Forever	Peter David	Warner Books	0446602175 / 9780446602174	June 1995	Novelization of the 1995 Batman Forever movie.
Batman & Robin	Michael Jan Friedman	Warner Books	0446604585 / 9780446604581	June 1997	Novelization of the 1997 Batman & Robin movie.
Steel	Dean Wesley Smith	Tor Books	0812539311 / 9780812539318	July 1997	Novelization of the 1997 Steel movie.
Batman Beyond: Return of the Joker	Michael Teitelbaum	Scholastic	043920769X / 9780439207690	November 2000	Novelization of the 2000 Batman Beyond: Return of the Joker animated movie.
Catwoman	Elizabeth Hand	Del Rey	0345476522 / 9780345476524	June 2004	Novelization of the 2004 Catwoman movie.
The League of Extraordinary Gentlemen	Kevin J. Anderson	Pocket Books	074347676X / 9780743476768	July 2004	Novelization of the 2004 League of Extraordinary Gentlemen movie; comic at the time was being published by DC Comics under their Wildstorm/"America's Best Comics" imprint.
Constantine	John Shirley	Pocket Books	0743497554 / 9780743497558	January 2005	Novelization of the 2005 Constantine movie.
Batman Begins	Dennis O'Neil	Del Rey Books	0345479467 / 9780345479464	June 2005	Novelization of the 2005 Batman Begins movie.
V for Vendetta	Stephen Moore	Pocket Books	1416516999 / 9781416516996	January 2006	Novelization of the 2006 V for Vendetta movie; comic initially published in the U.K. by Quality Comics in their Warrior title; picked up by DC Comics in 1988 to complete the series.
Superman Returns	Marv Wolfman	Grand Central Publishing	0446606529 / 9780446606523	June 2006	Novelization of the 2006 Superman Returns movie.
Batman: Gotham Knight	Louise Simonson	Ace	0441016138 / 9780441016136	May 2008	Young adult novel; novelization of the 2008 Batman: Gotham Knight animated movie.
The Dark Knight	Dennis O'Neil	Berkley	0425222861 / 9780425222867	July 2008	Novelization of the 2008 The Dark Knight movie.
Wonder Woman	S.D. Perry, Britta Dennison	Pocket Books	1416598731 / 9781416598732	January 2009	Novelization of the 2009 Wonder Woman animated movie.
The Dark Knight Rises	Greg Cox	Titan Books	9781781161067	July 2012	Novelization of the 2012 The Dark Knight Rises movie.
Man of Steel	Greg Cox	Titan Books	1781165998	June 2013	Novelization of the 2013 Man of Steel movie.
Suicide Squad	Marv Wolfman	Titan Books	978-1785651670	August 2016	Novelization of the 2016 Suicide Squad movie.
Wonder Woman: The Junior Novel	Steve Korté	HarperCollins	978-0062681881	May 2017	Junior novelization of the 2017 Wonder Woman movie.
Wonder Woman	Nancy Holder	Titan Books	1785653784 / 978-1785653780	June 2017	Novelization of the 2017 Wonder Woman movie.
Aquaman: The Junior Novel	Jim McCann	HarperCollins	978-0062852250	November 2018	Junior novelization of the 2018 Aquaman movie.
Shazam! The Junior Novel	Calliope Glass	HarperCollins	978-0062890894	February 2019	Junior novelization of the 2019 Shazam! movie.
Wonder Woman 1984: The Deluxe Junior Novel	Calliope Glass	HarperCollins	978-0062963352	July 2020	Junior novelization of the 2020 Wonder Woman 1984 movie.

=== Film and TV tie-in novels ===
Title	Author	Publisher	ISBN	Release Date	Notes
Batman vs. Three Villains of Doom	Winston Lyon (William Woolfolk)	New American Library	None	April 1966	Based on the Batman television series (1966–1968); plot material adapted from "The Black Cat Crimes" (Detective Comics #122, April 1947), "The Crime Parade" (Detective Comics #124, June 1947), and "The State-Bird Crimes!" (Batman #58, April 1950).
Superman: Last Son of Krypton	Elliot S. Maggin	Warner Books	9780446823197	December 1978	Sequel to the 1978 film Superman
Superman: Miracle Monday	Elliot S. Maggin	Warner Books	0446911968 / 9780446911962	May 1981	Sequel to the 1978 film Superman
Batgirl: To Dare the Darkness	Doug Moench	Little Brown and Company	9780316176958	May 1997	Tie-in to the 1997 film Batman & Robin.
Robin: Facing the Enemy	Alan Grant	Little Brown and Company	9780316176934	May 1997	Tie-in to the 1997 film Batman & Robin.
Man of Steel: The Early Years	Frank Whitman	HarperFestival	9780062236043	April 30, 2013	Prequel to the 2013 film Man of Steel.
Batman v Superman: Dawn of Justice: Cross Fire	Michael Kogge	Scholastic Inc	978-0545916301	February 2016	Junior novel prelude to the 2016 Batman v Superman: Dawn of Justice movie.
Gotham: Dawn of Darkness	Jason Starr	Titan Books	978-1785651465	January 31, 2017	Tie-in to the 2014–19 Gotham TV series.
Gotham: City of Monsters	Jason Starr	Titan Books	978-1785651489	November 28, 2017	Tie-in to the 2014–19 Gotham TV series.
Aquaman: Undertow	Steve Behling	HarperCollins	978-0062874191	November 6, 2018	Prequel to the 2018 film Aquaman.
Before the Batman: An Original Movie Novel	David Lewman	Random House Books for Young Readers	978-0593310434	February 1, 2022	Prequel to the 2022 film The Batman.
Batman: Resurrection	John Jackson Miller	Penguin Random House	978-0593871904	October 15, 2024	Sequel to the 1989 film Batman.
Superman: Welcome to Metropolis	David Lewman	Random House Books for Young Readers	979-8217027095	June 3, 2025	Prequel to the 2025 film Superman.
Batman: Revolution	John Jackson Miller	Penguin Random House	978-0593871935	October 21, 2025	Sequel to Batman: Resurrection.

=== Comic book adaptations ===
Title	Author	Publisher	ISBN	Release Date	Notes
The Death and Life of Superman	Roger Stern	Bantam Books	055309582X / 9780553095821 (HC); 0553569309 / 9780553569308 (PB)	August 1993 (HC); October 1994 (PB)	Adapts material from "The Death of Superman", "Funeral for a Friend", and "Reign of the Supermen" comic book story arcs (1992–1993).
Superman: Doomsday & Beyond	Louise Simonson	Bantam Books	0553407473 / 9780553407471	September 1993	Young adult novel; adapts material from "The Death of Superman", "Funeral for a Friend", and "Reign of the Supermen" comic book story arcs.
Batman: Knightfall	Dennis O'Neil	Bantam Books	0553096737 / 9780553096736 (HC); 0553572601 / 9780553572605 (PB)	July 1994 (HC); June 1995 (PB)	Adapts material from the "Knightfall", "Knightquest", and "KnightsEnd" comic book story arcs (1993–1994).
Batman: Knightfall & Beyond	Alan Grant	Bantam Books	0553481878 / 9780553481877	July 1994	Young adult novel; Adapts material from the "Knightfall", "Knightquest", and "KnightsEnd" comic book story arcs.
Kingdom Come	Elliot S. Maggin, with Mark Waid, Alex Ross	Warner Books	0446522341 / 9780446522342 (HC); 0446606693 / 9780446606691 (PB)	March 1998 (HC); September 1999 (PB)	Novelization of the 1996 Kingdom Come comic book limited series; comic creators Mark Waid and Alex Ross credited as co-writers.
Batman: No Man's Land	Greg Rucka	Atria (HC); Pocket Books (PB)	0671038281 / 9780671038281 (HC); 0671774557 / 9780671774554 (PB)	January 2000 (HC); February 2001 (PB)	Novelization of the No Man's Land comic book story arc (1999). Adapted by GraphicAudio in October and November 2011.
Crisis on Infinite Earths	Marv Wolfman	iBooks	0743498399 / 9780743498395 (HC); 159687290X / 9781596872905 (HC); 1596873434 / 9781596873438 (PB)	April 2005 (HC); May 2005 (HC); March 2006 (PB)	Novelization of the Crisis On Infinite Earths comic book limited series (1985–1986). Adapted by GraphicAudio in May 2009.
Infinite Crisis	Greg Cox	Ace Books	0441014445 / 9780441014446 (PB)	October 2006	Novelization of the Infinite Crisis comic book limited series (2005–2006). Adapted by GraphicAudio in May and June 2007.
52: The Novel	Greg Cox	Ace Books	0441015077 / 9780441015078 (PB)	July 2007	Novelization of the 52 comic book series (2006–2007). Adapted by GraphicAudio in December 2007 and February 2008.
Countdown	Greg Cox	Ace Books	0441017185 / 9780441017188 (PB)	July 2009	Novelization of the Countdown to Final Crisis comic book series (2007–2008). Adapted by GraphicAudio in January 2010.
Final Crisis	Greg Cox	Ace Books	0441018572 / 9780441018574 (PB)	July 2010	Novelization of the Final Crisis comic book series (2008–2009). Adapted by GraphicAudio in November 2010.

=== Video game adaptations and tie-ins ===
Title	Author	Publisher	ISBN	Release Date	Notes
Batman: Rise of Sin Tzu	Devin Grayson, Flint Dille	Warner Books	0446613924 / 9780446613927	November 2003	Based on the 2003 Batman: Rise of Sin Tzu computer game.
Batman: Arkham Knight – The Riddler's Gambit	Alex Irvine	Titan Books	1783292504 / 9781783292509	June 2015	Prequel to the Batman: Arkham Knight video game.
Batman: Arkham Knight – The Official Novelization	Marv Wolfman	Titan Books	1783292520 / 9781783292523	July 2015	Novelization of the Batman: Arkham Knight video game.

=== Which Way Books: Super Powers ===
Title	Author	Publisher	ISBN	Release Date	Notes
Superman: The Man of Steel	Andrew Helfer	Archway / Pocket Books	0-671-47463-4	June 1983	Choose Your Own Adventure-style gamebooks
Supergirl: The Girl of Steel	Andrew Helfer	Archway / Pocket Books	0-671-47566-5	July 1984	Choose Your Own Adventure-style gamebooks
Justice League of America	Robert Loren Fleming	Archway / Pocket Books	0-671-47567-3	November 1984	Choose Your Own Adventure-style gamebooks
Batman: The Doomsday Prophecy	Richard Wenk	Archway / Pocket Books	0-671-68312-8	August 1986	Choose Your Own Adventure-style gamebooks

=== The Further Adventures ===
Title	Author	Publisher	ISBN	Release Date	Notes
The Further Adventures of Batman	Martin H. Greenberg (editor)	Bantam Books	0553282700 / 9780553282702	June 1989	Short story collection
The Further Adventures of The Joker	Martin H. Greenberg (editor)	Bantam Books	0553285319 / 9780553285314	January 1990	Short story collection
The Further Adventures of Batman Volume 2: Featuring the Penguin	Martin H. Greenberg (editor)	Bantam Books	0553560123 / 9780553560121	June 1992	Short story collection
The Further Adventures of Batman Volume 3: Featuring Catwoman	Martin H. Greenberg (editor)	Bantam Books	0553560697 / 9780553560695	February 1993	Short story collection
The Further Adventures of Wonder Woman	Martin H. Greenberg (editor)	Bantam Books	0553286242 / 9780553286243	August 1993	Short story collection
The Further Adventures of Superman	Martin H. Greenberg (editor)	Bantam Books	0553285688 / 9780553285680	October 1993	Short story collection
Legends of the Batman	Martin H. Greenberg (editor)	MJF Books	1567312195 / 9781567312195	June 1997	Short story collection; reprints stories previously published in Greenberg's Further Adventures series, plus two previously unpublished stories by Dennis O'Neil.
Tales of the Batman	Martin H. Greenberg (editor)	MJF Books	1567310761 / 9781567310764	July 1997	Short story collection; reprints stories previously published in Greenberg's Further Adventures series.
Adventures of the Batman	Martin H. Greenberg (editor)	MJF Books	156731077X / 9781567310771	July 1997	Short story collection; reprints stories previously published in Greenberg's Further Adventures series.

=== Batman by Warner Books ===
Title	Author	Publisher	ISBN	Release Date	Notes
The Batman Murders	Craig Shaw Gardner	Warner Books	0446360406 / 9780446360401	September 1990	
Batman: To Stalk a Specter	Simon Hawke	Warner Books	0446360414 / 9780446360418	January 1991	
Batman: Captured by the Engines	Joe R. Lansdale	Warner Books	0446360422 / 9780446360425	June 1991	
Catwoman: Tiger Hunt	Lynn Abbey and Robert Asprin	Warner Books	0446360430 / 9780446360432	September 1992	

=== Batman: The Animated Series ===
Title	Author	Publisher	ISBN	Release Date	Notes
Batman: Shadows of the Past	Geary Gravel	Bantam Books	0553563653 / 9780553563658	October 1993	Young adult novel; based on Batman: The Animated Series (1992–1995).
Batman: Mask of the Phantasm – The Animated Movie	Geary Gravel	Bantam Books	0553565818 / 9780553565812	December 1993	Young adult novelization of the 1993 Batman: Mask of the Phantasm animated movie.
Batman: Duel to the Death	Geary Gravel	Bantam Books	055356501X / 9780553565010	January 1994	Young adult novel; based on Batman: The Animated Series.
Batman: The Dragon and the Bat	Geary Gravel	Bantam Books	0553566083 / 9780553566086	May 1994	Young adult novel; based on Batman: The Animated Series.
Batman: SubZero	James Raven	Little, Brown and Company	0316176966 / 9780316176965	May 1997	Young adult novelization of the 1997 Batman & Mr. Freeze: SubZero animated movie.
Batman: Mystery of the Batwoman	Louise Simonson	Bantam Books	0553487779 / 9780553487770	October 2003	Young adult novelization of the 2003 Batman: Mystery of the Batwoman animated movie.

=== Lois & Clark: The New Adventures of Superman ===
Title	Author	Publisher	ISBN	Release Date	Notes
Lois & Clark: The New Adventures of Superman - Heat Wave	Michael Jan Friedman	HarperCollins	0061010618 / 9780061010613	April 1996	Based on the Lois & Clark: The New Adventures of Superman television series (1993–1997).
Lois & Clark: The New Adventures of Superman - Exile	Michael Jan Friedman	HarperCollins	0061010626 / 9780061010620	May 1996	Based on the Lois & Clark: The New Adventures of Superman television series (1993–1997).
Lois & Clark: The New Adventures of Superman - Deadly Games	Michael Jan Friedman	HarperCollins	0061010634 / 9780061010637	June 1996	Based on the Lois & Clark: The New Adventures of Superman television series (1993–1997).
Lois & Clark: A Superman Novel	C. J. Cherryh	Prima Lifestyles	0761504826 / 9780761504825 (HC); 0761511695 / 9780761511694 (PB)	August 1996 (HC); September 1997 (PB)	Based on the Lois & Clark: The New Adventures of Superman television series (1993–1997).

=== Smallville ===
Title	Author	Publisher	ISBN	Release Date	Notes
Adult novels
Smallville: Strange Visitors	Roger Stern	Warner Books	0446612138 / 9780446612135	October 2002	Based on the Smallville television series.
Smallville: Dragon	Alan Grant	Warner Books	0446612146 / 9780446612142	November 2002	Based on the Smallville television series.
Smallville: Hauntings	Nancy Holder	Warner Books	0446612154 / 9780446612159	January 2003	Based on the Smallville television series.
Smallville: Whodunnit	Dean Wesley Smith	Warner Books	0446612162 / 9780446612166	March 2003	Based on the Smallville television series.
Smallville: Shadows	Diana G. Gallagher	Warner Books	0446613606 / 9780446613606	September 2003	Based on the Smallville television series.
Smallville: Silence	Nancy Holder	Warner Books	0446613592 / 9780446613590	November 2003	Based on the Smallville television series.
Smallville: Curse	Alan Grant	Warner Books	0446613614 / 9780446613613	January 2004	Based on the Smallville television series.
Smallville: City	Devin Grayson	Warner Books	0446613622 / 9780446613620	March 2004	Based on the Smallville television series.
Young Adult novels
Smallville: Arrival	Michael Teitelbaum	Little, Brown and Company	0316173592 / 9780316173599	October 2002	Young adult novelization of the pilot episode of the Smallville television series.
Smallville: See No Evil	Cherie Bennett, Jeff Gottesfeld	Little, Brown and Company	0316173010 / 9780316173018	October 2002	Young adult novel; based on the Smallville television series.
Smallville: Flight	Cherie Bennett, Jeff Gottesfeld	Little, Brown and Company	0316174688 / 9780316174688	December 2002	Young adult novel; based on the Smallville television series.
Smallville: Animal Rage	David Cody Weiss, Bobbi J.G. Weiss	Little, Brown and Company	0316174211 / 9780316174213	February 2003	Young adult novel; based on the Smallville television series.
Smallville: Speed	Cherie Bennett, Jeff Gottesfeld	Little, Brown and Company	0316168165 / 9780316168168	April 2003	Young adult novel; based on the Smallville television series.
Smallville: Buried Secrets	Suzan Colon	Little, Brown and Company	0316168483 / 9780316168489	June 2003	Young adult novel; based on the Smallville television series.
Smallville: Runaway	Suzan Colon	Little, Brown and Company	0316734764 / 9780316734769	October 2003	Young adult novel; based on the Smallville television series.
Smallville: Greed	Cherie Bennett, Jeff Gottesfeld	Little, Brown and Company	0316734772 / 9780316734776	December 2003	Young adult novel; based on the Smallville television series.
Smallville: Temptation	Suzan Colon	Little, Brown and Company	0316734780 / 9780316734783	February 2004	Young adult novel; based on the Smallville television series.
Smallville: Sparks	Cherie Bennett, Jeff Gottesfeld	Little, Brown and Company	0316734799 / 9780316734790	April 2004	Young adult novel; based on the Smallville television series.

=== Justice League (2001–04) ===
Title	Author	Publisher	ISBN	Release Date	Notes
Justice League: Secret Origins	Michael Teitelbaum	Bantam Books	0553487701 / 9780553487701	August 2002	Young adult novelization of the pilot episode of the Justice League animated series (2001–2004).
Justice League: In Darkest Night	Louise Simonson	Bantam Books	055348771X / 9780553487718	August 2002	Young adult novel; based on the Justice League animated series.
Justice League: Wings of War	Michael Jan Friedman	Bantam Books	0553487728 / 9780553487725	October 2002	Young adult novel; based on the Justice League animated series.
Justice League: The Gauntlet	Louise Simonson	Bantam Books	0553487736 / 9780553487732	October 2002	Young adult novel; based on the Justice League animated series.
Justice League: Red Justice	Michael Teitelbaum	Bantam Books	0553487744 / 9780553487749	March 2003	Young adult novel; based on the Justice League animated series.
Justice League: Wild at Heart	Louise Simonson	Bantam Books	0553487752 / 978-0553487756	March 2003	Young adult novel; based on the Justice League animated series.
Justice League: No Man Is an Island	Alan Grant	Bantam Books	0553487817 / 9780553487817	July 2003	Young adult novel; based on the Justice League animated series.
Justice League: A Golden Opportunity	Michael Teitelbaum	Bantam Books	0553487795 / 9780553487794	September 2003	Young adult novel; based on the Justice League animated series.
Justice League: A League of His Own	Michael Jan Friedman	Bantam Books	0553487787 / 9780553487787	November 2003	Young adult novel; based on the Justice League animated series.
Justice League: Speed Trap	Brian Augustyn	Bantam Books	0553487809 / 9780553487800	November 2003	Young adult novel; based on the Justice League animated series.

=== Justice League of America ===
Title	Author	Publisher	ISBN	Release Date	Notes
Batman: The Stone King	Alan Grant	Pocket Books	0743417100 / 9780743417105	March 2002	Justice League of America series. Adapted by GraphicAudio in July 2008.
Wonder Woman: Mythos	Carol Lay	Pocket Books	0743417119 / 9780743417112	January 2003	Justice League of America series. Adapted by GraphicAudio in January 2009.
The Flash: Stop Motion	Mark Schultz	Pocket Books	0743417135 / 9780743417136	February 2004	Justice League of America series. Adapted by GraphicAudio in November 2008.
JLA: Exterminators	Christopher Golden	Pocket Books	0743417151 / 9780743417150	June 2004	Justice League of America series. Adapted by GraphicAudio in May 2008.
Green Lantern: Hero's Quest	Dennis O'Neil	Pocket Books	0743417127 / 9780743417129	April 2005	Justice League of America series. Adapted by GraphicAudio in March 2009.
Superman: The Never-Ending Battle	Roger Stern	Pocket Books	0743417143 / 9780743417143	May 2005	Justice League of America series. Adapted by GraphicAudio in September 2008.

=== The Books of Magic ===
Title	Author	Publisher	ISBN	Release Date	Notes
The Invitation	Carla Jablonski	Eos / HarperCollins	TBA	May 2003	Adaptation of The Books of Magic miniseries
Bindings	Carla Jablonski	Eos / HarperCollins	TBA	May 2003	Adaptation of The Books of Magic: Bindings
The Children's Crusade	Carla Jablonski	Eos / HarperCollins	TBA	August 2003	Adaptation of The Children's Crusade crossover
Consequences	Carla Jablonski	Eos / HarperCollins	TBA	January 2004	Adaptation of The Books of Magic: Summonings
Lost Places	Carla Jablonski	Eos / HarperCollins	TBA	May 2004	Adaptation of The Books of Magic: Reckonings
Reckonings	Carla Jablonski	Eos / HarperCollins	TBA	October 2004	Adaptation of The Books of Magic: Reckonings, Transformations, Girl in the Box, The Burning Girl, Death After Death and The Books of Faerie

=== Green Lantern: Sleepers ===
Title	Author	Publisher	ISBN	Release Date	Notes
Green Lantern: Sleepers Book One	Christopher J. Priest	iBooks	0743487249 / 9780743487245 (HC); 1416504273 / 9781416504276 (PB)	July 2004 (HC); April 2005 (PB)	Adapted by GraphicAudio in April 2011.
Green Lantern: Sleepers Book Two	Christopher J. Priest	iBooks	1596870346 / 9781596870345 (HC); 1596871350 / 9781596871359 (PB)	February 2005 (HC); October 2005 (PB)	Adapted by GraphicAudio in June 2011.
Green Lantern: Sleepers Book Three	Christopher J. Priest	iBooks	1596871032 / 9781596871038 (HC)	September 2005 (HC)	Adapted by GraphicAudio in August 2011.

=== DC Universe ===
Title	Author	Publisher	ISBN	Release Date	Notes
DC Universe: Last Sons	Alan Grant	Grand Central Publishing	0446616567 / 9780446616560	February 2006	Featuring Superman, the Martian Manhunter and Lobo. Adapted by GraphicAudio in March 2010.
DC Universe: Inheritance	Devin Grayson	Grand Central Publishing	0446616575 / 9780446616577	June 2006	Featuring Batman, Robin/Nightwing, the Green Arrow, Arsenal, Aquaman and Aqualad.
DC Universe: Helltown	Dennis O'Neil	Grand Central Publishing	0446616583 / 9780446616584	November 2006	Featuring Batman and the Question.
DC Universe: Trail of Time	Jeff Mariotte	Grand Central Publishing	0446616591 / 9780446616591	February 2007	Featuring Superman, the Phantom Stranger, Etrigan, Jonah Hex and Bat Lash. Adapted by GraphicAudio in July 2010.

=== John Constantine Hellblazer ===
Title	Author	Publisher	ISBN	Release Date	Notes
Hellblazer: War Lord	John Shirley	Pocket Star Books	978-1416503439	January 31, 2006	
Hellblazer: Subterranean	John Shirley	Pocket Star Books	978-1416503446	November 28, 2006	

=== Batman by Del Rey ===
Title	Author	Publisher	ISBN	Release Date	Notes
Batman: Dead White	John Shirley	Del Rey	0345479440 / 9780345479440	July 2006	Adapted by GraphicAudio in July 2009.
Batman: Inferno	Alex Irvine	Del Rey	0345479459 / 9780345479457	October 2006	Adapted by GraphicAudio in September 2009.
Batman: Fear Itself	Michael Reaves, Steven-Elliot Altman	Del Rey	0345479432 / 9780345479433	February 2007	Featuring Batman and the Scarecrow.

=== Lois Lane ===
Title	Author	Publisher	ISBN	Release Date	Notes
Lois Lane: Fallout	Gwenda Bond	Switch Press	1630790052 / 9781630790059	May 2015	Young adult novel
Lois Lane: Double Down	Gwenda Bond	Switch Press	1630790389 / 9781630790387	May 2016	Young adult novel
Lois Lane: Triple Threat	Gwenda Bond	Switch Press	1630790826 / 978-1630790820	May 2017	Young adult novel

=== Arrowverse ===
Title	Author	Publisher	ISBN	Release Date	Notes
Arrow
Arrow: Vengeance	Oscar Balderrama and Lauren Certo	Titan Books	978-1783295517	February 23, 2016	
Arrow: A Generation of Vipers	Susan Griffith and Clay Griffith	Titan Books	978-1783295791	March 28, 2017	
Arrow: Fatal Legacies	Marc Guggenheim and James R. Tuck	Titan Books	978-1783296774	September 26, 2017	
The Flash
The Flash: The Haunting of Barry Allen	Susan Griffith and Clay Griffith	Titan Books	978-1785651410	November 29, 2016	
The Flash: Climate Changeling	Richard A. Knaak	Titan Books	978-1785651434	November 28, 2017	
The Flash: Hocus Pocus	Barry Lyga	Amulet Books / ABRAMS	978-1419728150	October 3, 2017	The Flash trilogy
The Flash: Johnny Quick	Barry Lyga	Amulet Books / ABRAMS	978-1683352532	April 10, 2018	The Flash trilogy
The Flash: The Tornado Twins	Barry Lyga	Amulet Books / ABRAMS	978-1683353904	October 2, 2018	The Flash trilogy
The Flash: Green Arrow's Perfect Shot	Barry Lyga	Amulet Books / ABRAMS	978-1419746949	August 13, 2019	Crossover Crisis trilogy
The Flash: Supergirl's Sacrifice	Barry Lyga	Amulet Books / ABRAMS	978-1683355724	May 26, 2020	Crossover Crisis trilogy
The Flash: The Legends of Forever	Barry Lyga	Amulet Books / ABRAMS	978-1683359821	March 23, 2021	Crossover Crisis trilogy
Supergirl
Supergirl: Age of Atlantis	Jo Whittemore	Amulet Books / ABRAMS	978-1419728143	November 2017	Supergirl trilogy
Supergirl: Curse of the Ancients	Jo Whittemore	Amulet Books / ABRAMS	978-1683352549	May 2018	Supergirl trilogy
Supergirl: Master of Illusion	Jo Whittemore	Amulet Books / ABRAMS	978-1683354086	January 8, 2019	Supergirl trilogy

=== DC Backstories ===
Title	Author	Publisher	ISBN	Release Date	Notes
Superman: The Man of Tomorrow	Daniel Wallace	Scholastic	TBA	January 26, 2016	
Batman: Gotham City's Guardian	Matthew K. Manning	Scholastic	TBA	January 26, 2016	
Wonder Woman: Amazon Warrior	Steve Korte	Scholastic	TBA	February 23, 2016	
Harley Quinn: Wild Card	Liz Marsham	Scholastic	TBA	May 31, 2016	
Supergirl: Daughter of Krypton	Daniel Wallace	Scholastic	TBA	August 30, 2016	
Batgirl: New Hero of the Night	Matthew K. Manning	Scholastic	TBA	March 28, 2017	

=== DC Super Hero Girls ===
Title	Author	Publisher	ISBN	Release Date	Notes
Wonder Woman at Super Hero High	Lisa Yee	Random House Books for Young Readers	110194059X / 978-1101940594	March 2016	DC Super Hero Girls series
Supergirl at Super Hero High	Lisa Yee	Random House Books for Young Readers	110194062X / 978-1101940624	July 2016	DC Super Hero Girls series
Batgirl at Super Hero High	Lisa Yee	Random House Books for Young Readers	1101940654 / 978-1101940655	January 2017	DC Super Hero Girls series
Katana at Super Hero High	Lisa Yee	Random House Books for Young Readers	1101940689 / 978-1101940686	July 2017	DC Super Hero Girls series
Harley Quinn at Super Hero High	Lisa Yee	Random House Books for Young Readers	1524769231 / 978-1524769239	January 2018	DC Super Hero Girls series
Bumblebee at Super Hero High	Lisa Yee	Random House Books for Young Readers	1524769266 / 978-1524769260	July 2018	DC Super Hero Girls series

=== DC Icons ===
Title	Author	Publisher	ISBN	Release Date	Notes
Wonder Woman: Warbringer	Leigh Bardugo	Random House Books for Young Readers	978-0399549731	August 2017	YA novel
Batman: Nightwalker	Marie Lu	Random House Books for Young Readers	978-0399549786	January 2018	YA novel
Catwoman: Soulstealer	Sarah J. Maas	Random House Books for Young Readers	978-0399549694	August 2018	YA novel
Superman: Dawnbreaker	Matt de la Peña	Random House Books for Young Readers	978-0399549687	March 3, 2020	YA novel
Black Canary: Breaking Silence	Alexandra Monir	Random House Books for Young Readers	978-0593178317	December 29, 2020	YA novel
Harley Quinn: Reckoning	Rachael Allen	Ember	978-0593429877	April 25, 2023	YA novel
Harley Quinn: Ravenous	Rachael Allen	Ember	978-0593429914	April 2, 2024	YA novel
Harley Quinn: Redemption	Rachael Allen	Ember	978-0593429945	Apr 23, 2024	YA novel

=== DC Comics novels series ===
Title	Author	Publisher	ISBN	Release Date	Notes
Batman: The Killing Joke	Christa Faust	Titan Books	1785658107 / 978-1785658105 (HC); 1785658123 / 978-1785658129 (PB)	September 25, 2018 (HC); February 19, 2019 (PB)	DC Comics novels series
Harley Quinn: Mad Love	Paul Dini	Titan Books	1785658131 / 978-1785658136 (HC); 1785658158 / 978-1785658150 (PB)	November 13, 2018 (HC); September 10, 2019 (PB)	DC Comics novels series
Batman: The Court of Owls	Greg Cox	Titan Books	1785658166 / 978-1785658167 (HC); 1785658182 / 978-1785658181 (PB)	February 19, 2019 (HC); November 5, 2019 (PB)	DC Comics novels series

=== Wonder Woman Adventures ===
Title	Author	Publisher	ISBN	Release Date	Notes
Diana and the Island of No Return	Aisha Saeed	Random House Children's Books	978-0593178362	July 14, 2020	
Diana and the Underworld Odyssey	Aisha Saeed	Random House Children's Books	978-0593178393	May 25, 2021	
Diana and the Journey to the Unknown	Aisha Saeed	Random House Children's Books	978-0593178430	May 31, 2022	

== Marvel Comics ==
=== Stand-alone novels ===
Title	Author	Publisher	ISBN	Release Date	Notes
The Avengers Battle the Earth-Wrecker	Otto Binder	Bantam Books	None	1967	
Captain America: The Great Gold Steal	Ted White	Bantam Books	None	1968	
X-Men: Cyclops and Phoenix	Paul Mantell; Avery Hart	Random House	0679876596 / 9780679876595	October 1995	Young adult novel; "based on comics by Scott Lobdell"
X-Men: Sabretooth Unleashed	Vicki Kamida	Random House	0679876618 / 9780679876618	October 1995	Young adult novel; "based on comics by Larry Hama and Fabian Nicieza"
Star Trek: The Next Generation/X-Men: Planet X	Michael Jan Friedman	Pocket Books	0671019163 / 9780671019167	May 1998	One of three separate crossovers between Marvel (with all three featuring the X-Men) and Star Trek (the other two were in the comics); Marvel at the time was publishing Star Trek comics (1996–1998)
Iron Man: Femme Fatales	Robert Greenberger	Del Rey Books	0345506855 / 9780345506856	September 29, 2009	
Iron Man: Virus	Alex Irvine	Del Rey Books	0345506847 / 9780345506849	January 26, 2010	
Rogue Touch	Christine Woodward	Kingswell	978-1401311025	May 1, 2013	
The She-Hulk Diaries	Marta Acosta	Kingswell	978-1401311018	June 18, 2013	
Marvel Super Heroes: Secret Wars	Alex Irvine	Marvel Enterprises	978-0785191001	January 7, 2015	Adapted from the 1984-85 storyline by Jim Shooter, Mike Zeck & Bob Layton. Adapted by GraphicAudio in February 2015.
Storm: Dawn of a Goddess	Tiffany D. Jackson	Random House Children's Books	978-0593308851	June 4, 2024	
Agatha Harkness: Fall of the Coven	Sara Shepard	Random House	978-1368114691	May 5, 2026	

=== Film novelizations ===
Title	Author	Publisher	ISBN	Release date	Notes
Howard the Duck	Ellis Weiner	Pocket Books	0425092755 / 9780425092750	August 1986	Novelization of 1986 Howard the Duck movie
Blade	Mel Odom	Harper	0061059137 / 9780061059131	August 1998	Novelization of 1998 Blade movie
X-Men	Kristine Kathryn Rusch, Dean Wesley Smith	Del Rey Books	0345440951 / 9780345440952	June 2000	Novelization of 2000 X-Men movie
Spider-Man	Peter David	Del Rey	0345450051 / 9780345450050	March 2002	Novelization of 2002 Spider-Man movie
Daredevil	Greg Cox	Onyx	9780451410801	January 2003	Novelization of 2003 Daredevil movie
X-Men 2	Chris Claremont	Del Rey	0345461967 / 9780345461964	March 2003	Novelization of 2003 X-Men 2 movie
Hulk	Peter David	Del Rey	0345459679 / 9780345459671	April 2003	Novelization of 2003 Hulk movie
The Punisher	D.A. Stern	Del Rey	0345475569 / 9780345475565	March 2004	Novelization of 2004 The Punisher movie
Spider-Man 2	Peter David	Del Rey	0345470540 / 9780345470546	May 2004	Novelization of 2004 Spider-Man 2 movie
Blade: Trinity	Natasha Rhodes	Black Flame	1844161064 / 9781844161065	October 2004	Novelization of 2004 Blade: Trinity movie
Elektra	Yvonne Navarro	Pocket Books	1416505059 / 9781416505051	December 2004	Novelization of 2004 Elektra movie
Fantastic Four	Peter David	Pocket Books	1416509801 / 9781416509806	May 2005	Novelization of 2005 Fantastic Four movie
X-Men: The Last Stand	Chris Claremont	Del Rey	0345492110 / 9780345492111	May 2006	Novelization of 2006 X-Men: The Last Stand movie
Ghost Rider	Greg Cox	Pocket Books	1416538186 / 9781416538189	January 2007	Novelization of 2007 Ghost Rider movie
Spider-Man 3	Peter David	Pocket Books	1416527214 / 9781416527213	March 2007	Novelization of 2007 Spider-Man 3 movie
Fantastic Four: Rise of the Silver Surfer	Daniel Josephs	Pocket Books	1416548092 / 9781416548096	April 2007	Novelization of 2007 Fantastic Four: Rise of the Silver Surfer movie
Iron Man	Peter David	Pocket Books	034550609X / 9780345506092	April 2008	Novelization of 2008 Iron Man movie
The Incredible Hulk	Peter David	Pocket Books	0345506995 / 978-0345506993	May 2008	Novelization of 2008 The Incredible Hulk movie

=== Film tie-in novels ===
Title	Author	Publisher	ISBN	Release date	Notes
Avengers: Infinity War: The Heroes' Journey	Steve Behling	Little, Brown Books for Young Readers	978-0316482905	April 3, 2018	
Avengers: Infinity War: The Cosmic Quest Volume One: Beginning	Brandon T. Snider	Little, Brown Books for Young Readers	978-0316482592	April 3, 2018	
Ant-Man and the Wasp: The Heroes' Journey	Steve Behling	Little, Brown Books for Young Readers	978-0316480505	June 5, 2018	
Avengers: Infinity War: The Cosmic Quest Volume Two: Aftermath	Brandon T. Snider	Little, Brown Books for Young Readers	978-0316482820	November 20, 2018	
Thanos: Titan Consumed	Barry Lyga	Little, Brown Books for Young Readers	978-0316482516	November 20, 2018	Although made to tie-in with 2018's Avengers: Infinity War, it was announced to be non-canon to the MCU shortly after announcement.
Captain Marvel: Starforce Mission Log	Ellen Roussos	Printers Row	978-0794443160	January 29, 2019	
Captain Marvel: Higher, Further, Faster	Liza Palmer	Marvel Press	978-1368050586	February 5, 2019	
Captain Marvel: Starforce on the Rise	Steve Behling	Marvel Press	978-1368050555	February 5, 2019	
Avengers: Infinity War: Destiny Arrives	Liza Palmer	Marvel Press	978-1368052375	April 2, 2019	
The Pirate Angel, The Talking Tree, and Captain Rabbit	Steve Behling	Disney Book Group	978-1368050548	April 2, 2019	Prequel to Avengers: Endgame.
Look Out for the Little Guy!	Rob Kutner	Hyperion Avenue	978-1368090131	September 5, 2023	Presented Scott Lang's autobiography featured in Ant-Man and the Wasp: Quantumania.
Black Panther: Who is the Black Panther?	Jesse Holland	Titan Books	978-1785659478		Tie-in prequel to Black Panther (2018)

=== Marvel Novel Series ===
Title	Author	Publisher	ISBN	Release Date	Notes
The Amazing Spider-Man: Mayhem in Manhattan	Len Wein, Marv Wolfman	Pocket Books	0671820443 / 9780671820442	March 1978	Marvel Novel Series #1
The Incredible Hulk: Stalker From the Stars	Len Wein, Marv Wolfman, Joseph Silva	Pocket Books	0671820842 / 9780671820848	October 1978	Marvel Novel Series #2
The Incredible Hulk: Cry of the Beast	Richard S. Meyers	Pocket Books	0671820850 / 9780671820855	March 1979	Marvel Novel Series #3
Captain America: Holocaust for Hire	Joseph Silva	Pocket Books	0671820869 / 9780671820862	April 1979	Marvel Novel Series #4
The Fantastic Four: Doomsday	Marv Wolfman	Pocket Books	0671820877 / 9780671820879	April 1979	Marvel Novel Series #5
Iron Man: And Call My Killer...MODOK!	William Rotsler	Pocket Books	0671820893 / 9780671820893	May 1979	Marvel Novel Series #6
Doctor Strange: Nightmare	William Rotsler	Pocket Books	0671820885 / 9780671820886	June 1979	Marvel Novel Series #7
The Amazing Spider-Man: Crime Campaign	Paul Kupperberg	Pocket Books	0671820907 / 9780671820909	July 1979	Marvel Novel Series #8
The Marvel Superheroes	Len Wein, Marv Wolfman (editors)	Pocket Books	0671820915 / 9780671820916	August 1979	Marvel Novel Series #9; short story collection; includes stories featuring the Avengers (written by Jim Shooter), Daredevil (written by Martin Pasko as "Kyle Christopher"), the X-Men (written by Jo Duffy), and the Hulk (written by Len Wein).
The Avengers: The Man Who Stole Tomorrow	David Michelinie	Pocket Books	0671820931 / 9780671820930	September 1979	Marvel Novel Series #10
The Hulk and Spider-Man: Murdermoon	Paul Kupperberg	Pocket Books	067182094X / 9780671820947	October 1979	Marvel Novel Series #11

=== Marvel Super Heroes Adventure Gamebooks ===
Title	Author	Publisher	ISBN	Release Date	Notes
The Amazing Spider-Man: City in Darkness	Jeff Grubb	TSR	TBA	August 1, 1986	Choose Your Own Adventure-style gamebooks
Captain America: Rocket's Red Glare	Kate Novak	TSR	TBA	August 1, 1986	Choose Your Own Adventure-style gamebooks
The Wolverine: Night of the Wolverine	Jerry Epperson	TSR	TBA	November 1, 1986	Choose Your Own Adventure-style gamebooks
Doctor Strange: Through Six Dimensions	Allen Varney	TSR	TBA	March 1, 1987	Choose Your Own Adventure-style gamebooks
The Thing: One Thing After Another	Warren Spector	TSR	TBA	June 1, 1987	Choose Your Own Adventure-style gamebooks
The Uncanny X-Men: An X-cellent Death	Kate Novak	TSR	TBA	November 1, 1987	Choose Your Own Adventure-style gamebooks
The Amazing Spider-Man: As the World Burns	Peter David	TSR	TBA	December 1, 1987	Choose Your Own Adventure-style gamebooks
Daredevil: Guilt by Association	Matthew Costello	TSR	TBA	February 1, 1988	Choose Your Own Adventure-style gamebooks

=== Berkley Boulevard ===
Title	Author	Publisher	ISBN	Release Date	Notes
Spider-Man
Spider-Man: The Venom Factor	Diane Duane	Putnam/Byron Preiss Multimedia Co. (BPMC) (HC); Berkley Boulevard/BPMC (PB)	0399140026 / 9780399140020 (HC); 1572970383 / 9781572970380 (PB)	October 1994 (HC); November 1995 (PB)	Trilogy by Diane Duane
Spider-Man: The Lizard Sanction	Diane Duane	Putnam/BPMC (HC); Berkley Boulevard/BPMC (PB)	0399141057 / 9780399141058 (HC); 1572971487 / 9781572971486 (PB)	October 1995 (HC); August 1996 (PB)	Trilogy by Diane Duane
Spider-Man: The Octopus Agenda	Diane Duane	Putnam/BPMC (HC); Berkley Boulevard/BPMC (PB)	0399142118 / 978-0399142116 (HC); 1572972793 / 9781572972797 (PB)	November 1996 (HC); August 1997 (PB)	Trilogy by Diane Duane
Spider-Man: Carnage in New York	David Michelinie, Dean Wesley Smith	Berkley Boulevard/BPMC	1572970197 / 9781572970199	August 1995	Duology by David Michelinie and Dean Wesley Smith
Spider-Man: Goblin's Revenge	Dean Wesley Smith	Berkley Boulevard/BPMC	157297172X / 9781572971721	October 1996	Duology by David Michelinie and Dean Wesley Smith
Spider-Man: The Gathering of the Sinister Six	Adam-Troy Castro	Berkley Boulevard/BPMC	0425167747 / 9780425167748	March 1999	Trilogy by Castro
Spider-Man: Revenge of the Sinister Six	Adam-Troy Castro	BP Books/iBooks	0743434668 / 9780743434669 (HC); 0743444639 / 9780743444637 (PB)	July 2001 (HC); April 2002 (PB)	Trilogy by Castro
Spider-Man: Secret of the Sinister Six	Adam-Troy Castro	BP Books/iBooks	0743444647 / 9780743444644 (HC); 074345832X / 9780743458320 (PB)	March 2002 (HC); February 2003 (PB)	Trilogy by Castro
Spider-Man: Valley of the Lizard	John Vornholt	Berkley Boulevard/BPMC	1572973331 / 9781572973336	February 1998	
Spider-Man: Wanted: Dead or Alive	Craig Shaw Gardner	Putnam/BPMC (HC); Berkley Boulevard/BPMC (PB)	0399143858 / 9780399143854 (HC); 0425169308 / 978-0425169308 (PB)	May 1998 (HC); April 1999 (PB)	
Spider-Man: Venom's Wrath	Keith R.A. DeCandido, Jose R. Nieto	Berkley Boulevard/BPMC	0425165744 / 9780425165744	October 1998	
Spider-Man: Goblin Moon	Kurt Busiek, Nathan Archer	Putnam/BPMC (HC); Berkley Boulevard/BPMC (PB)	0399145125 / 9780399145124 (HC); 0425174034 / 9780425174036 (PB)	June 1999 (HC); July 2000 (PB)	
Spider-Man: Emerald Mystery	Dean Wesley Smith	Berkley Boulevard	0425170373 / 9780425170373	October 2000	
Iron Man
Iron Man: The Armor Trap	Greg Cox	Berkley Boulevard/BPMC	1572970081 / 9781572970083	July 1995	Followed by Operation A.I.M.
Iron Man: Operation A.I.M.	Greg Cox	Berkley Boulevard/BPMC	1572971959 / 9781572971950	December 1996	Sequel to The Armor Trap
X-Men: Mutant Empire
X-Men: Mutant Empire Book One: Siege	Christopher Golden	Berkley Boulevard/BPMC	1572971142 / 9781572971141	May 1996	Mutant Empire trilogy
X-Men: Mutant Empire Book Two: Sanctuary	Christopher Golden	Berkley Boulevard/BPMC	1572971800 / 9781572971806	November 1996	Mutant Empire trilogy
X-Men: Mutant Empire Book Three: Salvation	Christopher Golden	Berkley Boulevard/BPMC	1572972475 / 9781572972476	May 1997	Mutant Empire trilogy
Doom's Day
Spider-Man and the Incredible Hulk: Doom's Day Book One: Rampage	Danny Fingeroth, Eric Fein	Berkley Boulevard/BPMC	1572971649 / 9781572971646	September 1996	Doom's Day trilogy
Spider-Man and Iron Man: Doom's Day Book Two: Sabotage	Pierce Askegren, Danny Fingeroth	Berkley Boulevard/BPMC	1572972351 / 9781572972353	March 1997	Doom's Day trilogy
Spider-Man and Fantastic Four: Doom's Day Book Three: Wreckage	Eric Fein, Pierce Askegren	Berkley Boulevard/BPMC	1572973110 / 978-1572973114	November 1997	Doom's Day trilogy
X-Men and Spider-Man: Time's Arrow
X-Men and Spider-Man: Time's Arrow Book 1: The Past	Tom DeFalco, Jason Henderson	Berkley Boulevard/BPMC	0425164527 / 9780425164525	July 1998	Time's Arrow trilogy
X-Men and Spider-Man: Time's Arrow Book 2: The Present	Tom DeFalco, Adam-Troy Castro	Berkley Boulevard/BPMC	0425164152 / 9780425164150	August 1998	Time's Arrow trilogy
X-Men and Spider-Man: Time's Arrow Book 3: The Future	Tom DeFalco, Eluki Bes Shahar	Berkley Boulevard/BPMC	0425165000 / 9780425165003	September 1998	Time's Arrow trilogy
X-Men and the Avengers: Gamma Quest
X-Men and the Avengers: Gamma Quest Book 1: Lost and Found	Greg Cox	Berkley Boulevard/BPMC	0425169731 / 9780425169735	July 1999	Gamma Quest trilogy
X-Men and the Avengers: Gamma Quest Book 2: Search and Rescue	Greg Cox	Berkley Boulevard/BPMC	0425169898 / 9780425169896	August 1999	Gamma Quest trilogy
X-Men and the Avengers: Gamma Quest Book 3: Friend or Foe?	Greg Cox	Berkley Boulevard	0425170381 / 9780425170380	June 2000	Gamma Quest trilogy
The Incredible Hulk novels
The Incredible Hulk: What Savage Beast	Peter David	Putnam/BPMC (HC); Berkley Boulevard/BPMC (PB)	0756759676 / 9780756759674 (HC); 1572971355 / 9781572971356 (PB)	July 1995 (HC); July 1996 (PB)	
The Incredible Hulk: Abominations	Jason Henderson	Berkley Boulevard/BPMC	1572972734 / 9781572972735	July 1997	
Fantastic Four novels
Fantastic Four: To Free Atlantis	Nancy A. Collins	Berkley Boulevard/BPMC	1572970545 / 9781572970540	December 1995	
Fantastic Four: Redemption of the Silver Surfer	Michael Jan Friedman	Putnam/BPMC (HC); Berkley Boulevard/BPMC (PB)	039914269X / 9780399142697 (HC); 0425164896 / 9780425164891 (PB)	June 1997 (HC); April 1998 (PB)	
Fantastic Four: Countdown to Chaos	Pierce Askegren	Berkley Boulevard/BPMC	0425163733 / 9780425163733	June 1998	
Daredevil novels
Daredevil: Predator's Smile	Christopher Golden	Berkley Boulevard/BPMC	1572970103 / 9781572970106	April 1996	
Daredevil: The Cutting Edge	Madeleine E. Robins	Berkley Boulevard/BPMC	0425169383 / 9780425169384	June 1999	
Generation X novels
Generation X	Scott Lobdell, Elliot S. Maggin	Berkley Boulevard/BPMC	1572972238 / 9781572972230	June 1997	
Generation X: Crossroads	J. Steven York	Berkley Boulevard/BPMC	0425166317 / 9780425166314	November 1998	
Generation X: Genogoths	J. Steven York	Berkley Boulevard	0425171434 / 9780425171431	September 2000	
X-Men novels
X-Men: Smoke and Mirrors	Eluki Bes Shahar	Berkley Boulevard/BPMC	1572972912 / 9781572972919	September 1997	
X-Men: Empire's End	Diane Duane	Putnam/BPMC (HC); Berkley Boulevard/BPMC (PB)	0399143343 / 9780399143342 (HC); 0425164489 / 9780425164488 (PB)	October 1997 (HC); September 1998 (PB)	
X-Men: The Jewels of Cyttorak	Dean Wesley Smith	Berkley Boulevard/BPMC	1572973293 / 9781572973299	December 1997	
X-Men: Law of the Jungle	Dave Smeds	Berkley Boulevard/BPMC	0425164861 / 9780425164860	March 1998	
X-Men: Prisoner X	Ann Nocenti	Berkley Boulevard/BPMC	0425164934 / 9780425164938	May 1998	
X-Men: Codename Wolverine	Christopher Golden	Putnam/BPMC (HC); Berkley Boulevard/BPMC (PB)	0399144501 / 9780399144509 (HC); 0425171116 / 9780425171110 (PB)	October 1998 (HC); May 2000 (PB)	
X-Men: Soul Killer	Richard Lee Byers	Berkley Boulevard/BPMC	0425167372 / 9780425167373	February 1999	
Other novels
Captain America: Liberty's Torch	Tony Isabella, Bob Ingersoll	Berkley Boulevard/BPMC	0425166198 / 9780425166192	December 1998	
The Avengers and the Thunderbolts	Pierce Askegren	Berkley Boulevard/BPMC	0425166759 / 9780425166758	January 1999	
Nick Fury, Agent of S.H.I.E.L.D.: Empyre	Will Murray	Berkley Boulevard	0425168166 / 9780425168165	August 2000	
The Ultimate short story collections
The Ultimate Spider-Man	Stan Lee (editor)	Berkley Boulevard/BPMC	0425146103 / 9780425146101 (PB); 1572971037 / 9781572971035 (PB)	December 1994 (PB); February 1996 (PB)	Short story collection
The Ultimate Silver Surfer	Stan Lee (editor)	Berkley Boulevard/BPMC	1572970294 / 9781572970298	November 1995	Short story collection
The Ultimate Super-Villains	Stan Lee (editor)	Berkley Boulevard/BPMC	1572971134 / 9781572971134	August 1996	Short story collection
The Ultimate X-Men	Stan Lee (editor)	Berkley Boulevard/BPMC	1572972173 / 9781572972179	October 1996	Short story collection
The Ultimate Hulk	Stan Lee, Peter David (editors)	Berkley Boulevard/BPMC	0425165132 / 9780425165133	October 1998	Short story collection
Other short story collections
Untold Tales of Spider-Man	Stan Lee, Kurt Busiek (editors)	Berkley Boulevard/BPMC	1572972947 / 9781572972940	October 1997	Short story collection; inspired by Untold Tales of Spider-Man comic book series (1995–1997) also written by Busiek
X-Men: Legends	Stan Lee (editor)	Berkley Boulevard	0425170829 / 9780425170823	June 2000	Short story collection

=== Super Thriller ===
Title	Author	Publisher	ISBN	Release Date	Notes
Spider-Man: Midnight Justice	Martin Delrio	Pocket Books/BPMC	0671568515 / 9780671568511	April 1996	Spider-Man Super Thriller #1; young adult novel
Spider-Man: Deadly Cure	Bill McCay	Pocket Books/BPMC	0671003208 / 9780671003203	August 1996	Spider-Man Super Thriller #2; young adult novel
Iron Man: Steel Terror	Dean Wesley Smith	Pocket Books/BPMC	0671003216 / 9780671003210	October 1996	Iron Man Super Thriller; young adult novel
Spider-Man: Global War	Martin Delrio	Pocket Books/BPMC	0671007998 / 9780671007997	January 1997	Spider-Man Super Thriller #3; young adult novel
Spider-Man: Lizard's Rage	Neal Barrett Jr.	Pocket Books/BPMC	067100798X / 9780671007980	February 1997	Spider-Man Super Thriller #4; young adult novel
Spider-Man: Warrior's Revenge	Neal Barrett Jr.	Pocket Books/BPMC	0671008005 / 978-0671008000	August 1997	Spider-Man Super Thriller #5; young adult novel

=== BP Books ===
Title	Author	ISBN	Release Date	Notes
The Chaos Engine
X-Men/Doctor Doom: The Chaos Engine Book One	Steven A. Roman	0613950569 / 978-0613950565 (HC); 0743400194 / 9780743400190 (PB); 0743434838 / 9780743434836 (PB)	July 2000 (HC); July 2000 (PB); August 2001 (PB)	The Chaos Engine trilogy
X-Men/Magneto: The Chaos Engine Book Two	Steven A. Roman	0613950569 / 9780613950565 (HC); 0743400232 / 9780743400237 (PB); 0743445465 / 9780743445467 (PB)	July 2000 (HC); January 2002 (PB); December 2002 (PB)	The Chaos Engine trilogy
X-Men/Red Skull: The Chaos Engine Book Three	Steven A. Roman	0743452801 / 9780743452809 (PB); 0743479580 / 9780743479585 (PB)	December 2002 (PB); October 2003 (PB)	The Chaos Engine trilogy
X-Men: The Legacy Quest
X-Men: The Legacy Quest Book One	Steve Lyons	074344468X / 9780743444682 (PB); 0743458486 / 9780743458481 (PB)	June 2002 (PB); April 2003 (PB)	The Legacy Quest trilogy
X-Men: The Legacy Quest Book Two	Steve Lyons	0743452437 / 9780743452434 (PB); 0743474449 / 9780743474443 (PB)	July 2002 (PB); April 2003 (PB)	The Legacy Quest trilogy
X-Men: The Legacy Quest Book Three	Steve Lyons	0743452666 / 9780743452663 (PB); 0743475194 / 9780743475198 (PB)	October 2002 (PB); September 2003 (PB)	The Legacy Quest trilogy
Other books
X-Men: Shadows of the Past	Michael Jan Friedman	0743400186 / 9780743400183 (HC); 074342378X / 978-0743423786 (PB)	June 2000 (HC); June 2001 (PB)	
Five Decades of the X-Men	Stan Lee (editor)	0743435001 / 9780743435000 (PB); 0743475011 / 9780743475013 (PB)	March 2002 (PB); April 2003 (PB)	Short story collection

=== Marvel Pocket Books Novels ===
Title	Author	Publisher	ISBN	Release Date	Notes
Wolverine: Weapon X	Marc Cerasini	Marvel Press (HC); Pocket Books (PB)	0785116052 / 9780785116059 (HC); 141652164X / 9781416521648 (PB)	November 2004 (HC); October 2005 (PB)	Short lived attempt by Marvel to publish their licensed novels under their own imprint; lasted just 4 releases and was later relaunched under Disney
Fantastic Four: War Zone	Greg Cox	Pocket Books	1416509658 / 9781416509653	July 2005	Short lived attempt by Marvel to publish their licensed novels under their own imprint; lasted just 4 releases and was later relaunched under Disney
Spider-Man: Down These Mean Streets	Keith R.A. DeCandido	Pocket Books	1416509682 / 9781416509684	August 2005	Short lived attempt by Marvel to publish their licensed novels under their own imprint; lasted just 4 releases and was later relaunched under Disney
The X-Men: Dark Mirror	Marjorie M. Liu	Pocket Books	141651063X / 9781416510635	December 2005	Short lived attempt by Marvel to publish their licensed novels under their own imprint; lasted just 4 releases and was later relaunched under Disney
The X-Men: Watchers on the Walls	Christopher L. Bennett	Pocket Books	1416510672 / 9781416510673	April 2006	
Spider-Man: The Darkest Hours	Jim Butcher	Pocket Books	1416510680 / 9781416510680	June 2006	
The Ultimates: Tomorrow Men	Michael Jan Friedman	Pocket Books	1416510656 / 9781416510659	August 2006	Adapted by GraphicAudio on January 27, 2014
Wolverine: Road of Bones	David Mack	Pocket Books	1416510699 / 978-1416510697	October 2006	
Fantastic Four: The Baxter Effect	Dave Stern	Pocket Books	1416510664 / 9781416510666	December 2006	
Wolverine: Lifeblood	Hugh Matthews	Pocket Books	1416510737 / 978-1416510734	February 2007	
X-Men: The Return	Chris Roberson	Pocket Books	1416510753 / 9781416510758	April 2007	
Fantastic Four: What Lies Between	Peter David	Pocket Books	1416510702 / 9781416510703	June 2007	
The Ultimates: Against All Enemies	Alex Irvine	Pocket Books	1416510710 / 9781416510710	August 2007	Adapted by GraphicAudio on April 1, 2014
Wolverine: Violent Tendencies	Marc Cerasini	Pocket Books	1416510745 / 9781416510741	October 2007	
Spider-Man: Drowned in Thunder	Christopher L. Bennett	Pocket Books	1416510729 / 9781416510727	December 2007	Adapted by GraphicAudio in August 2013
Wolverine: The Nature of the Beast	Dave Stern	Pocket Books	141651077X / 9781416510772	April 2008	
Wolverine: Election Day	Peter David	Pocket Books	1416510761 / 9781416510765	August 2008	
Spider-Man: Requiem	Jeff Mariotte	Pocket Books	1416510788 / 9781416510789	October 2008	
Fantastic Four: Doomgate	Jeffrey Lang	Pocket Books	1416540253 / 9781416540250	November 2008	

=== Marvel Press ===
Title	Author	ISBN	Release Date	Notes
Mary Jane
Mary Jane	Judith O'Brien	0785113088 / 9780785113089 (HC); 0785114408 / 9780785114406 (PB)	June 2003 (HC); June 2004 (PB)	Young adult novel
Mary Jane 2	Judith O'Brien	0785114335 / 9780785114338 (HC) [???] (PB)	July 2004 (HC); 2004 (PB)	Young adult novel
Black Widow
Black Widow: Forever Red	Margaret Stohl	978-1484726433 (HC); 978-1484776452 (PB)	October 13, 2015 (HC); September 6, 2016 (PB)	YA Novel
Black Widow: Red Vengeance	Margaret Stohl	978-1484773475 (HC); 978-1484788486 (PB)	October 11, 2016 (HC); April 4, 2017 (PB)	YA novel
Rocket and Groot
Rocket and Groot: Stranded on Planet Strip Mall!	Tom Angleberger	978-1484714522 (HC); 978-1368013925	March 8, 2016 (HC); April 4, 2017 (PB)	
Rocket and Groot: Keep on Truckin'!	Tom Angleberger	978-1484781418	April 4, 2017	
The Unbeatable Squirrel Girl
The Unbeatable Squirrel Girl: Squirrel Meets World	Shannon Hale & Dean Hale	978-1484781548 (HC); 978-1484788523 (PB)	February 7, 2017 (HC); February 6, 2018 (PB)	Children's novel
The Unbeatable Squirrel Girl: 2 Fuzzy, 2 Furious	Shannon Hale & Dean Hale	978-1368011266	March 6, 2018	Children's Novel
Miles Morales
Miles Morales: Spider-Man	Jason Reynolds	978-1484787489	August 1, 2017	YA novel
Miles Morales Suspended	Jason Reynolds	978-1665918466	May 2, 2023	YA novel
Marvel Rebels & Renegades
Loki: Where Mischief Lies	Mackenzie Lee	978-1368022262	September 2, 2019	YA novel
Gamora and Nebula: Sisters in Arms	Mackenzie Lee	978-1368022255	June 1, 2021	YA novel
The Winter Soldier: Cold Front	Mackenzie Lee	978-1368022279	February 7, 2023	YA novel
Black Panther
Black Panther: The Young Prince	Ronald L. Smith	978-1484787649	January 2, 2018	YA novel
Black Panther: Spellbound	Ronald L. Smith	978-1368071246	February 1, 2022	YA novel
Black Panther: Uprising	Ronald L. Smith	978-1368073004	September 6, 2022	YA novel
Other Novels
Spider-Man: Enter Doctor Octopus	Louise A Gikow	0785115870	November 2004 (PB)	
Astonishing X-Men: Gifted	Peter David	978-0785165149	September 12, 2012	Adaptation of the 2004 comic book story arc Gifted within the Astonishing X-Men ongoing series originally written by Joss Whedon. Adapted by GraphicAudio in August 2014.
New Avengers: Breakout	Alisa Kwitney	978-0785165163	January 2, 2013	Adaptation of the 2004 comic book story arc Breakout within the New Avengers ongoing series originally written by Brian Michael Bendis. Adapted by GraphicAudio in October 2014.
Iron Man: Extremis	Marie Javins	978-0785165187	April 16, 2013	Adaptation of the 2005-6 comic book story arc Extremis within the Iron Man ongoing series originally written by Warren Ellis. Adapted by GraphicAudio in June 2014.
The Death of Captain America	Larry Hama	978-0785189961	March 18, 2014	Adaptation of the 2007 comic book story arc The Death of Captain America within the Captain America ongoing series originally written by Ed Brubaker. Adapted by GraphicAudio in December 2014.
Guardians of the Galaxy: Rocket Raccoon and Groot Steal the Galaxy!	Dan Abnett	978-0785189770	July, 2014	Original novel featuring Rocket Raccoon and Groot of the Guardians of the Galaxy, plus Marvel Cosmic elements, written by former Guardians of the Galaxy writer Dan Abnett. Adapted by GraphicAudio in November 2014.
Captain America: Dark Design	Stefan Petrucha	978-0785199854	April 19, 2016	Adapted by GraphicAudio in May 2016
Daredevil: The Man Without Fear	Paul Crilley	978-1302900557	July 19, 2016	Adapted from the 1993 miniseries by Frank Miller and John Romita Jr. Adapted by GraphicAudio in October 2016.
Doctor Strange: The Fate of Dreams	Devin Grayson	978-0785199878	October 18, 2016	YA novel
Iron Man: The Gauntlet	Eoin Colfer	978-1484741603 (HC); 978-1368008518 (PB)	October 25, 2016 (HC); October 24, 2017 (PB)	YA novel
Guardians of the Galaxy: Collect Them All	Corinne Duyvis	978-1302902728	April 18, 2017	YA novel
Hulk: Planet Hulk	Greg Pak	978-1302903251	October 17, 2017	YA novel
Runaways: An Original Novel	Christopher Golden	978-1484782019	January 2, 2018	YA novel
The Unstoppable Wasp: Built On Hope	Sam Maggs	978-1368054652	July 14, 2020	YA novel
Okoye to the People: A Black Panther Novel	Ibi Zoboi	978-1368046978	March 22, 2022	YA novel
Araña and Spider-Man 2099: Dark Tomorrow	Alex Segura	978-1368079006	May 2, 2023	YA novel
Hawkeye: Bishop Takes King	Ashley Poston	978-1368078993	October 3, 2023	YA novel
Captain Marvel: Born to Fly, Destined for the Stars	Sharon Gosling	978-1368106993	August 6, 2024	

=== Titan Books ===
Title	Author	ISBN	Release Date	Notes
Novels of the Marvel Universe
Civil War	Stuart Moore	9781785659584	April 16, 2018	Adaptation of the 2006–07 comic book story arc Civil War originally written by Mark Millar. Adapted by GraphicAudio in March 2013.
Black Panther: Who is the Black Panther?	Jesse J. Holland	9781785659478	April 23, 2018	
The Avengers: Everybody Wants to Rule the World	Dan Abnett	9781785659560	April 23, 2018	Adapted by GraphicAudio in May 2015.
Deadpool: Paws	Stefan Petrucha	9781785659607	April 30, 2018	Adapted by GraphicAudio in November 2015.
Ant-Man: Natural Enemy	Jason Starr	9781785659881	July 30, 2018	Adapted by GraphicAudio in July 2015.
Spider-Man: Hostile Takeover	David Liss	978-1785659768	August 20, 2018	Prequel tie-in novel to Spider-Man video game.
Venom: Lethal Protector	James R. Tuck	978-1789090468	October 23, 2018	Adapted from the 1993 limited series by David Michelinie, Mark Bagley, and Ron Lim.
Spider-Man: Forever Young	Stefan Petrucha	9781785659867	October 29, 2018	Adapted from the 1969–70 Stone Tablet Saga from The Amazing Spider-Man.
Captain Marvel: Liberation Run	Tess Sharpe	978-1789091656	February 26, 2019	
Thanos: Death Sentence	Stuart Moore	9781789092424	April 1, 2019	
Avengers: Infinity	James A. Moore	978-1789091625	April 29, 2019	Adapted from the 2013 limited series by Jonathan Hickman, Jim Cheung, Jerome Opeña, and Dustin Weaver.
X-Men: The Dark Phoenix Saga	Stuart Moore	978-1789090628	May 14, 2019	Adapted from the 1980 story arc by Chris Claremont and John Byrne.
Spider-Man: Kraven's Last Hunt	Neil Kleid	TBA	TBA	Adaptation of the 1987 comic book story arc Kraven's Last Hunt within the Web of Spider-Man, Amazing Spider-Man, and Spectacular Spider-Man ongoing series originally written by J. M. DeMatteis and adapted by Neil Kleid.
X-Men: Days of Future Past	Alexander Irvine	TBA	TBA	Adaptation of the 1980 comic book story arc Days of Future Past within the Uncanny X-Men ongoing series originally written by Chris Claremont. Adapted by GraphicAudio in April 2015.
Captain America: Dark Designs	Stefan Petrucha	TBA	TBA	
Spider-Man: Miles Morales – Wings of Fury	Brittney Morris	TBA	TBA	Prequel to the Spider-Man: Miles Morales video game.
Original Sin	Gavin G. Smith	TBA	TBA	Adaptation of the 2014 Original Sin comic by Jason Aaron and Mike Deodato Jr.
Midnight Suns: Infernal Rising	S.D. Perry	TBA	TBA	Prequel to the Marvel's Midnight Suns video game.
Secret Invasion	Paul Cornell	TBA	TBA	Adaptation of the 2008–09 Secret Invasion comic by Brian Michael Bendis and Leinil Francis Yu.
Loki: Journey Into Mystery	Katherine Locke	TBA	TBA	Adaptation of the 2011–2012 Journey into Mystery comic by Kieron Gillen.
Doctor Strange: Dimension War	James Lovegrove	TBA	TBA	Adaptation of the Doctor Strange comics by Stan Lee and Jack Kirby.
Marvel Original Novels
Morbius: The Living Vampire - Blood Ties	Brendan Deneen	978-1789094855	March 8, 2021	
Black Panther: Tales of Wakanda	Jesse J. Holland (ed.)	9781789095678	March 8, 2021	Short story collection
Black Panther: Panther's Rage	Sheree Renée Thomas	9781803360669	October 10, 2022	
Captain Marvel: Shadow Code	Gilly Segal	9781803361802	October 9, 2023	
Captain America: The Shield of Sam Wilson	Jesse J. Holland (ed.)	9781803363875	January 13, 2025	Short story collection

=== Joe Books Inc. ===
Title	Author	ISBN	Release Date	Notes
The Tales of Asgard Trilogy
Thor: Dueling with Giants	Keith R.A. DeCandido	TBA	December 15, 2015	
Sif: Even Dragons Have Their Endings	Keith R.A. DeCandido	TBA	November 15, 2016	
Warriors Three: Godhood's End	Keith R.A. DeCandido	TBA	May 9, 2017	
Other novels
Captain America: Sub Rosa	David McDonald	TBA	July 12, 2016	
Guardians of the Galaxy: Castaways	David McDonald	TBA	July 12, 2016	
Avengers: The Serpent Society	Pat Shand	TBA	July 25, 2017	
Captain America: The Never-Ending Battle	Robert Greenberger	TBA	November 28, 2017	

=== Serial Box ===
Title	Author	Publisher	ISBN	Release Date	Notes
Thor: Metal Gods	Aaron Stewart-Ahn, Jay Edidin, Brian Keene, Yoon Ha Lee	Serial Box, Open Road Media	TBA	December 12, 2019–March 19, 2020	Released as a serialized ebook and audiobook through Serial Box. Rereleased as an ebook through Open Road Media.
Black Widow: Bad Blood	Lindsay Smith, Margaret Dunlap, Mikki Kendall, L.L. McKinney, Taylor Stevens	Serial Box, Open Road Media	TBA	April 28–July 21, 2020	Released as a serialized ebook and audiobook through Serial Box. Rereleased as an ebook through Open Road Media.
Jessica Jones: Playing with Fire	Lauren Beukes, Vita Ayala, Sam Beckbessinger, Zoe Quinn, Elsa Sjunneson	Serial Box, Open Road Media	TBA	May 28–August 27, 2020	Released as a serialized ebook and audiobook through Serial Box. Rereleased as an ebook through Open Road Media.
Black Panther: Sins of the King	Ira Madison III, Geoffrey Thorne, Tananarive Due, Mohale Mashigo, Steven Barnes	Serial Box, Open Road Media	TBA	November 27–January 28, 2021	Released as a serialized ebook and audiobook through Serial Box. Rereleased as an ebook through Open Road Media.

=== Scholastic ===
Title	Author	ISBN	Release Date	Notes
Shuri: A Black Panther Novel	Nic Stone	978-1338585476	May 5, 2020	Junior novel
Shuri: The Vanished	Nic Stone	978-1338856095	September 6, 2022	Junior novel
Shuri: Symbiosis	Nic Stone	978-1338766554	February 7, 2023	Junior novel

=== Aconyte Books ===
Title	Author	ISBN	Release Date	Notes
Marvel: Legends of Asgard
The Head of Mimir	Richard Lee Byers	TBA	October 6, 2020	
The Sword of Surtur	C L Werner	TBA	January 5, 2021	
The Serpent & The Dead	Anna Stephens	TBA	September 28, 2021	
The Rebels of Vanaheim	Richard Lee Byers	TBA	December 21, 2021	
Three Swords	C L Werner	TBA	March 8, 2022	
Queen of Deception	Anna Stephens	TBA	March 7, 2023	
The Prisoner of Tartarus	Richard Lee Byers	TBA	October 18, 2022	
Marvel Heroines
Domino: Strays	Tristan Palmgren	TBA	October 6, 2020	
Rogue: Untouched	Alisa Kwitney	TBA	May 4, 2021	
Elsa Bloodstone: Bequest	Cath Lauria	TBA	May 4, 2021	
Outlaw: Relentless	Tristan Palmgren	TBA	September 28, 2021	
Black Cat: Discord	Cath Lauria	TBA	March 15, 2022	
Squirrel Girl: Universe	Tristan Palmgren	TBA	September 27, 2022	
Silver Sable: Payback	Cath Lauria	TBA	March 21, 2023	
Mockingbird: Strike Out	Maria Lewis	TBA	June 20, 2023	
Marvel: Xavier's Institute
Liberty and Justice for All	Carrie Harris	TBA	October 6, 2020	
First Team	Robbie MacNiven	TBA	March 2, 2021	
Triptych	Jaleigh Johnson	TBA	September 28, 2021	
School of X	Gwendolyn Nix (ed.)	TBA	December 21, 2021	Short story collection
Marvel: School of X
The Siege of X-41	Tristan Palmgren	TBA	May 17, 2022	
Sound of Light	Amanda Bridgeman	TBA	November 1, 2022	
The Phoenix Chase	Neil Kleid	TBA	May 16, 2023	
Marvel Untold
The Harrowing of Doom	David Annandale	TBA	December 1, 2020	
Reign of the Devourer	David Annandale	TBA	February 1, 2022	
The Tyrant Skies	David Annandale	TBA	April 4, 2023	
Dark Avengers: The Patriot List	David Guymer	TBA	October 12, 2021	
Witches Unleashed	Carrie Harris	TBA	November 9, 2021	
Sisters of Sorcery	Marsheila Rockwell	TBA	September 6, 2022	
Marvel: Crisis Protocol
Target: Kree	Stuart Moore	TBA	July 6, 2021	
Shadow Avengers	Carrie Harris	TBA	May 3, 2022	
Into the Dark Dimension	Stuart Moore	TBA	May 2, 2023	

=== What If? ===
Title	Author	Publisher	ISBN	Release Date	Notes
What If... Loki Was Worthy?	Madeleine Roux	Random House Worlds	TBA	April 2, 2024	
What If... Wanda Maximoff and Peter Parker Were Siblings?	Seanan McGuire	Random House Worlds	TBA	August 27, 2024	
What If... Marc Spector Was A Host To Venom?	Mike Chen	Random House Worlds	TBA	October 22, 2024	
What If... Kitty Pryde Stole the Phoenix Force?	Rebecca Podos	Random House Worlds	TBA	Oct 14, 2025	

=== Marvel Crime ===
Title	Author	Publisher	ISBN	Release Date	Notes
Breaking the Dark: A Jessica Jones Marvel Crime Novel	Lisa Jewell	Hyperion Avenue	978-1368090124	July 2, 2024	
Enemy of My Enemy: A Daredevil Marvel Crime Novel	Alex Segura	Hyperion Avenue	978-1368095365	Sep 23, 2025	
Truth to Power: A Luke Cage Marvel Crime Novel	S. A. Cosby	Hyperion Avenue	978-1368095372	July 28, 2026	

== Other comic book publishers ==
=== Elfquest ===
Title	Author	Publisher	ISBN	Release Date	Related Comics Publisher	Notes
Elfquest: Journey to Sorrow's End	Wendy Pini, Richard Pini	Berkley (PB); Ace (PB)	0425070093 / 9780425070093 (PB); 0441183719 / 9780441183715 (PB)	March 1984 (PB); January 1993 (PB)	WaRP Graphics	Book one of trilogy novelizing original Elfquest comic book series (1978–1984); is followed by Elfquest: The Quest Begins
Elfquest: The Blood of Ten Chiefs	Richard Pini, Robert Asprin, Lynn Abbey (editors)	Father Tree Press and/or(?) Tor Books (HC); Tor Books (PB)	?? (HC); 0812530438 / 9780812530438 (PB)	?? 1986 (HC); December 1987 (PB)	WaRP Graphics	Short story collection; is followed by Elfquest: Wolfsong
Elfquest: Wolfsong	Richard Pini, Robert Asprin, Lynn Abbey (editors)	Tor Books	?? (PB); 0812530373 / 9780812530377 (PB); 0812503775 / 9780812503777 (PB)	?? 1988 (PB); February 1988 (PB); June 1989 (PB)	WaRP Graphics	Elfquest: The Blood of Ten Chiefs #2; short story collection; is followed by Elfquest: Winds of Change
Elfquest: Winds of Change	Richard Pini (editor)	Tor Books	?? (PB); 0812549058 / 9780812549058 (PB); 0812507002 / 9780812507003 (PB)	?? 1989 (PB); February 1989 (PB); April 1990 (PB)	WaRP Graphics	Elfquest: The Blood of Ten Chiefs #3; short story collection; is followed by Elfquest: Against the Wind
Elfquest: Against the Wind	Richard Pini (editor)	Tor Books	?? (PB); 0812522745 / 9780812522747 (PB)	?? 1990 (PB); October 1992 (PB)	WaRP Graphics	Elfquest: The Blood of Ten Chiefs #4; short story collection; is followed by Elfquest: Dark Hours
Elfquest: Dark Hours	Richard Pini (editor)	Tor Books	0812523415 / 9780812523416 (PB); 0812523423 / 9780812523423 (PB)	July 1993 (PB); April 1994 (PB)	WaRP Graphics	Elfquest: The Blood of Ten Chiefs #5; short story collection; sixth volume in series, titled Hunter's Dawn, was planned but never published
Elfquest: The Quest Begins	Wendy Pini, Richard Pini	Ace	0441002943 / 9780441002948 (PB); 0441004180 / 9780441004188 (PB)	January 1996 (PB); February 1997 (PB)	WaRP Graphics	Book two of trilogy novelizing original Elfquest comic book series (1978–1984); is followed by Elfquest: Captives of Blue Mountain
Elfquest: Captives of Blue Mountain	Wendy Pini, Richard Pini	Ace	0441004032 / 9780441004034	March 1997	WaRP Graphics	Book three of trilogy novelizing original Elfquest comic book series (1978–1984)

=== Judge Dredd ===
Title	Author	Publisher	ISBN	Release Date	Related Comics Publisher	Notes
Judge Dredd: Deathmasques	Dave Stone	Virgin Books	ISBN 0-352-32873-8	August 1993	IPC Media (Fleetway) (original publisher)	
Judge Dredd: The Savage Amusement	David Bishop	Virgin Books	ISBN 0-352-32874-6	August 1993	IPC Media (Fleetway) (original publisher)	
Judge Dredd: Dreddlocked	Stephen Marley	Virgin Books	ISBN 0-352-32875-4	October 1993	IPC Media (Fleetway) (original publisher)	
Judge Dredd: Cursed Earth Asylum	David Bishop	Virgin Books	ISBN 0-352-32893-2	December 1993	IPC Media (Fleetway) (original publisher)	
Judge Dredd: The Medusa Seed	Dave Stone	Virgin Books	ISBN 0-352-32895-9	January 1994	IPC Media (Fleetway) (original publisher)	
Judge Dredd: Dread Dominion	Stephen Marley	Virgin Books	ISBN 0-352-32929-7	May 1994	IPC Media (Fleetway) (original publisher)	
Judge Dredd: The Hundredfold Problem	John Grant	Virgin Books	ISBN 0-352-32942-4	August 1994	IPC Media (Fleetway) (original publisher)	Re-released by BeWrite Books in 2003, rewritten as a non-Dredd novel.
Judge Dredd: Silencer	David Bishop	Virgin Books	ISBN 0-352-32960-2	November 1994	IPC Media (Fleetway) (original publisher)	
Judge Dredd: Wetworks	Dave Stone	Virgin Books	ISBN 0-352-32975-0	February 1995	IPC Media (Fleetway) (original publisher)	
Judge Dredd: The Junior Novelisation	Graham Marks	St. Martin's Press	ISBN 0-7522-0671-0	May 1995	IPC Media (Fleetway) (original publisher)	Novelization of 1995 Judge Dredd movie
Judge Dredd	Neal Barrett Jr.	St. Martin's Press	0312956282 / 9780312956288	June 1995	IPC Media (Fleetway) (original publisher)	Novelization of 1995 Judge Dredd movie
Judge Dredd: Dredd vs. Death	Gordon Rennie	Black Flame	ISBN 1-84416-061-0	October 2003	IPC Media (Fleetway) (original publisher)	Novelization of the 2003 video game
Judge Dredd: Bad Moon Rising	David Bishop	Black Flame	ISBN 1-84416-107-2	June 2004	IPC Media (Fleetway) (original publisher)	
Judge Dredd: Black Atlantic	Peter J. Evans & Simon Jowett	Black Flame	ISBN 1-84416-108-0	June 2004	IPC Media (Fleetway) (original publisher)	
Judge Dredd: Eclipse	James Swallow	Black Flame	ISBN 1-84416-122-6	August 2004	IPC Media (Fleetway) (original publisher)	
Judge Dredd: Kingdom of the Blind	David Bishop	Black Flame	ISBN 1-84416-133-1	November 2004	IPC Media (Fleetway) (original publisher)	
Judge Dredd: The Final Cut	Matt Smith	Black Flame	ISBN 1-84416-135-8	February 2005	IPC Media (Fleetway) (original publisher)	
Judge Dredd: Swine Fever	Andrew Cartmel	Black Flame	ISBN 1-84416-174-9	May 2005	IPC Media (Fleetway) (original publisher)	
Judge Dredd: Whiteout	James Swallow	Black Flame	ISBN 1-84416-219-2	September 2005	IPC Media (Fleetway) (original publisher)	
Judge Dredd: Psykogeddon	Dave Stone	Black Flame	ISBN 1-84416-321-0	January 2006	IPC Media (Fleetway) (original publisher)	
Judge Dredd: City Fathers	Matthew Smith	Rebellion Publishing	TBA	August 2012	IPC Media (Fleetway) (original publisher)	Judge Dredd: Year One
Judge Dredd: The Cold Light of Day	Michael Carroll	Rebellion Publishing	TBA	July 2014	IPC Media (Fleetway) (original publisher)	Judge Dredd: Year One
Judge Dredd: Wear Iron	Al Ewing	Rebellion Publishing	TBA	October 2014	IPC Media (Fleetway) (original publisher)	Judge Dredd: Year One
Judge Dredd: The Righteous Man	Michael Carroll	Rebellion Publishing	TBA	January 2016	IPC Media (Fleetway) (original publisher)	Judge Dredd: Year Two
Judge Dredd: Down and Out	Matthew Smith	Rebellion Publishing	TBA	September 2016	IPC Media (Fleetway) (original publisher)	Judge Dredd: Year Two
Judge Dredd: Alternative Facts	Cavan Scott	Rebellion Publishing	TBA	October 2017	IPC Media (Fleetway) (original publisher)	Judge Dredd: Year Two
Judge Dredd: Fallen Angel	Michael Carroll	Rebellion Publishing	TBA	August 26, 2020	IPC Media (Fleetway) (original publisher)	Judge Dredd: Year Three
Judge Dredd: Machineries of Hate	Matthew Smith	Rebellion Publishing	TBA	October 21, 2020	IPC Media (Fleetway) (original publisher)	Judge Dredd: Year Three
Judge Dredd: Bitter Earth	Lauren Sills	Rebellion Publishing	TBA	December 16, 2020	IPC Media (Fleetway) (original publisher)	Judge Dredd: Year Three
Apocalypse War Book 1: Pack Instinct	John Ware	Rebellion Publishing	TBA	August 10, 2022	IPC Media (Fleetway) (original publisher)	Apocalypse War Dossier
Apocalypse War Book 2: The World Will End Today	John Ware	Rebellion Publishing	TBA	August 10, 2022	IPC Media (Fleetway) (original publisher)	Apocalypse War Dossier
Apocalypse War Book 3: The Bloody Fist of Justice	John Ware	Rebellion Publishing	TBA	August 10, 2022	IPC Media (Fleetway) (original publisher)	Apocalypse War Dossier

=== Teenage Mutant Ninja Turtles ===
Title	Author	Publisher	ISBN	Release Date	Related Comics Publisher	Notes
Teenage Mutant Ninja Turtles	B. B. Hiller	Dell Publishing	044080146X / 978-0440801467	1990	Mirage Studios	Novelization of the 1990 film of the same name.
Teenage Mutant Ninja Turtles	Dave Morris	Bantam	0553403583 / 978-0553403589	1990	Mirage Studios	Novelization of the 1990 film of the same name.
Teenage Mutant Ninja Turtles II: The Secret of the Ooze	B. B. Hiller	Dell Publishing	9780440404514 / 0440404517	1991	Mirage Studios	Novelization of the 1991 film of the same name.
Teenage Mutant Ninja Turtles III	B. B. Hiller	Dell Publishing	9780440408000 / 0440408008	1993	Mirage Studios	Novelization of the 1993 film of the same name.
Teenage Mutant Ninja Turtles: Special Edition Movie Novelization	Victoria Shelley	Random House Books for Young Readers	9780553511109 / 0553511106	2014	Mirage Studios	Novelization of the 2014 Teenage Mutant Ninja Turtles film.
Teenage Mutant Ninja Turtles: Out of the Shadows - The Deluxe Movie Novelization	David Lewman	Random House	9781101939192 / 1101939192; 9781474864473 / 1474864473 (UK release by Parragon Books.)	2016	Mirage Studios	Novelization of the 2016 film of the same name.
Teenage Mutant Ninja Turtles: Out of the Shadows - The Movie Novelization	David Lewman	Random House	9780399556944 / 039955694X	2016	Mirage Studios	Novelization of the 2016 film of the same name.
Teenage Mutant Ninja Turtles: Out of the Shadows Junior Novelization	David Lewman	Random House	9780606388863 / 0606388869	2016	Mirage Studios	Novelization of the 2016 film of the same name.
Teenage Mutant Ninja Turtles: Mutant Mayhem: The Junior Novelization	David Lewman	Random House	0593647114 / 978-0593647110	2023	Mirage Studios	Novelization of the 2023 film of the same name.

=== Hellboy ===
Title	Author	Publisher	ISBN	Release Date	Related Comics Publisher	Notes
Hellboy: The Lost Army	Christopher Golden	Dark Horse Books	TBA	1997	Dark Horse Comics	
Hellboy: Odd Jobs	Christopher Golden (ed.)	Turtleback,	TBA	December 15, 1999	Dark Horse Comics	Writers: Stephen R. Bissette, Greg Rucka, Nancy A. Collins, and Poppy Z. Brite
Hellboy: The Bones of Giants	Christopher Golden	Dark Horse Books	TBA	December 5, 2001	Dark Horse Comics	
Hellboy: Odder Jobs	Christopher Golden (ed.)	Dark Horse Books	TBA	October 6, 2004	Dark Horse Comics	Writers: Frank Darabont, Guillermo del Toro, Charles de Lint, Graham Joyce, Sharyn McCrumb, James Cambias, and Richard Dean Starr
Hellboy: On Earth As It Is In Hell	Brian Hodge	Pocket Books	9781416524113	September 2005	Dark Horse Comics	
Hellboy: Unnatural Selection	Tim Lebbon	Pocket Books	9781416534679	March 2006	Dark Horse Comics	
Hellboy: The God Machine	Thomas E. Sniegoski	Pocket Books	9781416547433	July 2006	Dark Horse Comics	
Hellboy: The Dragon Pool	Christopher Golden	Pocket Books	9781416553892	March 2007	Dark Horse Comics	
Hellboy: Emerald Hell	Tom Piccirilli	Dark Horse Books	978-1595821416	February 2008	Dark Horse Comics	
Hellboy: The All-Seeing Eye	Mark Morris	Dark Horse Books	978-1595821423	October 2008	Dark Horse Comics	
Hellboy: Oddest Jobs	Christopher Golden (ed.)	Dark Horse Books	978-1593079444	July 2008	Dark Horse Comics	Writers: Joe R. Lansdale, China Miéville, Barbara Hambly, Ken Bruen, Amber Benson, and Tad Williams
Hellboy: The Fire Wolves	Tim Lebbon	Dark Horse Books	978-1595822048	April 2009	Dark Horse Comics	
Lobster Johnson: The Satan Factory	Thomas E. Sniegoski	Dark Horse Books	978-1595822031	July 22, 2009	Dark Horse Comics	
Hellboy: The Ice Wolves	Mark Chadbourn	Dark Horse Books	978-1595822055	September 2009	Dark Horse Comics	
Hellboy: An Assortment of Horrors	Christopher Golden (ed.)	Dark Horse Books	978-1506703435	April 29, 2017	Dark Horse Comics	
Novelizations
Hellboy	Yvonne Navarro	Simon & Schuster	978-0743497312	February 23, 2004	Dark Horse Comics	Novelization of the 2004 Hellboy film
Hellboy II: The Golden Army	Robert Greenberger	Dark Horse Books	978-1593079543	June 17, 2008	Dark Horse Comics	

=== Witchblade ===
Title	Author	Publisher	ISBN	Release Date	Related Comics Publisher	Notes
Witchblade: Talons	John DeChancie	iBooks	074343501X / 9780743435017	January 2002	Image Comics (Top Cow)	
Witchblade: A Terrible Beauty	John J. Miller	iBooks	0743452348 / 9780743452342	July 2002	Image Comics (Top Cow)	
Witchblade: Demons	Mike Baron	iBooks	0743445201 / 9780743445207	December 2002	Image Comics (Top Cow)	
Witchblade Combo	John J. Miller, John DeChancie	iBooks	1416504052 / 9781416504054	January 2005	Image Comics (Top Cow)	Includes Witchblade: Talons by DeChancie and Witchblade: A Terrible Beauty by Miller

=== Rising Stars ===
Title	Author	Publisher	ISBN	Release Date	Related Comics Publisher	Notes
Rising Stars Book One: Born in Fire	Arthur Byron Cover	iBooks	0743435125 / 9780743435123	June 2002	Image Comics (Top Cow)	Novelization trilogy of Rising Stars comic book series (1999–2005)
Rising Stars Book Two: Ten Years After	Arthur Byron Cover	iBooks	0743452763 / 9780743452762	November 2002	Image Comics (Top Cow)	Novelization trilogy of Rising Stars comic book series (1999–2005)
Rising Stars Book Three: Change the World	Arthur Byron Cover	iBooks	141650432X / 9781416504320	September 2005	Image Comics (Top Cow)	Novelization trilogy of Rising Stars comic book series (1999–2005)

=== The Walking Dead ===
Title	Author	Publisher	ISBN	Release Date	Related Comics Publisher	Notes
The Walking Dead: Rise of the Governor	Robert Kirkman and Jay Bonansinga	St. Martin's Publishing Group	9780312547738	October 11, 2011	Image Comics	
The Walking Dead: The Road to Woodbury	Robert Kirkman and Jay Bonansinga	St. Martin's Publishing Group	9780312547745	October 16, 2012	Image Comics	
A Walking Dead Short: Just Another Day at the Office	Robert Kirkman and Jay Bonansinga	St. Martin's Publishing Group	9781466831964	December 8, 2012	Image Comics	
The Walking Dead: The Fall of the Governor Part One	Robert Kirkman and Jay Bonansinga	St. Martin's Publishing Group	9781250020642	October 8, 2013	Image Comics	
The Walking Dead: The Fall of the Governor Part Two	Robert Kirkman and Jay Bonansinga	St. Martin's Publishing Group	9781447266822	March 13, 2014	Image Comics	
The Walking Dead: Descent	Jay Bonansinga	St. Martin's Publishing Group	9781250057174	October 14, 2014	Image Comics	
The Walking Dead: Invasion	Jay Bonansinga	St. Martin's Publishing Group	9781250058508	October 6, 2015	Image Comics	
The Walking Dead: Search and Destroy	Jay Bonansinga	St. Martin's Publishing Group	9781250058515	October 18, 2016	Image Comics	
The Walking Dead: Return to Woodbury	Jay Bonansinga	St. Martin's Publishing Group	9781250058522	October 17, 2017	Image Comics	
The Walking Dead: Typhoon	Wesley Chu	St. Martin's Publishing Group	9781508297116	October 1, 2019	Image Comics	

=== Others ===
Title	Author	Publisher	ISBN	Release Date	Related Comics Publisher	Notes
The Rocketeer	Peter David	Bantam Books	0553293222 / 9780553293227	June 1991	Pacific Comics (original publisher)	Novelization of 1991 The Rocketeer movie
Spawn	Rob MacGregor	Avon	0380794411 / 9780380794416	September 1997	Image Comics (Todd McFarlane)	Novelization of 1997 Spawn movie
Sable	Mike Grell	Forge (HC); Tor Books (PB)	0312848722 / 9780312848729 (HC); 0812565509 / 9780812565508 (PB)	July 2000 (HC); July 2001 (PB)	First Comics (original publisher)	
The Darkness	Kerri Hawkins	Top Cow	0743445201 / 9781582408330	July 2007	Image Comics (Top Cow)	
G.I. Joe: Tales from the Cobra Wars	Max Brooks, Chuck Dixon, Matt Forbeck, Jon McGoran, Jonathan Maberry, John Skipp & Cody Goodfellow, Duane Swierczynski, Dennis Tafoya (w) Gabriele Dell’Otto	IDW Publishing	978-1-60010-881-5	April 2011	IDW Publishing	Includes eight short stories based on IDW's G.I. Joe comics
Giant Days	Non Pratt	Amulet Books	978-1-41973-126-6 (HC) / 978-1-41973-733-6 (PB)	August 21, 2018 (HC) / September 10, 2019 (PB)		Based on the Giant Days comic book series
The Umbrella Academy: Young Blood	Alyssa Sheinmel	Abrams, Incorporated	978-1419766275	July 9, 2024	Dark Horse Comics	Prequel to the Netflix series

== Newspaper comic strip characters ==
=== Buck Rodgers ===
Title	Author	Publisher	ISBN	Release Date	Notes
Buck Rogers in the 25th Century A.D.	Phil Nowlan, Dick Calkins	Whitman Publishing	None	?? 1933	Buck Rogers first appeared (as "Anthony Rogers") in Nowlan's Armageddon 2419 A.D. novella in the August 1928 issue of Amazing Stories magazine; this 1933 novella retells the origin of Buck Rogers; (the comic strip premiered January 7, 1929)
Buck Rogers: Armageddon 2419 A.D.	Philip Francis Nowlan	Ace Books	None	?? 1962	Reprints Nowlan's Armageddon 2419 A.D. and The Airlords of Han novellas (from the August 1928 and March 1929 issues of Amazing Stories magazine)
Buck Rogers: A Life in the Future	Martin Caidin	TSR	0786901446 / 9780786901449 (HC)	September 1995	First edition also includes a reprint of the 1933 Buck Rogers in the 25th Century A.D. novella by Philip Francis Nowlan and Dick Calkins
Novelizations
Buck Rogers in the 25th Century	Addison E. Steele (Richard A. Lupoff)	Dell Publishing	0440108438 / 9780440108436	November 1978	Novelization of the Buck Rogers in the 25th Century pilot film (1979)
Buck Rogers 2: That Man on Beta	Addison E. Steele (Richard A. Lupoff)	Dell Publishing	0440109485 / 9780440109488	January 1979	Based on Buck Rogers in the 25th Century television series (1979–1980); adapted from an unproduced television episode script
Buck Rogers XXVC
Buck Rogers: Arrival	Abigail Irvine, M.S. Murdock, Jerry Oltion, Ulrike O'Reilly, Robert Sheckley	TSR	0880385820 / 9780880385824	May 1989	Short story collection; first book by TSR tying into their Buck Rogers XXVC game setting
Buck Rogers: Rebellion 2456	M.S. Murdock	TSR	0880387289 / 9780880387286	June 1989	The Martian Wars Trilogy
Buck Rogers: Hammer of Mars	M.S. Murdock	TSR	0880387513 / 9780880387514	October 1989	The Martian Wars Trilogy
Buck Rogers: Armageddon Off Vesta	M.S. Murdock	TSR	0880387610 / 9780880387613	November 1989	The Martian Wars Trilogy
Buck Rogers: First Power Play	John Miller	TSR	0880388404 / 9780880388405	October 1990	The Inner Planets Trilogy
Buck Rogers: Prime Squared	M.S. Murdock	TSR	0880388633 / 9780880388634	November 1990	The Inner Planets Trilogy
Buck Rogers: Matrix Cubed	Britton Bloom	TSR	0880388854 / 9780880388856	May 1991	The Inner Planets Trilogy
Buck Rogers: The Genesis Web	C.M. Brennan	TSR	1560760931 / 9781560760931	May 1992	The Invaders of Charon Trilogy
Buck Rogers: Nomads of the Sky	William H. Keith Jr.	TSR	1560760982 / 9781560760986	October 1992	The Invaders of Charon Trilogy
Buck Rogers: Warlords of Jupiter	William H. Keith Jr.	TSR	1560765763 / 978-1560765769	March 1993	The Invaders of Charon Trilogy

=== Flash Gordon ===
Title	Author	Publisher	ISBN	Release Date	Notes
Flash Gordon in the Caverns of Mongo	Alex Raymond	Grosset & Dunlap	None	?? 1936	
Avon Flash Gordon
Flash Gordon: The Lion Men of Mongo	Alex Raymond, Con Steffanson	Avon	0380185156 / 9780380185153	?? 1974	Avon Flash Gordon series #1
Flash Gordon: The Plague of Sound	Alex Raymond, Con Steffanson	Avon	0380191660 / 9780380191666	?? 1974	Avon Flash Gordon series #2
Flash Gordon: The Space Circus	Alex Raymond, Con Steffanson	Avon	0380000644 / 9780380000647	?? 1974	Avon Flash Gordon series #3
Flash Gordon: The Time Trap of Ming XIII	Alex Raymond, Con Steffanson	Avon	038000111X / 9780380001118	?? 1974	Avon Flash Gordon series #4
Flash Gordon: The Witch Queen of Mongo	Alex Raymond, Con Steffanson	Avon	0380001802 / 9780380001804	December 1974	Avon Flash Gordon series #5
Flash Gordon: The War of the Cybernauts	Alex Raymond, Carson Bingham	Avon	038000206X / 9780380002061	?? 1975	Avon Flash Gordon series #6
Tempo Flash Gordon
Flash Gordon: Massacre in the 22nd Century	David Hagberg	Grosset & Dunlap		?? 1980	Tempo Flash Gordon series #1
Flash Gordon: War of the Citadels	David Hagberg	Ace Books	0448172151 / 9780448172156	October 1980	Tempo Flash Gordon series #2
Flash Gordon: Crisis on Citadel II	David Hagberg	Ace Books	0448172313 / 9780448172316	December 1980	Tempo Flash Gordon series #3
Flash Gordon: Forces from the Federation	David Hagberg	Ace Books	044817233X / 9780448172330	January 1981	Tempo Flash Gordon series #4
Flash Gordon: Citadels Under Attack	David Hagberg	Ace Books	0448172348 / 9780448172347	August 1981	Tempo Flash Gordon series #5
Flash Gordon: Citadels on Earth	David Hagberg	Ace Books	0448172542 / 9780448172545	July 1981	Tempo Flash Gordon series #6
Novelization
Flash Gordon	Arthur Byron Cover	Jove	0515058483 / 9780515058482	December 1980	Novelization of the 1980 Flash Gordon movie

=== The Phantom ===
Title	Author	Publisher	ISBN	Release Date	Notes
The Son of the Phantom	Dale Robertson	Whitman Publishing	None	?? 1946	The Phantom novels page gives 1944 as the publishing date (Amazon gives 1946).
The Phantom	Rob MacGregor	Avon	038078887X / 9780380788873	July 1996	Novelization of the 1996 The Phantom movie
The Phantom Chronicles: New Tales of the Ghost Who Walks!		Moonstone Books	1933076216 / 978-1933076218	October 2007	Short story collection
Avon The Phantom
The Story of the Phantom: The Ghost Who Walks	Lee Falk	Avon		?? 1972	Avon Phantom series #1
The Story of the Phantom: The Slave Market of Mucar	Lee Falk, Basil Copper	Avon		?? 1972	Avon Phantom series #2
The Story of the Phantom: The Scorpia Menace	Lee Falk, Basil Copper	Avon		?? 1972	Avon Phantom series #3
The Story of the Phantom: The Veiled Lady	Lee Falk, Frank S. Shawn*	Avon		?? 1973	Avon Phantom series #4; *pseudonym for Ron Goulart
The Story of the Phantom: The Golden Circle	Lee Falk, Frank S. Shawn	Avon		?? 1973	Avon Phantom series #5
The Story of the Phantom: The Mysterious Ambassador	Lee Falk	Avon		July 1973	Avon Phantom series #6
The Story of the Phantom: The Mystery of the Sea Horse	Lee Falk, Frank S. Shawn	Avon	038001422X / 9780380014224	August 1973	Avon Phantom series #7
The Story of the Phantom: The Hydra Monster	Lee Falk, Frank S. Shawn	Avon	0380012758 / 9780380012756	?? 1973	Avon Phantom series #8
The Story of the Phantom: Killer's Town	Lee Falk	Avon		?? 1973	Avon Phantom series #9
The Story of the Phantom: The Goggle-Eyed Pirates	Lee Falk, Frank S. Shawn	Avon		?? 1974	Avon Phantom series #10
The Story of the Phantom: The Swamp Rats	Lee Falk, Frank S. Shawn	Avon		?? 1974	Avon Phantom series #11
The Story of the Phantom: The Vampires and the Witch	Lee Falk, Frank S. Shawn	Avon	0380000342 / 9780380000340	?? 1974	Avon Phantom series #12
The Story of the Phantom: The Island of Dogs	Lee Falk, Warren Shanahan	Avon	0380002434 / 9780380002436	?? 1975	Avon Phantom series #13
The Story of the Phantom: The Assassins	Lee Falk, Carson Bingham	Avon	0380002981 / 9780380002986	?? 1975	Avon Phantom series #14
The Story of the Phantom: The Curse of the Two-Headed Bull	Lee Falk	Avon	0380003813 / 9780380003815	?? 1975	Avon Phantom series #15

=== Dick Tracy ===
Title	Author	Publisher	ISBN	Release Date	Notes
Dick Tracy and the Woo Woo Sisters	Chester Gould	Dell	None	?? 1947	
Dick Tracy	Max Allan Collins	Bantam	0553285289 / 9780553285284	May 1990	Novelization of 1990 Dick Tracy movie
Dick Tracy: The Secret Files	Max Allan Collins, Martin H. Greenberg (editors)	Tor Books	0812510100 / 9780812510102	June 1990	Short story collection
Dick Tracy	William Johnston	Berkley	0425127427 / 9780425127421	August 1990	
Dick Tracy Goes to War	Max Allan Collins	Bantam	0553288903 / 9780553288902	February 1991	

=== Others ===
Title	Author	Publisher	ISBN	Release Date	Notes
Blondie and Dagwood's Footlight Folly	Chic Young	Dell	None	?? 1947	

== See also ==
- Lists of media based on comics
  - List of films based on comics
  - List of video games based on comics
  - List of television programs based on comics
- Spider-Man in literature
