= Black Panther collected editions =

List of Black Panther comics collated into collected editions

The Marvel Comics character Black Panther first appeared in 1966 in Fantastic Four #52 (April 1966), written by Stan Lee and drawn by Jack Kirby.

The character's various appearances have been collated into hundreds of trade paperback, hardcover and omnibus collections.

== Omnibus ==
Title	Material collected	Date published	ISBN
Black Panther: The Early Marvel Years Omnibus	Fantastic Four (vol. 1) #52–53, 56, 119, Captain America (vol. 1) #100, Avengers (vol. 1) #52, 62, 73–74, 77–79, 87, 112, 126, Daredevil (vol. 1) #52, 69, Daredevil Annual (vol. 1) #4, Marvel Team-Up #20, Jungle Action #6–24, material from Fantastic Four (vol. 1) #54, Tales of Suspense #97–99, Astonishing Tales #6-7	October 18, 2022	978-1302945084
Black Panther: Panther's Prey Omnibus	Black Panther #1–15, Marvel Premiere #51–53, Black Panther (vol. 2) #1–4, Black Panther: Panther's Prey #1–4, material from Marvel Team-Up #100, Marvel Comics Presents #13–37, 148; Solo Avengers #19, Marvel Super Heroes (vol. 2) #1, Marvel Fanfare #60, Fantastic Four Unlimited #1	February 10, 2026	978-1302967659
Black Panther By Christopher Priest Omnibus Vol. 1	Black Panther (vol. 3) #1–33, Deadpool (vol. 2) #44, material from Marvel Double-Shot #2	December 6, 2022	978-1302945015
Black Panther By Christopher Priest Omnibus Vol. 2	Black Panther (vol. 3) #34–62, Incredible Hulk (vol. 3) #33, Thor #370, The Crew #1–7	February 20, 2024	978-1302953683
Black Panther By Reginald Hudlin Omnibus	Black Panther (vol. 4) #1–41, Annual #1; X-Men (vol. 2) #175–176, Black Panther (vol. 5) #1–6, Black Panther/Captain America: Flags of Our Fathers #1–4, Black Panther Saga, material from Black Panther Annual (vol. 7) #1	March 11, 2025	978-1302963484
Black Panther By Ta-Nehisi Coates Omnibus	Black Panther (vol. 6) #1–18, 166–172, Black Panther (vol. 7) #1–22, material from #23–25	October 18, 2022	978-1302945695
Wakanda: World of Black Panther Omnibus	Rise of the Black Panther #1–6, Black Panther: World of Wakanda #1–6, Black Panther & The Crew #1–6, Black Panther: Long Live the King #1–6, Black Panther Annual (vol. 7) #1, Amazing Spider-Man: Wakanda Forever, X-Men: Wakanda Forever, Avengers: Wakanda Forever, Black Panther vs. Deadpool #1–5, Shuri #1–10, Kilmonger #1–5, Black Panther and the Agents of Wakanda #1–8, King in Black: Black Panther, The Last Annihilation: Wakanda, material from Venomverse: War Stories, Marvel Comics #1000, Marvel's Voices #1, Marvel's Voices: Legacy, Black Panther (vol. 7) #23–25	October 4, 2022	978-1302946272

== Marvel Masterworks ==
Title	Material collected	Date published	ISBN
Marvel Masterworks: Black Panther Volume 1	Jungle Action #6–22, 24	2010	978-0785141990
Marvel Masterworks: Black Panther Volume 2	Black Panther (vol. 1) #1–15, Marvel Premiere #51–53, material from Marvel Team-Up #100	2016	978-1302900205
Marvel Masterworks: Black Panther Volume 3	Black Panther (vol. 2) #1–4, and material from Marvel Comics Presents #13–37	April 2021	978-1302928698

== Epic Collections ==
Title	Material collected	Date published	ISBN
Black Panther Epic Collection Volume 1: Panther's Rage	Fantastic Four (vol. 1) #52–53, Jungle Action #6–22, 24	2016	978-1302901905
Black Panther Epic Collection Volume 2: Revenge of the Black Panther	Black Panther (vol. 1) #1–15, Marvel Premiere #51–53, Black Panther (vol. 2) #1–4, material from Marvel Team-Up #100	2019	978-1302915421
Black Panther Epic Collection Volume 3: Panther's Prey	Black Panther: Panther's Prey #1–4, material from Marvel Comics Presents #13–37, 148, Solo Avengers #19, Marvel Super Heroes (vol. 2) #1, Marvel Fanfare #60, Fantastic Four Unlimited #1	2021	978-1302921989

== Volume 1 ==
Title	Material collected	Date published	ISBN
Black Panther by Jack Kirby Volume 1	Black Panther (vol. 1) #1–7	2005	978-0785116875
Black Panther by Jack Kirby Volume 2	Black Panther (vol. 1) #8–13	2006	978-0785120698

== Miniseries ==
Title	Material collected	Date published	ISBN
Black Panther: Panther's Quest	Material from Marvel Comics Presents #13–37	2018	978-1302908034

== Volume 3 ==
Title	Material collected	Date published	ISBN
Black Panther Vol. 1: The Client	Black Panther (vol. 3) #1–5	2001	978-0785107897
Black Panther Vol. 2: Enemy of the State	Black Panther (vol. 3) #6–12	2002	978-0785108290
Black Panther by Christopher Priest: The Complete Collection Volume 1	Black Panther (vol. 3) #1–17	2015	978-0785192671
Black Panther by Christopher Priest: The Complete Collection Volume 2	Black Panther (vol. 3) #18–35, Deadpool (vol. 3) #44	2015	978-0785198116
Black Panther by Christopher Priest: The Complete Collection Volume 3	Black Panther (vol. 3) #36–49, 57–58, Incredible Hulk (vol. 3) #33, Thor (vol. 1) #370, material from Marvel Double-Shot #2	2016	978-0785195085
Black Panther by Christopher Priest: The Complete Collection Volume 4	Black Panther (vol. 3) #50–56, 59–62, The Crew #1–7	2016	978-1302900588

== Volume 4 ==
Title	Material collected	Date published	ISBN
Black Panther: Who is the Black Panther?	Black Panther (vol. 4) #1–6	2006	978-0785120483
House of M: World of M featuring Wolverine	Black Panther (vol. 4) #7 and Wolverine (vol. 3) #33–35, Captain America (vol. 5) #10, The Pulse #10	2006	978-0785119227
X-Men/Black Panther: Wild Kingdom	Black Panther (vol. 4) #8–9, X-Men (vol. 2) #175–176	2006	978-0785117896
Black Panther: Bad Mutha	Black Panther (vol. 4) #10–13	2006	978-0785117506
Black Panther: The Bride	Black Panther (vol. 4) #14–18	2006	978-0785121077
Black Panther: Civil War	Black Panther (vol. 4) #19–25	2007	978-0785122357
Black Panther: Four the Hard Way	Black Panther (vol. 4) #26–30	2007	978-0785126553
Black Panther: Little Green Men	Black Panther (vol. 4) #31–34	2008	978-0785126577
Black Panther: Back to Africa	Black Panther (vol. 4) #35–38, Annual #1	2008	978-0785124528
Black Panther: Secret Invasion	Black Panther (vol. 4) #39–41	2008	978-0785133971
Black Panther by Reginald Hudlin: The Complete Collection Vol. 1	Black Panther (vol. 4) #1–18, X-Men (vol. 2) #175–176	2017	978-1302907716
Black Panther by Reginald Hudlin: The Complete Collection Vol. 2	Black Panther (vol. 4) #19–34, Annual #1	2018	978-1302909475
Black Panther by Reginald Hudlin: The Complete Collection Vol. 3	Black Panther (vol. 4) #35–41, Black Panther (vol. 5) #1–6, Black Panther/Captain America: Flags of Our Fathers #1–4, Black Panther Saga	2018	978-1302910358
Miscellaneous
Captain America/Black Panther: Flags of our Fathers	Captain America/Black Panther: Flags of our Fathers #1–4, Rise of The Black Panther #1	July 2018	978-1302914202
Marvel Knights 2099	Marvel Knights 2099: Black Panther #1 and Marvel Knights 2099: Daredevil #1, Marvel Knights 2099: Inhumans #1, Marvel Knights 2099: Punisher #1, Marvel Knights 2099: Mutant #1	January 2005	978-0785116134

== Volume 5 ==
Title	Material collected	Date published	ISBN
Black Panther: The Deadliest of the Species	Black Panther (vol. 5) #1–6	2009	978-0785133421
Black Panther: Power	Black Panther (vol. 5) #7–12	2010	978-0785138617
Miscellaneous
Doomwar	Doomwar #1–6	2011	978-0785147152
Klaws of the Panther	Klaws of the Panther #1–4	March 2011	978-0785151180
Black Panther: Doomwar	Black Panther (vol. 5) #7–12, Doomwar #1–6, Klaws of the Panther #1–4, material from Age of Heroes #4	2017	978-1302904166
Black Panther: The Saga of Shuri & T'Challa	Black Panther (vol. 4) #2, Black Panther (vol. 5) #1–6, Klaws of the Panther #1–4, Black Panther (vol. 6) #1 and #8–11, and Black Panther: Long Live the King #1–6	August 2022	978-1302946005

== The Man Without Fear/The Most Dangerous Man Alive ==
Title	Material collected	Date published	ISBN
Black Panther: The Man Without Fear - Urban Jungle	Black Panther: The Man Without Fear #513–518, material from X-Men: Curse of the Mutants Spotlight	2011	978-0785145233
Black Panther: The Man Without Fear - Fear Itself	Black Panther: The Man Without Fear #519–523, Black Panther: The Most Dangerous Man Alive #524	2012	978-0785152064
Black Panther: The Most Dangerous Man Alive - The Kingpin of Wakanda	Black Panther: The Most Dangerous Man Alive #523.1, 525–529	2012	978-0785160373
Black Panther: The Man Without Fear – The Complete Collection	Black Panther: The Man Without Fear #513–523, Black Panther: The Most Dangerous Man Alive #523.1, 524–529	2018	978-1302907723

== Volume 6 ==
Title	Material collected	Date published	ISBN
Paperback
A Nation Under Our Feet Book 1	Black Panther (vol. 6) #1–4, Fantastic Four (vol. 1) #52	September 13, 2016	978-1302900533
A Nation Under Our Feet Book 2	Black Panther (vol. 6) #5–8	January 24, 2017	978-1302900540
A Nation Under Our Feet Book 3	Black Panther (vol. 6) #9–12	April 25, 2017	978-1302901912
Book 4: Avengers of the New World Part 1	Black Panther (vol. 6) #13–18	November 21, 2017	978-1302906498
Book 5: Avengers of the New World Part 2	Black Panther (vol. 6) #166–172	June 12, 2018	978-1302909888
Oversized hardcover
Vol. 1: A Nation Under Our Feet	Black Panther (vol. 6) #1–12	August 15, 2017	978-1302904159
Vol. 2: Avengers of the New World	Black Panther (vol. 6) #13–18, 166–172	November 27, 2018	978-1302908959
Miscellaneous
World of Wakanda	Black Panther: World of Wakanda #1–6	June 27, 2017	978-1302906504
Black Panther & the Crew: We Are the Streets	Black Panther & the Crew #1–6	October 31, 2017	978-1302908324
Black Panther: Long Live the King	Black Panther: Long Live the King #1–6	June 5, 2018	978-1302905385
Rise of the Black Panther	Rise of the Black Panther #1–6	August 14, 2018	978-1302908843
Wakanda Forever	Amazing Spider-Man: Wakanda Forever; X-Men: Wakanda Forever; Avengers: Wakanda Forever; Black Panther Annual (vol. 2) #1	November 6, 2018	978-1302913588
Black Panther vs. Deadpool	Black Panther vs. Deadpool #1–5	May 2, 2019	978-1846539671

== Volume 7 ==
Title	Material collected	Date published	ISBN
Paperback
Black Panther Book 6: The Intergalactic Empire of Wakanda Part 1	Black Panther (vol. 7) #1–6	February 5, 2019	978-1302912932
Black Panther Book 7: The Intergalactic Empire of Wakanda Part 2	Black Panther (vol. 7) #7–12	August 6, 2019	978-1302912949
Black Panther Book 8: The Intergalactic Empire of Wakanda Part 3	Black Panther (vol. 7) #13–18	December 24, 2019	978-1302914462
Black Panther Book 9: The Intergalactic Empire of Wakanda Part 4	Black Panther (vol. 7) #19–25	August 25, 2020	978-1302921101
Black Panther by Ta-Nehisi Coates: The Intergalactic Empire of Wakanda	Black Panther (vol. 7) #1–25	February 4, 2025	978-1302961763
Oversized hardcover
Black Panther Vol. 3: The Intergalactic Empire of Wakanda Part One	Black Panther (vol. 7) #1–12	August 11, 2020	978-1302925314
Black Panther Vol. 4: The Intergalactic Empire of Wakanda Part Two	Black Panther (vol. 7) #13–25	April 12, 2022	978-1302925420
Miscellaneous
King in Black: Avengers	King in Black: Black Panther #1 and King in Black: Captain America #1, King in Black: Ghost Rider #1, King in Black: Immortal Hulk #1, King in Black: Iron Man/Doom #1, King in Black: Wiccan and Hulkling #1	August 2021	978-1302930349
Black Panther and the Agents of Wakanda Vol. 1: Eye of the Storm	Black Panther and the Agents of Wakanda #1–5	March 2020	978-1302920081
Black Panther and the Agents of Wakanda Vol. 2	Black Panther and the Agents of Wakanda #6–10	August 2020	978-1302924478

== Volume 8 ==
Title	Material collected	Date published	ISBN
Paperback
Black Panther by John Ridley Vol. 1: The Long Shadow	Black Panther (vol. 8) #1–5	August 1, 2022	978-1846533525
Black Panther by John Ridley Vol. 2: Range Wars	Black Panther (vol. 8) #6–10	November 9, 2022	978-1302928834
Black Panther by John Ridley Vol. 3: All This and the World, Too	Black Panther (vol. 8) #11–15	June 13, 2023	978-1302947651
Miscellaneous
Black Panther Legends	Black Panther Legends #1–4, material from Shuri: A Black Panther Novel	October 4, 2022	978-1302931414
Wakanda	Wakanda #1–5	May 2, 2023	978-1302946951

== Volume 9 ==
Title	Material collected	Date published	ISBN
Paperback
Black Panther by Eve L. Ewing Vol. 1: Reign at Dusk	Black Panther (vol. 9) #1–5	January 2, 2024	978-1302948832
Black Panther by Eve L. Ewing Vol. 2: Reign at Dusk	Black Panther (vol. 9) #6–10	June 4, 2024	978-1302948849
