= From Prussia With Love (novel) =

From Prussia With Love is a novel by John de Chancie published by Prima Publishing, based on the Castle Falkenstein role-playing game.

== Plot summary ==
From Prussia With Love is a steampunk novel in which Castle Falkenstein is concerned about its safety as Prussia develops its own form of steam-powered intercontinental ballistic missiles.

== Reception ==
Gideon Kibblewhite reviewed From Prussia With Love for Arcane magazine, rating it a 5 out of 10 overall. Kibblewhite comments that "the book generally pokes fun at its characters, with the story taking the form of a general send-up of the action-adventure format – there's even a tip of the hat made to James Bond. Those looking for deeper, darker inspiration for Steampunk sessions should look elsewhere."

== Reviews ==
- Review by Don D'Ammassa (1996) in Science Fiction Chronicle, #190 October 1996
