= Brandon T. Snider =

American actor and writer

- Born: Cincinnati, Ohio, U.S.
- Occupation: Actor / writer
- Writing career
- Period: 1999–present
- Website: www.cootiekid.com

Brandon T. Snider (born February 28) is a New York City–based writer and actor who has written for and appeared on Comedy Central's Inside Amy Schumer. He's also been featured on Late Night with Conan O'Brien, Law & Order: Special Victims Unit and Chappelle's Show. Snider has written a number of books about comic book characters, pop culture icons and television shows. Noteworthy works include the award-winning Dark Knight Manual: Tools, Weapons, Vehicles and Documents from the Batcave and Marvel's Avengers: Infinity War: The Cosmic Quest Volumes 1 & 2. He is a member of both SAG-AFTRA and the Writers Guild of America East.

== Early life ==
Snider was born in Cincinnati, Ohio. He graduated with a Bachelor of Arts in theater from Coastal Carolina University.

== Acting ==
Brandon appeared in two sketches on NBC's Late Night with Conan O'Brien as well as an episode of Comedy Central's Chappelle's Show. He's also made numerous appearances on Comedy Central's Inside Amy Schumer. In Season 1, he played "The Producer" in the sketch "A Porn Star is Born" directed by Neal Brennan. In Season 2, he played "Trentman Schumer" in the sketch "Congresswoman Amy" directed by Ryan McFaul. In Season 3, he played "Glen" in the sketch "Dog Stripper" and "Fan #3" in the Season 4 sketch "Fame", also directed by McFaul. Additionally, Snider has been on Rachel Dratch's Late Night Snack, Law & Order: SVU, All My Children and Bull.

He's also appeared in commercials for Sprint, Spectrum, Liberty Mutual, Time Warner Cable, Heineken, DirecTV, AFLAC and New York Lottery among others. Additionally, Snider has been on Rachel Dratch's Late Night Snack, Bull, The Deuce and High Fidelity.

== Writing ==
Snider has authored over 75 books featuring fictional television and comic book characters from properties such as Star Trek, Cartoon Network and the Muppets. His hardcover DC Comics Ultimate Character Guide was released in 2011, and reached #4 on Bookscan's list of Best Selling Graphic Novels in May 2012 and his DC Super Heroes and Pets Papercraft with artist Art Baltazar was featured in 2016 gift guides from both Paste magazine and Comicosity. Snider has written two stories for the Regular Show comic book published by BOOM! Studios and based on the Cartoon Network program. He also wrote the Legion of Doom Stage Show in 2007 for the Six Flags amusement park. He currently writes the Peter Powers series for Little, Brown Books as well as the Mighty Marvel Chapter Books and Doodle Books for Disney Publishing.

In 2012, Snider wrote the best-selling Dark Knight Manual: Tools, Weapons, Vehicles and Documents from the Batcave, Published by Insight Editions, the book is a detailed and personal account of Bruce Wayne's evolution as Batman over the course of his career. The book features sketches, notes, and other top-secret case files in addition to about two dozen removable documents, including the design and capabilities of the Batsuit, blueprints revealing the inner workings of the Batcave, and the specifications for Batman's arsenal of weapons and gadgets. The Dark Knight Manual won the 2013 IPPY Award for Pop Culture/Leisure . It was also featured in Time magazine, Forbes, Wired, i09. While promoting the book, Snider appeared on the syndicated television show The List as well as local Cincinnati, Ohio FOX affiliate Channel 19. The Dark Knight Manual received positive reviews from Superhero Hype, Stuff We Like, Gotham News and Forever Geek.

In New York City, Snider studied improvisation with Second City and performed sketch comedy as part of the group Rash Behaviour in addition to writing humor for the news site, Huffington Post. As an ensemble member of the NY-based theatre company The Collective NY, he met and worked with comedian Amy Schumer. In 2013, Schumer hired Snider to write for the first season of her Comedy Central show, Inside Amy Schumer, which earned high ratings in 2013 and went on to win a Peabody Award in 2014. Snider's short play, A Weekend Conference, debuted as part of The Collective's Fourth Annual C:10 Play Festival in September 2016. The dark comedy follows three men on their way to a gay reparative therapy weekend. The piece was directed by Richard Masur (Transparent, The Good Wife) and starred Snider, Mike Houston (Orange is the New Black, Sneaky Pete) and Gabe Fazio (Place Beyond the Pines, Homeland). The short play is currently being developed into a full-length play entitled The Retreat.

In 2017, Snider and Kevin Kane returned to their college alma mater, Coastal Carolina University, to perform a series of short plays with their fellow Collective NY ensemble members as part of a professional exchange where they directed students, conducted a panel about not-for-profit theatre and led a writing workshop. Snider was the focus of a 2017 Publishers Weekly article on notable writers of licensed children's publishing.

Following the Pulse Nightclub shooting in 2016, Snider wrote an editorial piece entitled "Bigotry is not a difference of opinion" for the Cincinnati Enquirer.

Snider wrote Marvel's Avengers: Infinity War: The Cosmic Quest Volumes 1 & 2, companion novels featuring original tales from the Marvel Cinematic Universe that tie into the events depicted in the popular mega-franchise film. Volume One: Beginning, a prequel, found The Collector and his brother, Grandmaster, teaming up to search for an Infinity Stone. Volume Two: Aftermath featured Dr. Erik Selvig, Darcy Lewis and young science-minded kid named Felix Desta as they searched for answers regarding the event that wiped out half of all life in the universe. The book was notable for introducing a group of diverse characters called the Science Avengers, among them Anjelica Tan, the non-binary Anoki and Bisi Banyaga, the Reverse Engineer. The story also featured the return of Jane Foster, Thor's former love interest, prior to her inheriting the mantle of Thor in Love and Thunder. In addition to appearing on the This Week in Marvel podcast, Snider joined Marvel's Agent M, Ryan Penagos, to unveil an Avengers: Infinity War-themed library in South LA at the Newton Community Center as part of a partnership with the Little Free Library.

In 2019, Snider appeared on Andy Mangels' Out in Comics Panel at San Diego Comic-Con alongside Alitha E. Martinez, Chad Michaels, Lilah Sturges, Justin Hall, Che Grayson, Chuck Rozanski, and Vincent J. Roth.

After writing the Audible Original Beezer in 2020, Snider was tapped to pen Rube Goldberg and his Amazing Machines, a middle grade novel series for Abrams/Amulet, featuring the adventures of young Rube Goldberg as he navigates middle school. The summary for Book #1, arriving in November 2021, states "On the first day of middle school, Principal Kim announces that the school is going to throw a Contraption Convention—the perfect opportunity for young inventor Rube Goldberg to show off his inventions and get out of his summer-long funk! But after a fight with his friends Pearl and Boob about where his priorities really lie, Rube's Con Con entry gets off to a rocky start—and then strange incidents begin to throw the town into disarray. Boob is convinced it's a ghost causing all of this chaos. Between Con Con, the ghostly mystery, and a new rival, Rube has his work cut out for him. But with the help of his friends, he might just get things back on track, get on top of his burgeoning anxieties, and come up with something brilliant before it's time to face the judging table."

In 2022, Snider was honored by Mariemont High School as a Distinguished Alumni.

== Bibliography ==
- The Batman: Cry of the Penguin (2005)
- Smallville Magazine #17 "Toy Part 1" (2006)
- Superman Returns: Last Son of Krypton (2006)
- Superman Returns: Deluxe Sound Storybook (2006)
- Lucky's Pirate Adventure (2006)
- Smallville Magazine #18 "Toy Part 2" (2007)
- Smallville Magazine #21 "Voltage" (2007)
- Spider-Man 3: Deluxe Sound Storybook (2007)
- The Superman Guide to Life: Living the Super-Hero Lifestyle (2007)
- Prehistoric Park: Creatures & Beasts (2007)
- Smallville Magazine #24 "Quest" (2008)
- Green Lantern Book & Ring Kit (2011)
- DC Comics Ultimate Character Guide (2011)
- Frogs Are Funny!: The Most Sensational, Inspirational, Celebrational, Muppetational Muppets Joke Book EVER! (2011)
- The Dark Knight Rises: Secret Files Scrapbook (2012)
- The Dark Knight Manual: Tools, Weapons, Vehicles and Documents from the Batcave (2012)
- My Little Pony: The Elements of Harmony: Friendship is Magic: The Official Guidebook Hardcover (2013)
- Annoying Orange: How to Be Annoying: A Joke Book (2013)
- Regular Show #3 "Hot Tub" (2013)
- Regular Show #5 "Freegans" (2013)
- Vampire Academy: Official Movie Companion (2013)
- Plants vs Zombies: Brain Food (2013)
- Fantastic 4: Deluxe Sound Storybook (2014)
- Regular Show: Scribble & Sketch (2014)
- Adventure Time: BMO's Character File (2014)
- Transformers: Kre-O Character Encyclopedia with Special Figure (2014)
- Regular Show Game Night: Quips' Book of Questions, Quizzes & Games (2014)
- Mordecai and the Rigbys: The Experience (2014)
- Annoying Orange: Halloweenie (2014)
- Tenkai Knights Go (2014)
- It's Tenkai Time (2014)
- Tenkai Knights: The Power of Four (2014)
- Tenkai Knights: Tenkai Energy: Secrets of Quarton (2014)
- The Amazing World of Gumball: Be the Brush Doodle Book (2014)
- Regular Show Volume #1 (2014)
- Regular Show Volume #2 (2014)
- Skylanders A-Z Boxed Set (2014)
- Lego Learning: Sharks (2014)
- What Would Uncle Grandpa Do? (2015)
- Good Morning, UG-RV! An Unfoldable Journey Through the World of Uncle Grandpa (2015)
- Slice of Life with Pizza Steve (2015)
- Who in the Land of Ooo Are You? An Adventure Time Quiz Book (2015)
- Skylanders: The Complete Collection (2015)
- Minions: Build Your Own Minions Punch-Out Activity Book (2015)
- Minions: Snow Day (2015)
- Skylanders SuperChargers Portal Master Handbook (2016)
- Game Over! Mad Libs (2016)
- Star Trek: What Would Captain Kirk Do? (2016)
- LOL: A Keepsake Journal of Hilarious Q&As (2016)
- My Little Pony: Wonderbolts Academy Handbook (2016)
- Adventure Time: Hero Time with Finn and Jake: The Ultimate Guide to Becoming a Genuine Legend (2016)
- Teen Titans GO!: Jump City Jive! Character Guidebook (2016)
- DC Super Heroes and Pets Papercraft (2016)
- Peter Powers & His Not So Super Powers (2016)
- Doctor Strange: Mystery of the Dark Magic (2016)
- Write It Out: Hundreds of Writing Prompts to Inspire Creative Thinking (2016)
- Draw It Out: Hundreds of Drawing Prompts to Inspire Creative Expression (2016)
- The Collective: 10 Play Anthology: Volume 4: (2016)
- Peter Powers & the Rowdy Robot Raiders (2016)
- This or That #1 (2017)
- This or That #2 (2017)
- Transformers Rescue Bots: Meet Quickshadow (2017)
- Peter Powers & the Icky Insect Invasion (2017)
- Spider-Man Mad Libs (2017)
- Star Trek: What Would Captain Picard Do? (2016)
- Guardians of the Galaxy: Gamora's Galactic Showdown (2017)
- Guardians of the Galaxy Doodle Book (2017)
- Spider-Man Doodle Book (2017)
- Spider-Man Presents the Marvel Joke Book (2017)
- Powerpuff Girls: Donny the Unicorn Handbook (2017)
- My Little Pony: The Elements of Harmony 2 (2017)
- Transformers Rescue Bots: Ghost in the Machine (2017)
- Peter Powers & the League of Lying Lizards (2017)
- Justice League: Starro and the Cyberspore (2017)
- Justice League: Amazo and the Planetary Reboot (2017)
- Adventure Time: Finn & Jake's Travelogue (2017)
- Marvelous Adventures: 3 Mighty Marvel Chapter Books in 1! (2017)
- Peter Powers & the Sinister Snowman Showdown (2017)
- Hanazuki: Book of Treasures (2017)
- Peter Powers & the Swashbuckling Sky Pirates (2016)
- Black Panther: Battle for Wakanda (2018)
- The Far-from-Complete Compendium of Magiswords (2018)
- The Sword That Wasn't There: A Choose-Your-Magisword Adventure! (2018)
- Peter Powers & his Super-Powered Pals (2018)
- Star Wars Droids Mad Libs (2018)
- Wonder Woman Mad Libs (2018)
- Justice League: Gorilla Grodd and the Primate Protocol (2018)
- Justice League: Bizarro and the Doppelgängers of Doom (2018)
- The Collective: 10 Play Anthology: Volume 5 (2018)
- Avengers Doodle Book (2018)
- Marvel's Avengers: Infinity War: The Cosmic Quest Volume 1: Beginning (2018)
- Teen Titans Go!: The World-Famous Guidebook (2018)
- Grow Up, Ant-Man! (2018)
- Peter Powers & his Fantastic Family (2018)
- Wonder Woman: Amazing Amazon: Cheetah Unleashed (2018)
- Wonder Woman: Amazing Amazon: Circe's Dark Reign (2018)
- Marvel's Avengers: Infinity War: The Cosmic Quest Volume 2: Aftermath (2018)
- Rick & Morty Mad Libs Joke Book (2018)
- Bob's Burgers Mad Libs Joke Book (2019)
- The Amazing Adventures of Batman: Tricks and Treats! (2019)
- The Amazing Adventures of Batman: Rain of Fear! (2019)
- The Amazing Adventures of Batman: Bane Drain (2020)
- The Amazing Adventures of Batman: The Terrible Twos (2020)
- Beezer (2020)
- Marvel Storybook Collection (2020)
- Beezer and the Creeping Red (2021)
- Pride Parade Mad Libs (2021)
- Rube Goldberg and his Amazing Machines (2021)
- What is the Story of Transformers? (2022)
- Rube Goldberg and his Amazing Machines: The New Switcheroo (2022)
- Batman Mad Libs (2022)
- Richard Simmons Mad Libs (2022)
- Lazarus Planet: Next Evolution #1 (2023)
- Rube Goldberg and his Amazing Machines: Engine of Change (2023)
