= Jesse Holland =

American journalist, author

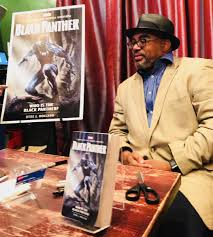
- Holland prepares to sign copies of Black Panther: Who Is The Black Panther? at Busboys and Poets in Washington, D.C.
- Born: Jesse James Holland Jr. June 28, 1971 (age 55); Memphis, Tennessee, U.S.
- Education: University of Mississippi
- Occupations: Broadcast journalist, author

Jesse James Holland Jr. (born June 28, 1971) is an American journalist, author, television personality and educator. He was one of the first African American journalists assigned to cover the Supreme Court full-time, and only the second African American editor of The Daily Mississippian, the college newspaper of the University of Mississippi. He was the former Visiting Distinguished Professor of Ethics in Journalism at the University of Arkansas, and now serves as a guest host on C-SPAN's Washington Journal.

== Biography ==
Jesse James Holland Jr. is a native of Memphis, TN and is one of four siblings. He grew up in the Orange Mound, Memphis neighborhood, which is the nation's first African-American neighborhood. His parents, Jesse James Holland and Yvonne Boga Holland, were both public school teachers in Memphis, Tennessee and Mount Pleasant, Mississippi, respectively, as well as owners and operators of a family farm in Marshall and Benton counties in Mississippi.

Holland attended the University of Mississippi, where he graduated with a bachelor's degree in Liberal Arts with emphasis in journalism and English in May 1994. He earned his Master of Fine Arts degree in creative nonfiction at Goucher College in Towson, Maryland in 2012. While an undergraduate, he worked as a reporter for The Oxford Eagle and as a reporter, editor and finally editor-in-chief of The Daily Mississippian, the college newspaper at the University of Mississippi. He was only the second black editor of the college's newspaper, for which he also co-wrote a comic strip called Hippie and The Black Guy.

Holland was a longtime Associated Press reporter, having joined the AP as an intern in 1994 in the Columbia, South Carolina bureau after stints as an intern at the Meredith Corporation, the Birmingham Post-Herald and The New York Times. He quickly became a legal reporter for the AP, covering the high-profile Susan Smith trial in Union, South Carolina for the news cooperative, earning him the Associated Press Managing Editors John L. Dougherty Excellence Award. He later became the statehouse reporter, covering the South Carolina government including Governors Carroll Campbell, David Beasley and Jim Hodges.

He transferred to the Albany, New York bureau in 1999, where he covered education, state government, Governor George Pataki and Hillary Clinton's first U.S. Senate run.

He worked as a Race & Ethnicity reporter for the Associated Press in Washington, D.C., where he has been stationed since 2000. Holland is one of the few Washington, D.C. reporters who has been credentialed to cover all three major branches of government: he worked as a Congressional reporter in 2000 and 2001–05, a White House reporter from 2000 to 2001, and a Supreme Court reporter from 2009 to 2014. He also served as National Labor Writer for the Associated Press from 2007 to 2009.

Holland left the Associated Press in September 2019 to take a position as Distinguished Visiting Scholar in Residence at the John W. Kluge Center at the Library of Congress.

He was named as Visiting Distinguished Professor of Ethics in Journalism at the University of Arkansas in 2016. He now teaches creative nonfiction and multimedia narrative at Goucher College and has taught journalism ethics at Georgetown University's School of Continuing Studies and at New York University's Washington D.C. campus.

== Books ==
Holland left the AP in 2005 to write his first book, Black Men Built The Capitol: Discovering African American History In and Around Washington, D.C., which was published in 2007. His second book, The Invisibles: The Untold Story of African American Slaves in The White House, was published in 2017, and was awarded a silver medal in U.S. history from the Independent Publishers Association.

Holland is also the author of the 2016 young adult book Star Wars: The Force Awakens - Finn's Story, about Finn, character played by John Boyega in the Star Wars movies, and the 2017 novel, Black Panther: Who Is The Black Panther?, the first novel featuring Marvel Comics' first black superhero, the Black Panther. The novel is an adaptation of Reginald Hudlin and John Romita Jr.'s "Who Is The Black Panther?" arc in the Black Panther comic book, and was nominated for an NAACP Image Award in 2019 for Outstanding Literary Work - Fiction. In February 2021, Titan Books will publish the anthology Black Panther: Tales of Wakanda edited by Holland; the book contains 18 stories written by various authors.

== Honors and awards ==
- 1996: Associated Press Managing Editor Association John L. Dougherty Excellence Award
- 1997: Presstime Magazine's Top 20 Under 40
- 2016: University of Arkansas Visiting Distinguished Professor of Ethics in Journalism
- 2016: Smithsonian.com Top History Books – The Invisibles: The Untold Story of African American Slavery Inside the White House
- 2017: Independent Publisher Book Award Silver Medal for U.S. History – The Invisibles: The Untold Story of African American Slavery Inside the White House
- 2019: NAACP Image Award for Outstanding Literary Work – Fiction – Black Panther: Who Is The Black Panther?
