= John DeChancie =

American novelist (born 1946)

John DeChancie (born August 3, 1946) is an American author. A Pittsburgh native, he is most famous for his comic fantasy Castle series, and his science fiction Skyway series. He is currently engaged in writing screenplays, teleplays, and prose fiction.

== The Castle Perilous Series ==
The Castle Perilous series revolves around Castle Perilous (the name is drawn from the Siege Perilous of Arthurian fable), whose lord is Incarnadine, a sorcerer. 144,000 doors (or "aspects") of the Castle each lead to another parallel universe. Some of these dimensions are magical, while others have little or no magic; one of the latter is Earth. Those who find themselves at the Castle often stay to become residents, and (to their surprise) develop a magical power of their own. This gift is apparently random, and can range from a minor telekinesis limited to lifting pencils to super-enhanced senses to teleportation to full conjuration of matter. The main character, a philosophy major from Earth named Gene Ferraro, gains the power of superb swordplay. His best friends include Snowclaw, a giant humanoid covered in white fur, who originally comes from a polar-like clime, and Linda Barclay, a woman from Earth who becomes a powerful sorceress.

== The Skyway Series ==
The Skyway series differs from the Castle series significantly; where the Castle series is humorous fantasy, the Skyway series is action-adventure science fiction. The Skyway series traces the adventures of Jake McGraw, who drives a futuristic cargo truck on the Skyway. The Skyway itself is a mysterious road, built by an unknown race of aliens, which runs across various planets from one portal to another. Driving through a portal (a "tollbooth") instantaneously transports you onto a different planet, many light years away. Humans found the Skyway on Pluto and began expanding along it, encountering various alien races along the way. However no one has a map, or knows where the Skyway begins or ends, and because each portal is one-way, only explored sections with a known return path (discovered by trial and error) are considered safe to travel.

At the beginning of the first book Jake finds himself in trouble because a number of parties, both human and alien, are convinced that he has found a map. Some are willing to kill to get it. Jake knows that he does not have a map, but no one believes him. At this point Jake is accompanied only by his father, Sam, who is actually dead but has been "converted" into an artificial intelligence unit that is built into the truck. The truck itself is a large tractor trailer unit, powered by nuclear fusion and capable of operating in a vacuum. The truck's cab can hold 8 or more people and has built-in bunks for sleeping. At the beginning of the first book Jake stops to pick up a hitchhiker (the beautiful and mysterious Darla), which is the beginning of a trend: over the course of the trilogy more and more people are riding with Jake while more and more people are also pursuing him. By the end of the trilogy Jake and his companions have reached the end of the Skyway, met with the beings that created it, and returned months earlier than when they left, bringing the trilogy to a conclusion.

== Bibliography ==
The Skyway series includes:

- Starrigger (1983)
- Red Limit Freeway (1984)
- Paradox Alley (1987)

The Castle series includes:

- Castle Perilous (1988)
- Castle For Rent (1989)
- Castle Kidnapped (1989)
- Castle War! (1990)
- Castle Murders (1991)
- Castle Dreams (1992)
- Castle Spellbound (1992)
- Bride of the Castle (1994)
- The Pirates of Perilous (2015)

The Dr. Dimension (co-written with David Bischoff) series includes:

- Dr. Dimension (1993)
- Masters of Spacetime (1994)

The Castle Falkenstein series includes:

- From Prussia with Love (1995)
- Masterminds of Falkenstein (1996)

Other books by DeChancie:

- The Crooked House (1987) w/Thomas F. Monteleone
- The Kruton Interface (1993)
- Innerverse (1996)
- Living with Aliens (1995)
- MagicNet (1993)
