= Black Panther: Who is the Black Panther? =

2017 novel by Jesse Holland

- Author: Jesse Holland
- Language: English
- Genre: Science fiction; action-adventure; fantasy
- Published: 2017
- Publisher: Marvel Entertainment
- Pages: 263
- ISBN: 978-1302902674

Black Panther: Who is the Black Panther? is a 2017 novel written by Jesse Holland. Set in the Marvel Cinematic Universe (MCU), it serves as an origin story for Chadwick Boseman's T'Challa, introduced in the previous year's Captain America: Civil War, ahead of him receiving his own film the next year, with the plot of the novel adapted from the comic book storyline of the same name by Reginald Hudlin and John Romita Jr. that ran from 2005 until 2010.

== Plot ==
The novel tells the legacy and origin of the Marvel Cinematic Universe character Black Panther, also known as T'Challa. He is the king and protector of the African nation known as Wakanda.

== Background ==
The novel was written by Jesse Holland, who was approached by Marvel Comics to write a companion novel to the 2018 Black Panther film. Holland agreed to write the novel because he had been a fan of the comic series since childhood. Holland later edited the short story collection Black Panther: Tales of Wakanda.

== Reception ==
The book received positive reviews. A review from NBC News praised the novel as "richly layered" and a "in-depth page turner". Stuart Conover of Sciencefiction.com praised the novel as a "faithful adaptation of the Black Panther's origin story."
