= Nick Fury (Marvel Cinematic Universe) =

Character in the Marvel Cinematic Universe

- Marvel Cinematic Universe character
- Samuel L. Jackson as Nick Fury as he appeared during the filming of The Avengers (2012).
- First appearance: Iron Man (2008)
- Based on: Nick Fury by; Stan Lee; Jack Kirby; Ultimate Nick Fury by; Brian Michael Bendis; Mike Allred
- Adapted by: Mark Fergus Hawk Ostby; Art Marcum Matt Holloway
- Portrayed by: Samuel L. Jackson

In-universe information
- Full name: Nicholas Joseph Fury
- Gender: Male
- Titles: Director; Colonel (U.S. Army)
- Occupation: Director of S.A.B.E.R.; Founder of the Avengers; Director of S.H.I.E.L.D.; Agent of S.H.I.E.L.D.; CIA agent; Soldier
- Affiliation: S.A.B.E.R.; Nick Fury's Crew; Skrulls; Avengers Initiative; Project Pegasus; S.H.I.E.L.D.; Central Intelligence Agency; United States Army
- Spouse: Varra / Priscilla Davis
- Nationality: American

Nicholas Joseph Fury is a fictional character portrayed by Samuel L. Jackson in the Marvel Cinematic Universe (MCU) media franchise, based on the Marvel Comics character of the same name. Fury is depicted as the Director of S.H.I.E.L.D., and enacts the Avengers Initiative after encountering Captain Marvel/Carol Danvers and the Skrulls, while also learning of extraterrestrial threats such as the Kree.

Fury assists his assembled team as they battle a range of threats, including Loki, the Winter Soldier, and Ultron. He later assists Captain America in taking down S.H.I.E.L.D., after it is found to be compromised by the terrorist organisation Hydra. He fakes his death and hands over directorship to a resurrected Agent Phil Coulson. After falling victim to the Blip and being restored to life, Fury dedicates his time to developing the aerospace defense space station, S.A.B.E.R. He is later called back to Earth to stop an invasion of rogue Skrulls, before returning to S.A.B.E.R. Fury and S.A.B.E.R. then investigate an outer space anomaly with S.A.B.E.R. agent Monica Rambeau, Danvers, and the young vigilante Kamala Khan, and they work together to defeat the Kree Supremor Dar-Benn.

Prior to the formation of the MCU, Marvel Comics incorporated Jackson's likeness into the reimagined design of the character for The Ultimates (2002). As of 2025, Jackson has gone on to portray Fury in twelve MCU films, beginning with an appearance in the post-credits scene of Iron Man (2008). He also appeared in two episodes of the television series Agents of S.H.I.E.L.D. (2013–2014) and starred as the protagonist of the Disney+ miniseries Secret Invasion (2023). Alternate versions of the character appear in the Disney+ animated series What If...? (2021–2024), with Jackson reprising the role. Jackson has received critical and fan acclaim for his role. He will once again reprise the role in Avengers: Secret Wars (2027).

== Concept, creation, and characterization ==
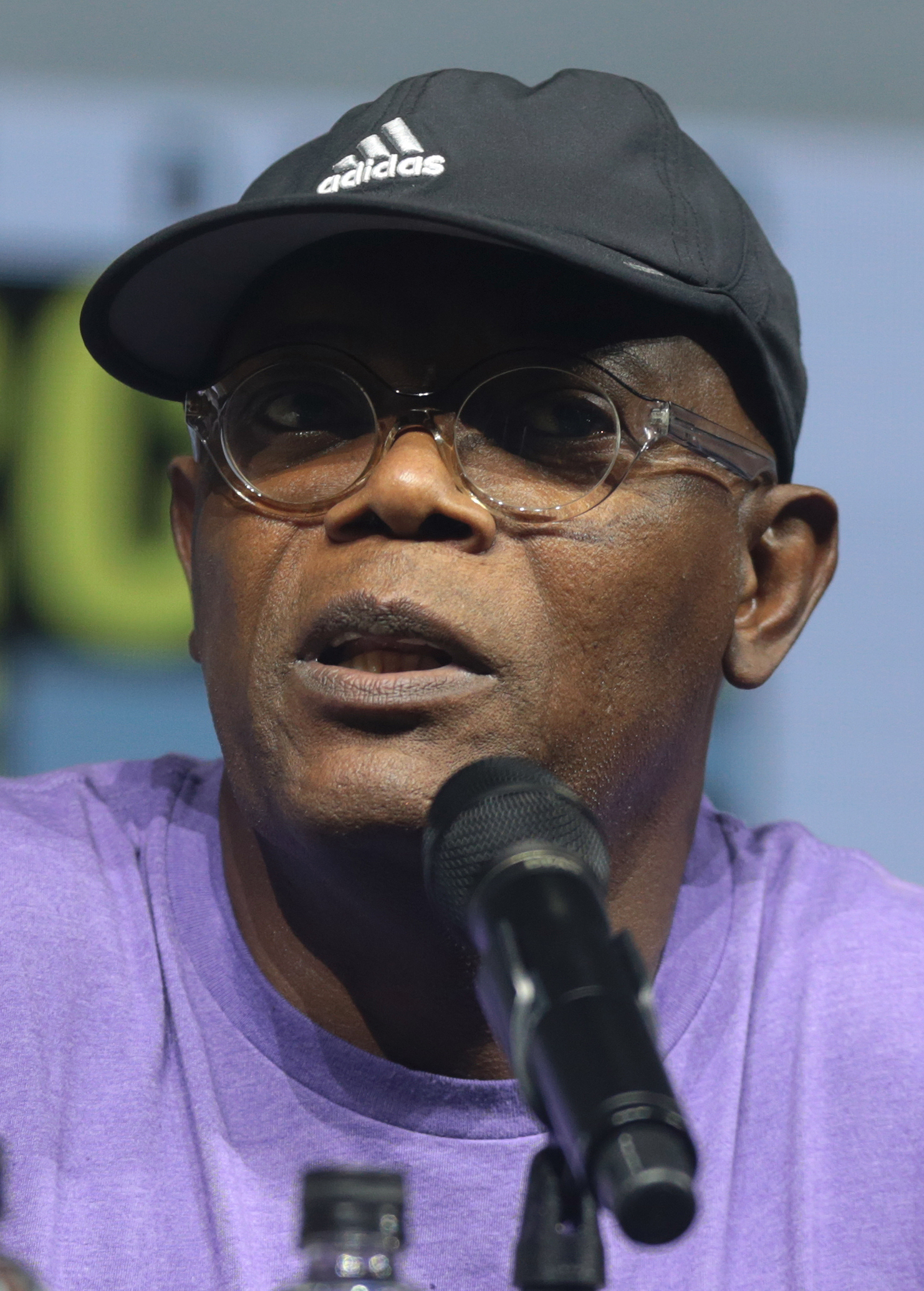
Jackson at the 2018 San Diego Comic-Con

Fury originally appeared in American comic books published by Marvel Comics. Created by writer/artist Jack Kirby and writer Stan Lee, Fury first appeared in Sgt. Fury and his Howling Commandos No. 1 (May 1963), a World War II combat series that portrayed the cigar-chomping Fury as leader of an elite U.S. Army unit. In 1998, David Hasselhoff portrayed Fury in the Fox television movie Nick Fury: Agent of S.H.I.E.L.D., which was intended to be a backdoor pilot for a possible new TV series, which did not materialize. In 2002, Marvel Comics designed their "Ultimate" version of the character Nick Fury after the likeness of Samuel L. Jackson. However, Marvel Studios initially discussed a potential film role with George Clooney, who turned it down after reviewing some of the comic book source material and finding Fury to be too violent of a character. According to the audio commentary of the 2007 film Fantastic Four: Rise of the Silver Surfer, director Tim Story said the script originally contained Nick Fury, but the role eventually became that of General Hager (played by Andre Braugher), as having Fury would have forced 20th Century Fox to purchase the rights to that character.

In the mid-2000s, Kevin Feige realized that Marvel still owned the rights to the core characters, which included Fury. Feige, a self-professed "fanboy", envisioned creating a shared universe just as creators Stan Lee and Jack Kirby had done with their comic books in the early 1960s. In 2004, David Maisel was hired as chief operating officer of Marvel Studios as he had a plan for the studio to self-finance movies. Marvel entered into a non-recourse debt structure with Merrill Lynch, under which Marvel got $525 million to make a maximum of 10 movies based on the company's properties over eight years, collateralized by certain movie rights to a total of 10 characters, including Nick Fury.

Jackson was then offered the role, initially signing a nine-film contract with Marvel to portray Nick Fury in the Marvel Cinematic Universe. In 2019, Jackson confirmed that, while that year's Captain Marvel marked the end of his nine-film contract with Marvel, he would continue to portray Fury in future films. Jackson thereafter appeared in a cameo in Avengers: Endgame, and in a substantial role in Spider-Man: Far From Home.

The MCU version of Nick Fury jettisoned a number of details from the original comic book version. Aside from the original Nick Fury character being white in the primary Marvel Comics multiverse Earth-616 (the multiverse in which he would have a mixed race son named Nick Fury Jr instead), the original comic book Nick Fury was a World War II veteran who knew Captain America and led the Howling Commandos; losing sight in his left eye during a grenade attack in that war. In both the original comic book and the Ultimate Marvel versions, Fury was able to remain active many decades after the war because he aged unnaturally slowly due to regular doses of an Infinity Formula. A popular character over a number of decades, in 2011, Fury was ranked 33rd in IGN's "Top 100 Comic Book Heroes", and 32nd in their list of "The Top 50 Avengers". He has sometimes been considered an antihero.

== Fictional character biography ==
=== Early life at S.H.I.E.L.D. ===
Nicholas Joseph Fury was born in Huntsville, Alabama on July 4, 1950. He joined the United States Army after graduating from high school, eventually becoming a Colonel. He later left the army to join the Central Intelligence Agency, where he served as a spy during the Cold War. He was eventually recruited to the covert espionage agency S.H.I.E.L.D.

In 1995, Kree Empire Starforce member Vers crash-lands in Los Angeles, drawing S.H.I.E.L.D. agents Fury and Phil Coulson to investigate. In an ensuing Skrull attack, Fury kills a Skrull impersonating Coulson. Skrull commander Talos, disguised as Fury's boss Keller, orders Fury to work with Vers and keep tabs on her. Vers, escaping capture by the Skrull, uses memories they have extracted to bring Fury to the Project Pegasus installation at a U.S. Air Force base. They discover Vers was Carol Danvers, a pilot presumed to have died in 1989 while testing an experimental jet engine designed by Dr. Wendy Lawson, whom Vers recognizes as a woman from her nightmares. They then encounter Lawson's cat, Goose. Fury then informs S.H.I.E.L.D. of their location and a team led by Talos disguised as Keller arrives. Fury discovers Talos's ruse and helps Danvers escape in a Quadjet with Goose. They fly to Louisiana to meet former pilot Maria Rambeau, the last person to see Danvers and Lawson alive. They also meet her daughter, Monica. Later, Danvers, Talos, Fury, Goose, and Rambeau locate Lawson's cloaked laboratory orbiting Earth, where Lawson hid several Skrulls, including Talos's family, Soren and G'iah, and the Tesseract, the power source of Lawson's engine. Danvers is captured by Starforce, and in the subsequent fight, Fury retrieves Goose, who is revealed to be an alien Flerken. Goose swallows the Tesseract and while on a spaceship over the Mojave Desert, scratches Fury's face, blinding his left eye. Danvers departs to help the Skrulls find a new homeworld, leaving Fury a modified pager to contact her in an emergency. Meanwhile, Fury adopts Goose and drafts an initiative to locate heroes like Danvers, naming it after her Air Force call sign, "Avenger".

In 1997, Fury meets with the Skrulls again on Earth after he and Danvers are unable to find a home for them. He and Talos hold a meeting with Soren, G'iah, and other Skrull refugees including Varra, who introduces him to Gravik. He tells them he and Danvers will keep their promise in finding them a home if they help to protect Earth in the meantime.

In 1998, Fury goes to New York City and meets in a restaurant with Varra, who has assumed the appearance of a human named Priscilla, where she discloses top secret information about the Red Room. At some point thereafter, Fury marries Priscilla.

Later, Fury became the Deputy Chief of S.H.I.E.L.D.'s Bogotá station, where he "proved his leadership mettle" by engineering the rescue of hostages captured by Colombian rebels at the country's embassy, including the daughter of then-S.H.I.E.L.D. Director Alexander Pierce, prompting Pierce to make him director of S.H.I.E.L.D., while Pierce joined the World Security Council.

=== Assembling the Avengers ===
In 2010, Fury visits Tony Stark in his Malibu home and recruits him into the "Avengers Initiative".

Six months later in 2011, Fury approaches Stark at Randy's Donuts, revealing that Stark's recently acquired new assistant "Natalie Rushman" is S.H.I.E.L.D. Agent Natasha Romanoff and that his father Howard was a S.H.I.E.L.D. founder whom Fury knew personally. Fury explains that Vanko's father Anton and Howard invented the arc reactor together, but when Anton tried to sell it, Howard had him deported. Fury gives Stark some of his father's old material, enabling Stark to synthesize a new element for his arc reactor that ends his palladium dependency. Later, Fury informs Stark that because of his difficult personality, S.H.I.E.L.D. intends to use him only as a consultant.

In 2012, Fury enlists Dr. Erik Selvig to study the Tesseract.

In New York City, he oversees the reintroduction of Steve Rogers into modern society.

Fury is present with his colleague and friend, Maria Hill, at the S.H.I.E.L.D. facility when Loki arrives to steal the Tesseract and take control of Agent Clint Barton and Selvig. Fury recruits Rogers, and sends Romanoff to recruit Bruce Banner, while Coulson recruits Stark, to help Barton and fight Loki. Later, Fury uses Coulson's death to motivate the Avengers, now including Thor, to work as a team, leading to their stand against Loki and the invading Chitauri army in New York City. When the World Security Council authorizes the nuclear bombing of the city to defeat the invasion, Fury uses a rocket launcher to take out one of the two jets launching for that mission, but is too late to stop the second, which fires a missile that is intercepted by Stark.

After Loki's defeat, Fury authorizes the use of alien technology to resurrect Coulson from death and, in response to the invasion, convinces the Council that the world needs "a quantum surge in threat analysis".

=== Fighting Hydra and Ultron ===
In 2014, Fury trains Rogers to be a S.H.I.E.L.D. agent and proposes Project Insight: three S.H.I.E.L.D. Helicarriers armed with spy satellite guided guns, designed to preemptively eliminate threats. The Helicarriers are capable of continuous suborbital flight, due to new Repulsor engines proposed by Stark, their guns can kill 1,000 targets per minute, and the satellites, launched from the Lemurian Star, a S.H.I.E.L.D. vessel, can read a target's DNA anywhere in the world. However, when the project is a few weeks away from completion, Fury grows suspicious about Insight. He hires an Algerian mercenary, Georges Batroc, to hijack the Star as cover to allow Romanoff onto the ship with Rogers to retrieve data regarding Insight. Though Romanoff is successful, Fury is unable to decrypt the data, increasing his suspicions and forcing him to convince Pierce to delay the project. Shortly afterwards, an attempt is made on Fury's life by Hydra, which is revealed to have taken over S.H.I.E.L.D. Fury is apparently killed by their most dangerous assassin, the Winter Soldier, but he is revealed to have faked his death using Tetrodotoxin B, a drug designed by Banner that was capable of slowing down the heart to 1 beat per minute. Rogers, Sam Wilson, and Romanoff are taken by Hill to see him alive and in a hidden bunker. After it is revealed that Pierce is working for Hydra, Fury reappears to override Hydra's control of S.H.I.E.L.D.'s computer systems, forcing Pierce to unlock S.H.I.E.L.D's database so Romanoff can leak classified information, exposing Hydra to the public. Fury reveals that although Pierce had deleted Fury's retinal scan from the system, Fury had a backup scan of his destroyed other eye. He then tells Rogers, Wilson, and Romanoff that he is to go into hiding in Europe to hunt down more Hydra cells.

Once Hydra's plan to control the world is foiled, Fury appears to assist S.H.I.E.L.D. agents in the aftermath of those events, rescuing agents Leo Fitz and Jemma Simmons from drowning in the ocean and providing Agent Coulson with the Destroyer gun to take out enemy soldiers, before they confront John Garrett and Deathlok. In the aftermath, Coulson vaporizes Garrett and criticizes Fury for using GH325 to revive him. Fury responds that he values Coulson as much as any Avenger, because he represents the heart and moral center of S.H.I.E.L.D., and declares Coulson the new director of S.H.I.E.L.D., tasking him with rebuilding the organization from scratch, and equips him with a 'toolbox' containing useful data.

In 2015, Fury arrives at Barton's home in Iowa to help and motivate Stark, Rogers, Romanoff, Banner, and Barton to formulate a plan to stop Ultron. He, Hill, and other former agents of S.H.I.E.L.D., and James Rhodes use the original helicarrier to help the Avengers in Sokovia during the final battle against Ultron. Afterwards, he oversees the Avengers transition into the new Avengers Compound.

Coulson subsequently reveals to Gonzalez and his board that he and Fury had discovered that the original helicarrier survived HYDRA's attack and repaired it as a failsafe in case of an emergency.

=== Aftermath of the Infinity War ===
In 2018, Fury and Hill are travelling in Atlanta discussing the Avengers' whereabouts when Hill suddenly disintegrates due to the Blip, prompting Fury to use his pager to summon Danvers, before he too disintegrates.

In 2023, Fury is restored to life and attends Stark's funeral, reuniting with Danvers. Fury tasks a group of Skrulls to collect DNA samples from the Battle of Earth. He is then tasked by the United States government to lead S.A.B.E.R., an organization focused on protecting Earth from extraterrestrial threats, and run the space station. (Note: As revealed in Secret Invasion (2023)) He then appoints Talos and Soren to impersonate him and Hill.

In 2024, Fury is informed by Talos via phone call that Peter Parker received Tony Stark's glasses. Talos then asked Fury to come back to Earth, as people were beginning to ask what happened to the Avengers. On the space station, Fury disconnects the call.

=== Secret Invasion ===
In 2026, Fury, who is suffering from PTSD due to the Blip, is called by Hill to come back to Earth due to a Skrull invasion. He is picked up by Hill and taken to a safe house in Russia, where he reunites with Talos. He is updated on the threat that Gravik poses and leaves for a walk, and is captured by MI6 agents, and taken to Sonya Falsworth's residence. She informs him he is not up for the fight and that she will not partner with him. Fury places a bug in her office and returns to the safe house, where he, Hill, and Talos learn more information. They learn from G'iah (who has fallen in with Gravik's organization) of a planned attack on Unity Day in Moscow and infiltrate to stop the bombings, only to be tricked by Gravik, who taunts Fury and shapeshifts into him and shoots Hill.

Fury is taken away from the scene by Talos and they take a train to Warsaw, Poland. Fury learns that Talos summoned the million remaining Skrulls to Earth which frustrates him and he dismisses Talos. He goes to London and calls Rhodes, asking to meet with him. Unbeknownst to Fury, Rhodes has been abducted by Gravik and replaced by a Skrull agent named Raava. They meet in a tavern and Fury defends himself for being at the attack site and tells Raava of the Skrull invasion. In-character as "Rhodes", Raava refuses to believe him after Fury refuses to call the Avengers for help, and has him discharged. Fury leaves, finds his hidden vehicle, and reunites with Varra at her house.

Fury asks her if she has had any contact with Gravik, but she declines to answer. Instead she asks for apologies after having left her once he returned in the Blip. Fury leaves the house and seeks out Talos, asking him for his help again. They learn from G'iah that Gravik has had some of his men infiltrate a British Royal Navy submarine with the intention of firing a missile at a plane transporting a United Nations delegation. Obtaining the identity and location of the submarine's commander from Falsworth, Fury and Talos successfully infiltrate the commander's residence, kill the Skrull impersonating the commander, and are able to stop the missile attack with G'iah's help.

Through a bug planted in Varra's phone, Fury learns about "Rhodes" being a Skrull, and eavesdrops as Raava gives Varra orders to kill Fury or be killed herself. He sits down with Varra, acknowledges his mistake in neglecting his responsibilities as Varra's husband. After quoting Raymond Carver's "Late Fragment" to one another, they each shoot at the wall behind the other, before Fury leaves. Reconvening with Talos, Fury infiltrates Raava's hotel suite and tricks her into drinking a bottle of expensive bourbon containing a liquid tracker. This enables Fury and Talos to follow her, and stumble upon Gravik and his men carrying out an attack on President Ritson's motorcade. Fury and Talos stop the attack and successfully rescue Ritson, but Talos is shot in the shoulder by Pagon and subsequently stabbed to death by Gravik.

Fury gets Ritson to a hospital and confronts Raava, who reveals that she has leaked footage of Hill's death, placing Fury on a global watchlist. Fury later meets with G'iah, who reveals Gravik is looking for the "Harvest". Gravik calls Fury, offering to call off a planned airstrike on New Skrullos if he brings him the "Harvest" in person. In Finland, Fury leads Falsworth to a grave marked with his name which contains the "Harvest": a collection of DNA from the superheroes who fought during the Battle of Earth. Fury passes the Harvest off to G'iah, who assumes Fury's appearance to confront and kill Gravik to avenge her parents' deaths along with Maria Hill's. Meanwhile, Fury and Falsworth infiltrate Ritson's hospital and kill Raava in front of Ritson, encouraging him to call off the aistrike. In the fallout of the invasion, Ritson declares all extraterrestrial beings on Earth as "enemy combatants", encouraging a wave of vigilantism against people suspected of being Skrulls. After telling Ritson off, Fury asks Varra to come to S.A.B.E.R. with him to help negotiate a peace summit with the Kree. She agrees and they leave Earth together.

=== Meeting Kamala Khan ===
Sometime afterwards, Fury learns of a jump point anomaly near the space station and gets in contact with Danvers, while dispatching Monica Rambeau, who he had recruited following her involvement in the Westview Anomaly, to investigate it. However, Rambeau gets switched with Kamala Khan, who introduces herself to a confused Fury. Fury then receives data about Khan and meets with Rambeau after she is returned to the station. As they depart on a space elevator to Earth, Fury encounters Danvers who gets swapped with Rambeau, along with Khan and some Kree soldiers. Fury meets Rambeau again after she gets swapped back and they arrive at the Khan residence in Jersey City, New Jersey, where Fury is reunited with Goose. They speak with Khan, but when she tries demonstrating her powers, she is switched with Danvers. After Danvers flies away, Fury prompts Rambeau to save Khan from falling in the sky. Fury takes Goose, Khan's mother Muneeba, father Yusuf, and brother Aamir, to the space station. When the station gets destabilized due to the jump point anomalies created by Dar-Benn, Fury sees that Goose has given birth to Flerken kittens and uses them to safely evacuate the S.A.B.E.R. agents. He, Goose, and the Khans evacuate in an escape pod but are blasted by Dar-Benn's unstable jump point and crash land in New York City. They are shortly met by Khan in Danvers' ship, who informs them that Rambeau became trapped in another universe. Fury then returns to the space station with the agents in loss over Rambeau's disappearance.

== Alternate versions ==
Several alternate versions of Nick Fury appear in the animated series What If...?, with Jackson reprising his role.

=== Meeting Captain Carter ===
In an alternate 2012, Fury and Barton meet Captain Carter after she arrives through a portal opened by the Tesseract.

In 2014, Fury sent Carter and Romanoff on a mission to rescue the hijacked S.H.I.E.L.D. vessel Lemurian Star, where Carter later discovered Rogers preserved in the Hydra Stomper armor, but brainwashed by the agents of the Red Room.

=== Death of the Avengers ===
In an alternate 2010, Fury witnesses Stark, Barton, Thor, and Romanoff's deaths during his Avengers Initiative recruitment campaign. He eventually deduces that their murders were instigated by Hank Pym and temporarily allies with Loki to confront him in San Francisco. After Pym is defeated, Loki quickly subjugates the planet and becomes its ruler, prompting Fury to summon Danvers and awaken Rogers.

Sometime later, Fury leads a resistance movement against Loki and his army with a new Avengers team composed of Rogers and Danvers. As they fight on the Helicarrier, Fury watches as a Romanoff from another universe appears and subdues Loki with his Scepter. Despite acknowledging that she is not the Romanoff he knows, Fury praises her for sharing the same spirit and recruits her into the Avengers.

=== Stopping Thor's party and Chasing Darcy and Howard's Child ===
In an alternate 2011, Fury goes to Las Vegas to confront Thor regarding his out-of-control intergalactic party. He is accidentally knocked out by Korg during one of his cannonballs and falls into a coma causing Maria Hill to fill in until he regains consciousness.

Years later, Fury is contacted by Darcy Lewis and Howard the Duck for assistance in retrieving their egg back. He tells them that because the child was born during the Cosmic Convergence, it is wanted by many. He tells Phil Coulson privately that they will go to Knowhere. He and Coulson arrive in Knowhere and interrupt Kaecilius's zealot plan, telling Lewis and Howard that their child needs to be under S.H.I.E.L.D.'s care. Fury, Coulson, and Skrull agents go to Jotunheim where Lewis and Howard had taken shelter with Loki. After the egg has hatched after its energies subdued Kaecilius' forces, Malekith's army, and Thanos and the Black Order while Zeus flees, Fury decides to abandon taking the child, and returns to Earth.

=== 1602 ===
In an alternate 1602, Fury and the Scarlet Witch meet Captain Peggy Carter after the Scarlet Witch transported her into their universe.

Weeks later, Fury is with Queen Hela and Prince Thor to hear Loki's performance, when a tear in the universe opens up due to the impending incursion. After Hela is swept away, he and Happy Hogan recognize Thor as the new King. Afterwards, Fury has a meeting with the Scarlet Witch, Thor, and Hogan about the incursion. Later, Fury is present in the courtroom when Carter, Steve Rogers, Bucky Barnes, and Scott Lang arrive to take Thor's Scepter. Once Tony Stark's device is ready and the Scarlet Witch gives the signal, Fury kicks away Thor and takes the Scepter, giving it to Stark who puts the Time Stone in the device. It reveals that Rogers is the time-displaced person setting off the incursion and once Carter sends him home, Fury and the others are sent back to their universes.

== Reception ==
=== Critical response ===
In a generally positive review of The Avengers, Associated Press reviewer Christy Lemire wrote that "[t]he no-nonsense Nick Fury (Samuel L. Jackson), the head of S.H.I.E.L.D.—which had been entrusted with the safety of [the Tesseract]—springs into action to reacquire it by assembling a dream team of superheroes and other sundry bad-asses with specialized skills." Reviewing The Winter Soldier, Todd McCarthy of The Hollywood Reporter said that "from a dramatic point of view, the greatest interest lies with Jackson and Redford, two great veterans whose presence lends weight to the fantastical proceedings and whose characters take some interesting twists and turns before it's all over." Chris E. Hayne of GameSpot ranked Fury 19th in their "38 Marvel Cinematic Universe Superheroes" list, writing, "There is no Avengers without Nick Fury. The former director of SHIELD started the Avenger initiative and at this point we know he's out there in space somewhere, just waiting for the change to wind up back on earth."

Fury was noted to have been "largely missing in Phase Three of the Marvel Cinematic Universe", with both Jackson and fans of the franchise being "bummed that Fury was left out of Civil War and Black Panther", though he later had a substantial role in Captain Marvel. Writing for Variety, Owen Gleiberman said of the latter film that the "digitally de-aged Samuel L. Jackson" in Captain Marvel was "done a surprising favor by the visual trickery. He seems different than usual—lighter and perkier."

Jackson himself is fond of playing the character. After receiving an honorary Oscar in 2021, he remarked in an interview with the Los Angeles Times that he prefers the role over ones in what he described as "statue chasing movies."

=== Accolades ===
Year	Award	Category	Work	Result
2008	IGN Awards	Best Cameo	Iron Man	Won
2011	IGN Awards	Favorite Cameo	Thor	Nominated
2014	Saturn Awards	Best Supporting Actor	Captain America: The Winter Soldier	Nominated
2019	Teen Choice Awards	Choice Action Movie Actor	Captain Marvel	Nominated
2019	People's Choice Awards	The Male Movie Star of 2019	Captain Marvel	Nominated
2024	People's Choice Awards	The Male TV Star of the Year	Secret Invasion	Nominated
2024	NAACP Image Awards	Outstanding Actor in a Television Movie, Mini-Series or Dramatic Special	Secret Invasion	Nominated

== See also ==
- Characters of the Marvel Cinematic Universe
- Nick Fury in other media
