= The Dresden Files (TV series) =

Canadian/American television series

- Genre: Dark fantasy; Occult detective; Urban fantasy
- Based on: The Dresden Files by Jim Butcher
- Developed by: Hans Beimler; Robert Hewitt Wolfe
- Starring: Paul Blackthorne; Valerie Cruz; Terrence Mann; Conrad Coates; Raoul Bhaneja
- Countries of origin: Canada; United States
- No. of seasons: 1
- No. of episodes: 12

Production
- Executive producers: Nicolas Cage; Norm Golightly; Robert Hewitt Wolfe; David Simkins
- Producers: Lawrence Walsh; Jack Bernstein; Barry Schkolnick; Curtis Kheel; Jonathan Hackett
- Running time: 45 minutes
- Production companies: Dresden Files Productions; BOC Inc.; Saturn Films; Lionsgate Television

Original release
- Network: Space, Sci Fi Channel
- Release: January 21 – April 15, 2007

The Dresden Files is a dark fantasy television series based on the fantasy book series of the same name by Jim Butcher. The series follows private investigator and wizard Harry Dresden as portrayed by Paul Blackthorne, and recounts investigations into supernatural disturbances in modern-day Chicago. It premiered on January 21, 2007, on Sci Fi Channel in the United States and on Space in Canada. It was picked up by Sky One in the UK and began airing on February 14 the same year.

The series ran for a single season of 12 episodes, and has since been released on DVD. After the show ended on April 15, Sci Fi Channel revealed on August 3 that The Dresden Files was canceled and the second season was not picked up.

== Cast and characters ==
Casting was confirmed in November 2005 by Robert Hewitt Wolfe:

=== Main cast ===
(From left to right) Paul Blackthorne, Valerie Cruz, Terrence Mann, Conrad Coates: the main cast of The Dresden Files

- Paul Blackthorne as Harry Dresden, a reluctant hero, a professional wizard who often helps the police with cases involving "unusual" circumstances and others who seek his help. Harry's mother Burdine Dresden, a powerful witch, died when he was young. He was raised by his father, a stage magician. When he was about 11, his powers began to emerge, and his uncle Justin Morningway wanted to take him and teach him about his abilities, so he murdered Harry's father with black magic when his father did not relinquish Harry to him. Bob makes reference to Harry "self-defensing" his uncle to death. Justin Morningway left a programmed Doppelgänger behind to resurrect him if he died. It is later revealed Harry inherited a large amount of money that he gave to charity and owns the Morningway estate, in which he refuses to live.
- Valerie Cruz as Lt. Connie Murphy, the Chicago police officer who often seeks out Harry's help with cases that are hard to solve and may be supernaturally related, although she refuses to outright believe in magic, because such things do not fit with her "rules". She is dedicated and takes her job seriously, even going as far as seeking out the only wizard in the phonebook to help with cases. Lt. Murphy is a tough, no-nonsense woman who is divorced and has a daughter (Anna) who she says spends a lot of time with her father because of the long hours she has to work. Connie apparently has some romantic feelings toward Harry. She pointed out at the end of season one that if he kissed her again, she would not slap him.
- Terrence Mann as Hrothbert "Bob" of Bainbridge, the old spirit owned by Dresden. He was once owned by Dresden's uncle, Justin Morningway, before Dresden "self-defensed" him to death. He advises Dresden on both personal and magical matters. Bob is an invaluable source of knowledge which Dresden taps to solve supernatural crimes. In the first episode, Bob is seen redesigning a "Doom Box", which he describes as "a supernatural jack-in-the-box" containing and amplifying magical energy. The original Doom Box formula was included in a grimoire Bob wrote while he was alive; the book had been in Justin's possession until Harry burned it. Bob's current state is a punishment; he was executed, his soul sealed into his own skull for all eternity, for using black magic to bring a sorceress he had loved (Winnifred) back from the dead several hundred years ago. Bob died from an axe blow to the back of the head in 900 AD.
- Conrad Coates as Warden Donald Morgan, a warden of the High Council, the governing body of the wizarding community, and is assigned to the Chicago area. He is a stickler for the rules, powerful, and often confronts Harry because of their differing ideals and personalities; nonetheless, he often works with Harry - albeit under the table - where innocents are involved.
- Raoul Bhaneja as Det. Sid Kirmani, an original character who appears to be an amalgamation of all the skeptical detectives who doubted Harry in the novels. A sarcastic cop who is deeply suspicious of Dresden, Kirmani often functions as Murphy's partner, or lead detective, and more than once has implicated Dresden to be guilty of the crimes he is investigating, more than once arresting the wizard simply because the crime is otherwise not apparently explainable.

=== Recurring cast ===
- Matt Gordon as M.E. Waldo Butters, a Chicago PD medical examiner who has assisted Lt. Murphy on several of her more bizarre cases.
- Daniel Kash as Justin Morningway, warden of the High Council and Dresden's uncle, believed to be dead.
- Joanne Kelly as Bianca, one of the most powerful vampires in Chicago, and a member of the Red Court.
- Jane McLean as Ancient Mai (portrayed by Elizabeth Thai in the pilot), the High Council's "top dog", who handles contact with other supernatural powers.
- Natalie Lisinska as Laura Ellis, a waitress in a local diner, Harry's love interest in two episodes.

=== Minor magical characters ===
- Dylan Everett as Scott Sharp—a 10-year-old adoptee with magical talent who was targeted by a skinwalker.
- Kathleen Munroe as Heather Bram—a recently converted lycanthrope who has left Chicago to face her new condition on her own.
- Kim Coates as Sirota—an earth-bound demon responsible for converting humans into hellspawn.
- Kerry LaiFatt as Sharon Mirell—a former Chicago PD coroner who practices the very dark art of reanimation.
- Nathan Stephenson as Dante Arrias—a magically talented college student who temporarily wielded the power to create doorways.
- Christine Horne as Amber—a warden of the High Council; she helped Morgan protect Ancient Mai from a Kirtonian Dracoform.
- Yannick Bisson as Sgt. Darren Munzer—a daring Chicago detective who cheated death by stealing other people's second chances.

== Episodes ==
No.	Title	Directed by	Written by	Original release date	Prod. code	US viewers (millions)
1	"Birds of a Feather"	Michael Robison	Peter Egan	January 21, 2007	103	1.732
Believing monsters are after him, a young boy searches out the help of the only wizard listed in the Chicago Yellow Pages – Harry Dresden.
2	"The Boone Identity"	James A. Contner	George Mastras	January 28, 2007	104	1.891
The ghost of a murdered girl can't rest until justice is brought to her killer, who is already dead.
3	"Hair of the Dog"	Michael Nankin	Laurence Walsh	February 11, 2007	105	1.17
Lt. Murphy requests Dresden's help in solving a series of bizarre murder cases. He discovers werewolves are involved – they're the victims. Loose adaptation of book #2 of The Dresden Files, Fool Moon.
4	"Rules of Engagement"	Michael Grossman	Curtis Kheel	February 18, 2007	102	1.41
As Harry attempts to save the latest damsel in distress from a vicious Hellion, he finds they share a surprising connection.
5	"Bad Blood"	Rick Rosenthal	Jack Bernstein	February 25, 2007	107	1.12
Bianca (guest star Joanne Kelly), the most beautiful—and most dangerous—vampire in Chicago hires Dresden. Someone is trying to kill her, and she needs Dresden to find out who and why.
6	"Soul Beneficiary"	Ken Girotti	Peter Egan	March 4, 2007	108	0.94
When a man who has been having premonitions that he's about to die drops dead in Dresden's office, Harry is plunged into a bizarre murder plot that ends up revealing a dark secret from Bob's past.
7	"Walls"	John Fawcett	Hans Beimler & Robert Hewitt Wolfe	March 11, 2007	106	1.17
Harry investigates a group of thieving college students who have discovered a supernatural method to bypass the most sophisticated of security systems. But there's madness in their method, because it is slowly killing them off, one by one.
8	"Storm Front"	David Carson	Hans Beimler & Robert Hewitt Wolfe	March 18, 2007	101	1.35
A grisly crime scene leads Harry to the middle of a gang war, and a nasty reminder of the perils of black magic. This was edited down from the pilot episode and loosely adapts the plot of the first novel, Storm Front.
9	"The Other Dick"	James Head	George Mastras	March 25, 2007	110	1.00
While taking classes to get his P.I. license, Harry finds his teacher – another local private investigator – murdered using supernatural means. Harry reluctantly joins forces with the deceased teacher's assistant (guest star Claudia Black) to find the killer.
10	"What About Bob?"	David Straiton	David Simkins	April 1, 2007	109	N/A
Harry's latest lover sneaks out of his place with Bob's skull and delivers it to Dresden's uncle Justin Morningway – who died by Dresden's own hand five years ago. Dresden learns that death isn't all it's cracked up to be – especially where his uncle is concerned.
11	"Things That Go Bump"	Michael Grossman	Robert Hewitt Wolfe	April 8, 2007	111	N/A
Ancient Mai and Morgan seek refuge at Dresden's place after they are ambushed by one of Mai's enemies. But once inside, they discover that they're now all trapped by a powerful spell, and the walls are closing in.
12	"Second City"	Nick Copus	Barry M. Schkolnick	April 15, 2007	112	N/A
Minutes after leaving a store, a former gang member is found dead under mysterious circumstances. Meanwhile, Murphy's father comes to Chicago, and he has a bone to pick with her – named Harry Dresden.

== Development ==
In 2005, the SciFi Channel optioned The Dresden Files as a two-hour film and backdoor pilot. Nicolas Cage executive produced alongside Hans Beimler, Robert Hewitt Wolfe, Norm Golightly, and Morgan Gendel. It was produced by Lionsgate Television in association with Cage's Saturn Films. Production began during the Autumn of 2005. Originally, a Summer 2006 release was anticipated, but was delayed to January 2007.

The pilot film was made from a screenplay by television writers Hans Beimler and Robert Hewitt Wolfe, and based on Butcher's novel Storm Front. David Carson directed and shooting took place in Toronto. Paul Blackthorne was cast in the lead role in November 2005. A two-hour pilot was originally intended to serve as the premiere, but certain last minute developmental and casting changes delayed its completion. Episode three (in production order) was aired in its place. Along with the re-shooting of several scenes, the pilot had been cut to an hour and was the eighth episode to air. A third version of the pilot, now movie length, was broadcast late at night on March 7, 2008 by SciFi Channel. Besides restoring cut scenes from the original version of the pilot, it incorporated footage from throughout the season, placing it outside of the main series' continuity.

Most notable in the re-edited version of the pilot was that Bob, played by Terrance Mann in the series as a full apparition, was limited to only a disembodied voice who was centered around the familiar rune covered skull with animated lighting to symbolize the spirit within, more akin to the Bob of the novels. This re-editing was done later in the series as Mann did not join the series until after the original filming of the pilot had already been concluded. The full pilot version of "Storm Front" was not included in the original DVD release of the complete series.

=== Departure from novels ===
In a forum post Jim Butcher said that "the show is not the books. It is not meant to follow the same story. It is meant as an alternate world, where the overall background and story-world is similar, but not all the same things happen. The show is not attempting to recreate the books on a chapter-by-chapter or even story-by-story basis". He continued by saying viewers should not expect a duplicate of the books, and those expecting it would be disappointed.

== Home media release ==
In August 2007, The Dresden Files was released by Lions Gate Entertainment onto DVD.

== In other media ==
In the 2008 film The Eye, Jessica Alba's character is watching television after her sight is restored. An episode of The Dresden Files appears briefly on the television. This appears to be a cross-promotion between Lionsgate Television and Lions Gate Entertainment (the distributor of The Eye).

== See also ==
- List of fiction set in Chicago
- Urban fantasy
- List of fantasy television programs
