= Twelve Months (novel) =

2026 novel by Jim Butcher

- Author: Jim Butcher
- Cover artist: Christian McGrath
- Language: English
- Series: The Dresden Files
- Genre: Detective, Contemporary fantasy, Urban fantasy
- Publisher: Ace Books
- Publication date: January 20th, 2026
- Publication place: United States
- Media type: Hardcover
- Pages: 480
- ISBN: 978-0-593-19935-0
- Dewey Decimal: 813/.6
- LC Class: PS3602.U85 B88 2020
- Preceded by: Battle Ground

Twelve Months is a novel by Jim Butcher and is the 18th novel in The Dresden Files. Twelve Months was published on January 20, 2026 by Ace Books. The book covers the twelve months following the battle of Chicago.

== Plot ==
Three weeks after the Battle of Chicago, Harry Dresden mourns Karrin Murphy. He uses strict exercise to avoid a collapse while his friend Will manages refugees. Harry meets his fiancée, Lara Raith, at McAnally's Pub to discuss their alliance. Lara offers medical aid for Harry's people. Afterward, Queen Mab commands Harry to gain Lara's cooperation and reconcile with King Etri, using Harry's daughter to ensure compliance. Later, a Valkyrie named Bear arrives to defend the castle, and Harry agrees to teach a young mage named Fitz - the former gang member who was able to hear him while he was a disembodied spirit.

Michael Carpenter urges Harry to stay strong. After a refugee thanks him, Harry decides to confront the ghoul threat. Harry learns to crochet and receives parenting advice before declaring Chicago off-limits to the ghoul king. An erotic dream becomes a mental battle where Harry's own psyche shows his state. Later, Harry, Bear, and Fitz are ambushed by ghouls; Harry's magic fails, but the Carpenters help them win. At a party, Lord Drakul challenges the Council while Molly worries Harry wants to die. An appearance by Murphy brings Harry first sleep. Finally, Harry offers protection to minor mages to prevent them from using dark magic.

Harry enjoys Thanksgiving with the Carpenters. Daniel brings news of a problem at St. Mary's. Harry finds a Brotherhood member suffering from a black magic curse. He uses a ritual to remove the pain, recognizing dark times ahead. Queen Mab visits the castle and nearly kills Harry for his behavior toward Lara. Later, Harry and Lara meet to discuss her missing people. Finally, Ebenezar McCoy visits to express regret for his past anger. They mourn Murphy together, and Harry moves Maggie into the castle.

Maggie moves into the castle, enjoying Fitz's magic lessons. Harry explains the philosophy behind spells, leading to a lighthearted family moment. During a happy Christmas, Harry asks Michael to help modify the fortress. On New Year's Eve, Lara shares the history of her Hunger, tracing it to a larval Outsider. Harry realizes he may have control over these entities and proposes a magical test. At a party, Lord Raith warns Harry that Lara will consume him. In a hotel, Harry uses his will to command the smoky entity. He feeds it energy until it is pacified. Later, Harry and Fitz meditate in the cold. Harry admits the truth about Murphy’s death, bonding over shared pain.

More Brotherhood members suffer pain curses. One accuses Harry, but Harry uses a map to find the source at Artemis Bock's bookstore. Harry catches the Kin attempting a dark ritual and stops them, taking their dark journal. He orders them to perform rituals to avoid execution. Daniel Carpenter fights the accuser, Carl, winning and banishing his crew. Harry prepares for the ritual to save Thomas. He speaks to Murphy's shade one last time and she tells him that her one regret is not pursuing a relationship with him sooner. After they both make their peace, Harry chooses to let her go. Lara admits she hasn't needed to feed since Harry pacified her Hunger. They fly to Demonreach, where Thomas chooses to keep his demon, hoping to help Justine later.

Harry watches Maggie ride her bike, finally accepting he must live for his daughter. The castle's gargoyles, led by Basil, pledge to protect the residents, which Harry accepts. Protesters gather outside. Harry meets Sanya and Butters to express regret for his past behavior, restoring their bond. Lara meets with Etri, who demands an apology. Harry offers another path and tests the ritual on Lara, leaving them both drained. Queen Mab arrives, revealing she used Harry to make Lara's Hunger dependent on his magic. Furious at being used again, Harry attacks her, but she just laughs at his blossoming ruthlessness. Molly admits she knew the plan, but was unable to tell him as Mab had ordered her not to. Harry, Molly, and Bear use a trick to drive away raiding Wardens, saving Bock.

Harry introduces the gargoyles to the children. A refugee calls him a gentle man. Harry performs a spell to say goodbye to Murphy. Mort admits he brought Fitz to help Harry heal. Harry and Lara recognize they are Mab's pawns and share a soulgaze, seeing Lara as a deadly predator. Fitz wins in his session, and Harry gives him a contact for help. Michael shows Harry his new suite. On the equinox, Harry summons Mab for a meal. He asks her to help save Thomas and address the debt with Etri. Protests turn violent as others incite the crowd. At Demonreach, Mab slows time while Harry's spirit battles Thomas's Hunger. Harry feeds the entity life energy and restarts Thomas's heart. Justine is brought forth, and Mother Summer assists with the birth of Thomas's son. To end the feud, Mab takes the child to be raised by the Svartalves, an act that badly strains the relationship between Harry and Thomas. Justine is taken to Arctis Tor in order to begin freeing her of the "Nemesis" entity that has possessed her.

Two weeks later, Harry receives a message from Drakul warning him that the castle is about to be attacked. Moving all the refugees to the basement, he discovers that vampires of the Black and White Courts have banded with the ghouls for this assault and enlisted a mob of civilians. Harry taps into the castle's ley lines in order to project an enormous illusion of his face that scares the civilians away, then defends the roof while Fitz holds the stairs. Led by Mavra, the Black Court vampires and their thralls demolish the castle's front gate and storm in. Lara and her sisters join the fight, as do Warden Carlos Ramirez, Bear, and the gargoyles; they and Harry obliterate the attackers, but Mavra escapes.

After the battle, Mab agrees to postpone the wedding of Harry and Lara until the autumnal equinox. Harry reflects on his ability to find peace and happiness even in the turbulent times he has faced. Thomas arrives for a visit, bringing Harry's beloved Volkswagen Beetle - now fully restored after having been crushed by a demon - and the brothers reconcile.

== Reception ==
Publishers Weekly wrote that Twelve Months “shifts gears” to a more intimate, year‑long focus on Harry Dresden’s grief and recovery while still juggling high‑stakes threads, deeming it not ideal for newcomers but a more optimistic outing for invested readers. AudioFile Magazine praised James Marsters’s audiobook narration, noting his delivery and tone which elevates the book’s quieter, introspective stretches, calling the performance "a compelling entry in the series".

It won the 2026 Dragon Award for Best Fantasy Novel.
