= Blood Rites (novel) =

Book by Jim Butcher

- Blood Rites
- Author: Jim Butcher
- Language: English
- Series: The Dresden Files
- Genre: Detective, Contemporary fantasy, Urban fantasy
- Publisher: Roc Paperback
- Publication date: August 3, 2004
- Publication place: United States
- Media type: Paperback
- Pages: 372
- ISBN: 0-451-45987-3
- OCLC: 56017751
- LC Class: CPB Box no. 2274 vol. 15
- Preceded by: Death Masks
- Followed by: Dead Beat

Blood Rites is the 6th book in The Dresden Files, Jim Butcher's continuing series about wizard detective Harry Blackstone Copperfield Dresden.

== Plot summary ==
After accidentally acquiring a stray puppy from a kidnapped litter of Tibetan temple dogs, Harry Dresden accepts a job from his White Court acquaintance, Thomas Raith, to investigate a series of deaths on a pornography film set led by director Arturo Genosa. After an entropy curse arrives and almost kills two more people, Lara Raith, another White Court vampire, appears as a replacement actress, discovers Dresden's presence, and soon decides to kill both Harry and Thomas for being involved. However, a surprise Black Court attack forces a truce between them and they flee to the Raith's Chicago mansion for safety. There, Dresden learns that Thomas is his half-brother and escapes an assassination attempt by Lord Raith, Thomas' and Lara's father. Soon after, Dresden finds a pattern to the curses and prepares a counterattack, but one of Genosa's ex-wives prevents him from saving the next target and frames him for the woman's death. He escapes and works out that all of Genosa's ex-wives are behind the curse, with Lord Raith supporting them. Before the next curse can be unleashed against him, Dresden calls upon Murphy to help him stop Lord Raith and maneuvers Lara to save them all from her father.

At the same time, Harry has discovered a newly established nest of Black Court vampires, led by a very old and dangerous vampire named Mavra. To wipe out the nest before it becomes entrenched, he enlists the help of his friend Karrin Murphy, the mercenary Jared Kincaid, and his mentor Ebenezar McCoy, discovering that Kincaid and McCoy have already met. Despite almost getting blown up and burned to death, the crew successfully battle Mavra, destroy the nest, and rescue the children that had been taken as hostages. At the end, Thomas saves Harry by paying Kincaid's fee using his entire savings.

== Synopsis ==
Dresden and Thomas, after meeting for dinner, rescue a litter of pups from a group of demon gorillas, and deliver them to Brother Wang, their owner, just as he is leaving. On the ride home Dresden finds another pup hiding in the car, who alerts Dresden to a vampire attack. Thomas introduces Dresden to a friend, Arturo Genosa, who produces erotic films. Arturo, who believes someone is out to kill him, suspecting them to be a strega, or a practitioner of Italian folk witchcraft. He hires Dresden to investigate the suspicious deaths of two women he feels were killed in his place. Dresden will pose as a production assistant to investigate and apprehend the murderer along with Thomas.

Deciding that the Black Court vampires need to be killed as quickly as possible, Dresden enlists Murphy to help him hunt down and destroy the vampires. He also hires Kincaid, and later calls on Ebenezar McCoy to be a wheelman and counter Mavra's magic. The next day, Dresden shows up early at the film studio. When the next curse hits the studio, Dresden is able to intervene and save the lives of two of the stars, but they are badly hurt and electrically scarred. Dresden realizes that Arturo is not the target of the curses, but rather the women in his life. Later, while collecting information, someone tries to murder Dresden with a blowgun dart.

One of the replacement actresses is the attractive Lara Romany (Lara Raith, a White Court vampire), along with her sister, Inari, and Thomas. Seeing a form flee the studio, Dresden gives chase and tackles Thomas. Thinking Thomas is using Dresden as a cats-paw, Dresden beats Thomas badly and is ambushed by Lara. She shoots Thomas. Before she can shoot Dresden, they are jumped by Mavra's minions. They escape, but Thomas is dying, as he used up his energy reserves in the fight. Inari's arm is shattered. Lara and Dresden evacuate them to the Raith mansion for medical attention. Lara offers Dresden the hospitality and protection of her home. Lord Raith, her father and the King of the White Court vampires, is not bound by her word. Later, Raith sends a drugged Inari to feed on Dresden, but she is burned by touching him.

Thomas arrives just in time to hustle Inari away and explains that Dresden is still protected by Susan's love. In Lord Raith's gallery, he shows Dresden the painting of their mother, Margaret Gwendolyn LeFay. Thomas is Dresden's half-brother, which Harry does not believe. Still disbelieving, Dresden soulgazes Thomas. During the soulgaze, they both receive a planted message from their mother: help each other. Dresden agrees to help Thomas save Inari from Lord Raith, learning that, if Inari falls truly in love before she feeds, the vampire curse will be lifted, and she will never become a White Court Vampire.

The next morning, Dresden meets Kincaid and Lt. Murphy to coordinate the raid on Mavra before hurrying back to the studio to prevent the next curse. He drafts Jake into helping draw a magical lightning rod. Jake mentions that Arturo is getting married for the fourth time. Dresden confirms with Murphy that Arturo has a marriage license for Thursday. The fax is blurred, so she cannot read the name of the bride-to-be. Unlike the prior three wives, this Mrs. Genosa was not required to sign a pre-nuptial agreement. If Arturo dies, she will inherit everything, which is the motive for trying to kill her before she can marry Arturo. Trixie then surprises Dresden at gunpoint, so he cannot interfere with the curse, and Trixie has destroyed his spell shield. Dresden is facing not one, but three Strega. Trixie and her co-conspirators, Arturo's other ex-wives Madge and Lucille, have no idea who Arturo is marrying, so they are killing all the women around him. The next curse will kill Emma. Desperate to save her, Dresden jumps Trixie. She fires wildly, killing Emma.

Trixie thrusts the gun into Dresden's hand and screams that he killed Emma. The entire cast and crew see him holding the gun. Dresden flees, handing the gun off to Joan as he runs out the door, giving her a brief synopsis of what Trixie has done. Back at his apartment, Bob gives Dresden the location and a site map of the vampire hideout in a homeless shelter. He and Ebenezar pick up Murphy from her family picnic and rendezvous with Kincaid. Kincaid and Ebenezar know each other from before, and share mutual hatred. Although they almost erupt into violence, they give their word to Dresden for a temporary truce until they can shut down Mavra and her scourge. Impersonating Red Cross workers, Kincaid and Murphy evacuate the homeless people and shelter staff from the ground floor. Ebenezar keeps the truck running while they go into the basement lair, finding a group of imprisoned children. Mavra and her henchmen ambush them with flamethrowers, setting the building on fire. Dresden's shield keeps the flamethrower from physically reaching them, but it fails to stop the intense heat from passing through, and incinerates his left hand. Dresden sends the flame back at the vampires, and he and Kincaid manage to overpower them. Gathering the children, they flee the burning building.

Kincaid leaves, giving Dresden three days to pay him or die. Murphy and Dresden take the rescued children to Fr. Forthill. Ebenezar explains that a Blackstaff is the White Council's assassin, allowed to break the Laws of Magic as he sees fit to protect the Council. Also, he tells Dresden that his mother, Margaret LeFay, was his apprentice. And finally, Margaret was murdered by Lord Raith, but that Raith is spectacularly protected from magic, and even Margaret's death curse didn't seem to do anything.

Dresden coopts Lara to overthrow her father, and finds Madge and Trixie with Raith and Thomas in the Deeps. They plan to sacrifice Thomas to kill Dresden with a final curse, freeing Lord Raith from Margaret's death curse, which has prevented Raith from feeding for years, leaving him extraordinarily weak. Madge kills Trixie with a spell, then summons He Who Walks Behind to kill Dresden, but the spell is interrupted, and the Outsider kills Madge, fleeing into the night. Lara arrives, and enthralls Raith, who is too weak to defend himself. She makes her father into a puppet, so their enemies won't see any weakness in House Raith or the White Court. Banished from House Raith, Thomas moves into Dresden's apartment and pays off Dresden's debt to Kincaid as thanks for saving his life. Dresden decides to keep the puppy, naming it Mouse, and learns from Bob that his previous touching of a Denarian coin has given him access to powerful Hellfire magic.

== Introduced characters ==
- Mouse: Dresden's Tibetan Temple dog.
- Arturo Genosa: a porn film producer and revolutionary, and a friend of Thomas Raith.
- Jake Guffey: AKA Jack Rockhardt, an aging porn actor in his late thirties and survivor of curse number three.
- Bobby: an up-and-coming porn actor on his second film shoot.
- Joan Dallas: the producer and jill of all trades.
- Madge Shelly: AKA Elizabeth Guns, a porn actress and Arturo's first ex-wife.
- Lucille Delarossa: AKA Raven, a porn actress and Arturo's second ex-wife.
- Tricia Scrump: AKA Trixie Vixen, the starlet of Arturo’s porn film and his third ex-wife.
- Giselle: a porn actress and survivor of curse number three.
- Emma: a porn actress, single mother of two, and the target of curse number five.
- Lara Raith: a White Court vampire and the most favored child of the White King. She becomes the power behind the throne at the end of this book.
- Inari Raith: the youngest child of the White King. At the start of the book she doesn't realise that she and her family are vampires, but Dresden makes Lara promise to tell her the truth. She accidentally became the target of curse number four but survived.
- Lord Raith: the king of the White Court vampires. He suffers from Margaret Gwendolyn LeFay's death curse which prevents him from feeding.
