= Proven Guilty =

Novel by Jim Butcher

- Author: Jim Butcher
- Cover artist: Christian McGrath
- Language: English
- Series: The Dresden Files
- Genre: Detective, Contemporary fantasy, Urban fantasy
- Publisher: Roc Hardcover
- Publication date: May 2, 2006
- Publication place: United States
- Media type: Hardcover
- Pages: 406
- ISBN: 0-451-46085-5
- OCLC: 176919800
- Preceded by: Dead Beat
- Followed by: White Night

Proven Guilty is the 8th book in The Dresden Files, Jim Butcher's continuing series about wizard detective Harry Blackstone Copperfield Dresden. It had a release date of May 2, 2006.

Harry Dresden has spent years being watched and suspected by the White Council's Wardens, but now he is a Warden, and it's a worse role than he thought. When movie monsters start coming to life on his watch, it's officially up to him to put them back where they came from. Only this time, his client is the White Council, and his investigation cannot fail - no matter who falls under suspicion, no matter the cost.

The cover art by illustrator Christian McGrath depicts Harry on a street corner with his glowing staff. On Butcher's website, the first 3 chapters may be previewed.

== Plot summary ==
Nearly a year after the events in Dead Beat, Warden Harry Dresden attends the trial and execution of a sixteen-year-old Korean boy for mentally controlling his friends and family. After the execution, Ebenezar McCoy asks Dresden to discover why the Summer and Winter Fae have not attacked the Red Court vampires, and the Gatekeeper secretly requests that Dresden investigate the use of black magic in Chicago. Back at home, Molly Carpenter summons him to the police station to bail out her boyfriend, Nelson. Molly asks Dresden to help Nelson, because she believes him to be innocent.

Harry soon finds himself investigating strange attacks happening at "SplatterCon!!!", a horror movie convention Molly and Nelson had worked at. During this investigation, he discovers that phobophages—supernatural predators from the spirit world who feed on fear—are behind the attacks, and sets out to stop them by turning them back on whoever is summoning them. After a meeting with the Summer Knight and both the Summer and Winter Ladies, he discovers that the reason Summer has not attacked the Red Court is due to their fear of an impending attack by Winter. He also learns that Mab has been acting strangely as of late.

After fighting off phobophages in the shape of a xenomorph and a horror-movie slasher, he manages to send the remainder to the source of their crossing. Before he can investigate, he and Officer Rawlins of the Chicago PD are taken captive by Madrigal Raith, Thomas's cousin, who has learned to feed off of fear himself. Escaping with the help of Mouse and Thomas, they have a narrow run-in with an incredibly powerful phobophage in the form of a scarecrow before Harry discovers that he had inadvertently sent the other phobophages after Molly, and they have taken her to the Nevernever.

Teaming up with Karrin Murphy, Molly's mother Charity, Summer Lady Lily, and Summer Knight Fix, Harry leads an assault on Arctis Tor—the Winter stronghold, which seems to have been the site of a recent battle. Fighting their way through more phobophages, Harry and Charity engage in a final showdown with the scarecrow phobophage, now revealed to be a powerful servant of the Winter Court known as a fetch. During the conflict, Harry blasts the Winter wellspring with Summer fire provided by Lily, causing every Winter Fae in the realm to rush to Arctis Tor's defense. The group narrowly escape with their lives.

Retreating to the sanctuary of St. Mary's, Harry confronts Molly about her use of magic, informing her that she has broken the White Council's laws and that he must take her in for trial, though he promises to stand by her. The Merlin takes control of the votes of several absent Senior Council members and orders Molly's execution, but Harry stalls the trial with help from the Gatekeeper to allow Michael Carpenter to arrive. He is accompanied by the absent members, who explain that Michael saved both their lives and those of a platoon of Warden trainees. They vote to place Molly under the Doom of Damocles and assign Harry as her mentor.

With the conflict behind them for now, Harry takes Molly back to the Carpenter home and sets about teaching her how to control her magic. Later, he and McCoy compare notes on the recent happenings. They agree that an unknown group, which Harry dubs the "Black Council," has been orchestrating events from a safe distance for several years. Furthermore, they conclude that the attack on the trainees points to the presence of a traitor among the ranks of the White Council, possibly within the Senior Council itself. Harry learns that Murphy has been demoted and removed from command of Special Investigations for abandoning her post to help him rescue Molly.

== Characters ==
- Darby Crane: horror movie director/producer, a disguise for Madrigal Raith, a White Court vampire feeding on fear.
- Lucius Glau: Crane's lawyer and a jann (child of a djinn and a mortal).
- Detective Sgt. Greene: homicide detective assigned to investigate one of Harry's cases, a skeptic about magic.
- Nelson: young drug addict whom Molly ensorcells to be afraid of narcotics to help him end his addiction.
- Rosie Marcella: young (and pregnant) drug addict whom Molly ensorcells to be afraid of narcotics so that her addiction will not harm her baby.
- Lydia Stern: news reporter for the Midwestern Arcane and successor to Susan Rodriguez.
