= Storm Front (novel) =

2000 fantasy novel by Jim Butcher

- Author: Jim Butcher
- Cover artist: Lee MacLeod
- Language: English
- Series: The Dresden Files
- Genre: Detective, Contemporary fantasy, Urban fantasy
- Publisher: Penguin Putnam
- Publication date: April 1, 2000
- Publication place: United States
- Media type: Print (paperback) & AudioBook (Audio cassette & Audio CD)
- Pages: 322 pp (first edition, paperback)
- ISBN: 0-451-45781-1 (first edition, paperback)
- OCLC: 43892393
- LC Class: CPB Box no. 1853 vol. 11
- Followed by: Fool Moon

Storm Front is a 2000 fantasy novel by American writer Jim Butcher. It is the first novel in The Dresden Files, his first published series, and it follows the character of Harry Dresden, professional wizard. The novel was later adapted into a pilot for a SyFy channel television series, though Jim Butcher felt the writers were not attempting to recreate the novel on a "chapter by chapter or even story by story basis".

== Plot summary ==
Harry Dresden, Chicago's only professional wizard, accepts a case from Monica Sells. Her husband, Victor, a man obsessed with the occult, has been acting increasingly erratic, his once-gentle demeanor replaced with a chilling paranoia. Shortly after Monica leaves, Harry is called by his ally in the Chicago Police Department, Lt. Karrin Murphy, to consult on a bizarre case: a couple died in an upscale hotel room by magical means: their hearts literally exploded out of their chests. The man worked as a bodyguard for Chicago's reigning crime boss, "Gentleman" Johnny Marcone; the woman was an exclusive escort.

Harry is troubled because the White Council - the governing body of wizards - will immediately fasten on him as the obvious suspect for the murders. He had killed his evil mentor with magic as a teenager, breaking the first Law of Magic and would have been killed on the spot, but the Council had ruled his actions as self-defense and warned him that any further offenses will result in his death. Morgan, a Warden representing the Council, has already warned him that he "knows" Harry is responsible and will execute him as soon as he uncovers proof.

Harry has separate confrontations with Marcone and Bianca, a vampire who runs the escort service the murdered woman worked for. Neither of them admit responsibility, but Marcone says a new drug called "Three Eye" making an impact on Chicago's streets is not made by his organization, but may be the work of a rogue magician. While these acts of magic would normally be impossible for one man, Harry eventually realizes that the sorcerer is syphoning energy from the recent storms to supercharge his spells.

After a series of magical assassination attempts, Harry eventually identifies Victor Sells as the self-taught sorcerer behind Three Eye and the recent murders. He began as a harmless collector of arcane artifacts, but eventually became drunk with power, using magic to seize control of Chicago and killing anyone he perceived was in his way, including Marcone's men and Monica's own sister. Monica had hired Harry because she was worried Victor might eventually go after their children.

The final confrontation takes place at Sells's country home. Despite his power, Sells is still an amateur and proves unable to control the demonic forces he summons to combat Harry. The mansion burns down with Sells inside, and a weakened Harry is almost killed as well but saved by Morgan, who was forced to admit that Harry was not responsible for the murders and Harry's postponed execution is lifted.

Harry is able to report a successful solution to the mystery to Murphy, but knows that Sells's actions have stirred up conflicts in the Chicago area that he will need to watch out for.

== Characters ==
- Harry Dresden: the protagonist, a professional wizard, and the only one listed in the phone book.
- Monica Sells: one of Dresden's clients and the wife of Warlock Victor Sells.
- Lieutenant Karrin Murphy: director of Special Investigations, Chicago PD.
- Detective Ron Carmichael: Murphy's partner at SI.
- Jennifer Stanton: an employee of the Velvet Room and Monica Sells' sister.
- Tommy Tomm: a bodyguard for Gentleman Johnny Marcone.
- Gentleman Johnny Marcone: the lord of the Chicago underworld.
- Hendricks: a bodyguard for Gentleman Johnny Marcone.
- Spike: a man of Marcone's.
- Mac: the owner and operator of McAnally's tavern.
- Susan Rodriguez: a reporter at the Midwestern Arcane, and Dresden's love interest.
- Toot-Toot: a dewdrop faerie who helps Dresden.
- Warden Donald Morgan: a law enforcement warden for the White Council, who has a mandate to aid the innocent and punish the guilty.
- Mister: Dresden's 30+ pound house cat.
- Bob: an intelligent air spirit who resides inside a skull in Dresden's sub-basement laboratory.
- Madame Bianca St. Claire: the owner of the Velvet Room and a Red Court vampire.
- Linda Randall: a former employee of the Velvet Room, the Beckitt's chauffeur, friend and sometime lover to Jennifer Stanton.
- The Beckitts: a rich couple who provide money for Victor Sells.
- Donny Wise: a photographer for a local adult magazine.
- Victor "Shadowman" Sells: the villain of the novel, who is a warlock and Monica Sells' husband.
- Jenny and Billy Sells: children of Monica and Victor Sells.

== In other media ==
- The plot of the novel was condensed into a 90-minute prospective television pilot for the Sci Fi Channel, and edited and aired as a later episode in the first season. In the episode, Victor’s motivation to murder via black magic stems from grief—stricken rage over the untimely death of his daughter Grace. Grace inherited her father’s magical abilities and became addicted to the art of dark magic, eventually dying after summoning a deceitful spite demon (who later in turn is summoned by Victor, who ends getting killed as well). Jenny and Billy are absent, to illustrate Monica and Victor’s fractured marriage over Grace’s death.
- The novel has been adapted into an eight-issue comic book mini-series, adapted by Mark Powers and illustrated by Ardian Syaf and Brett Booth.
