= First Lord's Fury =

2009 novel by Jim Butcher

- First Lord's Fury
- Author: Jim Butcher
- Cover artist: Steve Stone
- Language: English
- Series: Codex Alera
- Genre: High fantasy
- Publisher: Ace Books
- Publication date: November 2009
- Publication place: United States
- Media type: Print (hardback & paperback)
- OCLC: 213308637
- Preceded by: Princeps' Fury

First Lord's Fury is a 2009 high fantasy novel by American writer Jim Butcher. It is the sixth and final book of the Codex Alera novel series.

For years, he has endured the endless trials and triumphs of a man whose skill and power could not be restrained. Battling ancient enemies, forging new alliances, and confronting the corruption within his own land, Gaius Octavian became a legendary man of war – and the rightful First Lord of Alera.

But now, the savage Vord are on the march, and Octavian must lead his legions to the Calderon Valley to stand against them – using all of his intelligence, ingenuity, and furycraft to save their world from eternal darkness.

== Plot ==
Returning from the ruined continent of Canea, Gaius Octavian, his betrothed Kitai, the Canim warmaster Varg, and their legions find that most of the Aleran Empire has been destroyed or besieged by the insect-like Vord, a monstrous race led by a single sentient Queen that consumes everything they come across. Most of the Aleran resistance is based in the city of Riva, on the far eastern end of the continent. Octavian and his troops have landed on the northern edge and need to find a way to meet up with the other Aleran nobles in Riva. Meanwhile, Aquitainus Attis, who has been named First Lord in Octavian's absence, has given the order to salt the earth between Riva and the Vord, slowing the vord's approach.

After making landfall outside of the city of Antillus, Octavian begins preparations for his march to Riva. However, the Vord queen makes an appearance via watercraft projection, making essentially a hologram of herself out of every pool of water large enough to hold it, all across the continent. She states that her victory is inevitable and that she will accept any Aleran that wishes to surrender and allow them to live out the remainder of their life in peace provided they do not have any children. Octavian then uses the same watercrafting tactic to announce his arrival on the Aleran continent and give a morale boosting speech. Meanwhile, his aircrafting knights use their abilities to fly in and evacuate an occupied village from under the Queen's nose. In retribution, the Queen kidnaps Octavian's mother, Isana, as well as Araris Valerian, Isana's lover and the most skilled swordsman in the realm.

To make the march across the continent, Octavian receives help from the great fury Alera and the northern icemen to coat the north in a thick layer of ice, as well as cause hurricane strength winds that constantly blow east. He has his engineers rig their ships with steel keels and support struts, so that they can sail across the ice like giant sleighs. While Octavian's forces are on the march, Riva falls to the Queen's onslaught. Her vast number of troops are bolstered by the feral furies of all the Alerans the Vord have slain, and Aquitainus is forced to retreat and evacuate civilians to the Calderon valley, where Bernard and Amara, Octavian's uncle and his wife, have been fortifying the valley in preparation for the Vord. During the assault, Aquitainus makes a show of claiming new furies to bolster his power in an attempt to draw out his wife Invidia, who had betrayed Alera and joined the Vord Queen and become the Queen's right hand. He succeeds but loses the ensuing fight, and is mortally wounded while Invidia escapes.

During Octavian's march, one of his military advisers, Marcus, is revealed to be Fidelias, one of Octavian's grandfather's spies who had been a double agent for Invidia and caused a lot of deaths in previous books. Fidelias, who as Marcus had come to redeem himself somewhat, is condemned to death by Octavian. However, instead of immediate execution, Fidelias is allowed to die in Octavian's service, as his skills are too great to waste with the Vord threat. Afterwards, Octavian's force reaches Riva and decides to assault the Vord-occupied city. Octavian uses his strength in furycrafting to bring down the city walls, and after the battle his firecrafters burn the Vord larders, cutting their supply lines to the Calderon valley. Octavian's force then moves to the valley to pin the Vord force between his own legions and the valley's defenders. While marching to the valley, the Queen herself makes an appearance and attacks Octavian's camp. She kills many and wounds Octavian.

Meanwhile the Vord have begun to assault the valley. Invidia goes to Amara in an attempt to betray the Vord Queen, and gives Amara enemy troop compositions and the time of the next attack as proof of her intentions. Later, the remaining High Lords and Ladies gather to assault the Queen with their combined strength, using Invidia's information. However, the Queen expected Invidia's betrayal and prepared for it, and begins slaughtering the attackers. Invidia again turns to the Vord as the Queen forgives Invidia, but Amara manages to assassinate Invidia before she can turn on her fellow Alerans again. The Queen retreats, leading Isana and Araris to lead the survivors to freedom.

The Queen's retreat was caused by the arrival of Octavian and his army, who attack her lair. Octavian and Kitai engage the Queen, leading her towards the mountains. The Queen unexpectedly attempts to take control of the colossal great furies there while simultaneously duelling Octavian and Kitai. Meanwhile, the defenders of the valley are fighting against the endless Vord, and slowly losing. After a protracted battle and managing to interrupt the Queen's attempt to claim the furies, Octavian and Kitai manage to kill the Queen, causing the Vord to become feral without her guidance. The Vord break, and the survivors of the battle rejoice.

After the Vord's defeat, Octavian becomes the First Lord of the realm and marries Kitai, while both of them as well as Octavian's advisers begin rebuilding. The series ends with an opening for sequels, as on the continent of Canea there is a lesser Vord queen to be dealt with, though as she cannot reproduce she will be the very last they have to face. They will also have to deal with the consequences of some of the climate-changing furycrafting Octavian had to perform in order to defeat the primary Queen and save Alera.

== Characters ==
See also Codex Alera characters

- Gaius 'Tavi' Octavian

The main protagonist and heir to the title of First Lord. An extremely powerful furycrafter and talented fighter, but his greatest skill is his cunning.

- Kitai

A Marat and Octavian's love interest, and a powerful furycrafter.

- The Vord Queen

Leader of the Vord hordes, which are otherwise no more intelligent than beasts.

- Varg

Warmaster and leader of the remaining Canim people.

- Bernard

Count of the Caulderon Valley and Octavian's uncle.

- Amara

Countess of the Caulderon Valley.

- Isana

Octavian's mother, and an extremely powerful watercrafter.

== Publication history ==
The book was released in hardcover, audiobook, and ebook formats on November 24, 2009. It was later released in paperback on November 30, 2010.

== Reception ==
Overall the First Lord's Fury was well received.

In a review on a King of the Nerds blog, the author praises Butcher's high action, stating that it "[makes] for a gripping page turner and I can honestly say that I wish it wasn't over".

A Fantasy Book Critic review praised the characterization in this novel and throughout the series as whole, saying they "are a real treat to read".
