= Spider-Man: Down These Mean Streets =

2005 novel by Keith R. A. DeCandido

- Cover to the book
- Author: Keith R. A. DeCandido
- Genre: Superhero fiction Crime fiction
- Publisher: Pocket Star
- Publication date: August 30, 2005
- Publication place: United States
- Media type: Paperback
- Pages: 288
- ISBN: 978-1-4165-0968-4

Down These Mean Streets is a mass market paperback, authored by Keith R. A. DeCandido and starring Spider-Man. It is one of several paperbacks in the Marvel Comics line published by Pocket Star Books. If regarded in Earth-616 canon, the events in the novel take place roughly after Amazing Spider-Man #509.

== Plot introduction ==
The story centers around a mysterious drug known as Triple X that has been giving its users superpowers as well as rendering them mentally and physically unstable. Spider-Man is forced to team with the police to not only protect people from the enhanced users but find the origin of the drug itself. They soon learn that one of Spider-Man's most prominent enemies might be behind the drug but for a grander scheme.

== Reception ==
The book received good reviews from Unreality-sf.net and Spiderfan.org.

== See also ==
- Spider-Man in literature
- Nick Fury, Agent of S.H.I.E.L.D.: Empyre, another novel based on a Marvel comics character
