= Ghost Story (Butcher novel) =

2011 urban fantasy novel by Jim Butcher

- Author: Jim Butcher
- Cover artist: Christian McGrath
- Language: English
- Series: The Dresden Files
- Genre: Detective, Contemporary fantasy, Urban fantasy
- Publisher: Roc Hardcover
- Publication date: July 26, 2011
- Publication place: United States
- Media type: Hardcover
- Pages: 432
- ISBN: 0-451-46379-X
- Preceded by: Changes
- Followed by: Cold Days

Ghost Story is the 13th book in The Dresden Files, Jim Butcher's continuing urban fantasy series about Chicago wizard Harry Dresden.

== Plot summary ==
Immediately following the events of Changes, Harry finds himself between life and the afterlife, where he is informed that there has been an "irregularity" with his death and is given the option to return to Chicago as a spirit and find his killer. He elects to return and heads to the house of an ectomancer who can communicate with ghosts, Mortimer Lindquist, whom Harry had maneuvered into helping him in the past. Harry finds out that he has been dead for six months, and as a spirit, both his access to his magical powers and his ability to interact with the normal world are greatly compromised. Mort initially refuses to aid Harry, but after Harry helps to defend the house against an assault led by a powerful spirit-like entity, Mort reluctantly agrees. Mort and Harry go to Murphy's house, and Harry is subjected to intense questioning by many of his friends and colleagues to verify his identity. Once satisfied, Murphy explains to Harry that the destruction of the Red Court created a worldwide power vacuum, allowing a group called the Fomor to rise to power. He is aided by Waldo Butters, who has built a radio through which Harry can make himself heard and who has also made a "ghost light," powered by Bob the Skull, that renders Harry visible.

The next night, Harry returns to Mort's house to find it destroyed and him gone. Harry tracks down Mort and finds him being tortured by a gang led by the spirit of the Corpsetaker, a necromancer Harry had killed years earlier. She is trying to force Mort's soul out of his body and replace it with her own. Harry summons an army of spirits that had sheltered at Mort's house, storms the hideout through the Nevernever, and takes down its protective wards, allowing his allies to mount a physical assault. Harry returns to confront the Corpsetaker only to discover that she has consumed all of the spirits involved in the strike, increasing her power and giving her the ability to physically manifest - and the ability to steal a body, which she promptly does in the form of Butters. Molly attacks the Corpsetaker, who responds by entering her mind in an attempt to steal her body instead. Harry is quick to follow.

Molly and the Corpsetaker wage a pitched battle for Molly's mind as Harry seeks out Molly's mental command center. He finds it, and in the process unlocks a memory of his own. During Changes, Harry realized not only that he would have to become the Winter Knight in order to save his daughter, but also that Mab would then turn him into a monster. To prevent this from happening, Harry contacted Kincaid and arranged for his own assassination. In order to prevent Mab from discovering this plan, he then had Molly remove the memory of it.

With Harry having remembered the true events that he arranged, Uriel appears and explains that a fallen angel interfered with Harry's death by whispering a lie to him at a critical moment, which motivated Harry to carry out his planned suicide. The fallen angel's direct influence permitted Uriel to respond in kind, allowing Harry to come back and learn the truth. Uriel then offers Harry the choice to come to work for him, or continue on to "What Comes Next." Harry demands to see how his loved ones fare in order to make an informed choice. Uriel complies, showing Harry that Molly has successfully defeated the Corpsetaker with Mort's help, that Maggie has been lovingly adopted by the Carpenters, and that Harry's other loved ones are safe and well. Satisfied by what he sees, Harry elects to move on.

He awakens on Demonreach Island, where his body has lain in the care of Queen Mab and the spirit of Demonreach for the past six months. Mab is simultaneously angry and pleased by Harry's attempt to shirk her service, and tells Harry to prepare himself for her turning him into her creature. Uriel takes this opportunity to officially balance the scales, whispering seven crucial words to Harry as he had promised: "Lies. Mab cannot change who you are." Harry realizes the truth of this and tells Mab that he will be her devoted knight, but will carry out her orders in his own way and not permit her to turn him into her monster.

== Introduced characters ==
- Evil Bob: revealed later in the book to be the part of Bob that Harry ordered him to lock away in Dead Beat - the only way for Bob to do as such was to amputate that part of himself; Evil Bob is the knowledge that Bob removed.

== Ghost Story in other media ==
- In 2011, James Marsters, who had previously recorded all the Dresden Files novels in audio book form, was unavailable to record Ghost Story. He was replaced by John Glover. Four years later, Jim Butcher disclosed that a new release of the Ghost Story audio book would be made available. In a response to fan requests and to bring continuity to the listening experience, James Marsters was brought back to narrate this new audio edition. John Glover's narrated edition was retired.
- This book is available as an e-book in Kindle and Nook formats.
