= Dead Beat (novel) =

2005 fantasy novel by Jim Butcher

- Author: Jim Butcher
- Cover artist: Christian McGrath
- Language: English
- Series: The Dresden Files
- Genre: Detective, Contemporary fantasy, Urban fantasy
- Publisher: Roc Hardcover
- Publication date: May 3, 2005
- Publication place: United States
- Media type: Hardcover
- Pages: 396
- ISBN: 0-451-46027-8
- OCLC: 57069616
- Dewey Decimal: 813/.6 22
- LC Class: PS3602.U85 D43 2005
- Preceded by: Blood Rites
- Followed by: Proven Guilty

Dead Beat is the 7th book in The Dresden Files, Jim Butcher's continuing series about wizard detective Harry Dresden. It is available in print and e-book.

== Plot summary ==
It is three days before Halloween and nearly a year after the events in Blood Rites. Mavra, from the previous novel, orders Dresden to locate The Word of Kemmler for her within three days, or Karrin Murphy will be set up for the murder of one of Mavra's minions last year. Dresden learns that Bob used to belong to Kemmler, the most powerful necromancer in a thousand years, and narrowly survives an encounter with an evil personality hidden within the spirit.

Investigating further, he rescues the medical examiner Waldo Butters from Grevane, a powerful necromancer, at the local morgue. During the encounter he learns of another book: Die Lied der Erlking.

Searching for a copy of this book, he meets Shiela, a helpful clerk with a photographic memory. After a few run-ins with her, she makes it clear that she is actually a shade of the demon Lasciel, implanted in his mind when he picked up Lasciel's coin to save Michael Carpenter's son in Death Masks. Although he refuses to accept her offer of aid in exchange for his soul, she persists in his mind. This arrangement leads him closer and closer to accepting the demon's offer in subsequent books.

With Halloween fast approaching, Dresden learns that three different groups of necromancers are planning to try and use the two books in a ritual that will turn them into a minor god. Seeking to stop the ritual, Harry contacts the White Council and prepares to summon the Erlking himself, to prevent any of the necromancers from doing so. While the summoning goes as planned, the two cloaked figures manage to free the Erlking. With help from a handful of Wardens, Butters, his half-brother Thomas Raith, and a zombiefied Sue the Tyrannosaurus Rex, the now Warden Dresden puts a stop to the necromancers' plans.

When the dust settles, Harry finally has his hand on a copy of The Word of Kemmler. He gives it to Mavra along with a warning: threaten his friends again and he will pull out all the stops, seizing whatever power he can (including the power in the book, Lasciel's coin, and an offer from the Queen of the Winter Court) and make a mission of putting Mavra down for good.

== Introduced characters ==
- Grevane: a necromancer, a past apprentice of Kemmler.
- Artemis Bock: the owner, operator of Bock Ordered Books, a rare book store near the university, just a few blocks from Billy and Georgia's apartment.
- Shiela Starr: an employee at Bock Ordered Books. She has eidetic memory, a total recall of anything she has read. Turns out, she's just a mental image of Harry's, created by the shadow of Lasciel in his mind.
- Malcolm Dresden: Dresden's father, who died when Harry was six.
- Kumori: Cowl's associate and a necromancer, but not one of Kemmler's apprentices.
- Cowl: A necromancer, a past apprentice of Kemmler; he works with Kumori.
- Capiocorpus (Latin: Corpsetaker): AKA Alicia Nelson, a necromancer, who is a past apprentice of Kemmler and an expert in mental magic.
- Li Xian: a ghoul and minion of Capiocorpus.
- The Erlking: master of the Wild Hunt and a powerful High Sidhe of the Wyldfae.
- Carlos Ramirez: a youthful warden, who admires Dresden's approach to many things. He is promoted to regional commander, working out of Los Angeles, CA.
- Anastasia Luccio: the Captain of the Wardens, in charge of the security for the White Council.

== See also ==
- Bibliography of Halloween
