= Furies of Calderon =

2004 fantasy novel by Jim Butcher

- Furies of Calderon
- Author: Jim Butcher
- Cover artist: Steve Stone
- Language: English
- Series: Codex Alera
- Genre: High fantasy
- Publisher: Ace Books
- Publication date: October 2004
- Publication place: United States
- Media type: Print (hardback & paperback)
- Pages: 440
- ISBN: 0-441-01199-3
- OCLC: 55044627
- Dewey Decimal: 813/.6 22
- LC Class: PS3602.U85 F87 2004
- Followed by: Academ's Fury

Furies of Calderon is the first novel in the high fantasy series Codex Alera by Jim Butcher. The novel was first released by Ace Books in the United States as a Hardcover edition on October 5, 2004, followed by a Paperback edition on June 26, 2005. Orbit Books released a paperback edition in the United Kingdom in December 2009. It tells the story of a young boy named Tavi who is the only one without any fury-crafting abilities.

The novel was well received, with critics praising Butcher's take at a more traditional fantasy setting, fast pacing, action, and his characterization of the antagonists.

== Plot ==
The story takes place in the Aleran Empire, which contains "crafters", people who can control the elements: water, air, earth, fire, wood, and metal, through a person's bond with an element's fury.

A young woman named Amara travels with her mentor Fidelias as part of her graduation exercise. Amara is training to become one of the Cursori, messengers and spies for the First Lord of Alera, Gaius Sextus. They infiltrate a camp of mercenaries, when Amara is tricked by a watercrafter named Odiana and betrayed by Fidelias. Odiana is the lover of Aldrick ex Gladius, the greatest swordsman since Araris Valerian, a legendary swordsman who had been in the service of the Princeps of Alera, the First Lord's late son. Amara escapes and makes contact with First Lord Gaius using her aircraft. He instructs her to go to the city of Garrison.

The story switches to a steadholt controlled by Bernard, a man who lost his wife and children and stays with his sister Isana, and their nephew Tavi who is furyless. Tavi finds that one of his sheep has gone missing. He and Bernard track the sheep when they are attacked by a Marat warrior. The Marat and the Alerans had fought a war before Tavi was born in which the Marat killed Gaius' son, Princeps Septimus. The Marat are a warrior people who form tribes based on bonds with different animals, for example horses. In the fight, Tavi and Bernard kill the warrior's war bird but not before Bernard is wounded. Tavi is running for help when a furystorm hits. While seeking shelter, he finds Amara and the two find the Princeps Memorial, a cave dedicated to Princeps Septimus. Bernard makes it back to his steadholt, where Isana uses her watercrafting skills to heal him. Bernard then finds Tavi and Amara and brings them back to the steadholt. Fidelias, Odiana, and Aldrick stay at the steadholt where they discover Amara and attempt to capture her. Amara and Tavi escape with Fade, a slave of the steadholt who is mentally challenged, and together they travel through the woods before Amara splits from the other two.

Tavi and Fade are attacked by Kord, the leader of Kordholt and a slaver. During the fight, Bernard and Amara attack Kord when Fidelias, Odiana, and Aldrick attack. Aldrick kills Kord's son Bittan and after arriving, Isana floods the river. Bernard and Amara go one way; Tavi and Fade a second, and Fidelias and Aldrick another; Isana, Odiana, Kord, and Kord's oldest son Aric are washed to Kordholt. Tavi and Fade are captured by a Marat Headman named Doroga. Odiana and Isana, captured by Kord, are locked away and Odiana is raped. Bernard and Amara continue to Garrison where they rouse the Legionares. Fidelias and Aldrick go to the Marat leader Atsurak, who decides to invade Garrison immediately. Tavi convinces Doroga to let him undergo a trial that can stop the attack on Garrison. Tavi faces the trial with Kitai, Doroga's daughter, and wins, saving Kitai's life in the process, and undergoing some sort of bond with her which changes the colour of her eyes to match his, although he does not understand the meaning of this change.

Isana and Odiana convince Aric to help them escape Kordholt, and they split up and head to Garrison. Tavi and the Marat head to Garrison to stop Atsurak. Bernard and Amara hold off the Marat, while realising their feelings for one another, and Isana arrives and hides. Tavi and Doroga attack and kill Atsurak, and Tavi reunites with Bernard and Isana. They are attacked by Fidelias and Aldrick, who defeat Bernard and Amara with ease. Fade then attacks Aldrick, defeats him, and leaves him alive. It is hinted here that Fade is Araris Valerian. Fidelias throws Fade off the wall, attacks Tavi, and takes Aquitaine's dagger.

Garrison survived the attack and Tavi is granted a scholarship to the Academy by the First Lord. Bernard and Amara become Count and Countess of the garrison, and Isana is given the title of Steadholder, making her the first woman ever to own a steadholt and gain citizenship through merit rather than marriage.

Fidelias and Aldrick return to Aquitaine, greeted by Invidia, Aquitaine's wife and discover Aquitaine sleeping with Gaius' wife Caria.

== Characters ==
See also Codex Alera characters

- Tavi

He is a main protagonist, who is orphaned and raised by his Uncle Bernard and Aunt Isana. He has no abilities to craft "furies". Butcher mentioned in a Reddit AMA that he'd written Tavi to be the polar opposite of his popular character Harry Dresden from the Dresden Files.

- Fidelias

Formerly Cursor Callidus, mentor and teacher to Amara, now a traitor to the crown.

- Gaius Sextus

First Lord of Alera, and the strongest Fury crafter. Butcher revealed that the character had been influenced by "a slew of reasonably good Roman Emperors and Erwin Rommel".

- Bernard

Steadholder of Bernardholt, and former legionnaire. He is the uncle of Tavi, and brother of Isana.

- Amara

Another protagonist, also a Cursor and strong windcrafter.

- Isana

A powerful watercrafter. She is the aunt of Tavi and sister of Bernard.

== Publication history ==
=== Hardcover and paperback ===
The novel was first released by Ace Books in the United States as a Hardcover edition on October 5, 2004, though a Hardcover Bargain Price Edition was already available on October 1. An author signed paperback edition was also published on January 1, 2005. It was followed by a Paperback edition on June 26 the same year. A Paperback edition with an updated cover art was published in the United Kingdom by Orbit Books in December 2009.

=== Audiobook ===
An unabridged audiobook edition of the novel was released by Penguin Audio on November 26, 2008. It was followed by the release of an audio CD on December 1.

In August 2016, an unabridged audiobook was published by Hachette Audio UK, which was narrated by Kate Reading.

=== Ebook ===
An Ebook version published by Ace Books was available via Amazon Digital Services LLC on the initial release date. It peaked at number 16 on Amazon Books' Greek & Roman category, and at 19 on the Kindle Store's category of the same name.

Another version was published by Orbit Books in May 2009, also available via Amazon Digital Services LLC.

== Reception ==
Furies of Calderon was well received by critics.

Writing for The Independent (St. George, Utah), Rich Rogers awarded the novel 5 out 5 stars, calling it a great epic fantasy that stands on its own without borrowing from the usual fantasy tropes. He lauded Jim Butcher's successful turn at the fantasy genre in a more traditional setting, and praised the complex characterization of the antagonists.

Reviewing the Audiobook, Gil T. Wilson of the SF Site praised the novel and the series, noting that if the first book was any indication, Codex Alera would prove to be a great fantasy series. She concluded by advising readers to be prepared for a fun read that would have them running through an emotional gamut.

David Stoit of Fantasy Book Review criticized Butcher for the style of the book, calling it "naïve", but noted that Butcher had found a "stranger yet satisfying balance" between the characters. He concluded by saying that the novel was a good start to an interesting series.
