= Fool Moon (novel) =

Novel by Jim Butcher

- Author: Jim Butcher
- Cover artist: Lee MacLeod
- Language: English
- Series: The Dresden Files
- Genre: Detective, Contemporary fantasy, Urban fantasy
- Publisher: Penguin Putnam
- Publication date: January 1, 2001
- Publication place: United States
- Media type: Print (paperback) & AudioBook (Audio cassette & Audio CD)
- Pages: 352 pp (first edition, paperback)
- ISBN: 0-451-45812-5 (first edition, paperback)
- OCLC: 45752301
- LC Class: CPB Box no. 1853 vol. 14
- Preceded by: Storm Front
- Followed by: Grave Peril

Fool Moon is a 2001 contemporary fantasy novel by author Jim Butcher. It is the second novel in The Dresden Files, which follows the character of Harry Dresden, present-day Chicago's only advertising professional wizard.

== Plot summary ==
After the events in Storm Front, Kim Delaney, whom Dresden helped learn to control her magical talents, asks Dresden how to create a set of three magical circles which could be used to contain powerful entities. Dresden withholds the information, because such circles are generally used to contain demigods and archangels.

Lt. Karrin Murphy asks Dresden to consult on a homicide, in which the savaged body of a henchman of mobster Johnny Marcone has been found near a group of wolf-like paw prints. They are ordered off the scene by a team of four FBI agents, one of whom shoots at Dresden and Murphy and nearly kills them. Without telling Murphy, Dresden magically follows a blood trace at the scene that leads him to a confrontation with a gang of teenage werewolves and their pack leader, Tera West. After consulting with his oracular skull, Bob, Dresden informs Murphy of the existence of four different types of lupine theriomorphs: classic werewolves, hexenwolves, loup-garous and lycanthropes.

At the police station, Dresden gets a tip from one agent that the Streetwolves biker gang might know something about the murder, and learns that the Streetwolves and their "pack leader", Parker, are lycanthropes. Dresden escapes unscathed, but now the Streetwolves want him dead.

Marcone offers to hire Dresden for protection, but Dresden refuses. On his way out the door, Marcone says that these killings are connected to a millionaire named Harley MacFinn and his Northwest Passage Project. Dresden summons a demon and trades part of his full name for information on MacFinn; before he can investigate further, Murphy arrests him on suspicion of murder. Kim's badly maimed body has been found in MacFinn's apartment next to a summoning circle, whose sketch Dresden had discarded after she showed it to him. A second, damaged circle is found in a heavily fortified room.

Tera frees Dresden and tells him that MacFinn, her fiancé, is a loup-garou, the most dangerous type of werewolf. Unless MacFinn is placed within a containment circle before the next full moon, he will transform and kill again. Dresden was shot during his escape from police custody. Desperate, he calls his sometime-girlfriend Susan Rodriguez, a reporter, and gets her to come pick him up in exchange for an exclusive on the wolf murders.

Ignoring Dresden's warnings, Murphy arrests and jails MacFinn in his human form. Dresden races to the station to get to MacFinn, but the moon rises, and MacFinn changes, slaughtering the suspects in the holding cells, the desk sergeant, and Murphy's staff, including her partner on the force. Dresden drives off MacFinn and goes in search of Marcone. While searching for MacFinn, Dresden is attacked by the Streetwolves. They are interrupted by the FBI agents, and Dresden captures one, learning that the four are hexenwolves. Considering Marcone and his associates to be immune from conventional justice, they are using talismans to transform into wolves and have planned to let the Streetwolves kill Harry while framing them for the other murders, and while using MacFinn to kill Marcone. The agents had sabotaged MacFinn's circle so that the White Council would suspect him as the murderer.

At moonrise, Dresden, Susan, Tera and her pack drive to Marcone's estate to save him from MacFinn. Dresden and his allies are captured by the FBI hexenwolves, now using their framing of various parties to get closer to Marcone, and are thrown into a pit Marcone had prepared to capture the transformed MacFinn, but Marcone, thrown in the pit with them, works together with Dresden to free them. Three of the hexenwolves kill each other, and Murphy kills the fourth as Dresden kills MacFinn. Dresden and Murphy burn the agents' talismans, Susan evacuates the Alphas, and the Chicago police arrest Marcone on general principle, though Dresden predicts that no charges will be filed. Tera, heavily implied to be a wolf that can change into a human, easily accepts that MacFinn had to be killed before he could cause more deaths, and returns to her family in the Northwest.

== Introduced characters ==
- FBI Agent Phil Denton: FBI investigative team leader.
- FBI Agents Deborah Benn, Roger Harris and George Wilson: members of Denton's FBI team.
- Harley MacFinn: a millionaire environmentalist with lupine qualities.
- Tera West: a mysterious woman with lupine qualities and the fiancée of MacFinn.
- The Alphas: a gang of college-age men and women who have werewolf abilities.
- Billy Borden: one of the Alphas.
- Georgia: one of the Alphas.
- The Streetwolves: a Chicago biker gang of lycanthropes.
- Detective Rudolph: a new officer at SI.

== Reception ==
Thomas Wagner, on behalf of sfreviews.net, praised the book: "This is some sick, adrenaline-charged action storytelling, spun with a Hollywood sensibility for maximum endorphin rush. No, it isn't great literature. It's great escapism, a pure roller coaster ride. There's a difference".

For fantasybookreview.co.uk, Bindi Lavelle wrote: "The detective stylings of Fool Moon enriches a plot full of red herrings and clues that only come together in the book's climax; Fool Moon reads like a good detective novel, with magic. For a page turning mix of neo noir and urban fantasy, look no further than Fool Moon".

Victoria Strauss, in a review on sfsite.com, wrote: "Butcher keeps the thrills coming, with plenty of mystery, suspense, and edge-of-your-seat action scenes".

== In other media ==
- The novel has been adapted into an eight-issue comic book mini-series, adapted by Mark Powers and illustrated by Chase Conley.
- The novel was released as an audiobook, narrated by James Marsters.
- Several elements of the novel were used in the episode "Hair of the Dog" of The Dresden Files television series. The four FBI werewolves have been reduced to two; Agent Kelly Raskin and her boyfriend Zachery Bushnell. According to Murphy, Raskin was implied to have turned into a werewolf while investigating mass graves in Bosnia. She suffered a “nervous breakdown” from it, forcing her to temporarily leave the FBI. Further implying that she has gone rogue, Raskin, determined to free herself of her curse, targets several young women, biting and transforming them into werewolves while Zachery hunts and kills them. One of Raskin’s victims is Mina Watkins, who was the eighth girl killed. Mina’s roommate Heather Bram, suspects something is wrong and reaches out to Harry Dresden. Heather is captured by Raskin who bites her, turning her into a werewolf. Heather manages to escape and hides in Dresden’s apartment. During the final confrontation, it is revealed that Bushnell has become a werewolf via wounds he received from Mina. Raskin, in her werewolf form accidentally kills Bushnell - breaking her curse, but at a terrible price. Raskin is committed to an insane asylum with penalty charges from three states on her head. Heather, meanwhile, comes to terms that she is a werewolf and decides to leave Chicago to find herself in her new condition - hopefully proven that she will be different from Raskin.
