= Spider-Man: The Darkest Hours =

2006 novel by Jim Butcher

- Author: Jim Butcher
- Genre: Superhero fiction
- Publisher: Simon & Schuster
- Publication date: June 27, 2006
- Publication place: United States
- Media type: Paperback
- Pages: 304
- ISBN: 1-4165-9476-0
- LC Class: 2007583176

Spider-Man: The Darkest Hours is a novel written by Jim Butcher featuring characters from the Spider-Man Marvel Comics created by Stan Lee and Steve Ditko. The book was first published by the Pocket Books division of Simon & Schuster on June 27, 2006.

== Plot ==
The book opens with Peter Parker being forced to be a substitute basketball coach at the high school where he teaches science. He is challenged by Samuel Larkin, a star basketball player, who refuses to work with the other players. Peter soon finds out that Samuel never got the regular and required vaccines, and will be suspended and therefore unable to play for the rest of the season, making it nigh-impossible to get into a good university. After coaching, Peter returns home to find that Mary Jane Watson got a part as Lady Macbeth, but since the show is playing in Atlantic City, she bought a car, despite not knowing how to drive. As they are discussing Peter teaching her, The Rhino attacks Times Square, and Spider-Man is needed. As he swings to the battle, Felicia Hardy, otherwise known as "The Black Cat", tells him that he is in danger and the Rhino's attack is a trap. Spider-Man swings on, and easily defeats the Rhino. After he knocks him unconscious, the three vengeful siblings of Morlun (Thanis, Malos, and Mortia), appear and say that Spider-Man caused the death of their brother. Spider-Man evades them until a SWAT team appears. In the end, it is Mary Jane who defeats the siblings. Already angry that she can't help Peter like Felicia can, Mary Jane is enraged by what the siblings are putting her husband through. She defeats them by driving into them with her car, distracting them long enough for Spider-Man to banish them to another dimension using three objects that Doctor Strange (who claimed that he could not directly help Spider-Man, for fear of hurting the cosmic balance) had arranged for him to be given.

== Reception ==
A review described Jim Butcher to have managed Spider-Man's character well, but it criticized action in the story and considered 300 pages to be excessive considering the short plot.

== See also ==
- Nick Fury, Agent of S.H.I.E.L.D.: Empyre, another novel based on a Marvel comics character

== Sources ==
- Butcher, Jim (June 2, 2006). Spider-Man: The Darkest Hours. New York: Simon & Schuster. p. 304. ISBN 978-1-4165-9476-5.
