= The Aeronaut's Windlass =

2015 steampunk fantasy novel by Jim Butcher

- Author: Jim Butcher
- Cover artist: Chris McGrath
- Language: English
- Series: The Cinder Spires
- Genre: Steampunk, fantasy
- Published: September 29, 2015
- Publisher: Penguin Books
- Publication place: United States

The Aeronaut's Windlass is a 2015 steampunk fantasy written by Jim Butcher involving steampunk technologies, magical wars, and sapient cats. It is the first book of The Cinder Spires series.

The second book in the series, The Olympian Affair, was published in November 2023.

== Setting ==
The novel takes place on a world in which humans live in "spires," huge cylindrical arcologies 10,000 feet (3,000 meters) tall and 2 miles (3.2 km) across. Back on earth, their world is a place of horrors, full of dangerous beasts that occasionally make their way into the spires.

The technology and culture seem to be similar to 18th century Europe. Technology based around vat-grown crystals allows citizens to create airships that sail the skies, similar to a Golden Age of Sail vessel. These same crystals can be used to generate electricity and power energy-based weapons.

Spire Albion is the central setting, governed by a constitutional monarchy.

== Characters ==
=== Spire Albion ===
- Francis Grimm (human): owner of the airship AMS Predator; Albion privateer. A disgraced former fleet captain with a strong sense of honor.
- Gwendolyn Lancaster (human): heiress to House Lancaster, who owns the vattery that makes crystals—a primary source of power and energy. Leaves home to join the Spirearch's Guard.
- Bridget Tagwynn (human): heiress to her family. The Tagwynn's once-renowned family has been reduced to running a meat vattery. New recruit to the Spirearch's Guard.
- Benedict Sorellin-Lancaster (human): Gwendolyn's cousin; warrior-born (a human with cat-like eyes, preternatural strength and reflexes, and enhanced senses). Guardsman in the Spirearch Guard.
- Rowl (cat): best friend & guard to Bridget; kit and heir to Chief Maul and House of the Silent Paws.
- Addison Orson Magnus Jeremiah Albion aka Addy (human), Spire Albion: monarch (of Spire Albion); dislikes formalities & prefers to be called by his shortened name, Addy.
- Efferus Effrenus Ferus (human): Master Etherealist, mentor to Folly.
- Folly (human): apprentice Etherealist, is generally observed talking to a jar containing many crystals.
- Elias Esterbrook (human): captain of the Armsmen of House Lancaster.
- Byron Creedy (human): Commander (XO) of the AMS Predator.
- Cavallo: Captain of the Spirearch Guard's recruits in training.
- House Nine-Claws, aka Nine-Claws: tribe of cats in Albion's Habble Landing.
- Naun (cat): Chief of Nine-Claws.
- Neen (cat): prince of Nine-Claws; Naun's kit.

=== Spire Aurora ===
- Castillo: Captain of the ASA Itasca.
- Renaldo Espira aka Ren (human): Marine Battalion Commander of the incursion; youngest Major in Auroran history.
- Diego Ciriaco (human): Master Sergeant of the First Auroran Marines; warrior-born.
- Calliope Ransom (human): captain of the Mistshark; Grimm's ex-wife.

=== Other characters ===
- Sycorax Cavendish (human): Etherealist; ally of the Aurorans, although not an inhabitant of Spire Aurora.

== Plot ==
Since time immemorial, the Spires have sheltered humanity, towering for miles over the mist-shrouded surface of the world. Within their halls, aristocratic houses have ruled for generations, developing scientific marvels, fostering trade alliances, and building fleets of Airships to keep the peace.

Captain Grimm is an Albion privateer when his vessel, the Predator, is caught in an Auroran ambush, where its invaluable lift-crystal is damaged.

Gwen, Bridget and Rowl are new recruits in training for the Spirearch's Guard under the supervision of Gwen's cousin, Benedict. Near the end of their training, Spire Albion suffers an attack by the forces of Spire Aurora, who infiltrate Spire Albion disguised as Albion guards attempting to sabotage Albion's crystal-production facilities. Both Captain Grimm and the Spireguard fight groups of invaders, eventually crossing paths when Grimm helps break up a Mexican standoff the Auroran guards found themselves in.

The monarch of Spire Albion, Spirearch Addison Orson Magnus Jeremiah Albion recruits Bridget, Gwen and Benedict to investigate his suspicions of infiltration of Albion by the Auroran forces. He introduces them to Ferus and Folly (etherealists), and contracts Captain Grimm to transport them with the promise of new lift crystals for his damaged ship.

Beginning their investigation, the group quickly discovers disturbances in Habble Landing, a lower level of the spire, where much of the spires' commerce takes place. The group splits up. After entering a tavern, Gwen, Benedict, and Ferus are attacked by a massive silkweaver matriarch, who displays remarkable intelligence for what is supposedly a simple beast.

Meanwhile, Bridget, Rowl and Folly find themselves ambushed by a teeming mass of silkweaver hatchlings, silverfish-like insects with a venomous bite. They are taken prisoner by the Auroran forces and meet Sycorax Cavendish, an Auroran Etherealist. Rowl escapes, & after sending word to Captain Grimm, sets off to challenge the leader of the local cat tribe. Rowl wins, & receives the local tribe's help fighting off the Auroran invaders. Grimm and his crew contact the Verminocitors, a guild that survives by hunting dangerous surface beasts who have made their way into up the spire.

Grimm launches a rescue mission to save their captured comrades, Bridget and Folly. They find adult silkweavers guarding the women, and all seems to be lost until Rowl arrives with a force of 200 cats to turn the tide.

Meanwhile, on Spire Albion, the Auroran forces steal a valuable book known as The Index from a library before setting the library on fire. The Auroran invaders set more firebombs off throughout the predominantly wooden Habble Landing, before escaping on a pirate vessel named the Mistshark, captained by Grimm's ex-wife, Calliope Ransom.

After rescuing Bridget and Folley, Grimm and crew return to the dock just in time to see Mistshark gun down the Predator. Once repaired, the Predator, though not quite at full power, sets off in pursuit. They catch and disable the Mistshark before it can rendezvous with the Auroran fleet. Before they can effect the surrender, they are attacked by the Auroran flagship Itasca. Outgunned by the larger vessel, the Predator flees to Spire Albion, where a handful of Albion fleet ships intercept and give battle to the Itasca.

Emerging victorious from the battle, Grimm's team returns to Spire Albion, to prepare for the upcoming war with Aurora, knowing that a deeper enemy lurks behind the attacks.

== Reception ==
The book was reviewed positively by SFF World, with reviewer Rob B. saying: "I remarked on Twitter that the best storytellers can transfer the joy they had in telling the story to the reader, in that conversation that a book/story is between reader and storyteller. It was very clear that Jim had a great deal of fun writing this one because it was an incredibly fun and engaging story".

The Fantasy Book Review rated it 9.0/10 and wrote: "The first in the Cinder Spires series is a joyously colourful mix between non-standard steampunk and epic fantasy. Swords, magic, guns and soaring sky ships dominate a world cocooned away from an unforgiving environment. Whether you like steampunk or straight fantasy, it can't be denied good writing is good writing and Jim gives it to you in The Aeronaut's Windlass by the shipload".

The Cinder Spires: The Aeronaut’s Windlass was nominated for the 2016 Hugo Award in the Best Novel category.
