= Nick Fury in other media =

Nick Fury outside of comics

Adaptations of Nick Fury in other media
- Original source: Comics published by Marvel Comics
- First appearance: Sgt. Fury and his Howling Commandos #1 (May 1963)

Print publications
- Novel(s): Nick Fury, Agent of S.H.I.E.L.D.: Empyre

Films and television
- Film(s): Iron Man: Rise of Technovore; Avengers Confidential: Black Widow and Punisher
- Television show(s): Nick Fury: Agent of S.H.I.E.L.D.

Since his debut in Sgt. Fury and his Howling Commandos #1 (May 1963), the Marvel Comics superhero Nick Fury has appeared in many different forms of media, including films, television programs and video games.

== Television ==
Nick Fury as depicted in Iron Man (1994).

- Nick Fury appears in Nick Fury: Agent of S.H.I.E.L.D., portrayed by David Hasselhoff.
  - A variant of this character appears in the Marvel Cinematic Universe film Deadpool & Wolverine, portrayed by David MacDonald.
- Nick Fury appears in Iron Man, voiced by Philip Abbott.
- Nick Fury appears in Spider-Man: The Animated Series, initially voiced again by Philip Abbott and later by Jack Angel.
- Nick Fury makes non-speaking cameo appearances in X-Men: The Animated Series.
- Nick Fury appears in the Spider-Man Unlimited (1999) episode "Worlds Apart", voiced by Mark Gibbon.
- Nick Fury appears in X-Men: Evolution, voiced by Jim Byrnes.
- A Nick Fury TV series was considered for development in 2001.
- Nick Fury appears in Wolverine and the X-Men, voiced by Alex Désert. This version is an amalgam of the Earth-616 version and the Earth-1610 version. His patch is on the right eye, and not the left as in most iterations.
- Nick Fury appears in Iron Man: Armored Adventures, voiced by Dean Redman.
- Nick Fury appears in The Super Hero Squad Show, voiced by Kevin Michael Richardson.
- Nick Fury appears in The Avengers: Earth's Mightiest Heroes, voiced again by Alex Désert. This version is depicted as African-American. He's initially the Director of S.H.I.E.L.D. while sporting his classic depiction's hairstyle in season one, and later covertly decides to investigate the Skrulls' invasion while resembling his Ultimate Marvel depiction in season two.
  - Additionally, Jack Fury (also voiced by Désert) is depicted as Nick's father who was a member of the Howling Commandos.
- Chi McBride voices Nick Fury in Ultimate Spider-Man (2012), and would later reprise his role in Avengers Assemble, Phineas and Ferb: Mission Marvel, Hulk and the Agents of S.M.A.S.H., and Lego Marvel Super Heroes: Maximum Overload.
- Nick Fury appears in Marvel Disk Wars: The Avengers, voiced by Hisao Egawa in Japanese and John Eric Bentley in English.
- Nick Fury appears in Lego Marvel Avengers: Loki in Training, voiced by Alex Barima.
- Nick Fury appears in the Moon Girl and Devil Dinosaur episode "Shoot for the Moon", voiced by Samuel L. Jackson.

== Film ==
=== Live-action ===
In the audio commentary of Fantastic Four: Rise of the Silver Surfer, director Tim Story said the script originally contained Nick Fury. The character was reworked into General Hager (portrayed by Andre Braugher), as having Nick Fury would have forced Fox to purchase that character's rights; some of Hager's lines in the film originate from Fury in Ultimate Extinction.

=== Animation ===
- Andre Ware voiced Nick Fury's Ultimate version in the direct-to-video animated features Ultimate Avengers (2006) and Ultimate Avengers 2 (2008).
- Nick Fury appears in Iron Man: Rise of Technovore, voiced by John Eric Bentley in English and Hideaki Tezuka in Japanese.
- Nick Fury appears in Avengers Confidential: Black Widow & Punisher, with John Eric Bentley reprising the role.

=== Marvel Cinematic Universe ===
Samuel L. Jackson as Nick Fury in Iron Man.

Samuel L. Jackson signed a nine-film contract with Marvel to portray Nick Fury in the Marvel Cinematic Universe. After the contract expired, Jackson continued to portray the character in Avengers: Endgame and Spider-Man: Far From Home. Additionally, Jackson reprises his role in guest appearances in two episodes of Agents of S.H.I.E.L.D. and reprises the role in the Disney+ series What If...? and Secret Invasion. In August 2020, actor Jeff Ward revealed that Agents of S.H.I.E.L.D. series writer DJ Doyle had pitched a post-credits scene for the Agents of S.H.I.E.L.D. series finale that was not shot, that featured Ward's character Deke Shaw (introduced in the fifth season) sitting in a S.H.I.E.L.D. office in the alternate timeline he ends the series trapped in, serving as the organization's Director and wearing an eye patch. Ward added, since it was unclear if the alternate timeline's Nick Fury was still alive in the alternate timeline following the events of the seventh season, Deke would have worn it because it felt like "a power and cool thing", with Deke ultimately serving as a partial adaptation of the original version of the character.

== Video games ==
- Nick Fury appears in two The Punisher games:
  - Fury appears as a playable character in The Punisher (1993).
  - Fury appears in The Punisher (2005), voiced by Steve Blum.
- Nick Fury appears in Fantastic Four, voiced by Andre Ware.
- Nick Fury appears in X-Men Legends II: Rise of Apocalypse, voiced by Khary Payton.
- Nick Fury appears in many Spider-Man games. Most of these appearances are based on his Ultimate Marvel incarnation:
  - The Ultimate version of Nick Fury appears in Ultimate Spider-Man (2005), voiced by Dave Fennoy.
  - Nick Fury appears as a non-playable character in Spider-Man: Friend or Foe, voiced by Marc Graue. At the start of the game, he rescues Spider-Man from the P.H.A.N.T.O.M.s and recruits him into S.H.I.E.L.D. to help find the P.H.A.N.T.O.M.s' creator and stop them. He briefs Spider-Man and his team at the beginning of their missions.
  - Nick Fury appears in the PSP and PS2 versions of Spider-Man: Web of Shadows.
  - Nick Fury is mentioned in the final Ultimate segment of Spider-Man: Shattered Dimensions. He ordered his scientists not to experiment with the fragment of the Tablet of Order and Chaos that they found, but they ended up doing so anyway, and tried fusing it with the Carnage symbiote, which allowed him to absorb the fragment's power and break free. Fury called Spider-Man for assistance, but by the time he arrives, most of the Triskelion is already under Carnage's control, and S.H.I.E.L.D. agents are struggling to fight the splintered forms.
  - Nick Fury appears in Spider-Man Unlimited (2014), voiced by John Eric Bentley.
- Nick Fury is a recurring character in Marvel: Ultimate Alliance series:
  - Nick Fury Sr. appears in Marvel: Ultimate Alliance, voiced by Scott MacDonald. When Doctor Doom's Masters of Evil attacks the S.H.I.E.L.D. Helicarrier U.N.N. Alpha, he sends a distress signal to all heroes to come defend the Helicarrier. He is a playable character after completing the game for the first time. He has two costumes based on the mainstream Marvel universe version and two costumes based on the Ultimate Marvel iteration.
  - Nick Fury Sr. appears in Marvel: Ultimate Alliance 2, voiced by David Kaye. His role in Secret War is intact, but he resurfaces when it comes to the Fold and has the heroes evacuate from Negative Zone Prison Alpha so that he can have it self-destruct. When the heroes are in Wakanda, it was discovered that Nick has been absorbed into the Fold. In the final battle, Fury attacks the heroes in his Nanite form using the powers of Electro, Havok, Multiple Man, Firestar, Bishop, and A-Bomb. In both endings, a banner shown across the news reports states that Fury has been pardoned by the President. Upon completing the game, his Nanite form is unlocked as a playable character.
  - Nick Fury Jr. appears in Marvel Ultimate Alliance 3: The Black Order, voiced again by John Eric Bentley.
- Nick Fury appears in the video game adaption of Iron Man 2, voiced by Samuel L. Jackson, with additional dialogue provided by John Eric Bentley.
- Nick Fury appears in Crimson Viper's ending for Marvel vs. Capcom 3: Fate of Two Worlds.
- Two versions of Nick Fury appear as playable characters in Marvel Super Hero Squad Online: one based on his appearance in The Super Hero Squad Show animated series, and one based on Samuel L. Jackson's portrayal in the 2012 film The Avengers.
- Nick Fury appears as a non-playable character in Marvel Avengers Alliance.
- Nick Fury appears in the Lego Marvel series:
  - Nick Fury appears in Lego Marvel Super Heroes, voiced by John Eric Bentley. The DS version features the original version as "Nick Fury Sr.".
  - Nick Fury appears in Lego Marvel's Avengers, voiced by Samuel L. Jackson.
  - Nick Fury appears in Lego Marvel Super Heroes 2, voiced by Chris Jarman.
- Nick Fury appears as a playable character in Marvel Heroes, voiced by Keith David.
- Nick Fury appears as a non-playable character in Marvel Avengers Alliance Tactics.
- Nick Fury appears as a playable character in Disney Infinity 2.0 and Disney Infinity 3.0, voiced by Samuel L. Jackson.
- Nick Fury appears as a playable character in Marvel Puzzle Quest.
- Nick Fury appears as a playable character in Marvel: Future Fight.
- Nick Fury appears as a playable character in Marvel Mighty Heroes.
- Nick Fury appears as an unlockable playable character in Marvel Strike Force.
- Nick Fury appears as a playable character in Marvel Contest of Champions.
- Nick Fury appears in Iron Man VR, voiced by Ike Amadi.
- Nick Fury appears in Marvel's Avengers, voiced by Charles Parnell. Once an ally of the Avengers and the director of S.H.I.E.L.D., he disappeared after the agency was forced to go underground following "A-Day". Before his disappearance, Fury hid copies of resources and protocols to enable S.H.I.E.L.D. to rebuild itself.
- Nick Fury appears in Marvel Future Revolution, with John Bentley reprising his role from various Marvel media.

== Live performance ==
Nick Fury appears in the Marvel Universe: LIVE! arena show.

== Novels ==
- Nick Fury is the main character in the novel Nick Fury, Agent of S.H.I.E.L.D.: Empyre.
- Nick Fury appears in the prose novel adaptation of the event comic The Death of Captain America.

== Web series ==
Nick Fury appears in several episodes of the stop-motion animated web series Marvel Superheroes: What the--?!.
