= Death Masks =

2003 urban fantasy novel by Jim Butcher

- Author: Jim Butcher
- Cover artist: Lee MacLeod
- Language: English
- Series: The Dresden Files
- Genre: Detective, Contemporary fantasy, Urban fantasy
- Publisher: New American Library
- Publication date: August 5, 2003
- Publication place: United States
- Media type: Print (paperback) (future hardcover)
- Pages: 374 pp (first edition, paperback)
- ISBN: 0-451-45940-7 (first edition, paperback) (future hardcover 0-451-46294-7)
- OCLC: 52730816
- LC Class: CPB Box no. 2127 vol. 3
- Preceded by: Summer Knight
- Followed by: Blood Rites

Death Masks is a 2003 novel by science fiction and fantasy author Jim Butcher. It is the fifth novel in The Dresden Files, his first published series that follows the character of Harry Dresden, professional wizard.

This book is published by New American Library with the ISBN 0-451-45940-7.

== Plot summary ==
Harry shares a TV panel with a Vatican priest, Father Vincent, and São Paulo University Professor Don Paolo Ortega, a disguised Red Court Vampire noble. Father Vincent hires Dresden to recover the stolen Shroud of Turin while Ortega challenges Harry to a duel to end the war between the White Council and the Red Court. After the show concludes, Dresden is attacked by the Denarian Ursiel, a fallen angel attached to a mortal host. Michael Carpenter and two other Knights of the Cross, Shiro and Sanya, rescue him and ask him to drop the Shroud investigation, but Dresden refuses.

Dresden tracks the Shroud to a boat, but is captured by the thieves. Deirdre, another Denarian, attacks the boat and kills one of the thieves. Dresden fools her into taking a decoy safe rather than the Shroud itself. The surviving thief, Anna Valmont, flees with the Shroud. Dresden's onetime lover, Susan Rodriguez, escorts him to a high society art sales charity event run by Johnny Marcone, where the Shroud will likely be sold. The sale is interrupted by the Denarians, who seize the Shroud and kidnap Dresden.

Nicodemus, leader of the Denarians, pressures Harry to join with the Denarian Lasciel or die. Dresden refuses. Shiro arrives and trades himself for Dresden. Dresden is almost re-captured, but Susan, enhanced in battle by her semi-vampire status, helps him escape. She reveals that she is working with The Fellowship of St. Giles, an organization of half-turned humans resisting the vampire Courts. Harry deduces that Father Vincent is a Denarian imposter, and the real priest is the murder victim he is investigating for Murphy. With the Knights, he captures the imposter and forces him to reveal that Nicodemus plans to use the Shroud to create a deadly plague curse at O'Hare Airport, an international travel hub.

Dresden fights his duel with Ortega at Wrigley Field, overseen by The Archive (a little girl containing the sum of humanity's written knowledge) and her bodyguard Kincaid. Ortega, facing defeat, draws a forbidden weapon. He is shot by Martin, one of Susan's associates. Red Court vampires surge onto the field, covering Ortega's escape. Dresden races to the airport with the Knights. They find Shiro severely tortured and near death. Shiro entrusts his sacred sword Fidelacchius to Dresden and reveals that Nicodemus is now going to St. Louis by train to spread the plague curse. He then dies. Dresden enlists the aid of Marcone and catches up to the St. Louis train. Dresden, Marcone, and the Knights battle the Denarians to retrieve the Shroud. They recover the Shroud and stop the plague, but Nicodemus escapes and Marcone appropriates the shroud.

While Dresden recuperates in Michael's home, he receives a letter from Shiro, who reveals he is dying of cancer and intended to sacrifice himself. Dresden's White Council mentor, Ebenezar McCoy, wipes out Ortega's Latin American compound by crashing a satellite into it. Dresden trails Marcone to a secluded, rural hospital and discovers that Marcone is using the Shroud in an attempt to heal the comatose Amanda Beckitt. Dresden tells Marcone he can have three days to see if the Shroud will heal her, then return it to the Church. Marcone agrees. Nicodemus attempts to suborn Michael's youngest son into the Denarian order, but Dresden thwarts him, but not without pain and cost.

== Introduced characters ==
- Dr. Waldo Butters: night shift coroner (medical examiner) at the Cook County morgue (Forensic Institute). He tips off Dresden and Murphy when he gets odd causes of death or the corpses of paranormal creatures. In later books he provides off-the-books medical aid, when going to a hospital could be dangerous or awkward.
- Shiro Yoshimo: a Knight of the Cross, who bears the sword Fidelacchius; he is killed by Nicodemus. He had become a baptist due to a misunderstanding at an Elvis Presley concert.
- Sanya: a Knight of the Cross, who bears the sword Esperacchius. A Russian, a former Denarian, and an agnostic even though the Archangel Michael gave him his sword.
- Molly Carpenter: Michael and Charity's daughter and eldest child.
- The Archive: a young girl who has had the sum of all human knowledge passed down to her along the maternal line. Dresden nicknamed her "Ivy", because she has no given name.
- Jared Kincaid: the Archive's bodyguard and driver.
- The Denarians: the 30 fallen angels who reside in Judas Iscariot's 30 denarii of silver.
- Nicodemus: possessed by the demon Anduriel, and leader of the Denarians.
- The Fellowship of St. Giles: named for the patron saint of lepers and similar Outcasts, it is made up of people who are half-human and more specifically those who have been infected by Red Court vampires, but have yet to drink the lifeblood of another human to complete their transformation.
- Lasciel: a Denarian, the Temptress.
- Anna Valmont: member of the "Churchmice", a group of professional thieves who specialize in robbing churches and other sacred sites.

== Reception ==
Victoria Strauss, in a review on SFSite.com, wrote that "Death Masks is Butcher's most assured book yet, a smooth melding of inventive storylines, dark supernatural themes, edge-of-your-seat adventure, strong characterizations, and irreverent humor".

The novel was also reviewed by Booklist, which wrote that "Butcher maintains a breakneck pace in Harry's exciting fifth adventure. This imaginative series continues to surprise and delight with its inventiveness and sympathetic hero".
