= Nick Fury, Agent of S.H.I.E.L.D.: Empyre =

Book by Will Murray

- Cover art by Joe Jusko
- Author: Will Murray
- Illustrator: Jim Steranko
- Language: English
- Series: Nick Fury, Agent of Shield
- Subject: Nick Fury
- Genre: Spy fiction
- Published: 2000
- Publisher: Berkley Books; Marvel Comics
- Publication place: United States
- Media type: Hardcover and paperback
- Pages: 48
- ISBN: 978-0425168165

Nick Fury, Agent of S.H.I.E.L.D.: Empyre is a novel written by Will Murray and published by Berkley Books and Marvel Comics in 2000. It is the first appearance of the character of Nick Fury in novel form. It features illustrations by longtime Nick Fury artist Jim Steranko. The plot revived the concept of S.H.I.E.L.D.'s psychic sensory division from the old Stan Lee and Jack Kirby comics.

== Background ==
Murray is a longstanding author within the pulp genre and had written over 40 novels in the Destroyer series and many Doc Savage novels before taking on the assignment. The book was part of a line of Marvel novels in 2000 published by Berkley Books.

== Plot ==
Nick Fury, Dum Dum Dugan and S.H.I.E.L.D. agent Starla Spacek of the new Special Powers Division investigate a global threat as a series of planes mysteriously crash, culminating in the disappearance of an Empyre Airlines jumbo jet. Suspicion initially points to the involvement of terrorists in the Neo-Nazi organization HYDRA, but Fury soon learns that the true villain is the insane leader of the nation Quorak - who wants nothing less than world destruction.

== Sequel ==
A sequel novel pairing up Nick Fury and Wolverine was planned but never came to fruition.

== Reception ==
The reviewer of NickFuryAgentofShield.com described the book as a solid but ultimately unspectacular affair.

== See also ==
- 2000 in literature
- 2000 in comics
- Spider-Man: Down These Mean Streets, another novel based on a Marvel comics character
- Spider-Man: The Darkest Hours, another novel based on a Marvel comics character
