= Jim Butcher =

American fantasy author (born 1971)

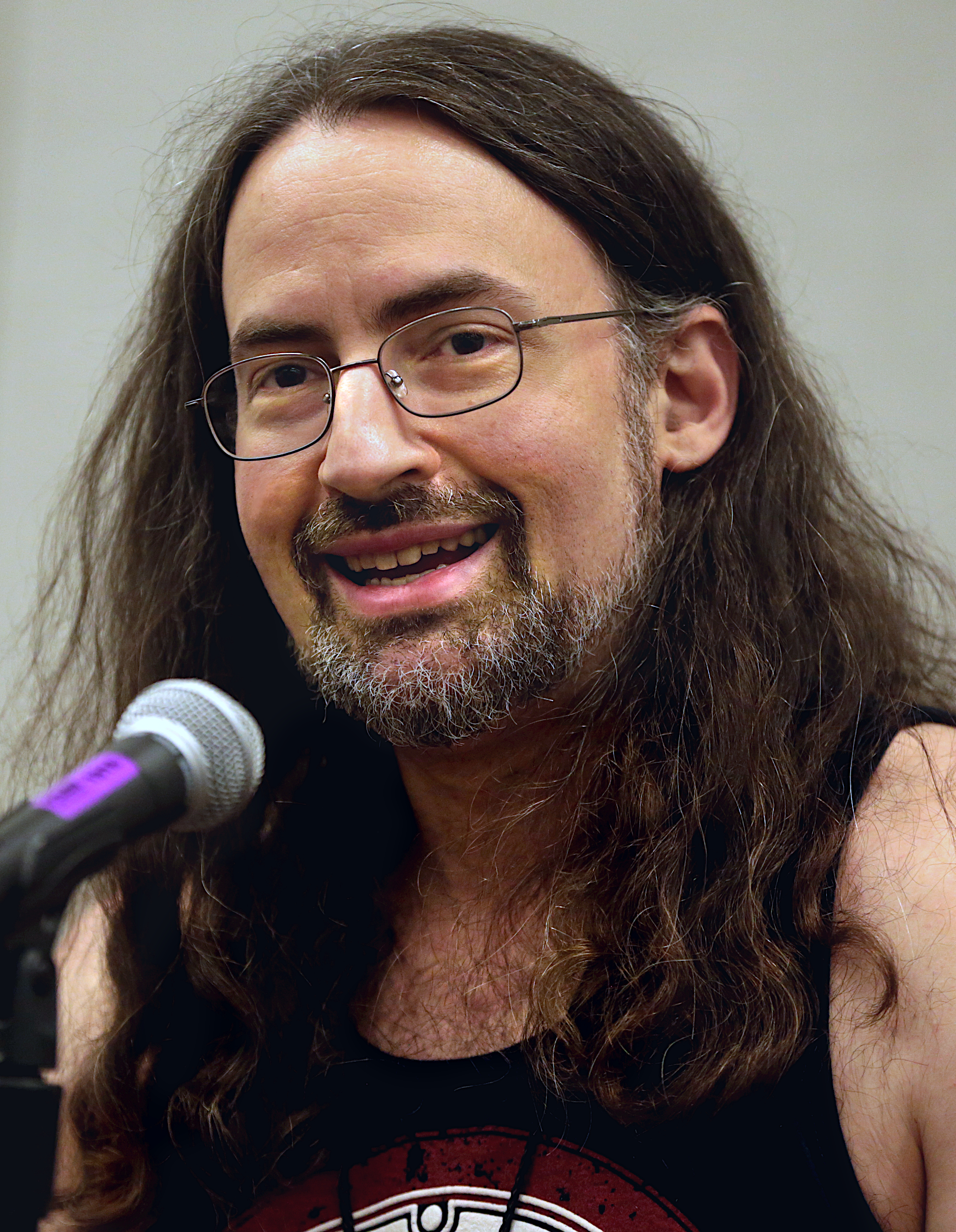
- Butcher at Phoenix Comicon 2017
- Born: October 26, 1971 (age 54); Independence, Missouri, U.S.
- Occupation: Novelist
- Writing career
- Period: April 2000 – present
- Genres: Fantasy, Speculative fiction, Science fiction
- Notable works: The Dresden Files, Codex Alera
- Website: www.jim-butcher.com

Jim Butcher (born October 26, 1971) is an American author. He has written the contemporary fantasy The Dresden Files, Codex Alera, and Cinder Spires book series.

== Personal life ==
Butcher was born in Independence, Missouri, in 1971. He is the youngest of three children, having two older sisters. He has one son, James J. Butcher, who is also a fantasy writer.

== Career ==
While he was sick with strep throat as a child, Butcher's sisters introduced him to The Lord of the Rings and The Han Solo Adventures novels to pass the time, beginning his fascination with fantasy and science fiction. As a teenager, he completed his first novel and set out to become a writer. After many unsuccessful attempts to enter the traditional fantasy genre (he cites J. R. R. Tolkien, Lloyd Alexander, and C. S. Lewis, among others, as major influences), he wrote the first book in The Dresden Files—about a professional wizard, named Harry Dresden, in modern-day Chicago—as an exercise for a writing course in 1996 at the age of 25.

For two years, Butcher floated his manuscript among various publishers before hitting the convention circuit to make contacts in the industry. After meeting Butcher in person, Ricia Mainhardt, the agent who discovered Laurell K. Hamilton, agreed to represent him, which kick-started his writing career. However, Butcher and Mainhardt have since parted ways; Jennifer Jackson is his current agent. Butcher has written two series: The Dresden Files and Codex Alera. Codex Alera has ended after six novels and The Dresden Files are still ongoing; he has also written a Spider-Man novel, entitled The Darkest Hours, released on June 27, 2006. In addition, he contributed a short story for publication in My Big Fat Supernatural Wedding with Charlaine Harris and Sherrilyn Kenyon, among others, released in October 2006. He has since contributed to the anthologies Many Bloody Returns in September 2007 and My Big Fat Supernatural Honeymoon in December 2007. In October 2008, he released another short story in Blood Lite and a novelette, "Backup", illustrated by Mike Mignola.

=== Dresden Files series ===
Six months after Butcher was signed by Mainhardt, Storm Front, the first novel in The Dresden Files, was picked up by Roc/Penguin Books for publishing. It was released as a paperback in April 2000. Fool Moon followed nine months later on January 1, 2001, and the third book, Grave Peril, was published in September 2001. Thereafter, the release schedule slowed, with Summer Knight appearing on September 3, 2002. The fifth and sixth books, Death Masks and Blood Rites, appeared in August 2003 and 2004, respectively. Coinciding with the release of Blood Rites, Butcher published a Harry Dresden short story, entitled Restoration of Faith, on his website, chronicling Harry's life before The Dresden Files as a private eye for Ragged Angel Investigations. In December 2004, the Science Fiction Book Club picked up the first three novels in the series for release in a hardcover omnibus edition titled Wizard for Hire for a March–April 2005 rush release in order to arrive on store shelves before the seventh novel in May.

Dead Beat, released on May 3, 2005, was the first hardback release in the series by Roc. The first printing of 15,000 copies sold out in three days, and the book was immediately reprinted. A second omnibus edition, titled Wizard by Trade and containing Summer Knight and Death Masks, appeared in early 2006, followed by Proven Guilty on May 2, 2006, the same day as the paperback edition of Dead Beat. Proven Guilty quickly climbed to #21 on the New York Times Best Seller list and #91 on the USA Today list. A third omnibus release from the Science Fiction Book Club entitled Wizard at Large and containing Blood Rites and Dead Beat was released in November 2006.

A ninth book from Roc, White Night, was released on April 3, 2007, shortly after the paperback edition for Proven Guilty in February. White Night reached the top five of the New York Times Best Seller list on an initial printing of 100,000 copies. Small Favor, the tenth book in the series, was released April 1, 2008. It debuted at number two on the New York Times Best Seller list, Butcher's highest debut ever, and number three on the USA Today best seller list. The eleventh book in the series, Turn Coat, was released April 7, 2009. The 12th book in the series, Changes, was released April 6, 2010. The 13th book, Ghost Story, was released July 26, 2011. The 14th book, Cold Days was released in hardback in November 2012. The 15th book, Skin Game, was released on May 27, 2014. The series garners a strong following and is now available in several languages, including Spanish, Dutch, French, Czech, Polish, German and Mandarin Chinese.

=== Codex Alera series ===
After the success of the beginning of The Dresden Files, Butcher returned to the traditional fantasy genre with his second series, Codex Alera. The series chronicles the life of a young man named Tavi from the Calderon Valley of Alera on the world of Carna. The people of Alera have grown complacent with the trappings of empire (the story is based loosely on the late Roman Empire) and their control of powerful elemental forces known as furies. The inspiration for the series came from a bet Butcher was challenged to by a member of the Del Rey Online Writer's Workshop. The challenger bet that Butcher could not write a good story based on a lame idea, and he countered that he could do it using two lame ideas of the challenger's choosing. The "lame" ideas given were "Lost Roman Legion", and "Pokémon". On March 3, 2003, Jim Butcher announced that Ace had won a bidding war against rival publisher Del Rey Books for the rights to the series.

The first novel in the series, Furies of Calderon, was published in hardcover by Ace, and in August 2004, major booksellers began taking pre-orders for an October 5, 2004 release. Furies of Calderon was the first hardcover release for Butcher, and was a significant step forward in making the transition from a part-time to a full-time writer. A paperback version followed in June 2005, just a month before the release of the second book, Academ's Fury. It was released in paperback on November 28, 2006, with the third novel, Cursor's Fury, following on December 5.

While originally intended to be a six-book series, Codex Alera was initially signed as a trilogy. After the series showed success, Roc agreed to publish three more novels in the Codex Alera series. The fourth novel, Captain's Fury, released December 4, 2007 and peaked at #17 on The New York Times Best Seller list. The fifth novel, Princeps' Fury, was released November 25, 2008 and peaked at #13 on The New York Times Best Seller list. The sixth and final novel, First Lord's Fury, was released on November 24, 2009, and has reached #7 on The New York Times Best Seller list.

Audio rights to the Codex Alera belong to Penguin Audio. Captain's Fury was released in audio format March 27, 2008, read by Kate Reading. Audio versions of the first three books were released in November 2008. The audio book of First Lord's Fury was released simultaneously with the hardcover.

=== Cinder Spires series ===
On March 4, 2013, Publishers Weekly revealed that Butcher had closed a deal with the Penguin Group for the first three books of a steampunk-inspired series called The Cinder Spires. Publishers Weekly quotes Butcher's agent Jennifer Jackson as saying the series "is set in a world 'of black spires that tower for miles over a mist-shrouded surface' and follows a war between two of the Spires: Spire Albion and Spire Aurora". At a Reddit AMA on November 12, 2012, Butcher said "It's kinda League of Extraordinary Gentlemen meets Sherlock meets Hornblower. There are goggles and airships and steam power and bizarre crystal technology and talking cats, who are horrid little bullies." The Aeronaut's Windlass, the first book in the projected nine-book series, was published in September 2015.

== Audiobooks and games ==
Storm Front was released in July 2002 as an unabridged eight-CD set, with an unabridged nine-CD set of Fool Moon following in August 2003. The Grave Peril audiobook shipped as an unabridged 10-CD set on October 28, 2004, with a free T-shirt bundled with all purchases before December 26, 2004. Summer Knight was released March 31, 2007.

Butcher was friends with some of the founders of Evil Hat Productions since before they began designing games, and his agent Jennifer Jackson suggested that they might be able to design a role-playing game based on his Dresden Files novels; Butcher contacted Evil Hat who agreed to develop and publish The Dresden Files Roleplaying Game. On December 16, 2004, Butcher also signed a deal with Evil Hat Productions to release the game. The game uses a modified ruleset from Evil Hat's acclaimed Fate RPG.

== Television series ==
Television writer and producer Morgan Gendel optioned The Dresden Files in June 2003, paving the way for a film or television release of the series. On April 5, 2004, Sci Fi announced production of a two-hour backdoor pilot film of The Dresden Files based on the events of Storm Front in conjunction with Lions Gate Television and Saturn Films, with Nicolas Cage and Norm Golightly set to executive produce. Gendel was listed to write and executive produce the television series, along with Anthony Peckham. Initially, Harry Dresden was listed as "Erik" Dresden, but by the end of 2004 the name had been canned in early drafts of the pilot in favor of Harry.

On October 5, 2005, Variety reported that the television project had been officially greenlit by Sci Fi, with Hans Beimler and Robert Wolfe coming on board as executive producers with Cage, Golightly, and Gendel. Production of the pilot took place in Toronto, and the original intent was to air the pilot movie in the summer of 2006. In November, the Sci Fi Wire released casting details for the series, with Paul Blackthorne cast as Harry Dresden over James Marsters, who turned down the opportunity to audition because he was unwilling to relocate from Los Angeles. In May 2006, Sci Fi announced an initial purchase of eleven episodes of The Dresden Files and a January 2007 premiere of the two-hour pilot movie. The show garnered mixed reviews.

After the season one finale aired on April 15, 2007, fans began a letter campaign in an attempt to have the show renewed. Sci Fi decided not to continue production on The Dresden Files the following August.

== Awards ==
Butcher has received nominations for the Hugo Award for Best Novel for Skin Game in 2015 and The Aeronaut's Windlass in 2016, and a nomination for the Hugo Award for Best Graphic Story for Welcome to the Jungle in 2009. In 2019 he was also nominated for the Locus Award for Best Collection for Brief Cases.

Twelve Months won the 2026 Dragon Award for Best Fantasy Novel.

== Published works ==
=== Dresden Files series ===
Dresden Files bibliography
| No. | Title | Paperback release date | Paperback ISBN | Hardcover release date | Hardcover ISBN | Audio release date | Audio CD ISBN | MP3 CD ISBN | Audio length |
|---|---|---|---|---|---|---|---|---|---|
| 1 | Storm Front | April 1, 2000 | 0-4514-5781-1 | November 6, 2007 | 0-4514-6197-5 | July 2002 | 0-9657-2550-2 | 978-1-4805-8050-3 | 8h 1m |
| 2 | Fool Moon | January 1, 2001 | 0-4514-5812-5 | July 1, 2008 | 0-4514-6202-5 | April 30, 2003 | 0-9657-2552-9 | 978-1-4805-9690-0 | 10h 6m |
| 3 | Grave Peril | September 1, 2001 | 0-4514-5844-3 | November 4, 2008 | 0-4514-6234-3 | July 30, 2005 | 0-9657-2555-3 | 978-1-4805-8133-3 | 11h 59m |
| 4 | Summer Knight | September 3, 2002 | 0-4514-5892-3 | July 7, 2009 | 0-4514-6275-0 | March 31, 2007 | 0-9790-7492-4 | 978-1-4805-9692-4 | 11h 12m |
| 5 | Death Masks | August 5, 2003 | 0-4514-5940-7 | November 3, 2009 | 0-4514-6294-7 | October 29, 2009 | 0-1431-4519-3 | 978-1-4498-2379-5 | 11h 21m |
| 6 | Blood Rites | August 2, 2004 | 0-4514-5987-3 | July 5, 2010 | 0-4514-6335-8 | April 15, 2010 | 0-1424-2806-X | 978-1-4498-2421-1 | 13h 11m |
| 7 | Dead Beat | May 2, 2006 | 0-4514-6091-X | May 3, 2005 | 0-4514-6027-8 | April 15, 2010 | 0-1424-2807-8 | 978-1-4498-2418-1 | 15h 14m |
| 8 | Proven Guilty | February 6, 2007 | 0-4514-6103-7 | May 2, 2006 | 0-4514-6085-5 | April 30, 2009 | 0-1431-4473-1 | 978-1-4498-2415-0 | 16h 16m |
| 9 | White Night | February 5, 2008 | 0-4514-6155-X | April 3, 2007 | 0-4514-614-01 | April 30, 2009 | 0-1431-4474-X | 978-1-4906-4494-3 | 14h 13m |
| 10 | Small Favor | May 3, 2009 | 0-4514-6200-9 | April 1, 2008 | 0-4514-6189-4 | April 1, 2008 | 1-4362-1140-9 | 978-0-1431-4339-0 | 13h 50m |
| 11 | Turn Coat | March 3, 2010 | 0-4514-6281-5 | April 7, 2009 | 0-4514-6256-4 | April 30, 2009 | 0-1431-4472-3 | 978-1-4498-2409-9 | 14h 40m |
| 12 | Changes | March 11, 2011 | 0-4514-6347-1 | April 6, 2010 | 0-4514-6317-X | April 15, 2010 | 0-1431-4534-7 | 978-1-1011-5486-1 | 15h 28m |
| 13 | Ghost Story | August 7, 2012 | 0-4514-6407-9 | July 26, 2011 | 0-4514-6379-X | August 4, 2011 | 1-6646-3559-9 | 978-1-4618-0562-5 | 17h 52m |
| 14 | Cold Days | September 3, 2013 | 0-4514-1912-X | November 27, 2012 | 0-4514-6440-0 | December 27, 2012 | 1-6646-2088-5 | 978-1-1016-1703-8 | 18h 50m |
| 15 | Skin Game | March 5, 2015 | 0-3565-0096-9 | May 27, 2014 | 0-4514-6439-7 | May 29, 2014 | 1-4906-3041-4 | 978-1-4906-3041-0 | 15h 49m |
| 16 | Peace Talks | July 14, 2020 | 0-3565-1529-X | July 14, 2020 | 0-4514-6441-9 | July 14, 2020 | 1-6117-6294-4 | 978-0-5932-9071-2 | 12h 52m |
| 17 | Battle Ground | September 29, 2020 | 0-3565-1570-2 | September 29, 2020 | 0-5931-9930-8 | September 29, 2020 | | | 15h 43m |
| 18 | Twelve Months | | | January 20, 2026 | 0-5931-9933-2 | January 20, 2026 | | | 16h 59m |
| 19 | Mirror Mirror | | | TBD | | | | | |

Dresden Files omnibus bibliography
| No. | Title | Release Date | Book ISBN | Audio CD ISBN | Contents |
|---|---|---|---|---|---|
| 1–3 | Wizard for Hire | March 2005 | 0-7394-5193-6 | — | Storm Front, Fool Moon & Grave Peril |
| 4 & 5 | Wizard by Trade | March 2006 | 0-7394-6581-3 | — | Summer Knight & Death Masks |
| 6 & 7 | Wizard at Large | October 2006 | 0-7394-7658-0 | — | Blood Rites & Dead Beat |
| 8 & 9 | Wizard Under Fire | May 2007 | 0-7394-8344-7 | — | Proven Guilty & White Night |
| — | Side Jobs | October 26, 2010 | 0-4514-6365-X | 0-1424-2826-4 | Eleven short stories |
| — | Brief Cases | June 5, 2018 | 0-4514-9210-2 | 978-1-4362-1140-6 | Twelve short stories |

=== Codex Alera series ===
| No. | Title | Release date | Hardcover ISBN | Paperback ISBN | Audiobook ISBN | Audio Release |
|---|---|---|---|---|---|---|
| 1 | Furies of Calderon | October 5, 2004 | 0-4410-1199-3 | 0-4410-1268-X | 0-14314376-X | November 20, 2008 |
| 2 | Academ's Fury | July 5, 2005 | 0-4410-1283-3 | 0-4410-1340-6 | 0-14314377-8 | November 20, 2008 |
| 3 | Cursor's Fury | December 5, 2006 | 0-4410-1434-8 | 0-4410-1547-6 | 0-14314378-6 | November 20, 2008 |
| 4 | Captain's Fury | December 4, 2007 | 0-4410-1527-1 | 0-4410-1655-3 | 0-14314338-7 | March 27, 2008 |
| 5 | Princeps' Fury | December 2, 2008 | 0-4410-1638-3 | 0-4410-1796-7 | 0-14314375-1 | November 25, 2008 |
| 6 | First Lord's Fury | November 24, 2009 | 0-4410-1769-X | 0-4410-1962-5 | 0-14314520-7 | November 24, 2009 |

=== Cinder Spires series ===
| No. | Title | Release date | Hardcover ISBN | Paperback ISBN | Audiobook ISBN | Audio release date |
|---|---|---|---|---|---|---|
| 1 | The Aeronaut's Windlass | September 29, 2015 | 978-0-451-46680-8 | 978-0-451-46681-5 | 978-1-611-76229-7 (CD) | September 29, 2015 |
| 2 | The Olympian Affair | November 7, 2023 | 978-0-451-46682-2 | -- | 978-0-698-13807-0 (download) | November 7, 2023 |

=== Other ===
- Spider-Man: The Darkest Hours (June 27, 2006, ISBN 1-4165-1068-0)
