= Aliette de Bodard bibliography =

This is a list of the published works of Aliette de Bodard.

== Novels ==
=== Obsidian and Blood series ===
- — (7 Jan 2010). Servant of the Underworld. Angry Robot Books. ISBN 9780007346547.
- — (6 Jan 2011). Harbinger of the Storm. Angry Robot Books. ISBN 978-0857660763.
- — (25 Oct 2011). Master of the House of Darts. Angry Robot Books. ISBN 9780857661609.

=== Dominion of the Fallen series ===
- — (18 Aug 2015). The House of Shattered Wings. Gollancz / Ace. ISBN 9780451477385.
- — (4 Apr 2017). The House of Binding Thorns. Gollancz / Ace. ISBN 9780451477392.
- — (25 Jul 2019). The House of Sundering Flames. Gollancz / Ace. ISBN 9781473223400.

=== Xuya universe ===
- — (24 Nov 2022). The Red Scholar's Wake. Gollancz. ISBN 9781399601368.
- — (12 Oct 2023). A Fire Born of Exile. Gollancz. ISBN 9781625676535.

=== Standalone ===
- — (8 Oct 2018). In the Vanishers' Palace. JABberwocky Literary Agency. ISBN 9781625673985.

== Novellas ==
=== Xuya universe ===
- — (24 Dec 2012). On a Red Station, Drifting. Immersion Press. ISBN 9780956392459.
- — (Oct–Nov 2015). The Citadel of Weeping Pearls. Asimov's Science Fiction. ISBN 9781625672551.
- — (31 Mar 2018). The Tea Master and the Detective. Subterranean Press. ISBN 9781596068643.
- — (31 Oct 2020). Seven of Infinities. Subterranean Press. ISBN 9781625675330.
- — (1 Nov 2024). In the Shadow of the Ship. Subterranean Press. ISBN 9781645241478.

=== Dragons and Blades ===
Dragons and Blades is a spinoff series from de Bodard's Dominion of the Fallen universe.

- — (6 Jan 2020). Of Dragons, Feasts and Murders. JABberwocky Literary Agency. ISBN 9781625675835.
- — (28 Jun 2022). Of Charms, Ghosts and Grievances. JABberwocky Literary Agency. ISBN 9781625675941.

=== Standalone ===
- — (9 Feb 2021). Fireheart Tiger. Tordotcom. ISBN 9781250793263.
- — (30 Jul 2024). Navigational Entanglements. Tordotcom. ISBN 9781250324887.

== Collections ==
- — (17 Jul 2012). Scattered Among Strange Worlds. Nine Dragons River. ASIN B008MO6WA8.

== Short stories ==
=== Xuya Universe ===
- — (Nov 2007). "The Lost Xuyan Bride". Interzone. No. 213.
- — (Nov 2008). "Butterfly, Falling at Dawn". Interzone. No. 219.
  - Reprinted: — (23 Jun 2009). "Butterfly, Falling at Dawn". In Dozois, Gardner (ed.). The Year's Best Science Fiction: Twenty-Sixth Annual Collection. St. Martin's Press. ISBN 9780312551049.
  - Reprinted: — (14 May 2012). "Butterfly, Falling at Dawn" (PDF). International Speculative Fiction.
  - Reprinted: — (9 Apr 2013). "Butterfly, Falling at Dawn". In Mendes, Roberto; Loureiro (eds.). International Speculative Fiction 2012 Annual Anthology. Hipper Tiger Books. ISBN 9781927624029.
- — (Spring 2010). "Fleeing Tezcatlipoca". Space and Time. No. 111.
- — (Jul 2010). "The Jaguar House, in Shadow". Asimov's Science Fiction.
- — (Nov–Dec 2010). "The Shipmaker". Interzone. No. 231.
  - Reprinted: — (Jan 2017). "The Shipmaker". Clarkesworld Magazine. No. 124.
- — (Feb 2011). "Shipbirth". Asimov's Science Fiction.
- — (Jan 2012). "Scattered Along the River of Heaven". Clarkesworld Magazine. No. 64.
  - Reprinted: — (2 Jul 2013). "Scattered Along the River of Heaven". In Horton, Rich (ed.). The Year's Best Science Fiction and Fantasy 2013. Prime Books. ISBN 9781607013921.
- — (Jun 2012). "Immersion". Clarkesworld Magazine. No. 69.
- — (17 Jul 2012). "Two Sisters in Exile". In Whates, Ian (ed.). Solaris Rising 1.5: An Exclusive ebook of New Science Fiction. Solaris Books. ISBN 9781849974424.
  - Reprinted: — (10 Dec 2013). "Two Sisters in Exile". In Hartwell, David G. (ed.). The Year's Best SF 18. Tordotcom. ISBN 9781466838185.
- — (Jul–Aug 2012). "Ship's Brother". Interzone. No. 241.
  - Reprinted: — (23 Jul 2013). "Ship's Brother". In Dozois, Gardner (ed.). The Year's Best Science Fiction: Thirtieth Annual Collection. St. Martin's Press. ISBN 9781250028051.
  - Reprinted: — (Jan 2014). "Ship's Brother". Clarkesworld Magazine. No. 88.
- — (Aug 2012). "Starsong". Asimov's Science Fiction. Dell Magazines.
- — (Mar 2013). "The Weight of a Blessing". Clarkesworld Magazine. No. 78.
- — (23 Apr 2013). "The Waiting Stars". In Andreadis, Athena (ed.). The Other Half of the Sky. Candlemark & Gleam. ISBN 9781936460441.
  - Reprinted: — (15 Jul 2014). "The Waiting Stars". In Dozois, Gardner (ed.). The Year's Best Science Fiction: Thirty-First Annual Collection. St. Martin's Press. ISBN 9781250046208.
- — (Jan 2014). "Memorials". Asimov's Science Fiction. Dell Magazines. (Note: Companion piece for "The Weight of a Blessing")
  - Reprinted: — (Jun 2016). "Memorials". Apex Magazine. No. 85.
- — (6 Mar 2014). "The Breath of War". Beneath Ceaseless Skies. No. 142.
- — (Spring 2014). "The Days of War, as Red as Blood, as Dark as Bile". Subterranean Magazine.
- — (26 Aug 2014). "The Frost on Jade Buds". In Whates, Ian (ed.). Solaris Rising 3. Solaris Books. ISBN 9781781082096.
- — (2 Dec 2014). "A Slow Unfurling of Truth". In Bova, Ben; Choi, Eric (eds.). Carbide Tipped Pens: Seventeen Tales of Hard Science Fiction. Tor Books. ISBN 9780765334305.
- — (Jan 2015). "Three Cups of Grief, by Starlight". Clarkesworld Magazine. No. 100.
- — (1 Dec 2015). "In Blue Lily's Wake". In Strahan, Jonathan (ed.). Meeting Infinity. Solaris Books. ISBN 9781781083802.
- — (17 Mar 2016). "A Salvaging of Ghosts". Beneath Ceaseless Skies. No. 195.
- — (1 May 2016). "Crossing the Midday Gate". In Andreadis, Athena (ed.). To Shape the Dark. Candlemark & Gleam. ISBN 9781936460670.
- — (5 Jul 2016). "A Hundred and Seventy Storms". Uncanny Magazine. No. 11.
- — (18 Oct 2016). "Pearl". In Wolfe, Navah; Parisien, Dominik (eds.). The Starlit Wood: New Fairy Tales. Saga Press. ISBN 9781481456128.
- — (10 Jan 2017). "First Presentation". In Brin, David; Potts, Stephen W. (eds.). Chasing Shadows: Visions of Our Coming Transparent World. Tor Books. ISBN 9780765382580.
- — (18 Apr 2017). "The Dragon That Flew Out of the Sun". In Adams, John Joseph (ed.). Cosmic Powers: The Saga Anthology of Far-Away Galaxies. Saga Press. ISBN 9781481435024.
  - Reprinted: — (5 Mar 2019). "The Dragon That Flew Out of the Sun". Uncanny Magazine. No. 27.
- — (1 Aug 2017). "A Game of Three Generals". In Gevers, Nick (ed.). Extrasolar: Tales of Super-Earths and Hot Jupiters. PS Publishing. ISBN 978-1786361714.
- — (9 Jul 2019). "Rescue Party". In Strahan, Jonathan (ed.). Mission Critical. Solaris Books. ISBN 9781786181947.
- — (7 Sep 2021). "Mulberry and Owl". Uncanny Magazine. No. 42.

=== Obsidian and Blood series ===
- — (15 Sep 2007). "Obsidian Shards". L. Ron Hubbard Presents Writers of the Future Volume XXIII. Galaxy Press. ISBN 9781592123988.
- — (15 Jan 2009). "Beneath the Mask". Beneath Ceaseless Skies. No. 8.
- — (Winter 2009). "Safe, Child, Safe". Talebones. No. 39.

=== Dominion of the Fallen series ===
This section is arranged in the order the author suggests you read the stories:

- — (9 Sep 2015). Of Books, and Earth, and Courtship. Nine Dragon Rivers. ASIN B01563OG7I.
- — (16 Sep 2015). In Morningstar's Shadow. Nine Dragon Rivers. ASIN B015HR1LGM.
- — (27 Sep 2015). "Against the Encroaching Darkness". Grimdark Magazine. No. 5.
- — (31 Dec 2015). "The Death of Aiguillon". In Kuznia, Yanni (ed.). A Fantasy Medley 3. Subterranean Press. ISBN 9781596067677.
- — (27 Sep 2018). "Court of Birth, Court of Strength". Beneath Ceaseless Skies. No. 261.
- — (18 Aug 2015). "The House, in Winter". The House of Shattered Wings. Gollancz / Ace. ISBN 9780451477385. (Note: Included only in the UK mass market paperback version)
- — (Jul–Aug 2017). "Children of Thorns, Children of Water". Uncanny Magazine. No. 17.

=== The Numbers Quartet ===
The Numbers Quartet is a series of twelve short stories. Each of the four authors contributed three short stories. In addition to de Bodard, the other authors are Nancy Fulda, Stephen Gaskell, and Benjamin Rosenbaum. Each story is based on a physical or mathematical constant, such as pi or the speed of light. They were all published in Daily Science Fiction between January and March 2012. The stories appeared in chronological sequence, with the oldest developed constant (pi) being the first in the series.

- — (1 Feb 2012). "Worlds like a Hundred Thousand Pearls". Daily Science Fiction. The Numbers Quartet #5.
- — (29 Feb 2012). "The Princess of the Perfume River". Daily Science Fiction. The Numbers Quartet #9.
- — (14 Mar 2012). "The Heartless Light of Stars". Daily Science Fiction. The Numbers Quartet #11.

All three stories were reprinted in the following anthology:

- — (1 Jan 2013). Barasso, Michele-Lee; Laden, Jonathan (eds.). Rocket Dragons Ignite: Daily Science Fiction Year Two. Daily Science Fiction. ISBN 9780984909315.

=== Other ===
- — (Feb 2006). "The Triad's Gift". Deep Magic. No. 45.
- — (Spring 2006). "A Warrior's Death". Shimmer Magazine. Vol. 1, no. 3.
- — (May 2006). "Citadel of Cobras". The Sword Review. No. 14.
- — (May 2006). "Kindred Spirits". Deep Magic. No. 48.
- — (May 2006). "For a Daughter". Haruah.
- — (Autumn 2006). "Through the Obsidian Gates". Shimmer Magazine. Vol. 2, no. 1.
- — (2007). "Calling the Unicorn". Andromeda Spaceways Inflight Magazine. No. 25.
- — (2007). "Weepers and Ragers". Abyss & Apex Magazine. No. 22, 2nd Quarter.
- — (May 2007). "The Naming at the Pool". Reflection's Edge.
- — (Jul–Aug 2007). "Deer Flight". Interzone. No. 211.
- — (August 2007). "Autumn's Country". Andromeda Spaceways Inflight Magazine. No. 30.
- — (Autumn 2007). "Sea Child". Coyote Wild Magazine.
- — (Nov 2007). "At the Gates of White Marble". Leading Edge. No. 54.
- — (Spring 2008). "The Dancer's Gift". Fictitious Force. No. 5.
- — (April 2008). "Horus Ascending". InterGalactic Medicine Show. No. 8.
- — (June 2008). "Dragon Feasts". Andromeda Spaceways Inflight Magazine. No. 35.
- — (Autumn 2008). "The Dragon's Tears". Electric Velocipede. No. 15/16.
- — (Winter 2008). "Within the City of the Swan". Shimmer Magazine. Vol. 2, no. 4.
- — (Feb–Mar 2009). "The Lonely Heart". Black Static. No. 9.
  - Reprinted: — (15 Jun 2010). "The Lonely Heart". In Ciriello, Dario (ed.). Eight Against Reality. Panverse Publishing. ISBN 9780692008850.
  - Reprinted: — (Jan 2015). "The Lonely Heart". Lightspeed. No. 56.
- — (Mar 2009). "City of the Gods". Alternative Coordinates. No. 1.
- — (2009). "Dancing for the Monsoon". Abyss & Apex Magazine. No. 30, 2nd quarter.
- — (Apr 2009). "Murder in Laochan". In Krasnostein, Alisa; Wessely, Tehani (eds.). New Ceres Nights. Twelfth Planet Press. ISBN 9780980484120.
- — (May 2009). "Memories of my Sister". Expanded Horizons. No. 7.
- — (May 2009). "Ys". Interzone. No. 222.
  - Reprinted: — (22 Aug 2012). "Ys". In Edwards, Jan; Barber, Jenny (eds.). The Alchemy Press Book of Ancient Wonders. Alchemy Press. ISBN 9780953226085.
- — (1 Jul 2009). "Healing Hands". In Horner, W. H. (ed.). Fantastical Visions IV. Illustrated by Stephanie Pui-Mun Law. Fantasist Enterprises. ISBN 9780971360877.
- — (30 Jul 2009). "Blighted Heart". Beneath Ceaseless Skies. No. 22.
- — (Aug 2009). "Golden Lilies". Fantasy Magazine. No. 29.
- — (Sep 2009). "On Horizon's Shores". InterGalactic Medicine Show. No. 14.
  - Reprinted: — (19 Dec 2013). "On Horizon's Shores". In Card, Orson Scott; Schubert, Edmund R. (eds.). InterGalactic Medicine Show: Big Book of SF Novelettes. Hatrack River. ASIN B00HI4BC5I.
- — (2 Nov 2009). "After the Fire". Apex Magazine.
- — (31 Dec 2009). "In the Age of Iron and Ashes". Beneath Ceaseless Skies. No. 33.
- — (3 Jan 2010). "By Bargain and by Blood". Hub Magazine. No. 108.
- — (26 Jan 2010). "Eye of the Destroyer". In Horner, W. H. (ed.). Blood & Devotion: Tales of Epic Fantasy. Illustrated by Nicole Cardiff. Fantasist Enterprises. ISBN 9781934571026.
- — (Feb 2010). "Mélanie". Realms of Fantasy.
- — (Feb 2010). "The Wind-Blown Man". Asimov's Science Fiction.
  - Reprinted: — (9 Apr 2013). "The Wind-Blown Man". In Mendes, Roberto; Loureiro (eds.). International Speculative Fiction 2012 Annual Anthology. Hipper Tiger Books. ISBN 9781927624029.
- —; Powell, Gareth L. (30 Mar 2010). "The Church of Accelerated Redemption". Shine: An Anthology of Optimistic SF. Solaris Books. ISBN 9781849971669.
- — (Jun 2010). "Desaparecidos". Realms of Fantasy.
- — (17 Jun 2010). "Memories in Bronze, Feathers, and Blood". Beneath Ceaseless Skies. No. 45.
- — (Summer 2010). "As the Wheel Turns". GUD Magazine. No. 6.
  - Reprinted: — (5 Oct 2012). "As the Wheel Turns". In Adams, John Joseph (ed.). Epic: Legends of Fantasy. Tachyon Publications. ISBN 9781616961060.
  - Reprinted: — (Nov 2012). "As the Wheel Turns". Lightspeed. No. 30.
- — (1 Sep 2010). "Father's Flesh, Mother's Blood". In Sizemore, Jason (ed.). Dark Futures: Tales of Dystopian SF. Dark Quest LLC. ISBN 9780982619728.
- — (30 Sep 2010). "Father's Last Ride". In Rafala, Carmelo (ed.). The Immersion Book of SF. Immersion Press. ISBN 9780956392411.
- — (Sep–Oct 2010). "Age of Miracles, Age of Wonders". Interzone. No. 230.
- — (8 Nov 2010). "Silenced Songs". In Harding, Mark (ed.). Music for Another World. Mutation Press. ISBN 9781907553004.
- — (Winter 2010). "Blessing the Earth". Tales of Moreauvia. Vol. 1, no. 3.
- — (Apr 2011). "Exodus Tides". InterGalactic Medicine Show. No. 22.
- — (5 Apr 2012). "Prayers of Forges and Furnaces". In Wallace, Sean (ed.). The Mammoth Book of Steampunk. Constable & Robinson.
  - — (Sep 2014). "Prayers of Forges and Furnaces". Lightspeed. No. 52.
- — (Summer 2012). "Heaven Under Earth". Electric Velocipede. No. 24.
- — (May–Jun 2013). "The Angel at the Heart of the Rain". Interzone. No. 246.
- — (31 May 2014). "The Dust Queen". In Strahan, Jonathan (ed.). Reach for Infinity. Solaris Books. ISBN 9781781082027.
- — (2 Oct 2014). "The Moon Over Red Trees". Beneath Ceaseless Skies. No. 157.
- — (8 Jun 2016). Engle-Laird, Carl (ed.). "Lullaby for a Lost World". Illustrated by Alyssa Winans. Tor.com.
- — (30 Aug 2017). "Cicada Song, in a Country Since Long Gone". In Gilman, Laura Anne; Richardson, Kat (eds.). The Death of All Things. Zombies Need Brains. ISBN 9781940709161.
- — (12 Sep 2017). "In Everlasting Wisdom". In Strahan, Jonathan (ed.). Infinity Wars. Solaris Books. ISBN 9781781084915.
- — (2 Nov 2017). "At the Crossroads of Shadow and Bone". In Alexander, Alma (ed.). Children of a Different Sky. Kos Books. ISBN 9780578196664.
- — (26 Jun 2018). "The Counting of Vermillion Beads". In Oh, Ellen; Chapman, Elsie (eds.). A Thousand Beginnings and Endings. Greenwillow Books. ISBN 9780062671158.
- — (21 Nov 2018). "Among the Water Buffaloes, a Tiger's Steps". In Chambers, Selena; Heller, Jason (eds.). Mechanical Animals: Tales at the Crux of Creatures and Tech. Hex Publishers. ISBN 9780999773659.
- — (20 Aug 2019). "A Burning Sword For Her Cradle". In Datlow, Ellen (ed.). Echoes: the Saga Anthology of Ghost Stories. Saga Press. ISBN 9781534413467.
- — (18 Sep 2019). "What It Means to Burn". In Olive, Eric (ed.). Deep Signal: The Illustrated Anthology. Deep Signal. ISBN 9780578506081.
- — (13 Mar 2020). "In the Lands of the Spill". In VanderMeer, Ann (ed.). Avatars Inc: A Sci-Fi Anthology. Xprize Foundation. ISBN 9781734336214.
- — (7 Jul 2020). "The Inaccessibility of Heaven". Uncanny Magazine. No. 35.
- — (18 Nov 2020). "The Scholar of the Bamboo Flute". In Southard, Janine A. (ed.). Silk & Steel: A Queer Speculative Adventure Anthology. Cantina Publishing. ISBN 9781633270268.
- — (30 Nov 2020). "The Long Tail". Wired.
- — (24 Feb 2022). "At the Foot of the Dragon Stair". Beneath Ceaseless Skies. No. 350.
- — (5 Jun 2022). "Sword of Bone, Halls of Thorns". The Sunday Morning Transport.
- — (8 Oct 2024). "Autumn's Red Bird". In Das, Indrapramit (ed.). Deep Dream: Science Fiction Exploring the Future of Art. MIT Press. ISBN 9780262549080.
- — (6 May 2025). "The Breaker of Mountains and Rivers". Uncanny Magazine. No. 64.
- — (Summer 2025). "Descendant". F(r)iction. No. 24. Illustrated by Daniel Reneau.
