= British Fantasy Award for Best Novella =

Annual literary award for speculative fiction

- Awarded for: Works between 15,000 and 40,000 words
- Country: United Kingdom
- Presented by: British Fantasy Society
- First award: 2005; 21 years ago
- Most recent winner: The River Has Roots by Amal El-Mohtar
- Website: britishfantasysociety.org

The British Fantasy Award for Best Novella is a literary award given annually as part of the British Fantasy Awards.

== Winners and shortlists ==
* Winners

Year	Author	Work	Publisher	Ref.
2005	Christopher Fowler*	Breathe	Telos	
2005	Tim Lebbon	Dead Man's Hand	Necessary Evil Press	
2005	Steve Lockley	The Ice Maiden	Pendragon	
2005	Paul Lewis	The Ice Maiden	Pendragon	
2005	Lisa Tuttle	My Death	PS Publishing	
2005	Sean Wright	The Twisted Root of Jaarfindor	Crowswing Books	
2006	Stuart Young*	The Mask Behind the Face	The Mask Behind the Face and Other Stories	
2006	Jeffrey Ford	The Cosmology of the Wider World	PS Publishing	
2006	Sean Wright	Dark Tales of Space and Time	Crowswing Books	
2006	Guy Adams	Deadbeat	Humdrumming	
2006	Paul Meloy	Dying in the Arms of Jean Harlow (The Coming of the Autoscopes)	The Third Alternative, #39	
2006	Paul Kane	Signs of Life	Rainfall Books	
2006	Joe Hill	Voluntary Committal	PS Publishing	
2007	Paul Finch*	Kid	Choices	
2007	Ian McDonald	The Djinn's Wife	Asimov's Science Fiction, July 2006	
2007	Eric Brown	The Memory of Joy	Choices	
2007	Gary McMahon	Rough Cut	Pendragon	
2007	Simon Clark	She Loves Monsters	Necessary Evil Press	
2008	Conrad Williams*	The Scalding Rooms	PS Publishing	
2008	Tim Lebbon	After the War	Subterranean Press	
2008	Gary McMahon	All Your Gods Are Dead	Humdrumming	
2008	Del Stone Jr.	Black Tide	Telos	
2008	Conrad Williams	Rain	Gray Friar	
2008	Eric Brown	Starship Summer	PS Publishing	
2009	Tim Lebbon*	The Reach of Children	Humdrumming	
2009	Simon Clark	Cold Stone Calling	Tasmaniac Publications	
2009	Joe Hill	Gunpowder	PS Publishing	
2009	Gary McMahon	Heads	We Fade To Grey	
2009	Simon Bestwick	The Narrows	We Fade To Grey	
2010	Sarah Pinborough*	The Language of Dying	PS Publishing	
2010	Joel Lane	The Witnesses Are Gone	PS Publishing	
2010	Rob Shearman	Roadkill	Love Songs for the Shy and Cynical	
2010	Stephen Volk	Vardoger	Gray Friar	
2010	Rio Youers	Old Man Scratch	PS Publishing	
2011	Simon Clark*	Humpty's Bones	Telos	
2011	Stephen King	1922	Full Dark, No Stars	
2011	Andrew Hook	Ponthe Oldenguine	Atomic Fez	
2011	Paul Finch	Sparrowhawk	Pendragon	
2011	Tim Lebbon	The Thief of Broken Toys	ChiZine	
2012	Lavie Tidhar*	Gorel and the Pot Bellied God	PS Publishing	
2012	James Cooper	Terra Damnata	PS Publishing	
2012	Peter Crowther	Ghosts with Teeth	A Book of Horrors	
2012	Elizabeth Hand	Near Zennor	A Book of Horrors	
2012	John Ajvide Lindqvist	The Music of Bengt Karlsson, Murderer	A Book of Horrors	
2012	Robert Shearman	Alice Through the Plastic Sheet	A Book of Horrors	
2013	John Llewellyn Probert*	The Nine Deaths of Dr Valentine	Spectral	
2013	Gary Fry	The Respectable Face of Tyranny	Spectral	
2013	Michael Moorcock	Curaré	Zenith Lives!	
2013	Mike O'Driscoll	Eyepennies	TTA	
2014	Sarah Pinborough*	Beauty	Gollancz	
2014	Nina Allan	Spin	TTA	
2014	Nina Allan	Vivian Guppy and the Brighton Belle	Rustblind and Silverbright	
2014	Paul Meloy	Dogs With Their Eyes Shut	PS Publishing	
2014	Stephen Volk	Whitstable	Spectral	
2015	Stephen Volk*	Newspaper Heart	The Spectral Book of Horror Stories	
2015	Ray Cluley	Water for Drowning	This is Horror	
2015	Carole Johnstone	Cold Turkey	TTA	
2015	Mark West	Drive	Pendragon	
2016	Usman T. Malik*	The Pauper Prince and the Eucalyptus Jinn	Tordotcom	
2016	Paul Cornell	Witches of Lychford	Tordotcom	
2016	Cate Gardner	The Bureau of Them	Spectral	
2016	Mark Morris	Albion Fay	Spectral	
2016	Nnedi Okorafor	Binti	Tordotcom	
2017	Victor LaValle*	The Ballad of Black Tom	Tordotcom	
2017	Aliya Whiteley	Arrival of Missives	Unsung Stories	
2017	VH Leslie	Bodies of Water	Tordotcom	
2017	Seanan McGuire	Every Heart a Doorway	Tordotcom	
2017	Gary McMahon	The Grieving Stones	Horrific Tales Publishing	
2017	Cassandra Khaw	Hammers on Bone	Tordotcom	
2018	Ellen Klages*	Passing Strange	Tordotcom	
2018	Emma Newman	Brother's Ruin	Tordotcom	
2018	Alison Littlewood	Cottingley	NewCon	
2018	Tade Thompson	The Murders of Molly Southbourne	Tordotcom	
2018	Laura Mauro	Naming the Bones	Dark Minds Press	
2018	Joanne Harris	A Pocketful of Crows	Gollancz	
2019	Aliette de Bodard*	The Tea Master and the Detective	Subterranean Press	
2019	Nnedi Okorafor	Binti: The Night Masquerade	Tordotcom	
2019	Simon Bestwick	Breakwater	Tor Books	
2019	Hal Duncan	The Land of Somewhere Safe	NewCon	
2019	John Llewellyn Probert	The Last Temptation of Dr Valentine	Black Shuck	
2019	Brooke Bolander	The Only Harmless Great Thing	Tordotcom	
2020	Priya Sharma*	Ormeshadow	Tordotcom	
2020	Neon Yang	The Ascent to Godhood	Tordotcom	
2020	Nathan Ballingrud	Butcher's Table	Gallery/Saga Press	
2020	Rivers Solomon (Note: With Daveed Diggs, William Hutson, and Jonathan Snipes)	The Deep	Gallery/Saga Press	
2020	Gareth L. Powell	Ragged Alice	Tordotcom	
2020	Tade Thompson	The Survival of Molly Southbourne	Tordotcom	
2021	P. Djèlí Clark*	Ring Shout	Tordotcom	
2021	Shona Kinsella	The Flame and the Flood	Fox Spirit	
2021	Georgina Bruce	Honeybones	TTA	
2021	Zen Cho	The Order of the Pure Moon Reflected in Water	Tordotcom	
2021	Kit Power	A Song for the End	Horrific Tales	
2021	Stark Holborn	Triggernometry	Rattleback	
2022	Nino Cipri*	Defekt	Tordotcom	
2022	Shingai Njeri Kagunda	& This is How to Stay Alive	Neon Hemlock	
2022	Penny Jones	Matryoshka	Hersham Horror	
2022	Alix E. Harrow	A Spindle Splintered	Tordotcom	
2022	Premee Mohamed	These Lifeless Things	Solaris Books	
2022	Alan Garner	Treacle Walker	4th Estate	
2023	Rhiannon A. Grist*	The Queen of the High Fields	Luna Press	
2023	Malcolm Devlin	And Then I Woke Up	Tordotcom	
2023	Stewart Hotston	The Entropy of Loss	NewCon	
2023	Terry Grimwood	Interference	Elsewhen	
2023	Adrian Tchaikovsky	Ogres	Solaris Books	
2023	Priya Sharma	Pomegranates	PS Publishing	
2024	Indra Das*	The Last Dragoners of Bowbazar	Subterranean Press	
2024	David Green	The Darkness in the Pines	Eerie River Publishing	
2024	Tim Lebbon	The Last Day and the First	PS Publishing	
2024	Tracy Fahey	They Shut Me Up	PS Publishing	
2024	T. Kingfisher	Thornhedge	Titan Books	
2024	Fonda Lee	Untethered Sky	Tordotcom	
2025	Lorraine Wilson*	The Last to Drown	Luna Press	
2025	Neil Williamson	Charlie Says	Black Shuck Books	
2025	T. Kingfisher	What Feasts at Night	Titan Books	
2025	Kit Power	Millionaires Day	French Press	
2026	Amal El-Mohtar*	The River Has Roots	Arcadia	
2026	Andrew Knighton	Walking A Wounded Land	Wizard's Tower Press	
2026	C.L. Clark	Fate's Bane	Tordotcom	
2026	Eugen Bacon	The Nga'phandileh Whisperer: A Sauútiverse Novella	Stars and Sabres Publishing	
