= Jackdaw (novel) =

Tade Thompson novel (2022)

- Cover of the 2022 Cheerio edition
- Author: Tade Thompson
- Language: English
- Publisher: Cheerio Publishing
- Publication date: 2022

Jackdaw is a literary horror novel by British-Nigerian author Tade Thompson. It was published in 2022 by Cheerio Publishing.

== Plot ==
Jackdaw is a novel of metafiction, written by a fictional version of the author himself, who receives a request to write a book inspired by the work of the Irish painter Francis Bacon. During the execution of this commission, Thompson, who is attempting to enter the mind of the artist by exploring his psychology, first develops a sexual fixation with Henrietta Moraes, one of Bacon's models, has a number of alarming encounters with the ghost of Bacon's nanny; seeks release in sexual experimentation with the help of a professional dominatrix, and experiences distressing fugues. Thompson, like the author himself, is a mental health worker as well as a writer of science fiction, and his obsession impacts on both his professional and his family life. While he attempts to keep up a pretence of normality for the sake of his family, a bizarre flesh-sculpture appears and grows in Thompson's attic study, reflecting both his own deteriorating state of mind and his possession by Bacon's influence.

When Thompson finally suffers a complete breakdown and is committed to a mental health institution, his obsession is found to be linked to a frontal lobe injury, which doctors assure him is curable.

== Background ==
On writing the novel, Thompson says: "Science fiction led me to Bacon. The xenomorph in Alien was designed by H.Giger, who took inspiration from a Bacon painting."

Thompson explains in interview that the protagonist of Jackdaw is not himself, although they happen to share the same name, the same agent, profession and family situation. He says: "The name was a stumbling block. I kept reminding myself that this dude was not me, therefore there was no dignity to hold on to."

Themes of the book include: Yoruba religious practice; the "blurred lines between creativity and madness," as well as "the thinness of the boundary between art and artist, subject and object."

== Reception ==
Jackdaw was longlisted for a 2022 British Science Fiction Award in the Best Novel category

Lisa Tuttle, writing for The Guardian, describes Jackdaw as: "A wild, darkly comic nightmare set on the borderlines of creativity, imagination and madness."
