= If at First You Don't Succeed, Try, Try Again =

Fantasy short story by Zen Cho

"If At First You Don't Succeed, Try, Try Again" is a fantasy short story by Zen Cho. It was first published on the official Barnes & Noble blog, in 2018.

== Synopsis ==
Byam is an imugi who desperately wants to ascend to dragonhood; however, because human perception interferes with the process of ascension, Byam is forced to devise an alternate plan, which has effects it could never have expected.

== Reception ==
"If at First You Don't Succeed, Try, Try Again" won the 2019 Hugo Award for Best Novelette.

James Nicoll considered the story to be "a pleasing change of pace" from more violent themes, and found it "surprisingly easy to identify with Byam", who he compared to "the coyote who always fails to catch the roadrunner".

Aliette de Bodard called it "sweet and powerful and just right".
