= Far from the Light of Heaven =

2021 science fiction novel by Tade Thompson

- Author: Tade Thompson
- Language: English
- Genre: Science fiction; mystery novel
- Published: 26 Oct 2021
- Publisher: Orbit Books
- Publication place: United Kingdom
- Pages: 400
- ISBN: 978-0-759-55791-8

Far from the Light of Heaven is a 2021 science fiction mystery novel by Tade Thompson. It was a finalist for the 2022 Philip K. Dick Award and 2022 Nommo Award for Best Novel.

== Plot ==
Captain Michelle “Shell” Campion boards the starship Ragtime for a journey to the colony planet Bloodroot. She awakens to find that the AI captain is compromised and that 31 passengers have been murdered and dismembered. The victims include Yan Maxwell, the richest man in the Solar System and owner of the mega-corporation MaxGalactix. Investigator Rasheed Fin is on Bloodroot when he receives a distress call from Campion. On Bloodroot, humans and alien Lambers share a mostly peaceful existence. Fin's most recent assignment went wrong and a high-ranking Lamber was killed. Despite being on suspension, Fin is sent into orbit to discover what has transpired with Ragtime. He and Salvo, an AI companion, meet Campion.

Lawrence “Larry” Biz, Governor of Space Station Lagos, learns that the Ragtime has not landed on Bloodroot as scheduled. Larry and his half-Lamber daughter Joké take a shuttle to Ragtime. Several catastrophes occur on the ship, including the loss of life support, disruption of communication with Bloodroot, and the release of experimental animal and plant species which attack the survivors. Shell finds a man named Jeremiah Brisbane aboard the ship.

A flashback reveals how Brisbane arrived on the ship. He is a member of the Tehani, a group of miners. They have been working for MaxGalactix under terrible conditions, resulting in early death due to poisoning. The Tehani equipped Brisbane with an AI named Carmilla and sent them to assassinate Maxwell. On Ragtime, Brisbane confronted Maxwell but was unable to kill him in cold blood. Carmilla killed Maxwell and several other passengers, then disabled Ragtime. Carmilla wishes to broadcast an anti-capitalist message to other mining colonies like the Tehani. Carmilla steals a shuttle and forces Brisbane aboard. Ragtime begins to crash into Bloodroot's atmosphere, killing Larry and many sleeping passengers. Brisbane fights against Carmilla and is killed by Bloodroot soldiers. Carmilla uses Lamber technology to broadcast her message before shutting down.

In retaliation for Maxwell's death, MaxGalactix ships attack Space Station Lagos. The station severs the portal between Lagos and Earth, giving them several decades to begin a weapons program before resuming contact. Campion and Fin remain stranded on Bloodroot. Campion cannot her escape feelings of responsibility for the Ragtime disaster.

== Major themes ==
Writing for Locus, Ian Mond writes about the intersection between the Lagos solar system and MaxGalactix. The novel explores Afrofuturist ideas and "depicts a future where black folk, particularly those descended from Nigeria, are flourishing in the dark reaches of space." However, this is only possible because they "serve, or at least don’t interfere with, the interests of Yan Maxwell".

In Mond's view, Maxwell is "more of a Musk than a Bezos", and his exploitation of the Tehani is the "very act of slow genocide that the plot of the novel pivots around". Writing for Tor.com, Alexis Ong states that the Tehani "serve mostly as a stand-in for the multitude of oppressed indigenous communities in our current reality, as well as those that will inevitably fuel the future wave of space colonization with their bones and blood."

== Style ==
A review by Grant Wythoff in the Los Angeles Review of Books states that Tade Thompson's novel is a re-working of the idea of space opera. According to Wythoff, space opera is "typically seen as (and often [is]) the least literary form of [science fiction]". Modern-day authors in this subgenre "are processing the consequences of having left [Earth]", especially in terms of the modern-day climate crisis. Authors like Thompson are "fully aware of the subgenre’s legacy as a literature of colonial expansion and military conquest". Thompson's use of the subgenre contrasts with an older view of space exploration that is mostly led by government programs such as NASA. The character of Yan Maxwell is the head of a private company that expands into space, which is comparable to the figures of Elon Musk and Jeff Bezos; Maxwell was also inspired by the short fiction of Robert Heinlein.

== Reception ==
Writing for The Guardian, Lisa Tuttle called the novel "probably the best science fiction novel of the year", writing that it is "like the Tardis, larger inside than out, with a range of ideas, characters and fascinating future settings". A review for Tor.com stated that the novel "offers refreshing perspectives on both terrestrial and space colonialism, the impact of multiculturalism and Blackness in a realm historically dominated by white capitalism."

A review in Kirkus called the novel "gripping and bloody as a beating heart but with a strong need for follow up". The novel commented that the plot initially reads as a locked room mystery in the style of Agatha Christie, but that the author does not give the reader enough clues to solve the mystery. Instead, he reveals most of the answers halfway through the novel, creating a "genuinely exciting race against time". The review also notes that the novel is "considerably less drenched in the hallucinatory than Thompson's Wormwood Trilogy", but that the supernatural elements at the end of the novel leave it open-ended for the possibility of a sequel. Author Amal El-Mohtar wrote that the "short, choppy chapters are both methodical and kaleidoscopic". She felt that the style is "sometimes disorienting and sometimes curt" but that "I’ll keep my fingers crossed for any of the several potential sequel hooks ".

A review in Lightspeed Magazine praised Thompson's ability to combine elements from various different genres and found Shell's voice to be gripping, but criticized the reveal of the killer as "spoon-fed". Ian Mond of Locus stated "I loved Thompson’s characters and the hectic plot ricocheting from one revelation to the next". Despite this, Mond found the prose to be too expository and felt that the "screech-to-a-halt-ending gives the book an unfinished feel."

The novel was a finalist for the 2022 Philip K. Dick Award and the 2022 Nommo Award for Best Novel.
