= Black Water Sister =

2021 fantasy novel by Zen Cho

- Author: Zen Cho
- Language: English
- Set in: Penang
- Publisher: Ace/Berkley
- Publication date: 11 May 2021
- Pages: 384 (hardcover)
- ISBN: 978-0-425-28343-1

Black Water Sister is a 2021 fantasy novel by Zen Cho. It focuses on Jessamyn Teoh, a closeted lesbian who moves from the United States to her birth country of Malaysia. In Malaysia, she meets the ghost of her deceased grandmother and becomes involved in a conflict related to a local deity. The book received critical praise, and was nominated for the 2022 Ignyte Award, Locus Award for Best Novel, and World Fantasy Award.

== Plot ==
After she graduates from Harvard, Jessamyn Teoh and her parents move back to her birth country of Malaysia. Jess is a closeted lesbian who is having difficulty finding work after graduation. After moving, Jess begins to hear the voice of her deceased grandmother, Ah Ma. In life, Ah Ma was a medium for a local deity known as the Black Water Sister. Ah Ma cannot cross into the afterlife until she takes revenge on Ng Chee Hin, a real estate developer who offended the Black Water Sister with plans to demolish her temple.

Jess visits the temple, where her maternal uncle Ah Cu serves as a medium. The temple is attacked by gang members with connections to Ng Chee Hin. Later, the Black Water Sister causes a scaffold to collapse at a nearby construction site. Jess realizes that the workers are suffering, despite the fact that they are only following the directions of Ng Chee Hin.

Jess meets Ng Wei Sherng, the son of Ng Chee Hin. Jess and Ah Cu meet Sherng at the temple. Ah Ma possesses Jess and attempts to kill Sherng in order to hurt his father. Jess breaks free from the possession and destroys the god's shrine. The Black Water Sister demands a sacrifice as recompense; she wants Jess to become her medium. The Black Water Sister reveals to Jess that she was once a human woman who was murdered in the woods where the temple now stands. Her anger prevents her from moving to the afterlife and turns her into a vengeful god.

Ah Ma tells Jess that Ng Chee Hin was once her lover, adding a personal element to her revenge campaign. Ah Cu is really Ng Chee Hin's son. Jess poses as a philanthropist and meets with Ng Chee Hin. His cronies kidnap her; the Black Water Sister possesses Jess and fights them off. Jess returns to the temple and restores the shrine. She convinces the god to end her quest for vengeance and move on to the afterlife; Ah Ma disappears as well. Jess accepts a job in Singapore and decides to come out to her parents before leaving Penang.

== Major themes ==
Gary K. Wolfe wrote that the novel explores cultural homophobia. The novel does not shy away from Malaysian attitudes toward homosexuality; in fact, one of Jess's scariest visions involves her relatives evicting her when they discover her sexual orientation. Liz Bourke wrote that the novel was grounded in a very specific place, being George Town, Penang. It is also rooted in a specific immigrant experience. Jess returns to a birth country that she hardly knows, and to "family that are familiar strangers with complicated, impenetrable histories." In a review for Strange Horizons, Subashini Navaratnam commented on the novel's first two sentences. As the novel opens, Ah Ma refers to Jess as a "pengkid", a slang term for a tomboy or lesbian. This introduction places Jess at the center of the "right-wing politics and the culture wars" that influence modern-day Malaysian society.

Subashini Navaratnam wrote that religion is the "essential theme" of Cho's work. Both gods and humans contribute to injustice in the novel; there is an unequal distribution of power and resources. This is especially true regarding female characters. For example, a male character becomes a god after living a pious life, while the Black Water Sister becomes a god only because she suffered a horrible death. In Navaratnam's opinion, this accurately reflects the culture of modern Malaysia, in which gods and dark spirits are often blamed for people's misfortunes. Jess compares this "social helplessness" to "a prison of our own making," because consulting a god is easier than unionizing for the betterment of society.

Much of the book focuses on the relationships between Jess, Ah Ma, and the Black Water Sister. An interviewer for NPR noted that the three characters form a "mother-maiden-crone trio". Cho agreed that the characters function as "images" of each other.

== Style ==
Many instances of the dialogue are written in Manglish, or Malaysian English. In an interview with NPR, Cho stated that Manglish was her first language, making it easy to write the dialogue. Cho also felt strongly that there should not be a glossary, footnotes, or other explanations of the words which might be unfamiliar to Western audiences; she prefers readers to figure things out from context.

== Reception ==
A review in Kirkus Reviews called the novel "a charming romp", praising Cho's "evocation of place". Publishers Weekly called the novel a "must read", praising the "endearing" relationship between Jess and Ah Ma.

Writing for Locus Online, Gary K. Wolfe praised the novel's exploration of "family, culture, and identity" in addition to the "suspenseful" supernatural elements. Writing for Tor.com, Liz Bourke called the novel a "generous, kind, and ... affirming romp". A reviewer for Strange Horizons wrote that the novel was a "pleasure on multiple levels" while also stating that the end felt "too pat, too tidy".

Olivia Ho of The Straits Times gave the book four out of five stars, calling it a "spirited read" and praising the juxtaposition of supernatural and mundane elements. The Straits Times also named Black Water Sister one of its top 10 books of 2021. Polgygon named Black Water Sister one of its top 20 science fiction and fantasy novels of 2021. Reviewers from Tor.com named the novel as one of their top novels from 2021.

== Awards ==
Year	Award	Category	Result	Ref
2021	Kitschies	Red Tentacle (Novel)	Finalist	
2022	Ignyte Award	Adult Novel	Finalist	
2022	Locus Award	Fantasy Novel	Finalist	
2022	RUSA CODES Reading List	Fantasy	Shortlisted	
2022	World Fantasy Award	Novel	Nominated	
