= The Secrets of Jin-Shei =

Novel by Alma Alexander

- Author: Alma Alexander
- Publisher: HarperCollins
- Publication date: April 27, 2004
- ISBN: 0-06-056341-9

The Secrets of Jin-Shei is a novel written by American author Alma A. Hromic (as Alma Alexander), published by HarperCollins in April 2004 in the United States, and also published in several other countries in a total of fourteen languages.

== Plot summary ==
The novel is set in Syai, an imaginary Chinese kingdom. Jin-shei is a pledge given by one woman to another, and once accepted can never be broken. This declaration of loyalty transcends social class and customs. Through jin-ashu, a unique language passed on from generation to generation of women (inspired by a real example of secret women's writing, nüshu), the lives within the sisterhood continue to intertwine throughout time.

The story begins with Tai, daughter of a court seamstress, who becomes jin shei bao of the Little Empress Antian. An earthquake claims the lives of the royal family, leaving an obstinate Liudan, Antian's younger sister, as the unexpected new Empress. Antian, during her dying moments, binds Tai to look after her sister.

Tai is comforted by Yuet, an apprentice healer. A new pledge is made, and Tai finds herself with a new jin shei bao who works tirelessly to bridge the gap between Tai and Liudan. The initial moves are tentative, for Liudan remains insecure throughout her lonely life in the imperial court.

During her time of sorrow, Tai is also consoled by her childhood friend Nhia. A club-footed young girl, Nhia grew up in the vicinity of the great temple, and has learned much about the Way. She is a sage with a pure heart who later becomes Syai Chancellor. It is also at the temple that Nhia meets Khailin, to whom she pledges sisterhood. A restless soul, Khailin is actively seeking knowledge about the Way. However, her thirst for information leads her down the path of darker forces. Khailin secretly marries the Ninth Sage Lihui.

Within Liudan’s court, an exceptional young Guard trainee named Xaforn is injured and Yuet is summoned to heal her. Xaforn is jin shei bao to Qiaan, binding their lives beyond adoptive sisterhood. Xaforn is protective by nature, while Qiaan is nurturing.

Through a series of events, the circle of sisterhood between these young ladies will test their loyalty, determination, courage and bravery. Liudan, in her quest for absolute rule over her empire, declares herself to be Dragon Empress. However, when the existence of Tammary, the late Emperor’s illegitimate daughter with a Traveller, comes to light, Liudan becomes obsessed by her need to maintain her power. In order to protect Tammary, Tai pledges sisterhood and tries to act as the peacemaker. Qiaan is then discovered to be the daughter of Cai, the Ivory Emperor's concubine, and becomes a pawn of Lihui, who wants to rule as Emperor and overthrow Liudan.

An increasingly insecure Liudan resorts to extraction of duties of sisterhood despite mistrusting her sisters who try fervently to bring her back to their fold, to a life with some sense of calm and peace. They fail, and their failure comes with a huge price, as one sister after another dies.

The story ends with Tai in her old age, looking back to her youth and reminiscing that her life was joyful yet marred by occasions of unhappiness.
