= The Rosewater Insurrection =

2019 science fiction novel by Tade Thompson

- Author: Tade Thompson
- Language: English
- Series: Wormwood Trilogy
- Genre: Science fiction
- Set in: Nigeria
- Publisher: Orbit
- Publication date: 12 Mar 2019
- Pages: 419
- ISBN: 9780316449083
- Preceded by: Rosewater
- Followed by: The Rosewater Redemption

The Rosewater Insurrection is a 2019 science fiction novel by Tade Thompson. It is the second book in the Wormwood Trilogy. It follows 2016's Rosewater and was followed by The Rosewater Redemption, also published in 2019.

== Plot ==
In 2055, an S45 sensitive named Eric is assigned to assassinate Jack Jacques, but gets cold feet. Jacques survives, and Eric remains as a disgraced agent.

In 2067, Aminat is working for S45, attempting to find a cure for xenoforms. Xenoforms are slowly replacing all human cells; humanity is projected to be completely replaced within decades.

Anthony, the human avatar of Wormwood, receives a message from Home, his native planet. Wormwood is a footholder, a sentient but lesser species than Homians. Footholders require another sentient being, such as a human or Homian, to serve as their host. Home is now uninhabitable; Homians now exist only as digitized copies of their former selves. Homians planned to find Home-like worlds, replace the native fauna with xenoforms, and upload their consciousnesses into these new life forms. The first human has become 100% xenoform, but an attempted consciousness upload has failed. A Homian scientist orders Anthony to investigate. Anthony finds that a Homian species of plant, which disrupts xenoforms, has appeared in Rosewater.

Meanwhile, a woman named Alyssa Sutcliffe awakens to find that she has lost all of her memories. She begins experiencing memories from a Homian consciousness. Aminat extracts Alyssa from a hospital.

Jack Jacques is now the mayor of Rosewater. The Nigerian president attempts to assassinate him. Jacques declares Rosewater an independent city-state. He has a contentious partnership with Femi Alaagomeji, head of S45; Femi instructs him to contact Kaaro for help. Riots disrupt the city. Aminat and Alyssa search for safety. Alyssa grows to like Aminat and to understand more about humans during this journey. Eventually, Kaaro, Alyssa, and Aminat reach the mayor's mansion.

With S45's help, Eric has survived the culling of human sensitives. He is ordered to kill Jacques. Eric bombs Jacques's car; Jacques loses his leg, but survives. Eric escapes Rosewater.

The alien plant begins taking on humanoid shapes and attacking Wormwood's dome. The populace begins referring to the plant creatures as Beynons. Kaaro and Aminat enter the dome. Molara tells them that Anthony is dead and Wormwood is dying; it needs a new host. Kaaro kills the Beynons, and Alyssa becomes the new host for Wormwood. She removes the dome and drives the Nigerian army away from Rosewater, solidifying its status as an independent state. Meanwhile, Jacques has Femi arrested and imprisoned.

The Homians agree to stop replacing living humans. Instead, they will occupy the bodies of reanimates. Thousands of Homians download their consciousnesses into Rosewater, ushering in a new era for humanity and Homians alike.

== Major themes ==
In a review for Los Angeles Review of Books, Jessica FitzPatrick states that the nations of the Wormwood trilogy respond to the threat of alien invasion as a result of their relationship with colonialism. Nations such as Great Britain and the United States, which were imperialist, were "quickly destroyed or driven into an isolationist retreat". Nations such as Nigeria, which already survived an invasion by the British, "successfully formed pockets of resistance or adapted to living with the invaders".

According to the same review, the secession of Rosewater from Nigeria is intended to evoke memories of the Biafran War. Jacques's assistant gives him a copy of the Ahiara Declaration for inspiration as he prepares to declare his city's independence. FitzPatrick states that this invocation "encourages readers to reconsider the brutality of real Earth history as well as the justifications of the communities in conflict".

Writing for Strange Horizons, Gautam Bhatia states that Rosewater is about first contact while its sequel is about conflict. On one level, conflict arises between humans and Homians; there is also conflict between various human factions. Femi Alaagomeji and the Nigerian government are firmly against Wormwood. When viewing the brutality of Nigerian soldiers against Rosewater's citizens, Kaaro and Aminat take a more nuanced view. They choose to save Wormwood even if it means accelerating the timeline of Earth's colonization by aliens.

In works of science fiction such as The Three-Body Problem by Liu Cixin, Bhatia writes that the author portrays a civilization vastly superior to humanity. Aliens in this novel refer to humans as "bugs". Similarly, Thompson portrays the Homians as very advanced, once comparing the relationship between Homians and humans to that of humans and meat animals. However, Thompson uses the character of Alyssa to combine both Homian and human perspectives and approach the relationship between the two species on "nearly equal" terms.

Gary K. Wolfe wrote that the novel intentionally evokes other famous works. The Beynon plant is named for John Wyndham, creator of triffids, one of whose middle names was Beynon. Wormlike alien creatures evoke the sandworms of Dune; Thompson also quotes the works of Stephen King and Oscar Wilde.

== Style ==
According to Gary K. Wolfe, the novel is mostly told through four viewpoint characters: Aminat, Alyssa, Anthony, and Jacques. Kaaro, the protagonist of the first novel, is "mostly offstage" throughout The Rosewater Insurrection. There are also minor viewpoint characters including Eric, a man who is eaten by the Beynon plant, and a novelist whose chapter "seems mostly a shorthand way to deliver summary exposition beyond the limits of the other viewpoints".

== Reception ==
Kirkus called the novel a "complexly layered and action-packed middle volume". In a joint review for The Rosewater Insurrection and The Rosewater Redemption, the Los Angeles Review of Books compared the novels to the wormwood plant. It called the novels "aptly named", with "a bitter undercurrent that I find difficult to fully shake from my mind". Writing for Locus, Gary K. Wolfe called the novel "more traditional" than its predecessor, as "a decades-long slow burn of an alien invasion here gives way to a shooting war". Wolfe found that the "pace is faster, the stakes far more immediate, and the characters as vivid as ever" as he eagerly awaited the conclusion of the trilogy. Writing for Strange Horizons, Gautam Bhatia wrote that the novel portrayed "one of the more sensitive, nuanced, and moving accounts of a human/alien relationship".

Writing for Tor.com, Liz Bourke commented that she could "admire its craft" but found its characters were difficult to like, which limited her enjoyment of the book.

Awards and honors
Year	Work	Award	Category	Result	Ref.
2019	The Rosewater Insurrection	BSFA Award	Novel	Shortlisted	
2020	The Rosewater Insurrection	Locus Award (Note: The Rosewater Insurrection and The Rosewater Redemption were jointly nominated for the 2020 Locus Award for Best Science Fiction Novel.)	Science Fiction Novel	Finalist	
2020	The Rosewater Insurrection	Nommo Award	Novel	Shortlisted	
2020	The Wormwood Trilogy	Hugo Award	Series	Finalist	
