= The Survival of Molly Southbourne =

2019 novella by Tade Thompson

- First edition
- Author: Tade Thompson
- Cover artist: Wojciech Zwolinski
- Language: English language
- Genre: Horror, Thriller
- Set in: United Kingdom
- Publisher: Tor.com
- Publication date: 9 July 2019
- Publication place: United Kingdom
- Media type: Paperback
- Pages: 128
- ISBN: 9781250217257
- Preceded by: The Murders of Molly Southbourne
- Followed by: The Legacy of Molly Southbourne

The Survival of Molly Southbourne is a 2019 horror novella by Nigerian-British writer Tade Thompson. It is the sequel to The Murders of Molly Southbourne (2017) and was followed by The Legacy of Molly Southbourne (2022).

== Plot ==
At the end of the first novel, the original Molly Southbourne committed suicide by burning down her house, leaving her doppelgänger alive. The new Molly escapes from the house and uses a phone booth to call a number that has been tattooed on her arm. Agents arrive to whisk her to safety. Molly pretends to be the original Molly (Molly Prime) in order to satisfy them.

As the story progresses, it is interspersed with scenes of a video transcript of James Down. He discusses how he plans to make himself gain weight and try to survive the “birth” of his own molly.

Molly has several violent encounters with police and government agents. Molly is attacked and kidnapped by multiple copies of a woman named Tamara. Tamara is a Prime; she can produce duplicates. Unlike Molly Prime, Tamara’s duplicates do not seem to attack her. Tamara and the government agents appear to be working at cross purposes.

Tamara takes Molly to Vitali Ignatiy Nikitovich, a Russian scientist who knew Molly Prime’s mother. Molly overhears Tamara Prime discussing her with Vitali, and Molly runs away. Molly breaks into Vitali’s house, where she finds that two mollys who survived the fire are being kept in the basement. She takes the surviving mollys to James Down, her only remaining potential ally. She reaches James’s house just as his abdomen ruptures and a molly emerges. Molly convinces the new clone that they can all coexist.

Molly and her clones (Mollyann, Moya, and Molina) move to Dorset. Molly abandons the persona of Molly Southbourne and hopes to survive as a new person.

== Reception ==
The book received several positive reviews. Publishers Weekly called it "terrifying and poignant", and noted that it "poses thoughtful questions about identity and what it means to be human." Library Journal called it "captivatingly bloody" and "just as chilling as its predecessor."

A review from Booklist called it a story "that cross the borders between horror, dystopian tales, and science fiction."

Awards and honors
Year	Award	Category	Result	Ref.
2019	BSFA Award	Shorter Fiction	Shortlisted	
2020	British Fantasy Award	Novella	Shortlisted	
2020	Ignyte Award	Novella	Finalist	
