= The Rosewater Redemption =

2019 science fiction novel by Tade Thompson

- Author: Tade Thompson
- Language: English
- Series: The Wormwood Trilogy
- Genre: Science fiction; Africanfuturism
- Set in: Nigeria, 2060s
- Published: 15 October 2019
- Publisher: Orbit Books
- Publication place: United Kingdom
- Pages: 419 (hardcover)
- ISBN: 978-0-316-44909-0
- Preceded by: The Rosewater Insurrection

The Rosewater Redemption is a 2019 science fiction novel by Tade Thompson. It is the final book in the Wormwood trilogy, preceded by Rosewater (2016) and The Rosewater Insurrection (2019). It was a finalist for the 2020 Locus Award for Best Science Fiction Novel.

== Plot ==
Eighteen months after the events of “The Rosewater Insurrection”, the Nigerian government and Rosewater remain opposed. Femi Alaagomeji is released as part of a hostage exchange. In Nigeria, Femi, Eric, and Oyin Da work to end the Homian presence on Earth. Femi convinces Kaaro to join their cause.

Oyin Da once worked on a machine built with alien technology. The machine exploded, allowing her to see multiple possible futures. She eventually learns that the original Oyin Da was killed in the explosion; she now exists as a non-physical being, a pattern of thought remaining in the xenosphere.

In Rosewater, the Homians and humans share an uneasy existence. Koriko, the new name for the Alyssa/Wormwood avatar, continues to protect Rosewater from Nigeria and to transfer the consciousnesses of Homians into available human bodies. Homians begin murdering humans in order to take control of their corpses. Koriko endorses this tactic as a means to increase the Homian population.

Hannah Jacques, the wife of the mayor, sues the Rosewater government and alleges that the takeover of human bodies is a civil rights violation. Though she loses the case, it inspires anti-Homian sentiment. Nigeria uses criminal factions to try to destabilize Rosewater's government. Kaaro is killed by one of these groups. His ghost remains in the xenosphere.

Femi and Oyin Da create a virus designed to destroy the Homians on their data servers, committing genocide to save humanity. Kaaro's consciousness is uploaded to Home. He destroys all of the Homians and then self-destructs. Wormwood abandons Rosewater, which devolves into chaos. Jack Jacques is presumed dead. Aminat escapes to Nigeria. Femi is arrested, but the incoming president promises to pardon her. The novels ends with Femi and Oyin Da discussing art in Femi's prison cell.

== Major themes ==
According to a review for The Guardian, The Rosewater Redemption explores the concept of personhood through the use of characters such as Oyin Da and Lora Asiko. Oyin Da no longer has a physical body and exists within the xenosphere; Asiko is Jack's robot and has control over her own programming.

The same review explores the concept of co-existence and colonization. The story is told from the perspective of a formerly colonized country, while countries such as the United States are absent from the main plot. Jack believes that the benefits of the aliens outweigh the risks of an eventual takeover. Characters such as Femi "look to their nation’s past for a lesson in the foolishness of hoping for the best from colonisers".

According to the Los Angeles Review of Books, Thompson's portrayal of Homian colonization forces readers to ask uncomfortable questions about environmentalism and colonization. For example, Homians have destroyed their own native ecology, which prompts the reader to consider "if a species deserves a second chance after polluting its own planet to death". Thompson codes the search for a new planet in terms of colonization and genocide. The review finds it interesting that readers are disturbed when an eradicated indigenous group is Homo sapiens, but not when it is a particular aboriginal community.

According to a review in Locus, Thompson also draws clear boundaries between asylum seekers and colonizers. Jack makes Rosewater a safe haven for LGBTQIA individuals, resulting in the first Pride March in Rosewater. Thompson criticizes Nigeria's persecution of minority groups, in contrast to the invading Homians. This distinction has been "blurred by the alt-right" in modern times, as immigrants and refugees have been called invaders.

== Style ==
According to the Los Angeles Review of Books, the choice of narrators changes the perceived speed of the novel. While Rosewater focused on one protagonist, the two sequels have several point of view characters. According to this review, "the rotating narration increases the speed of delivery".

== Reception ==
Writing for The Guardian, Abigail Nussbaum called the novel "a stunning conclusion to a trilogy that expands our understanding of what science fiction can do". Kirkus gave the novel a starred review, stating that it avoided the trope of "contentious nations of the world ... uniting despite their differences". Instead, the review stated that the novel "maintains a plausibility that others in this subgenre often lack." The Los Angeles Review of Books praised the novel's complex themes, writing that the series has "a bitter undercurrent that I find difficult to fully shake from my mind". Ian Mond and Gary K. Wolfe found the novel to be "morally and ethically fraught" as well as "intellectually satisfying".

Awards and honors
Year	Work	Award	Category	Result	Ref.
2020	The Rosewater Redemption	Dragon Award	Science Fiction Novel	Nominated	
2020	The Rosewater Redemption	Locus Award (Note: The Rosewater Insurrection and The Rosewater Redemption were jointly nominated for the 2020 Locus Award for Best Science Fiction Novel.)	Science Fiction Novel	Finalist	
2020	The Rosewater Redemption	Philip K. Dick Award	—	Nominated	
2020	The Wormwood Trilogy	Hugo Award	Series	Finalist	
