= Tade Thompson =

British-Nigerian speculative fiction writer

Tade Thompson FRSL
- Born: 1969 (age 56–57); London, United Kingdom
- Occupations: Writer, psychiatrist
- Writing career
- Period: 2005–present
- Genres: Science fiction, Horror
- Notable works: Rosewater The Murders of Molly Southbourne
- Notable awards: Arthur C. Clarke Award Nommo Award

Tade Thompson FRSL is a British psychiatrist and writer of Yoruba descent. He is best known for his 2016 science fiction novel Rosewater, which won a Nommo Award and an Arthur C. Clarke Award.

== Life and career ==
Thompson was born in London, England, to Yoruba parents. His family left the United Kingdom for Nigeria in 1976, when Thompson was seven. He grew up in Nigeria, where he studied medicine and social anthropology. He went on to specialise in psychiatry. He returned to the UK in 1998, where he has remained, except for a year spent working in Samoa.

As well as being an author, Thompson also works full-time at St James' Hospital, Portsmouth, where he specializes in mental illnesses in people with physical problems. In July 2020, he told The Guardian that he could not imagine leaving medicine, saying: “The hospital work is a calling. I help people.”

Thompson is also an illustrator and artist.

== Reception and awards ==
Thompson's novels and short stories have been critically well received, with critics commenting on their originality and breadth of vision. Thompson was a John W. Campbell Award finalist and has been shortlisted for the Shirley Jackson Award, the BSFA Award, and the Nommo Award. His novel Rosewater won the 2019 Arthur C. Clarke Award, making Thompson the second writer of black African heritage to win the prize.

In 2023, Thompson was elected a Fellow of the Royal Society of Literature.

Awards and honors
| Year | Work | Award | Category | Result | Ref. |
|---|---|---|---|---|---|
| 2016 | "The Apologists" | BSFA Award | Short Fiction | Shortlisted | |
| 2017 | The Last Pantheon (Note: Co-authored with Nick Wood) | Nommo Award | Novella | Shortlisted | |
| 2017 | The Murders of Molly Southbourne | BSFA Award | Shorter Fiction | Shortlisted | |
| 2017 | The Murders of Molly Southbourne | Shirley Jackson Award | Novella | Nominated | |
| 2017 | Rosewater | Campbell Memorial Award | — | Finalist | |
| 2017 | Rosewater | Nommo Award | Novel | Won | |
| 2018 | The Murders of Molly Southbourne | British Fantasy Award | Novella | Shortlisted | |
| 2018 | The Murders of Molly Southbourne | Nommo Award | Novella | Won | |
| 2018 | Rosewater | BSFA Award | Novel | Shortlisted | |
| 2019 | Rosewater | Arthur C. Clarke Award | — | Won | |
| 2019 | The Rosewater Insurrection | BSFA Award | Novel | Shortlisted | |
| 2019 | The Survival of Molly Southbourne | BSFA Award | Shorter Fiction | Shortlisted | |
| 2019 | "Yard Dog" | Theodore Sturgeon Award | — | Finalist | |
| 2020 | The Murders of Molly Southbourne | Grand Prix de l'Imaginaire | Foreign Short Fiction | Won | |
| 2020 | The Rosewater Insurrection | Locus Award (Note: The Rosewater Insurrection and The Rosewater Redemption were jointly nominated for the 2020 Locus Award for Best Science Fiction Novel.) | Science Fiction Novel | Finalist | |
| 2020 | The Rosewater Insurrection | Nommo Award | Novel | Shortlisted | |
| 2020 | The Rosewater Redemption | Dragon Award | Science Fiction Novel | Nominated | |
| 2020 | The Rosewater Redemption | Locus Award | Science Fiction Novel | Finalist | |
| 2020 | The Rosewater Redemption | Philip K. Dick Award | — | Nominated | |
| 2020 | The Survival of Molly Southbourne | British Fantasy Award | Novella | Shortlisted | |
| 2020 | The Survival of Molly Southbourne | Ignyte Award | Novella | Finalist | |
| 2020 | The Wormwood Trilogy | Hugo Award | Series | Finalist | |
| 2022 | Far from the Light of Heaven | Nommo Award | Novel | Shortlisted | |
| 2022 | Far from the Light of Heaven | Philip K. Dick Award | — | Finalist | |
| 2023 | The Legacy of Molly Southbourne | Philip K. Dick Award | — | Special Citation | |
| 2025 | "The Apologists" | BSFA Award | Shorter Fiction | Won | |

== Bibliography ==
=== Novels ===
==== The Wormwood Trilogy ====
- —— (2016). Rosewater (1st ed.). Apex.
  - —— (2018). Rosewater (paperback ed.). Orbit. pp. 1–432. ISBN 9780316449052.
- —— (2019). The Rosewater Insurrection (paperback ed.). Orbit. pp. 1–374. ISBN 9780316449083.
- —— (2019). The Rosewater Redemption (paperback ed.). Orbit. pp. 1–416. ISBN 9780316449090.

==== Stand-alone ====
- —— (2015). Making Wolf (hardcover 1st ed.). Rosarium Publishing. pp. 1–270. ISBN 9781495607486.
- —— (2021). Far from the Light of Heaven (hardcover 1st ed.). Orbit. pp. 1–384. ISBN 9780759557918.

=== Novellas and short fiction ===
==== The Molly Southbourne Trilogy ====
- The Murders of Molly Southbourne (2017)
- The Survival of Molly Southbourne (2019)
- The Legacy of Molly Southbourne (2022)

==== Stand-alone ====
- "The McMahon Institute for Unquiet Minds" (2005)
- "Slip Road" (2009)
- "Shadow" (2010)
- "Notes from Gethsemane" (2012)
- "Bicycle Girl" (2013)
- "One Hundred and Twenty Days of Sunlight" (2013)
- "Slip Road" (revised) (2014)
- "Budo or, The Flying Orchid" (2014)
- "The Monkey House" (2015)
- "Child, Funeral, Thief, Death" (2015)
- "The Last Pantheon" (2015) (with Nick Wood)
- "Decommissioned" (2016)
- "Household Gods" (2016)
- "The Apologists" (2016)
- "Gnaw" (2016)
- "Bootblack" (2017)
- "Yard Dog" (2018)
- "Jackdaw" (2022)
- "Doctor Who: Icons: One Night Only" (2025)

=== Poems ===
- "Komolafe" (2013)

=== Essays ===
- The Last Word on the Last Pantheon (2016) (with Nick Wood)
- Please Stop Talking about the 'Rise' of African Science Fiction (2018)

=== Contributor ===
- "Wherefore, Nuncle?" in Encounters with James Baldwin: Celebrating 100 Years (2024)

== Other work ==
- Omenana Magazine #4 (September 2015) (cover art)
- In Morningstar's Shadow: Dominion of the Fallen Stories by Aliette de Bodard (2015) (cover art)
