= The Murders of Molly Southbourne =

2017 horror novella by Tade Thompson

- First edition cover
- Author: Tade Thompson
- Genre: Horror, Thriller
- Publisher: Tor.com
- Publication date: 3 October 2017
- Media type: Paperback
- Pages: 128
- ISBN: 978-0765397133
- Followed by: The Survival of Molly Southbourne

The Murders of Molly Southbourne is a 2017 horror novella by Nigerian-British writer Tade Thompson. The plot covers the life of Molly Southbourne, who is afflicted by a mysterious condition. Every time she bleeds, a doppelgänger will grow from her blood and attempt to kill her. The novella has two sequels: The Survival of Molly Southbourne (2019) and The Legacy of Molly Southbourne (2022).

== Plot ==
A bruised and bloodied woman wakes chained to a wall, unable to remember her name or how she arrived in her situation. Her captor, a crazed woman named Molly Southbourne, tells her a story. Molly was raised in a secluded farm. Every time she bleeds, another molly appears. (The blood of other mollies, however, does not create more mollies). At first the mollies appear friendly, but in three days or less they will "turn bad" and try to murder her.

At college, Molly begins a short-lived relationship with a man named Leon. Molly's parents are killed by a molly. She drops out of college and is hired as a research assistant by anatomy professor James Down, whom she eventually dates. Molly finds a letter from her mother. As a government spy, her mother was ordered to steal the biomedical research of a professor investigating declining female fertility. She injected herself with an experimental fluid, leading to Molly's condition. James discovers that Leon was killed by his own molly, a slow-growing clone that eventually ruptured and killed him. James has been infected and will soon die as well. Molly builds a dungeon in her basement.

Molly reveals that the woman chained to the wall is the eleventh molly to appear since the construction of the dungeon, and the first which has not gone insane. Molly commits suicide and allows the new molly to take her place.

== Reception ==
The Murders of Molly Southbourne was well-received critically, with praise for its psychological themes. Some commentators compared the novel's plot to a parable about mental illness. Others compared it positively to other works featuring doppelgängers, such as "William Wilson" by Edgar Allan Poe. In a positive review, Publishers Weekly called the novella a "bloody exploration of identity and self".

Awards and honors
Year	Award	Category	Result	Ref.
2017	BSFA Award	Shorter Fiction	Shortlisted	
2017	Shirley Jackson Award	Novella	Nominated	
2018	British Fantasy Award	Novella	Shortlisted	
2018	Nommo Award	Novella	Won	
2020	Grand Prix de l'Imaginaire	Foreign Short Fiction	Won	

== Adaptations ==
In 2017, the novella was optioned by Welle Entertainment and Cathy Schulman was slated to produce a film adaptation, along with Krishnan Menon and Adam Stone. As of 2020, the series had been optioned by Edgar Wright's, Nira Park's, Joe Cornish's and Rachael Prior's production company Complete Fiction, for the streaming service Netflix. It was both Thompson's first work and the first Tor.com novella to be optioned.
