= The Order of the Pure Moon Reflected in Water =

2020 novella by Zen Cho

- Author: Zen Cho
- Cover artist: Sija Hong
- Language: English
- Genre: Fantasy; Wuxia
- Publisher: Tordotcom
- Publication date: 23 Jun 2020
- Publication place: United Kingdom
- Pages: 160 (hardcover)
- ISBN: 9781250269256

The Order of the Pure Moon Reflected in Water is a 2020 wuxia novella by Zen Cho. It was a finalist for the 2021 Locus Award for Best Novella, Lambda Literary Award for Science Fiction, Fantasy, and Horror, and British Fantasy Award for Best Novella.

== Plot ==
A man named Lau Fung Cheung visits a coffeehouse. He becomes involved in a quarrel when a customer harasses a waitress. The waitress, Guet Imm, is a votary of the Order of the Pure Moon Reflected in Water. As a result of the fight, she is fired. She follows Fung Cheung and joins his crew of men, who call themselves “contractors”.

Although second-in-command Tet Sang does not trust her, Guet Imm quickly bonds with the other men. Guet Imm is ignorant of current events, having lived in seclusion for many years until her monastery was burned down. Currently, a war between the Protectorate and the Reformists is putting all religious orders at risk. The contractors are transporting sacred relics to be sold on the black market. Tet Sang brings the relics to a buyer, but the deal is interrupted by Guet Imm. She accuses Tet Sang of blasphemy. Protectorate soldiers then arrive, hoping to arrest the contractors. Tet Sang and Guet Imm escape.

Tet Sang, Fung Cheung, and Guet Imm discuss the relics. The prospective buyer, Yeoh Thean Tee, is a wealthy but pious man. The Yeoh family would treat the relics respectfully and save them from the current war. They reconcile and retreat into the forest.

As Guet Imm dresses Tet Sang's wounds, she realizes that he is biologically female. (Note: The narrative continues to use masculine pronouns for Tet Sang, though he reports conflicted feelings about his gender identity.) She promises to keep Tet Sang's secret. Tet Sang reveals that he was previously a devotee of the Pure Moon. Before his monastery was destroyed, the Abbot made him promise to care for the relics. After learning the full story, Guet Imm agrees that they should sell the relics to the Yeoh family.

When the contractors reach the Yeoh family estate, they find that all of the Yeoh men have gone on a business trip. Guet Imm and Tet Sang begin negotiating with Yeoh Gaik Tin, the daughter of Yeoh Thean Tee. Gaik Tin is a former devotee of the Pure Moon. Gaik Tin does not remember Guet Imm, but was impressed by Tet Sang's lectures during his time as a devotee. She agrees to pay for the relics.

The contractors are ambushed by Reformist bandits, who do not want the relics to be sold. Guet Imm uses martial arts and mystical abilities to defeat the bandits, killing one. She realizes that the bandits will come after her, and decides to leave Fung Cheung's group for their own safety. Tet Sang joins Guet Imm, and the parties go their separate ways.

== Style ==
Gary K. Wolfe of Locus commented on the ways in which the novella uses tropes common in wuxia and American western stories. An an example, the book begins when "a bandit enters a coffeehouse [and] examines a wanted poster..." If the story took place in a saloon, Wolfe states, then the "scene would not be out of place in any number of classic Westerns." Also writing for Locus, Liz Bourke called the book "a deft and elegant re-envisioning of wuxia for an Anglophone audience."

== Reception and awards ==
Gary K. Wolfe of Locus praised the dialogue and the character of Guet Imm, calling her one of the more memorable characters of recent fantasy books. He stated that the book's appeal "derives from watching a smart, appealing, and intelligent woman finding her identity ... and making a choice in the end that is satisfyingly consistent with what she’s learned." Also writing for Locus, Liz Bourke "superbly drawn" worldbuilding packed into a small page count. Bourke concluded that the novella "has action and pathos and striking turns of phrase: it’s a small, perfectly shaped delight."

Maya Gittelman of Reactor praised the queering of the wuxia genre, stating that "[t]here’s violence and magic, but they’re used in quietly powerful, surprising ways." The same review also praised the romance and the emotional dynamics of the all-queer cast of characters. The review concluded by calling the book "an understated, brilliantly crafted adventure".

Publishers Weekly called the book a "whimsical fantasy novella." The review noted that it focuses on "more mischief than martial arts or magic" and that this might not fit the expectations of all readers. Nevertheless, the review stated that "fans of found family narratives will enjoy the band-of-brothers dynamic of the bandits."

Malavika Praseed of Chicago Review of Books stated the novella "draws upon wuxia narratives of ancient China and Malaysian cultural traditions, creating something entirely new and modern." The reviewer felt that Guet Imm's dialogue with the bandits was witty and was one of the best parts of the book. Praseed felt that the novella had some limitations, including limited space for worldbuilding and discussions on gender and sexuality. Nonetheless, the reviewer praised its "inventive concept, compelling character interactions, and poignant social commentary."

| Year | Award | Category | Result | Ref |
|---|---|---|---|---|
| 2021 | British Fantasy Award | Novella | Shortlisted | |
| 2021 | Lambda Literary Award | Sci-fi, Fantasy, and Horror | Finalist | |
| 2021 | Locus Award | Novella | Finalist | |
