= The Tea Master and the Detective =

2018 science fiction novella by Aliette de Bodard

- Author: Aliette de Bodard
- Language: English
- Genre: Science fiction
- Publisher: Subterranean Press
- Publication date: Mar 31, 2018
- Pages: 96 (hardcover)
- Awards: 2018 Nebula Award for Best Novella; 2019 British Fantasy Award for Best Novella
- ISBN: 978-1596068643

The Tea Master and the Detective is a 2018 science fiction novella by Aliette de Bodard. It is a standalone tale set in the author's Xuya Universe. The novella won the 2018 Nebula Award for Best Novella, 2019 British Fantasy Award for Best Novella, and was a finalist for other awards including the Hugo and Locus Awards.

== Plot ==
The Shadow’s Child is a sentient ship-mind whose crew was killed in deep spaces, a dimension which allows faster-than-light travel. Without outside assistance, humans in deep spaces experience severe side effects including mental breakdown. The Shadow's Child is now an herbalist who ekes out a living in the Scattered Pearls Belt, brewing medicinal teas to help travelers cope with the unreality of deep spaces.

Long Chau is a detective who hires The Shadow’s Child to journey into deep spaces in order to find a corpse. Long Chau hopes to study the effects of that dimension on the decomposition process. They visit a five-year-old shipwreck and retrieve a woman's body. Long Chau sees that the body has only been dead for about a year and suspects foul play.

They learn that the dead woman was a member of the Sisterhood, a union of working women. Grandmother Quay, the groups's leader, and The Sorrows of Four Gentlemen, a mindship, are suspects. Long Chau stows away on The Sorrows of Four Gentlemen, which enters deep spaces but breaks down. The Shadow’s Child enters deep spaces, confronting her own fears in order to mount a rescue. They learn that Grandmother Quay was using a cheap herbal blend in order to bring young women into deep spaces for religious rituals. Unfortunately, the drugs caused euphoria and suicide in some of the women. Quay is arrested.

Long Chau and The Shadow’s Child discuss Long Chau's past. Long Chau was once a tutor for a wealthy family; she helped her student escape and forge a new identity, even though this tarnished her reputation. The two agree to work on cases together in the future.

== Style ==
Writing for Kirkus, Ana Grilo stated that the character of Long Chau is based on Sherlock Holmes and that The Shadow's Child is based on Dr. Watson. The story is told primarily from the viewpoint of The Shadow's Child. Grilo states that "through her eyes, we feel her own fear and trauma just as we see her curiosity and attraction to the enigmatic figure of Long Chau".

== Background ==
The Tea Master and the Detective is the third standalone novella to be published in de Bodard's Xuya Universe, after On a Red Station, Drifting (2012) and The Citadel of Weeping Pearls (2015).

== Reception ==
Writing for the New York Times, author Amal El-Mohtar states that "this isn’t a tidy transposition of Holmes and Watson into far-future space, for all that the elements of homage ... shine through." El-Mohtar praised the work as "a window onto a beautifully developed world that widens the meaning of space opera", writing that it integrates Chinese and Vietnamese cultures instead of Western military conventions.

Library Journal gave the novella a starred review, calling it a "slim volume [that] packs a visceral punch" and "an imaginative read". Writing for Locus, Liz Bourke stated that the novella "preserves the empathy and the intensity of the original Sherlockian stories, while being told in de Bodard’s cut-glass prose and inimitable modern style". A review in Kirkus praised the novel's "beautiful mix of modern futures with on-going traditions", particularly commenting on the use of sentient mindships who are "tied to a specific culture with its own traditions". Publishers Weekly applauded the author's "convincingly gritty setting and a pair of unique characters with provocative histories and compelling motivations."

=== Awards ===
| Year | Award | Category | Result | Ref |
|---|---|---|---|---|
| 2018 | Nebula Award | Novella | Won | |
| 2019 | British Fantasy Award | Novella | Won | |
| 2019 | Hugo Award | Novella | Finalist | |
| 2019 | Locus Award | Novella | Finalist | |
| 2019 | World Fantasy Award | Novella | Finalist | |
