= Zen Cho =

Malaysian fantasy author (born 1986)

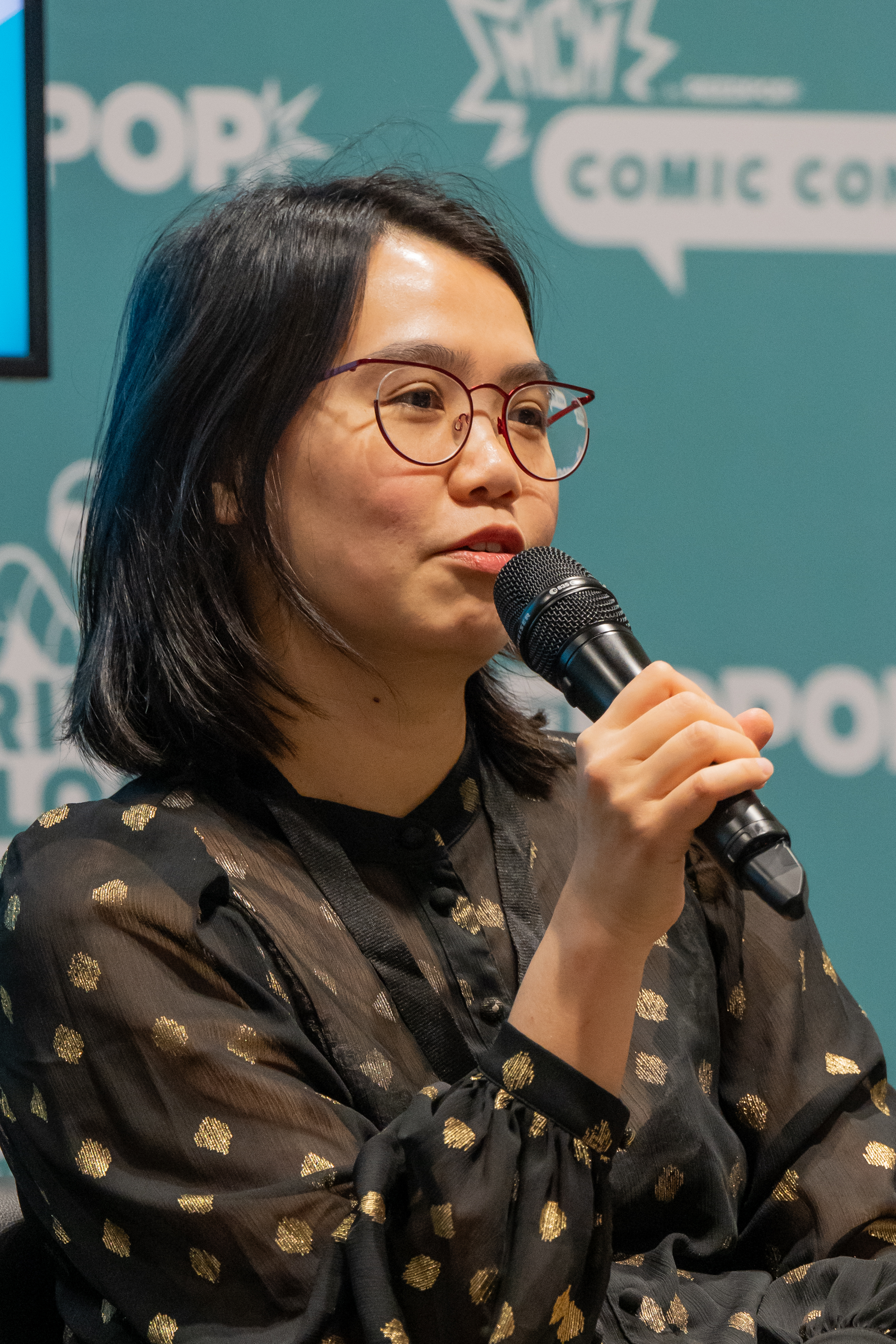
- At MCM London Comic Con, 24 October 2025
- Born: 1986 (age 39–40); Selangor, Malaysia
- Education: University of Cambridge
- Occupations: Author, lawyer
- Writing career
- Language: English
- Period: 2015–Present
- Genres: Speculative fiction; Romance
- Notable works: Spirits Abroad; Sorcerer to the Crown; Black Water Sister
- Notable awards: Crawford Award (2015); BFA–Newcomer (2016); Hugo–Novelette (2019); Ray Bradbury Prize (2021)
- Website: zencho.org

Zen Cho (born 1986) is a Malaysian fantasy author. She is known for her Sorcerer to the Crown series. She was the joint winner of the 2015 Crawford Award for her short story collection Spirits Abroad. The expanded edition of Spirits Abroad: Stories received the 2021 Ray Bradbury Prize.

== Background and education ==
Zen Cho was born in Selangor, Malaysia. She spent a brief period of time in the United States as a child, but was raised in Malaysia. She moved to the United Kingdom at 18 to attend university, where she met her husband. Cho earned a law degree from University of Cambridge.

== Career ==
Cho began publishing genre fiction in 2010. Many of those stories were republished in her debut short story collection, Spirits Abroad, originally published by Fixi Novo in 2014. The book won the 2015 Crawford Award in a tie with The Angel of Losses by Stephanie Feldman.

In 2013, she was a finalist for the Astounding Award for Best New Writer.

Cho's debut novel, Sorcerer to the Crown, was published in 2015 by Ace Books. The book is the first of a series of historical fantasy novels. It won the 2016 British Fantasy Award for Best Newcomer. It was a finalist for the 2016 Locus Award for Best First Novel. The novel's sequel, The True Queen, was published by Ace Books in 2019. The series was listed as "One of NPR’s 50 Favorite Sci-Fi and Fantasy Books of the Past Decade".

Her novelette "If at First You Don't Succeed, Try, Try Again", published by the Barnes & Noble Sci-Fi and Fantasy Blog, won the 2019 Hugo Award for Best Novelette.

Spirits Abroad: Stories, expanded edition, was published in August 2021 by Small Beer Press. The collection contains nine additional stories, including novelettes “The Terracotta Bride” and “If at First You Don’t Succeed, Try, Try Again”. It was a finalist for the 2022 Locus Award. The book was awarded the 2021 Ray Bradbury Prize by the Los Angeles Times Book Prize.

== Personal life ==
Cho lives with her family in Birmingham, United Kingdom, where she works as a lawyer.

== Awards ==
Year	Title	Award	Category	Result	Ref
2013	—	Astounding Award for Best New Writer	—	Finalist	
2015	Spirits Abroad	Crawford Award	—	Won (Note: Tie with The Angel of Losses by Stephanie Feldman)	
2015	Sorcerer to the Crown	Otherwise Award (Note: Then known as the James Tiptree Jr. Award)	—	Longlisted	
2016	Sorcerer to the Crown	British Fantasy Award	Newcomer	Won	
2016	Sorcerer to the Crown	British Fantasy Award	Fantasy Novel	Shortlisted	
2016	Sorcerer to the Crown	Locus Award	First Novel	Finalist	
2019	"If at First You Don't Succeed, Try, Try Again"	Hugo Award	Novelette	Won	
2021	The Order of the Pure Moon Reflected in Water	British Fantasy Award	Novella	Shortlisted	
2021	The Order of the Pure Moon Reflected in Water	Lambda Literary Award	Sci-fi, Fantasy, and Horror	Finalist	
2021	The Order of the Pure Moon Reflected in Water	Locus Award	Novella	Finalist	
2021	Spirits Abroad: Stories	Los Angeles Times Book Prize	Ray Bradbury Prize	Won	
2021	Black Water Sister	Kitschies	Red Tentacle (Novel)	Finalist	
2022	Black Water Sister	Ignyte Award	Adult Novel	Finalist	
2022	Black Water Sister	Locus Award	Fantasy Novel	Finalist	
2022	Black Water Sister	RUSA CODES Reading List	Fantasy	Shortlisted	
2022	Black Water Sister	World Fantasy Award	Novel	Nominated	
2022	Spirits Abroad: Stories	Locus Award	Collection	Finalist	

== Bibliography ==
=== Sorcerer Royal series ===
- —— (2015). Sorcerer to the Crown (hardcover 1st ed.). Ace. p. 371. ISBN 9780425283370.
- —— (2019). The True Queen (paperback 1st ed.). Ace. p. 371. ISBN 9780425283417.

=== Standalone novels and long fiction ===
- —— (2012). The Perilous Life of Jade Yeo (ebook ed.). Smashwords. p. 81. ISBN 9781476177670.
- —— (2020). The Order of the Pure Moon Reflected in Water (hardcover 1st ed.). Tor. p. 160. ISBN 9781250269256.
- —— (2021). Black Water Sister (paperback 1st ed.). Ace. p. 384. ISBN 9780425283431.

=== Collections ===
- —— (2014). Spirits Abroad (paperback 1st ed.). FIXI Novo. p. 284. ISBN 9789670374987.
  - —— (2021). Spirits Abroad (paperback expanded ed.). Small Beer Press. p. 338. ISBN 9781618731869.
