= The Legacy of Molly Southbourne =

2022 horror novella by Tade Thompson

- Author: Tade Thompson
- Language: English
- Series: Molly Southbourne
- Release number: 3
- Genre: Horror
- Publisher: Tordotcom
- Publication place: United Kingdom
- Pages: 160 (paperback)
- ISBN: 978-1-250-82470-7
- Preceded by: The Survival of Molly Southbourne

The Legacy of Molly Southbourne is a 2022 horror novella by Tade Thompson. It is a sequel to 2019's The Survival of Molly Southbourne. The novel received a special citation at the 2023 Philip K. Dick Awards.

== Plot ==
A feral molly (a blood clone, the result of a series of experiments gone wrong) kills several civilians. A British agent named Gove assigns a woman named Myke to track down the molly and kill it. Tamara meets Vitali. He offers to pay her to retrieve a molly and help smuggle it out of the UK.

Molly is living in Dorset under the name Molly Whitlow. She and her “sisters” Mollyann, Moya, and Molina undergo intensive therapy, but still struggle with their memories of violence, torture, and fire damage.

Myke breaks into a morgue full of dead mollies and tamaras. She burns the building to the ground, stealing some molly spleens in the process. She learns that there are at least two feral mollies. She kills them, revealing that she is Mykhaila Southbourne, mother of the original Molly. Myke contacts Vitali, who plans to use the molly spleens to repair a global fertility crisis. In a flashback, Mykhaila is revealed to be a British defector to the USSR. Secret operatives including Vitali injected her with a mysterious substance, allowing her to make duplicates. Disappointingly, the duplicates were all violent. Mykhaila returned to the UK, where she met her husband Connor and gave birth to Molly. After Connor was killed by a molly, Mykhaila used one of her own duplicates to fake her death. Mykhaila now wishes to kill all the remaining mollies as revenge for the death of Connor and her original daughter.

Molly and her sisters are attacked by a feral molly. They catch it and tie it up, hoping that it will eventually stop being violent and that they can integrate it into their family. They name this molly Kathy. Tamara approaches the house where Molly lives. She offers to double-cross Vitali. Molly is attacked by several feral mollies. Myke arrives. She kills Molina before Molly kills her.

A year later, Vitali has been arrested and the stolen genetic material has been recovered. Scientists have been able to perfect the duplication process. Molly declines an offer to work for Gove and wonders if she should write a book about her experiences.

== Reception and awards ==
Kristi Chadwick of Library Journal gave the novella a starred review, praised the characterization of Molly's clones as well as the plot, writing that "themes of redemption and found family sliding the last puzzle pieces into place in this exciting and haunting series." Publishers Weekly wrote that "the novel’s alternating perspectives can be disorienting" but "the action scenes are hard-hitting and adrenaline-stimulating, and serve as the most powerful and immersive parts of the novel."

The Legacy of Molly Southbourne received a special citation at the 2023 Philip K. Dick Awards.
