= Alma Alexander =

American novelist (born 1963)

Alma A. Hromic
- Born: Alma A. Hromic; July 5, 1963 (age 63); Novi Sad
- Occupation: Novelist
- Writing career
- Pen name: Alma Alexander
- Genre: Fantasy
- Notable work: The Secrets of Jin-Shei
- Website: www.almaalexander.org

Alma A. Hromic (born July 5, 1963), known by her pen name Alma Alexander, is a fantasy writer whose novels include the "Worldweavers" young adult series, The Secrets of Jin-Shei and its sequel The Embers of Heaven, The Hidden Queen, and Changer of Days. She was born in Yugoslavia and grew up in various African countries, including Zambia, Eswatini, and South Africa, also spending time in England and New Zealand before moving to the United States. She lives in Bellingham, Washington.

In addition to her fantasy novels, Alexander has published a memoir about growing up in Africa and an epistolary novel (written with her husband, then an acquaintance from a Usenet newsgroup) about the NATO war in Yugoslavia. She has also published numerous book reviews, travelogues, essays, poetry, and other articles in various magazines (e.g., Swans) around the world. Her story "The Painting" won the 2000 BBC Short Story Contest.

In 2009, Alexander donated her archive to the department of Rare Books and Special Collections at Northern Illinois University.

== Bibliography ==
- Houses in Africa, David Ling Publishers (New Zealand), 1995 (as Alma A. Hromic)
- The Dolphin's Daughter and Other Stories, Longman (UK), 1995 (as Alma A. Hromic)
- Letters from the Fire (with R. A. Deckert), HarperCollins (NZ), 1999 (as Alma A. Hromic)
- Changer of Days Vol. 1, Voyager (Australia/NZ), 2001 (as Alma A. Hromic)
- Changer of Days Vol. 2, Voyager (Australia/NZ), 2002 (as Alma A. Hromic)
- The Secrets of Jin-Shei, HarperCollins, 2004 ISBN 0-00-716375-4 (also published in several other countries and languages)
- The Hidden Queen, Eos, 2004 (US edition of Changer of Days Vol. 1)
- Changer of Days, Eos, 2004 (US edition of Changer of Days Vol. 2)
- The Embers of Heaven, HarperCollins (UK), 2006 (also published in Australia/NZ)
- Gift of the Unmage (Worldweavers #1), Eos, 2007 ISBN 0-06-083955-4
- Spellspam (Worldweavers #2), Eos, 2008 ISBN 0-06-083958-9
- Cybermage (Worldweavers #3), Harperteen, 2009 ISBN 0-06-083961-9
- Shoes & Ships & Sealing Wax, Kos Books, 2010
- Midnight at Spanish Gardens, Sky Warrior Books, 2011
- River, Dark Quest Books, 2012 (editor)
- Random, Book 1 in The Were Chronicles, Dark Quest BOoks, 2014
- Dawn of Magic (Worldweavers #4), Sky Warrior Books, 2015
- AbductiCon, Book View Cafe, 2015
- Empress, Book View Cafe, 2015
- Children of a Different Sky, Kos Books, 2017 (editor)
- Wings of Magic, Book View Cafe 2017
