= Simon Bestwick =

British horror writer

Simon Bestwick (born 1974) is an English author of British contemporary horror.

== Biography ==
Bestwick attended the University of Salford which he graduated from in 1996 with a 2:1 degree in Media and Performance.

Writer Ramsey Campbell has described Bestwick, along with Gary McMahon, Alison Littlewood and Joel Lane, as part of a class of contemporary British writers developing a “consciously political form of horror fiction, using the genre to examine and symbolise Thatcher’s Britain and the country’s subsequent decades”.

His short stories have been reprinted in Best Horror of the Year #1 'The Narrows', Best Horror of the Year #4 'Dermot' and 'The Moraine', Best British Fantasy 2013 'Dermot', and his short story ‘Below’ is due to be reprinted in Best Horror of the Year # 12 (September 2020).

== Awards and honours ==
- 2009 – British Fantasy Award nomination for best novella for “The Narrows”
- 2012 – British Fantasy Award nomination for best short story for “Dermot”
- 2019 – British Fantasy Award nomination for best horror novel for “Wolf's Hill”
- 2019 – British Fantasy Award nomination for best novella for “Breakwater”

== Selected works ==
=== Books ===
- Power of the Dog: Precinct 13 Publications, 1998.
- Tide of Souls: Abaddon Books, 2009. ISBN 978-1906735142
- The Faceless: Solaris, 2012. ISBN 978-1907992742
- Let's Drink to the Dead: Solaris, 2012. ASIN B00AIM7PTE
- The Condemned: Gray Friar Press, 2013. ISBN 978-1906331412
- Hell's Ditch: Snowbooks, 2015. ISBN 978-1909679696
- Devil's Highway: Snowbooks, 2016. ISBN 978-1909679900
- The Feast of All Souls: Solaris, 2016. ISBN 978-1781084618
- Angels of the Silences: Omnium Gatherum Media, 2016. ISBN 978-0692619384
- Wolf's Hill: Snowbooks, 2018. ISBN 978-1911390503
- Breakwater: Tor, 2018. ASIN B079Y41MRR

=== Collections ===
- A Hazy Shade of Winter: Ash-Tree Press, 2004. ASIN B006WBJ4IK
- Pictures of the Dark: Gray Friar Press, 2009. ISBN 978-1906331085
- And Cannot Come Again: Tales of Childhood, Regret, and Innocence Lost: ChiZine, 2019. ISBN 978-1771485227 (Out of Print), and reprinted by Horrific Tales, 2020. ISBN 978-1910283264

=== As editor ===
- Oktobyr '98:: Precinct 13 Publications, 1998.
