= Fireheart Tiger =

2021 novella by Aliette de Bodard

- Author: Aliette de Bodard
- Language: English
- Genre: Fantasy
- Published: 2021
- Publisher: Tordotcom
- Publication place: France
- Pages: 104
- ISBN: 1250793262
- OCLC: 1239333333

Fireheart Tiger is a 2021 fantasy novella by Aliette de Bodard. It won the 2021 BSFA Award for Shorter Fiction, and it was a finalist for several other literary awards.

== Plot ==
Princess Thanh of Bình Hải is sent as a hostage to the court of Ephteria, a larger and more powerful nation. A fire destroys the palace in Yosolis, the capital. Thanh survives with the aid of servant Giang. Giang disappears after the fire. Thanh and Princess Eldris of Ephteria briefly become lovers before Thanh is sent home.

In the following years, Ephteria’s power grows and Bình Hải’s position weakens. Meanwhile, small fires repeatedly break out near Thanh; she hides these incidents from her mother, the Empress. Princess Eldris arrives with a delegation of Ephterians. They seek trade rights and concessions which could make Bình Hải a vassal state. During a break in negotiations, Eldris and Thanh make love in the palace garden.

That night, Giang reappears in Thanh’s room, revealing that she is a fire elemental. Giang had been imprisoned in a tiger statuette within the palace in Yosolis; the burning of the palace was an accident that occurred during Giang’s escape.

An Ephterian official blackmails Thanh, threatening to reveal her romantic interest in Eldris to Thanh's mother. Thanh lies to Giang, hoping to keep her relationship with Eldris private. Eldris proposes marriage to Thanh, which would prevent Ephteria from taking control of Bình Hải. Thanh accepts. The Empress is initially angry but comes to accept that a political marriage is in the best interest of Bình Hải. Thanh reveals the betrothal to Giang, who disapproves. Giang states that Eldris would have let Thanh die in the palace fire. Thanh angrily sends Giang away.

Eldris arrives in Thanh’s room, accusing her of concealing a lover in her room. Eldris attempts to strike Thanh, who flees. Giang reappears, protecting Thanh. Eldris ends the engagement and leaves. Giang chases Eldris, taking the form of a flaming tiger and starting a series of fires. Thanh calms Giang, and the Ephterians leave Bình Hải.

Thanh bargains with other nations to strengthen Bình Hải. She considers a romance with Giang while contemplating the future of her nation.

== Themes ==
Science fiction critic Gary K. Wolfe stated that the book "more directly addresses complex questions of colonialism and the fraught negotiations needed to keep an independent nation from being overwhelmed by more powerful neighbors." Other reviewers noted the presence of themes such as power dynamics in personal relationships, as well as female and queer representation.

In an interview, de Bordard stated that the book was inspired by the tradition of Vietnamese and Chinese court dramas. In an other interview, she stated that:

Fireheart Tiger is a romantic sapphic fantasy, but first and foremost I wanted to write about a character who learns to break free from abusive relationships, and I wanted to have that plot line set side by side with a larger mirroring one about colonisation and unequal relationships, as exemplified by Thanh’s own country of Bình Hải and their relationship with the much more powerful Ephteria. I’m not saying colonisation is abuse (it’s a little more complicated than that, and I don’t want to diminish either by equating them), but I’m deliberately setting up thematic parallels in the micro and macro narrative.

== Reception ==
Writing for Locus magazine, Liz Bourke described the book as "gorgeous and moving, with a sense of scale and an intimate, personal engagement with compelling characters," and added that it "is a worthy addition to de Bodard’s body of work." For Tor.com, Maya Gittelman stated that it was "a lush, sharp, and evocative novella. It’s a quick read that brims with aching beauty, intricate emotion, and surprising twists of magic."

The Mary Sue listed the book as one of its 15 most anticipated diverse SFF releases for 2021.

=== Accolades ===
Year	Award	Category	Result	Ref.
2021	Nebula Award	Best Novella	Nominated	
2021	BSFA Award	Short Fiction	Won	
2022	Locus Award	Novella	Finalist	
2022	Hugo Award	Novella	Finalist	
2022	Ignyte Award	Novella	Finalist	
