= The Red Scholar's Wake =

2022 novel by Aliette de Bodard

- Author: Aliette de Bodard
- Cover artist: Alyssa Winans
- Language: English
- Series: Xuya Universe
- Genre: Space opera; romance novel
- Published: 24 Nov 2022
- Publication place: United States
- Pages: 336 (hardcover)
- ISBN: 978-1399601368

The Red Scholar's Wake is a 2022 novel by Aliette de Bodard. It is set in her Xuya Universe, a universe shared by several of the author's other works.

== Plot ==
The Dai Viet Empire supports a fleet of pirates against their imperial rival, the An O Empire. The pirate fleet is divided into five banners known by their colors, with each led by a Scholar. Xích Si, a citizen of the An O Empire, is a scavenger and bot expert. She is captured by Rice Fish, a sentient spaceship. Rice Fish’s wife, the Red Scholar Huan, has recently died in an ambush led by Censor Trúc, an An O government official.

Rice Fish proposes a marriage of convenience to Xích Si. Rice Fish will protect Xích Si and prevent her from being sold into indentured servitude. Meanwhile, Xích Si will investigate the possibility that a traitor within the pirate fleet gave access codes to Censor Trúc, resulting in Huan’s death. Xích Si accepts. As a condition of this, she will not be able to return to An O space or see her six-year-old daughter, Khanh.

Rice Fish suspects that the Green Scholar Kim Thông is behind Huan’s death. She navigates a turbulent relationship with the other banners. This includes the Purple Scholar, Hô, who is Huan’s estranged son. Although their marriage began as a political agreement, Xích Si and Rice Fish gradually fall in love. Xích Si learns that Khanh is going to be sold into indentured servitude. She takes a ship back into An O space, risking the death penalty for piracy. She is almost arrested by Trúc, who lets her go on the promise of a future favor. Xích Si does not inform Rice Fish of the debt to the Censor.

Xích Si uncovers proof that the Green Scholar betrayed Huan. Rice Fish confronts Kim Thông. Hô reveals Xích Si’s unauthorized communication and debt to the Censor. Rice Fish is voted out of the pirate counsel.

Trúc offers Xích Si amnesty in exchange for betraying the pirate citadel. Xích Si refuses. The Censor’s fleet heads toward the citadel. Rice Fish leaves to gather evidence about the fleet. She is damaged by a bomb planted on her by Kim Thông. Hô and Xích Si board the Censor’s ship. After a tense standoff, the Censor surrenders. In return, Xích Si agrees that the pirate fleet with stop raiding and serve as bodyguards for merchant ships.

Rice Fish, though badly damaged, kills Kim Thông in a surprise attack. Rice Fish is elected to be the Red Scholar to replace Huan. Hô refuses to disavow piracy; the Purple Banner separates from the remainder of the fleet. Rice Fish and Xích Si reconcile and plan a future together with Khanh.

== Background ==
James Davis Nicoll of Reactor wrote that the characters are inspired by the historical pirate queen Ching Shih and the pirates of the South China Sea.

== Reception ==
Michael Dodd of the British Fantasy Society noted that the novel is a good point of entry into the author's Xuya universe, calling it "recognisably a space opera but one that’s concerned less with technological explanations or detailed histories and more with character dynamics, relationships and compelling cultural observations." Dodd praised the "believable" romance between the leads, despite their differences in physicality and power dynamics.

Dev Agarwal of the British Science Fiction Association wrote that the novel "delivers on the struggle of humanity in the face of the near-infinite [but] it does not neglect the intimacy of the inner lives of its female protagonists." Agarwal further notes that the novel pays homage to several other classic science fiction works, such as the 1996 novel Idoru by William Gibson, which also features a human-AI marriage. The review notes that the differences between Idoru and The Red Scholar's Wake show the evolution of the genre throughout the previous three decades. First, the earlier novel featured a marriage between secondary characters, while de Bodard chooses to make the human-AI pair her protagonists. Secondly, de Bodard chose to make her couple a same-sex pair. The review concludes by recommending the novel, calling it "a love story and a frank and honest exploration of trauma and loss."

Gary K Wolfe of Locus praised the novel's characterization, stating that Rice Fish fulfills a trope shared by most fictional pirates: "she occupies that ambiguous moral ground between being a violent predator on the one hand, and on the other a liberator whose victims are mostly unsavory capitalists and imperialists." Wolfe also praised the plotting of the novel, writing that the final act, "with its space battles, navigational trickery, ship-boardings, sabotage, and desperate last-minute negotiations, is as colorful and satisfying as anything from the classic examples of the form." Fabienne Schwizer of Grimdark Magazine praised the novel, particularly the age of the protagonists. Schwizer's review states that the "characters’ maturity makes them stand out in a market saturated with coming-of-age stories across young adult and adult publishing, and it is a true breath of fresh air to read about protagonists coming into their story after a life well-lived, with attachments and history, knowing who they are and what they want."

Year	Award	Result	Ref.
2022	BSFA Award for Best Novel	Shortlisted	
2022	BSFA Award for Best Artwork	Won	
2023	Arthur C. Clarke Award	Shortlisted	
2023	Locus Award for Best Science Fiction Novel	Finalist-4th	
