= Seven of Infinities =

2020 novella by Aliette de Bodard

- Author: Aliette de Bodard
- Audio read by: Emily Woo Zeller
- Language: English
- Series: Xuya Universe
- Genre: Science fiction
- Published: 31 Oct 2020
- Pages: 174 (paperback)
- ISBN: 9781625675330

Seven of Infinities is a 2020 novella by Aliette de Bodard, set in her Xuya Universe. The book was a finalist for the 2021 Locus Award for Best Novella.

== Plot ==
Vân is a scholar from a lower-class background. She tutors a young woman, Uyên, in preparation for the imperial examinations. A mysterious visitor to Uyên's apartment arrives and dies shortly thereafter. Vân and her companion, the mindship Wild Orchid in the Sunless Woods, investigate.

Both Vân and Sunless Woods are hiding secrets. Vân and her friends, sisters Hương Dinh and Hương Lâm, were once involved with anti-government activities. Dinh and Lâm were arrested; Vân believes them dead. Years later, Vân became a scholar. Many scholars use mem-implants, which are AI personalities based on the bearer's ancestors. Lacking educated ancestors, Vân manufactured an implant from scratch. While technically legal, this is socially unacceptable. Vân hides the origin her implant, fearing that she will lose her job if the truth is discovered. Meanwhile, Sunless Woods poses as a respectable member of society, but is actually a retired thief. Sunless Woods has grown bored with the scholar's life, pining for the excitement of her criminal past.

Vân and Sunless Woods discover that Uyên's apartment was designed by an architect who hid secret compartments within the buildings that she designed. Inside a hidden safe, Vân finds a piece of a dead mindship, The Elephant in Grass, and a mạt chược tile. Vân travels to the wreck of The Elephant in Grass, where she finds another corpse.

Through further investigation, Vân learns that the corpse in Uyên's apartment was Hương Dinh. After their criminal conviction, the Hương sisters were given "exile implants." These implants trigger upon the return to a forbidden area, eventually resulting in death. The mạt chược tile was the Seven of Infinities. Vân and the Hương sisters once used the tiles entitled "Seven of Threads", "Seven of Barrels", and "Seven of Infinities" to refer to themselves. During this time, Sunless Woods and Lân develop an attraction to each other and have sex.

Hương Lâm contacts Vân and asks to meet. She poisons Vân and attempts to steal her mem-implant; the technology to create a forged implant would be invaluable on the black market. Having lost her sister and failing to obtain any valuables from the architect's home or The Elephant in Grass, Lâm seeks the mem-implant as a consolation prize. Sunless Woods reveals her background as a thief during an attempt to bargain for Vân's safety. Uyên arrives and shames Hương Lâm for her lack of filial piety towards her dead sister Dinh. Hương Lâm releases Vân and leaves the station. Their secrets revealed, Vân and Sunless Woods forgive each other.

== Reception and awards ==
Gary K. Wolfe of Locus wrote that despite its science fiction trappings, "the events of the tale wouldn’t be much out of place in a classical whodunit." Wolfe praised the novel for its "seamless weaving together of three wildly diverse frames of reference: the structure of a romantic mystery, the far-future space opera-like setting, and the culture of formality and tradition derived from its Vietnamese and Chinese ancestry..." Also writing for Locus, Liz Bourke noted that "De Bodard’s work is marked by precision and delicacy of prose, by a concern with ethics and relationships, and by the presence of uncaring systems that violently resist critique from without – and even from within." Bourke also praised the novel's romantic subplot, noting that "de Bodard’s envisioning of a relationship between human and shipmind casts open the question of bodies, of intimacy, of the nature of sex and romance: what it means to be human. It is a very queer relationship, in that it demands a broadening of normative ideas of what sexual intimacy is and who gets to engage in it."

A review in Publishers Weekly called the novel "lush, immersive ... a world as gritty as it is ethereal." The review felt that the worldbuilding was a weak aspect of the novel, stating that the author "hints at a vast, fully realized world, but offers too few explanations for some of her imaginative creations." In spite of this critique, the review felt that "readers will be swept away by the vivid prose, intrigue, and romance of this intricate tale." In a more negative review, Nhu Le of DVAN wrote that the novella did not meet the criteria of either a successful romance or a successful mystery. According to the review, "As a romance, its pairing is conceptually interesting but not emotionally convincing; and as a mystery, its shocking and exciting opener peters out into a predictable and logically-questionable conclusion." The review praised the worldbuiling as the best aspect of the story, stating "In such a short work, she succeeds not only in communicating the large-scale technological and societal differences on which the plot hinges, but also the finer societal details that bring the setting to life." The reviewer concluded by recommending that readers enjoy other books set in the Xuya Universe, stating that Seven of Infinities was a weak entry into the series.

Award nominations
Year	Award	Result	Ref
2021	Locus Award for Best Novella	Finalist	
