= Navigational Entanglements =

2024 science fiction novella by Aliette de Bodard

- Author: Aliette de Bodard
- Language: English
- Genre: Science fiction
- Publisher: Tordotcom
- Publication date: 30 Jul 2024
- Publication place: United States
- Pages: 176 (Hardcover)
- ISBN: 9781250324887

Navigational Entanglements is a 2024 science fiction novella by Aliette de Bodard. It tells the story of a group of misfit apprentices who are ordered to track down a dangerous interdimensional creature. The novella received critical claim; it was a finalist for the BSFA Award for Shorter Fiction, the Hugo Award for Best Novella, and the Locus Award for Best Novella.

== Plot ==
The four major Navigator clans are Rooster, Rat, Ox, and Snake. They maintain a level of independence from the Empire that otherwise rules their region of space. Navigators have the power to guide ships through the Hollows, an extradimensional realm that allows faster-than-light travel. They use their own life energy, or Shadow, to open gates into the Hollows. The Hollows are populated by dangerous creatures called Tanglers, which resemble jellyfish.

A Tangler escapes the Hollows. Ly Châu, a member of the Dog clan and a servant of the Empire, leads a team to investigate. The team members include Việt Nhi of the Rooster clan, an introvert with poor interpersonal skills; Hạc Cúc of the Snake clan, an assassin; Bảo Duy of the Rat clan, a scientist; and Lành of the Ox clan, a survivor of a Tangler attack.

Ly Châu is killed by poison. The team finds the corpses of two people who were killed by the Tangler. Bảo Duy discovers that the Tangler about to reproduce, increasing the danger. The junior Navigators fight about next steps; personality clashes endanger the future of their mission.

Bảo Duy leaves to investigate the Tangler. When Nhi notices that she has gone missing, she convinces the other apprentices to put aside their disagreements and follow. The juniors save Bảo Duy and trap the Tangler in a barrier. During the confrontation, Lành is also snared by the Tangler; Hạc Cúc rescues her. Clan elders arrive, promising to deal with the adult Tangler if the juniors handle its seeds.

Nhi and Hạc Cúc have sex. Later, Hạc Cúc accuses Lành of being a Tangler sympathizer. The two fight; a horrified Nhi walks in on the aftermath.

The Tangler escapes from the barrier which the junior Navigators had placed. Nhi hypothesizes that their own clan elders killed Ly Châu and set the apprentices up to fail. When the apprentices succeeded against all odds, the clan elders released the Tangler.

Nhi confronts her own elder, who confesses the truth. The elders fear that the Dog clan and the Empire will soon strip the Navigators of their monopoly on travel through the Hollows. In order to convince the populace that Navigators are needed to protect them, the elders planned to release the Tanger into a major population. They would then rescue the survivors, increasing public support for the clans.

Nhi wants to defy the elders. She confesses her love to Hạc Cúc, hoping to convince the assassin agree. Hạc Cúc leaves. Nhi attacks and subdues her own elder, promising to save the Dog clan by herself. Meanwhile, Hạc Cúc considers Nhi's plan and changes her mind. She convinces the other apprentices to join Nhi. They find that Nhi has already left and pursue her to the Dog Needle, which is about to be attacked. The three juniors rescue Nhi from the Tangler. Nhi opens a gate to the Hollows, and the Tangler returns to its native habitat. Hạc Cúc rescues Nhi before she is sucked into the Hollows.

Hạc Cúc apologizes for leaving Nhi earlier; they kiss. The four apprentices, no longer welcome in the clans, leave in their ship together.

== Reception and awards ==
Publishers Weekly gave the novella a starred review, calling the book "simultaneously electric and heartwarming." The review praised the twisting plot and the well-developed relationships between characters, concluding that it would be enjoyed by both fans and new readers of the author's works.

Liz Bourke of Locus found the book fast-paced and tense, calling the Tangler "legitimately unnerving." Bourke noted that it explores themes found in many of the author's other works: it examines "moral courage" in the face of authority figures who fail to protect their charges. Like many of the author's other works, it also features characters who outsiders, "who have or who feel themselves to have a marginal position with regard to their societies, whose sense of safety and belonging has always been contingent." Bourke loved the novella, hoping for similar works from de Bodard in the future.

Judith Tarr of Reactor praised the alien biology of the Tanglers, which are based on terrestrial jellyfish. Tarr commented that jellyfish are profoundly different from humans, making them ideal candidates for the basis of a fictional alien life form. The review also commented on the appropriate title, which refers both to the Tanglers' stingers and the emotional entanglements that ensnare the four young navigators.

Kirkus Reviews called the book "quirky", finding it to be a mix of "xianxia-style Chinese fantasy" and a novel of manners. The review commented on the interpersonal relationships of the characters, stating that Nhi is the "glue for this group and this story." The review concluded that the novella deserved more pages.

Year	Award	Category	Result	Ref.
2024	BSFA Award	Shorter Fiction	Finalist	
2025	Hugo Award	Novella	Finalist	
2025	Locus Award	Novella	Finalist	
