= Rosewater (Thompson novel) =

2016 science fiction novel by Tade Thompson

- First edition cover art as published by Apex Publications in 2016
- Author: Tade Thompson
- Language: English
- Series: The Wormwood Trilogy #1
- Genre: Science fiction
- Set in: Nigeria, 2012–2066
- Publisher: Apex Publications; Orbit Books
- Publication date: 2016 (Apex); 18 September 2018 (Orbit)
- Publication place: United Kingdom
- Pages: 423 pp
- Awards: Arthur C. Clarke Award (2019)
- ISBN: 9780316449052
- Followed by: The Rosewater Insurrection

Rosewater is a 2016 science fiction novel by Nigerian British writer Tade Thompson. It was followed by two sequels: The Rosewater Insurrection and The Rosewater Redemption which were published in 2019 simultaneously. The novel won the inaugural Nommo Award as well as the 2019 Arthur C. Clarke Award.

== Plot ==
Nigerian agent Kaaro uses his psychic powers to investigate a mysterious alien dome and deaths linked to it.

In 2012, an alien named Wormwood appears in London, substantially altering the world's geopolitical landscape. In the 2050s, it creates an impenetrable dome in Rosewater, Nigeria. It exudes a fungus called xenoforms, which interact with human nervous systems. A very small number of humans are able to use the xenoforms to access an information network known as the xenosphere; these humans are called “sensitives”. The life of Kaaro, a sensitive, is presented throughout different decades.

As a teen, Kaaro uses his burgeoning psychic abilities for thievery. He is caught and almost executed. He escapes and begins using his telepathy on the black market before being recruited by the government. In the 2050s, he trains with S45, a secret branch of the Nigerian government. He is tasked with tracking down Oyin Da, an anarchist revolutionary. Kaaro and Da travel to the future site of Rosewater, where they speak with Wormwood. They are followed by S45 agents who shoot at Wormwood, but Kaaro senses the trap and saves him. Wormwood then creates the dome to separate himself from most humans; Da stays within the dome and Kaaro does not.

In 2066, Kaaro is still working for S45. Sensitives begin dying of an unknown illness. He begins seeing a mysterious woman named Molara in the xenosphere. He dates a woman named Aminat. Unbeknownst to Kaaro, she is an undercover S45 agent. Molara reveals that she is of alien origin; she is the embodiment of the xenosphere. The creation of sensitives was an unintended consequence as aliens gathered information about Earth. They no longer need more information, so they are killing the sensitives. She attempts to kill Kaaro, but he is rescued by Wormwood. Kaaro learns that the aliens are replacing human DNA with their own over the course of generations. He and Aminat continue their lives, unsure about how to combat the inevitable end of humanity.

== Major themes ==
After Wormwood lands in London, the United States goes dark and becomes isolated from the world. In contrast, Nigeria becomes the center of the story. This contrasts with the history of science fiction, a genre long dominated by Americans, and mirrors the emergence of more science fiction writers of African descent. The novel also critiques the isolationist policies of American president Donald Trump.

The novel features important discussions about human connection. This is shown by the presence of sensitives and their ability to access the xenosphere, which parallels the inability of many modern people to disconnect from the Internet and social media. In contrast to white western cyberpunk, Rosewater's characters are connected by networks of family and friendship groups. Homosexuality is still illegal in 2060s Nigeria; Kaaro's gay foster parents are forced to disable their tracking signals despite the presence of an all-connecting xenosphere. Furthermore, the alien invasion trope is used to explore "global power structures and pervasive technologies".

== Publication history ==
The novel was first published by the small press Apex Publications before being acquired by Orbit Books.

== Reception ==
The novel received critical praise. It has been described as a genre mashup, including Africanfuturism, cyberpunk, biopunk, Afropunk, zombie-shocker, a love story; a reviewer for The Guardian praised Thompson's ability to "expertly [juggle] all his disparate elements". Another reviewer called it "a worthy winner" of the Arthur C. Clarke Award and stated that Thompson was one of the "leading proponents of contemporary Afrofuturism" along with authors such as N. K. Jemisin and Colson Whitehead. The novel was praised for including various references to Yoruba culture. A reviewer for Locus wrote that it "represent[s] yet another major contribution to the small but growing number of SF works reflecting Nigerian culture." Another praised the "evocative descriptions" as well as the physicality of the writing style. Thompson also received praise for his strong female characters.

Awards and honors
Year	Work	Award	Category	Result	Ref.
2017	Rosewater	Campbell Memorial Award	—	Finalist	
2017	Rosewater	Nommo Award	Novel	Won	
2018	Rosewater	BSFA Award	Novel	Shortlisted	
2019	Rosewater	Arthur C. Clarke Award	—	Won	
2020	The Wormwood Trilogy	Hugo Award	Series	Finalist	
