= The Citadel of Weeping Pearls =

2015 science fiction novella by Aliette de Bodard

- Author: Aliette de Bodard
- Cover artist: Maurizio Manzieri
- Language: English
- Series: Xuya Universe
- Genre: Science fiction
- Publisher: Asimov's Science Fiction; JABberwocky
- English publication date: 2015
- ISBN: 9781625672551

The Citadel of Weeping Pearls is a 2015 science fiction novella by Aliette de Bodard. It is set in her Xuya Universe. The work was a finalist for the 2016 Locus Award for Best Novella.

== Plot ==
The Citadel of Weeping Pearls was a space station led by Bright Princess Ngoc Minh, eldest daughter of Dai Viet Empress Mi Hiep. The Citadel was a repository of advanced technology and weaponry. Minh enraged her mother by taking a commoner as her wife rather than a noble. Minh also refused to share the Citadel’s technology, so the empress ordered the station to be destroyed. When the Dai Viet soldiers arrived, they found that the Citadel had vanished. Thirty years later, the Dai Viet Empire is under attack from the Nam Federation, and the empress believes that weapons from the lost Citadel can help in the fight.

The Turtle’s Golden Claw is a mindship. Before the Claw’s brain was implanted into the machinery of the ship, she was the human granddaughter of the Empress. Grand Master Bach Cuc, the Claw’s paternal grandmother and a scientist searching for the Citadel, goes missing. Bach Cuc was researching deep spaces, an alternate dimension allowing faster-than-light travel and where time flows differently than normal space. She hoped to use deep spaces to find the Citadel.

Suu Nuoc is one of the empress’s former lovers and an investigator. The empress orders Nuoc and her daughter Ngoc Ha to interrogate the merchant who last saw Bach Cuc. They travel aboard the Claw to the orbital where the merchant lives; along the way, they learn that Bach Cuc was most likely killed by her own experiment.

The merchant’s daughter Lum is a scientist working with Diem Huong. Diem Huong’s mother disappeared with the Citadel. Huong and Lum have worked to build a time machine to discover the truth of what happened. Huong uses the machine to observe the Citadel, although she cannot change the past. She learns that her mother knew of the Citadel’s impending disappearance and sent Diem Huong away to spare her.

Nuoc and Ha find the time machine. Ha enters the machine to search for her sister Minh; she rescues Huong and they return to the present. They also see a vision of Minh. Minh reveals that she caused the Citadel to disappear in order to avoid fighting her mother. Minh has traveled so far into deep spaces that she has become something other than human, neither alive nor dead. Ha follows her sister into the deep spaces and disappears. Suu Ngoc promises to return to the empress and explain the events that he witnessed.

== Background ==
The Citadel of Weeping Pearls is loosely inspired by the Vietnamese folk tale known as "The One-Night Lake" or "The Marsh Boy." Chang relates the tale of Princess Tiên Dung and sage Chử Đồng Tử as follows:

The couple’s love story forms the basis of an annual springtime festival in northern Vietnam, which also acts as a local equivalent of Valentine’s Day (Thong). Tiên Dung was a beautiful, whimsical princess beloved by the king, and she fell in love with Chử, who was then a poor mortal fisherman, and married him. This incurred the king’s wrath, and the couple were banished. While travelling, the couple experienced a series of magical adventures that resulted in their ownership of a grand palace, and people who travelled there to pledge allegiance to them. The king, believing his daughter had rebelled against him, leads an army to subjugate her. Tiên Dung and Chử refuse to fight him, and they ascend to the heavens with their palace and people, leaving behind a great marsh...

== Major themes ==
=== Relationship to Confucianism ===
In an article published in Science Fiction Studies, Zhui Ning Chang examined the relationship between Confucianism and The Citadel of Weeping Pearls, particularly in the novella's treatment of patriarchy and feminism. The article notes that the Xuya series is marketed with paratext describing its setting as "'Confucian' galactic empires of Chinese and Vietnamese inspiration". This is "of relatively limited applicability in the text". While The Citadel of Weeping Pearls mentions a Master Kong, possibly referencing the surname of Confucius, there are no other in-universe references to the original Chinese philosopher. Chang argues that the paratextual references to Confucius are a commercial branding ploy designed to appeal to Anglophone readers, who "a limited understanding of what Southeast Asia constitutes, both within and beyond the wider construct of Asia". Despite this marketing, Chang states that "The Citadel of Weeping Pearls genderbends traditionally masculine roles to critique the significance of the father-son lineage in Confucian patriarchy."

=== Parent-child relationships ===
Chang further commented on the ways in which the novella innovated upon the original folktale.

Besides relocating the Vietnamese folktale to outer space, Citadel co-opts masculine power (such as the absolute authority of the emperor) into a matriarchal lineage. This reversal of gender politics does not shift the inherent violence of imperialism, however, and instead only leads to intergenerational trauma from mother to daughter.

While the original folktale denies a resolution to the parent-child conflict, The Citadel of Weeping Pearls shifts the focus from filial piety into a hope for reconciliation. Per Chang, the transformation from a father-son to relationship to a mother-daughter relationship "offers a counter-narrative both to the Anglocentric publishing market’s expectations of an anthropological exotic as well as to patriarchal Confucian perspectives."

== Reception ==
Tadiana Jones gave the novella four out of five stars, praised the focus on interpersonal relationships. Jones called the work "slower-paced and somewhat opaque" but "also a beautifully written, bittersweet mystery in a wonderfully imaginative space setting."

Writing for Locus, Lois Tilton criticized the "insufficient narrative thrust." According to Tilton, "the key motivating event lies far in the past, and we can’t really understand it from the present point of view, can’t understand why the Empress would have made the drastic decision to destroy her own daughter or, indeed, why the daughter would have felt the need to flee her mother in the first place."

=== Awards ===
Year	Award	Result	Reference
2016	Locus Award for Best Novella	Finalist	
