= Kat Richardson =

American author (born 1964)

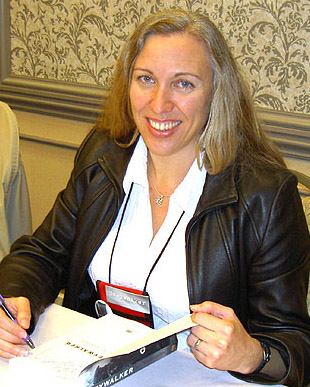
- Richardson signing her first book, Greywalker, at 2006 Bouchercon
- Born: Mary-Patricia Kathleen; May 22, 1964 (age 62); California, US
- Occupation: Novelist
- Writing career
- Period: 2006 to present
- Genre: Fantasy
- Website: katrichardson.com

Kat Richardson (born May 22, 1964) is an American author best known for her Greywalker urban fantasy series.

== Biography ==
In addition to the Greywalker series, Kat has published in other text forms and media, including role-playing games, video games, and comics as well as magazine writing, technical writing, and curriculum writing and editing. She is married and lives in Seattle, Washington, and is an advocate of California Ferret Legalization.

== Greywalker series ==
The Greywalker series consists of nine novels. In the ninth novel, Richardson states, "This is the last Greywalker novel, at least for a while." Harper Blaine, the heroine of the series, is a private investigator living in Seattle and was killed whilst pursuing a case. She was dead for only two minutes and brought back by medical intervention. During her recovery, she discovers she is able to recognize witches and vampires, see ghosts and is aware of other elements of the supernatural world. She discovers that her brief death has turned her into a Greywalker, a human able to move back and forth at will through the Grey, the realm that exists between our world and the next.

== Bibliography ==
=== Greywalker series ===
1. Greywalker (October 2006, ISBN 0-451-46107-X)
2. Poltergeist (August 2007, ISBN 0-451-46150-9)
3. Underground (August 2008, ISBN 0-451-46212-2)
4. Vanished (August 2009, ISBN 0-7499-4076-X)
5. Labyrinth (August 2010, ISBN 978-0-7499-4081-2)
6. Downpour (August 2011, ISBN 978-0-451-46398-2)
7. Seawitch (August 2012, ISBN 0-451-46455-9)
8. Possession (August 2013, ISBN 978-0-451-46512-2)
9. Revenant (August 2014, ISBN 978-0-698-14560-3)

== See also ==
- List of fantasy authors
