= On a Red Station, Drifting =

2012 science fiction novella by Aliette de Bodard

- First edition cover art
- Author: Aliette de Bodard
- Language: English
- Series: Xuya Universe
- Genre: Science fiction
- Publisher: Immersion Press
- Publication date: 24 December 2012
- Pages: 106 (Hardcover)
- ISBN: 9780956392459

On a Red Station, Drifting is a 2012 science fiction novella by Aliette de Bodard. Set in her Xuya Universe, it focuses on two women aboard a space station with a failing artificial intelligence. It received critical acclaim, becoming a finalist for the 2012 Nebula Award for Best Novella, the 2013 Hugo Award for Best Novella, and the 2013 Locus Award for Best Novella.

== Plot ==
Lê Thi Linh is a magistrate of the Dai Viet Empire who is forced to flee her planet after criticizing the Emperor’s wartime policies. At the same time, rebel groups seize control of her planet and kill most of her subordinates. Linh seeks refuge with her distant relatives on Prosper Station. Prosper is controlled by an artificial intelligence called the Honoured Ancestress. Lê Thi Quyen, Linh’s cousin by marriage, manages the day-to-day operations of Prosper while her husband is away at war. Quyen and Linh immediately fall into conflict.

Quyen’s brother-in-law Huu Hieu sells his mem-implants, which are copies of their ancestors’ consciousnesses. Meanwhile, the Honoured Ancestress experiences increasingly severe technical problems. Hieu and Linh become close. Hieu plans use the money from the sale of the implants to leave Prosper and marry his lover on a different station. Linh is upset knowing that she will never be able to leave. A visiting cousin, Lady Oahn, provides schematics for the repair of the Honoured Ancestress. In an effort to hurt Quyen, Linh writes an unflattering poem at a banquet honoring Oanh. In doing so, she reveals that Hieu is trying to leave Prosper. Hieu attempts suicide out of shame, but Linh rescues him. Quyen is able to repair the Honoured Ancestress, restoring her functionality at the expense of erasing many of her memories.

The Emperor’s Embroidered Guard arrives at Prosper Station in search of Linh. Linh finds the missing mem-implants and returns them to Quyen. Quyen and Linh briefly reconcile before Linh is arrested and removed from Prosper Station.

== Major themes ==
A review in Kirkus wrote that the novel's "familiar setting" was a "departure point" for the novel to explore its themes. The novel explores family ties; almost everyone on Prosper Station is related in some fashion. Additionally, the use of ancestors' mem-implants further explores the concept of family ties, with some descendants being considered more "worthy" than others due to their higher number of implants. The novel also explores questions of worth, as those who fail at ability tests are often forced to become the "lesser partners" in marriages and are discriminated against due to their perceived lack of achievement. The author notes that it is interesting that gender plays no role in the question of worth, and that the majority of the men in the story are actually the "lesser partner" in their marriage.

== Style ==
The novel is divided into three sections. Liz Bourke wrote that each section builds thematically "towards an emotional crescendo".

== Reception ==
Writing for Locus, Liz Bourke praised the novel's exploration of interpersonal conflict between Linh and Quyen, writing that "essentially subverts the popularly-understood derogatory overtones of 'domestic conflict'". Bourke also praised the story's tension, calling it "so well-strung the prose practically vibrates under its influence". A review for Kirkus stated that the novel is a "beautifully realized story and the characters, plot, theme and writing are expertly crafted."

=== Awards ===
On a Red Station, Drifting Awards
Year	Award	Result	Reference
2012	Nebula Award for Best Novella	Finalist	
2013	Hugo Award for Best Novella	Finalist	
2013	Locus Award for Best Novella	Finalist	
