= Aliette de Bodard =

French-American speculative fiction writer (born 1982)

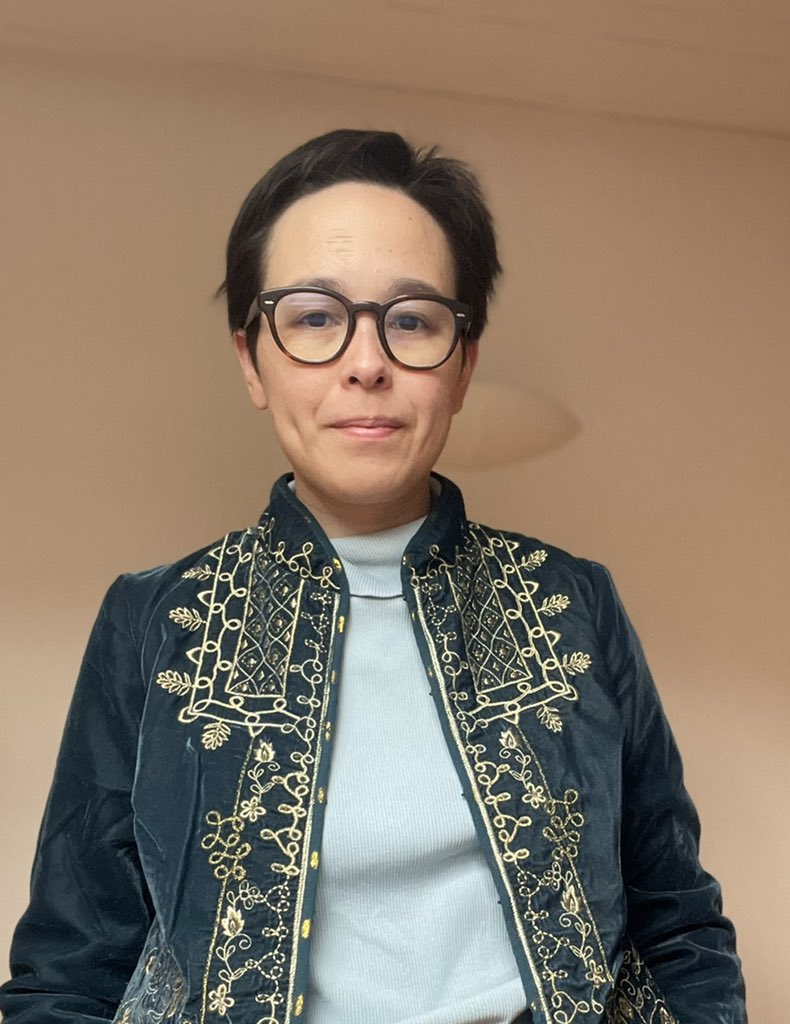
- Aliette de Bodard in 2021
- Born: November 10, 1982 (age 44); New York City, U.S.
- Occupations: Computer engineer, author
- Writing career
- Genres: Science fiction, Fantasy
- Notable works: "Immersion"; "The Waiting Stars"; The House of Shattered Wings; The Tea Master and the Detective
- Notable awards: Nebula Award for Best Short Story (2012); Nebula Award for Best Novelette (2013); Locus Award for Best Short Story (2013); BSFA Award for Best Novel (2015); BSFA Award for Best Short Story (2010, 2015); BSFA Award for Best Non-Fiction (2018); Nebula Award for Best Novella (2018); Ignyte Award for Best Novelette (2021)
- Website: aliettedebodard.com

Aliette de Bodard (born November 10, 1982) is a French-American speculative fiction writer. She has received accolades including the British Fantasy Award, BSFA Award, Ignyte Award, Locus Award, and Nebula Award.

== Writing ==
De Bodard published her first short story in 2006. In 2007, she was a winner of Writers of the Future, and in 2009 was a finalist for the John W. Campbell Award for Best New Writer. She has been published in Interzone, Hub Magazine, Black Static, Andromeda Spaceways Inflight Magazine, Asimov's, Realms of Fantasy, Apex Magazine, among others.

Her short story "The Shipmaker" won the 2010 British Science Fiction Award for Best Short Fiction. She won the 2012 Nebula Award for her short story "Immersion". The Encyclopedia of Science Fiction describes "Immersion" as "a deft intertwining of Avatar and Race in SF topoi" set in a space habitat. She also won the 2013 Nebula Award for "The Waiting Stars".

Her novel The House of Shattered Wings, set in a devastated Paris ruled by fallen angels, was published by Gollancz/Roc in August 2015. It won the BSFA Award for Best Novel of 2015. Her story "Three Cups of Grief, by Starlight" won the BSFA Award for Best Short Story of 2015, the first time a single author has ever won both fiction categories in the same year. Her Xuya Universe novella The Tea Master and the Detective won the 2018 Nebula Award for Best Novella.

== Themes ==
Many of her stories are set in alternate history worlds where Aztec or pre-communist Vietnamese cultures are dominant. In a 2018 interview with L'épaule d'Orion, she stated that "taste is largely underutilised sensorily in science-fiction... future worlds in SF have a tendency to be sanitised." In a 2021 interview with Locus, she stated that she tried to write "parent-child relationships, and very often a mother-daughter relationship, because that's a thing you don't often see, aside from the controlling mother and the estranged mother. You don't even often see characters with dead mothers – the mothers tend to just fade out."

== Personal life ==
De Bodard is of French and Vietnamese descent, born in the US, and grew up in Paris. French is her first language but she writes in English. A graduate of École Polytechnique, she works as a software engineer (as of 2024 in railway signalling), and is a member of the Written in Blood writers group. She is bisexual.

== Awards ==
Year	Title	Award	Category	Result	Ref
2009	—	John W. Campbell Award for Best New Writer	—	Finalist	
2010	"The Shipmaker"	BSFA Award	Short Fiction	Won	
2010	"The Jaguar House, in Shadow"	Nebula Award	Novelette	Finalist	
2011	"The Jaguar House, in Shadow"	Hugo Award	Novelette	Finalist	
2011	"Shipbirth"	Nebula Award	Short Story	Finalist	
2012	D'obsidienne et de sang (Servant of the Underworld)	Grand prix de l'Imaginaire	Roman étranger ('Foreign novel')	Nominated	
2012	"Immersion"	Nebula Award	Short Story	Won	
2012	On a Red Station, Drifting	Nebula Award	Novella	Finalist	
2013	"Heaven Under Earth"	James Tiptree Jr. Award	—	Honor List	
2013	"Immersion"	Locus Award	Short Story	Won	
2013	"Immersion"	Hugo Award	Short Story	Finalist	
2013	"Immersion"	Theodore Sturgeon Award	—	Finalist	
2013	On a Red Station, Drifting	Hugo Award	Novella	Finalist	
2013	On a Red Station, Drifting	Locus Award	Novella	Finalist	
2013	"Scattered Along the River of Heaven"	Theodore Sturgeon Award	—	Finalist	
2013	"The Waiting Stars"	Nebula Award	Novelette	Won	
2014	"The Breath of War"	Nebula Award	Short Story	Finalist	
2014	"Separados por las aguas del Río Celeste" ("Scattered Along the River of Heaven")	Premio Ignotus	Mejor cuento extranjero ('Best Foreign Story')	Finalist	
2014	"The Waiting Stars"	Hugo Award	Novelette	Finalist	
2014	"The Waiting Stars"	Locus Award	Novelette	Finalist	
2015	"The Dust Queen"	Locus Award	Short Story	Finalist	
2015	The House of Shattered Wings	BSFA Award	Novel	Won	
2015	"Memorials"	Locus Award	Novelette	Finalist	
2015	"Three Cups of Grief, by Starlight"	BSFA Award	Short Fiction	Won	
2015	El ciclo de Xuya (The Xuya Cycle)	Premio Ignotus	Mejor antología ('Best Collected Work')	Finalist	
2015	En una estación roja, a la deriva (On a Red Station, Drifting)	Premio Ignotus	Mejor cuento extranjero ('Best Foreign Story')	Finalist	
2015	"Éparpillés le long des rivières du ciel" ("Scattered Along the River of Heaven")	Grand prix de l'Imaginaire	Nouvelle étrangère ('Foreign novella')	Longlisted	
2016	The House of Shattered Wings	Locus Award	Fantasy Novel	Finalist	
2016	The Citadel of Weeping Pearls	Locus Award	Novella	Finalist	
2016	"Three Cups of Grief, by Starlight"	Locus Award	Short Story	Finalist	
2016	"Three Cups of Grief, by Starlight"	Eugie Award	—	Finalist	
2017	The Citadel of Weeping Pearls	Canopus Award	Previously Published Short-Form Fiction	Finalist	
2017	"Pearl"	Locus Award	Novelette	Finalist	
2017	"A Salvaging of Ghosts"	Locus Award	Short Story	Finalist	
2017	"A Salvaging of Ghosts"	WSFA Small Press Award	—	Finalist	
2018	"Tres tazas de aflicción a la luz de las estrellas" ("Three Cups of Grief, by Starlight")	Premio Ignotus	Mejor cuento extranjero ('Best Foreign Story')	Won	
2018	"Children of Thorns, Children of Water"	Locus Award	Novelette	Finalist	
2018	"Children of Thorns, Children of Water"	Hugo Award	Novelette	Finalist	
2018	The House of Binding Thorns	Locus Award	Fantasy Novel	Finalist	
2018	On Motherhood and Erasure	BSFA Award	Non-Fiction	Won	
2018	The Tea Master and the Detective	Nebula Award	Novella	Won	
2019	In the Vanishers' Palace	Lambda Literary Awards	Science Fiction, Fantasy and Horror	Finalist	
2019	The Tea Master and the Detective	British Fantasy Award	Novella	Won	
2019	The Tea Master and the Detective	Hugo Award	Novella	Finalist	
2019	The Tea Master and the Detective	Locus Award	Novella	Finalist	
2019	The Tea Master and the Detective	World Fantasy Award	Novella	Finalist	
2020	Of Wars, and Memories, and Starlight	Locus Award	Collection	Finalist	
2020	Of Wars, and Memories, and Starlight	British Fantasy Award	Collection	Shortlisted	
2020	形見 (Katami, "Memorials")	Seiun Award	Best Translated Short Story	Finalist	
2021	Fireheart Tiger	BSFA Award	Short Fiction	Won	
2021	Fireheart Tiger	Nebula Award	Novella	Finalist	
2021	"The Inaccessibility of Heaven"	Ignyte Award	Novelette	Won	
2021	"The Inaccessibility of Heaven"	Hugo Award	Novelette	Finalist	
2021	"The Inaccessibility of Heaven"	Locus Award	Novelette	Finalist	
2021	"In the Lands of the Spill"	Locus Award	Short Story	Finalist	
2021	Of Dragons, Feasts and Murders	Locus Award	Novella	Finalist	
2021	Seven of Infinities	Locus Award	Novella	Finalist	
2022	Fireheart Tiger	Locus Award	Novella	Finalist	
2022	Fireheart Tiger	Hugo Award	Novella	Finalist	
2022	Fireheart Tiger	Ignyte Award	Novella	Finalist	
2022	"Mulberry and Owl"	Locus Award	Novelette	Finalist	
2022	Of Charms, Ghosts and Grievances	BSFA Award	Short Fiction	Won	
2022	The Red Scholar's Wake	BSFA Award	Novel	Finalist	
2023	Of Charms, Ghosts and Grievances	Locus Award	Novella	Finalist	
2023	The Red Scholar's Wake	Arthur C. Clarke Award	—	Shortlisted	
2023	The Red Scholar's Wake	Locus Award	SF Novel	Finalist	
2024	A Fire Born of Exile	Locus Award	SF Novel	Finalist	
2024	"The Mausoleum's Children"	Hugo Award	Short Story	Finalist	
2024	"The Mausoleum's Children"	Locus Award	Short Story	Finalist	
2024	Navigational Entanglements	BSFA Award	Shorter Fiction	Finalist	
2024	The Universe of Xuya	Hugo Award	Series	Finalist	
2025	"Autumn's Red Bird"	Locus Award	Locus Award for Best Short Story	Finalist	
2025	Navigational Entanglements	Hugo Award	Novella	Finalist	
2025	Navigational Entanglements	Locus Award	Novella	Finalist	
2025	—	ESFS Awards	Best Author	Won	
