= Death of the Author (novel) =

Africanfuturist novel by Nnedi Okorafor

- Author: Nnedi Okorafor
- Language: English
- Genre: Science fiction, Africanfuturism
- Publisher: William Morrow
- Publication date: January 14, 2025
- Publication place: United States
- Pages: 448
- ISBN: 978-0063445789

Death of the Author is a 2025 Africanfuturist novel by Nigerian American author Nnedi Okorafor. The book follows Zelunjo Onyenezi-Onyedele, a Nigerian American writer who gains critical success through the publication of a science fiction work, entitled Rusted Robots. The novel has received critical acclaim for its exploration of themes including authorship and narrative; artificial intelligence; disability; and diasporic identity.

== Plot ==
The book centers on the main character, Zelunjo Onyenezi-Onyedele (Zelu), a Nigerian-American writer who became paraplegic at the age of 12 following an accident. The story follows Zelu as she transforms from a struggling writer to best-selling author. At her sister's wedding, Zelu learns that she has been fired from her position as an adjunct writing professor in Chicago. Following this, she returns to her parents' house where she ultimately writes her block-buster debut novel, Rusted Robots. The book becomes an instant success and is quickly adapted into a movie. The book brings Zelu instant fame and wealth. Zelu has a complicated relationship with her family, and their reaction to her success is mixed.

After the publication of Rusted Robots, Zelu is approached by an MIT Scientist, Hugo Wagner, who offers her the chance to try out a new assistive technology he has been developing to enable paraplegics like Zelu to walk. Zelu agrees and begins using the technology referred to as an exoskeliton in lieu of a wheel chair. Her adoption of the technology is critiqued by her family as well as by disability activists.

Following the debut of the movie adaptation of her novel, Zelu is introduced to Jack Preston, a tech mogul who offers her the chance to go to space as part of his commercial mission. Despite her family's vehement opposition, Zelu ultimately agrees to go on the space mission. She discovers that she is pregnant shortly before the mission is to leave.

=== Rusted Robots ===
Rusted Robots, the novel that brings Zelu instant fame, is written as interspersed chapters within the main novel. The story takes place in a future where all humans have perished save one, an Igbo woman named Ngozi. In this futuristic landscape, two different types of machine entities are at odds with one another. Humes are robots with physical forms modeled after human bodies. Their primary function is to collect human stories and narratives. NoBodies are artificial intelligences that reject physical forms and seek to destroy all Humes. The conflict between these two factions is told through the main characters of Ankara, a Hume, and Ijele, a NoBody. After the NoBodies succeed in destroying the majority of Humes through a protocol called Rusted Robots, Ankara is damaged. Nogozi, the only remaining human, repairs Ankara by introducing the AI, Ijele, into Ankara's body. Despite initially appalled by their situation, Ankara and Ijele develop a strong and lasting friendship that persists even once Ijele is freed from Ankara's physical form. Ankara and Ijele ultimately save both of their respective machine tribes by working together to defeat a common enemy known as Trippers, an extra-terrestrial robot entity seeking to destroy the earth. They defeat the Trippers through telling the narrative of Zelu and her life that they learn from Ngozi.

== Themes ==
Okorafor explores the relationship between the author and their creations through the lens of Africanfuturism, a term she coined to describe her work. The novel also examines a range of issues, such as disability, identity, diasporic culture, social media and influence, colonialism, as well as the rise of AI-driven technologies.

Gary K. Wolfe noted that the family dynamics in Death of the Author recall elements of Okorafor's earlier works, including Akata Witch. Death of the Author explores the challenge of navigating relationships with high-achieving family members, including physicians and lawyers, as well as the concept of "Naijamerican" identity.

Bernabé S. Mendoza wrote that classic science fiction novels often "stretch" the concept of humanity by combining humans with either machines or animals. Human-machine hybrids, or cyborgs, are portrayed as an advancement; human-animal hybrids are portrayed as a step backwards. The Western conception of Cartesian dualism underlies some of these portrayals. Western thought generally considers the pure mind to be superior to the physical body. The story-within-a-story of Rusted Robots pits the NoBodies (representing Cartesian minds) against the Humes (representing embodiment). The episode in which Ijele is moved inside Ankara's body "eventually [leads] to the unification of all automation, or the posthuman." This combination eventually allows Ankara to write an original story, leading to the thematic climax of the novel: "Stories, the text insists, unify the mind and body, spirit and flesh. And through unification, stories also heal."

Key to the work is also an exploration of the relationship between AI and the creation of art.

== Style ==
The main action of the novel is Zelu's story, set in a near-future Chicago. More than one fifth of the novel consists of excerpts from Rusted Robots. Gary K. Wolfe noted that "Ankara’s narrative provides a valuable counterpoint to Zelu's." Rusted Robots is told in 13 separate chapters interspersed throughout the main storyline.

== Background ==
Okorafor first sold the novel under the title The Africanfuturist; it was later changed to Death of the Author.

In a CBC interview with Mattea Roach, Okorafor discussed some her inspirations for the novel. The book's title draws from 1967 essay "The Death of the Author" by Roland Barthes. Okorafor disagrees with Barthes, who concluded that "the author must die so the reader can live." Okorafor believes that an author and their work cannot be untangled: "This idea of separating the two, I just don't think it's possible and I don't think it's necessary."

Okorafor described the family dynamics in the novel as "near autobiographical." Okorafor was paralyzed from the waist down at the age of nineteen. She had two older sisters and one younger brother; she began writing Death of the Author two days after the death of her sister. During the writing process, Okorafor wanted to explore the tension between the community-based Nigerian ethos, the individuality-based American ethos, and the complicated interplay of being Nigerian and American. Okorafor named the character Ngozi after her sister. In the novel, Ngozi is the only surviving human in the subplot of Rusted Robots.

== Reception and awards ==
Publishers Weekly gave the novel a starred review, stating that the book "explores what it means to be human through the lens of artistic creation." The review praised the metafictional plot twist and concluded that the work is "an impressive feat of Africanfuturism." Laura Hubbard of BookPage also gave the novel a starred review, wrote that the book straddles genres and praised both Zelu's story and the chapters from Rusted Robots. Hubbard stated that these chapters "give us a lens through which to see Zelu more clearly—and influence the course of her journey." The review concluded that Death of the Author "surprises all the way to its brilliant ending."

Kyle Garton of Strange Horizons stated that the novel is "a magnificent achievement by a mature writer at the height of her powers." The review praised the "compellingly flawed" protagonist.

Writing for Locus, Gary K. Wolfe wrote that the title serves as a caution against reading Zelu as an autobiographical representation of Okorafor. Despite clear parallels with the author's life, Zelu is her own character: "often impulsive and not always sympathetic, and her issues with family, identity, and fame are her own as well." Wolfe concluded that the novel is different from Okorafor's previous work, but that "it may be one of her most revealing, deeply felt, and insightful novels to date."

Reema Saleh of the Chicago Review of Books commented that "it’s hard to figure out where to shelve it in the library." The novel has received comparisons to Yellowface by R. F. Kuang, which is also a satire of the publishing industry and discusses how the industry can dilute the message of authors. The book is set in Chicago, with Saleh stating that "Rather than some vague, nameless American every-city, it felt like home because it was a city I recognized..." The reviewer stated that her only criticism the way in which Zelu's family interviews seemed to indicate a large tragedy that never occurs. Saleh describes this as a letdown: "There’s rising action that builds but no release."

Year	Award	Category	Result	Ref.
2025	Los Angeles Times Book Prize	Science Fiction, Fantasy, and Speculative Fiction	Finalist	
2025	Nebula Award	Novel	Finalist	
2026	Goldsboro Books Glass Bell Award	Outstanding Work of Contemporary - Fiction	Pending	
2026	Hugo Award	Novel	Pending	
2026	Locus Award	Science Fiction Novel	Won	
2026	NAACP Image Award	Literary Work - Fiction	Won	

Death of the Author represented Okorafor's first NAACP Image Award and her second nomination; in 2008, The Shadow Speaker was nominated in the Youth/Teen category.
