= One Way Witch =

2024 novella by Nnedi Okorafor

- Author: Nnedi Okorafor
- Audio read by: Yetide Badaki
- Language: English
- Series: She Who Knows
- Release number: 2
- Genre: Fantasy
- Publisher: DAW Books
- Publication date: 29 Apr 2025
- Publication place: United States
- Pages: 240 (Hardcover)
- ISBN: 9780756418977
- Preceded by: She Who Knows
- Followed by: The Daughter Who Remains

One Way Witch is a 2025 novella by Nnedi Okorafor. It is a sequel to She Who Knows (2024) and continues the story of Najeeba, who also appears in Okorafor's novel Who Fears Death. It was followed by The Daughter Who Remains (2026).

== Plot ==
After the events of Who Fears Death, the world has forgotten Onyesonwu. History is divided into the Before, in which Onyesonwu existed, and the Now, a reality in which Nuru and Okeke people live in relative harmony. Only Najeeba and Aro remember Onyesonwu's existence.

On the day when Onyesonwu leaves Jwahir, Najeeba journeys into the desert and becomes a kponyungo for the first time in decades. She participates in the events of Onyesonwu's journey, preparing the way for her daughter. On the night of Onyesonwu's death, she experiences the world shifting around her, dividing the Before from the Now.

In her kponyungo form, Najeeba visits her childhood village of Adoro 5. She sees the Cleanser, a creature in service to the goddess Adoro. The Cleanser once took Najeeba's aunt, who was forever “different” after returning. This has happened to many Osunu girls over the past decades. Najeeba vows to destroy the Cleanser.

Najeeba recounts her past to Aro, narrating her life story up to that point. (Note: Najeeba recounts the entire novella She Who Knows, which is presented with a frame story involving Najeeba and Aro.) He agrees to train her in sorcery. Najeeba goes through initiation, where she sees her own death at the hands of a powerful eldritch creature known as a masquerade.

Najeeba meets Dedan, a glassblower who has moved to Jwahir from the Seven Rivers Kingdom. They become lovers. Meanwhile, she continues her training with Aro and Aro's mentor Sola, growing substantially in her magical abilities. She learns to raise animals from the dead, travel through space and time, and see both the future and the past. (Note: In one scene, Najeeba sees a vision of the event that almost destroyed Earth, leading to the current climate. This is recounted in The Book of Phoenix.) Najeeba tells Dedan all about the Before and Onyesonwu. Dedan becomes increasingly paranoid and violent after learning about the Before. He becomes enraged and destroys his glass house, a beautiful moment that he had built with Najeeba's assistance. This event is witnessed by Daib, who also remembers the Before and has come to Jwahir to speak to Najeeba.

Daib asks for forgiveness. He can also remember the Before. He states that he no longer feels hatred towards the Okeke people, but is haunted by memories of the previous version of himself. In her form as the kponyungo, Najeeba pulls a dark creature from his skull. This removes his hatred, but he can still remember the past. She considers this to be a fair atonement and lets him go. Najeeba accidentally summons a rainstorm which floods Jwahir. The storm damages the village, but it also heralds the arrival of more regular rainstorms and a change in the harsh desert climate. Aro considers Najeeba's training complete. She and Dedan leave Jwahir on a quest to kill the Cleanser.

== Reception and awards ==
Jessica Peng of BookPage praised the novel's prose, calling it "simple in execution but expansive and authoritative in the ideas it relays." Peng called the novel "another Okorafor classic, a statement on politics, gender and history delivered as an unputdownable read." Gary K. Wolfe of Locus stated that Okorafor's abilities as a visual writer "maintain focus during what some readers might see as the more leisurely pacing of the plot in its middle sections." The review concluded by stating that "One Way Witch may be Okorafor’s reminder that the work of liberation is never finally done. Marlene Harris of Library Journal wrote that the novel was the "story of [Najeeba] going one way, forward into the future" and called it a "coming-into-power" story. Harris recommended the novel for fans of Tobi Ogundiran and Suyi Davies Okungbowa.

A review in AudioFile discussed the audiobook, read by Yetide Badaki. The review stated that the narrator's raspy voice reflected the throat damage suffered by the character of Najeeba. The same review praised Badaki's smooth voice and consistent pacing.

Publishers Weekly wrote that the plot was more of a set-up for the third book than a full-fledged story. Despite this, the review stated that "the strength of the world, and the heroine, makes this one shine."

One Way Witch is a finalist for the 2026 Nommo Award for Best Novella.
