= The Daughter Who Remains =

2026 novella by Nnedi Okorafor

- Author: Nnedi Okorafor
- Audio read by: Yetide Badaki
- Language: English
- Series: She Who Knows
- Release number: 3
- Genre: Fantasy
- Publisher: DAW Books
- Publication date: 17 February 2026
- Publication place: United States
- Pages: 181 (Hardcover)
- ISBN: 9780756418991
- Preceded by: One Way Witch

The Daughter Who Remains is a 2026 novella by Nnedi Okorafor. It is the final entry in the She Who Knows trilogy of novellas. It concludes the story of Najeeba, a sorceress who seeks to kill a malevolent creature known as the Cleanser.

== Plot ==
Najeeba journeys into the desert with the glass maker Dedan and their camels, MorningStar and Tende. Together, they plan to kill the Cleanser.

Najeeba goes into labor just as a greater witch, a large dust storm, approaches. She leaves her body as the kponyungo and reaches Ssolu, the village of the Vah people. The Vah people assist Najeeba through her labor. She gives birth to a daughter named Ikuku, which means “wind”. The Vah people call the baby Sssolu, after their village.

Najeeba and a Vah sorcerer, Ting, travel to Adoro 5. They visit the Paper House, a library. They speak to the overseer and receive a document about the Cleanser. As the two sorcerers read about the Cleanser, a masquerade appears. This spirit tells her that the Cleanser will appear in about one month.

Najeeba spends a final month with Dedan and Sssolu before leaving the Vah and traveling to Adoro 5. She expects the Cleanser to arrive in her home village, but it approaches the village of Ssolu and moves toward Najeeba’s daughter. Najeeba quickly takes the form of the kponyungo and flies back to the Vah village, leaving her body under a palm tree.

Najeeba confronts the Cleanser. They fight, and she eventually destroys its physical body. She flies back to her body, where she is pursued by a masquerade. The Cleanser’s true spiritual form is revealed. Inside a temple of Adoro, Najeeba and the spirit engage in a final confrontation. Najeeba dies, and her spirit assumes the form of the kponyungo and flies across the desert.

== Reception and awards ==
Kirkus Reviews called the novella a "page turner", stating that it is a story for mothers and daughters who have experienced great challenges and have resolved to face them anyway. The review called the novella "a fable-like story about how to walk straight into the storm, face insurmountable challenges, and fight for freedom."

Marlene Harris of Library Journal called the book a "stunning conclusion". Harris commented that Onyesonwu left Najeeba behind at the end of Who Fears Death; simultaneously, Najeeba leaves behind a daughter at the end of this novella. Harris stated that this sacrifice "brings her journey full circle with a marvelously satisfying ending."

Writing for Locus, Gary K. Wolfe noted that the conclusion may seem abrupt; however, "Okorafor has always been more interested in exploring more details about her complex future world than in mounting large-scale set pieces." Wolfe noted that the series includes both science fiction and fantasy elements, but that the fantasy elements predominate in this entry. The review described the book's tone as "that of a tale becoming a legend."
