= Africanfuturism =

African aesthetic and literary genre

Africanfuturism is a cultural aesthetic that centers on the fusion of African culture, history, mythology, point of view, with technology based in Africa. It was coined in 2018 by Nigerian-American writer Nnedi Okorafor in a social media post, who then expanded the concept in her 2019 blog post "Africanfuturism defined".

The setting of this genre includes fantasy set in the future, creating a narrative that is "more science than fantasy" and typically has mystical elements. At its core is the African continent, compared to Afrofuturism, which centers the African diaspora, specifically in the United States. Works of Africanfuturism include science fiction, fantasy, alternate history, horror and magic realism.

== Definition ==
Nnedi Okorafor defines Africanfuturism as a sub-category of science fiction that is "directly rooted in African culture, history, mythology and point-of-view..and...does not privilege or center the West," A main theme of Africanfuturism is the desire to return to the creator's roots without losing sight of the future and technological process. This theme questions if those of non-African descent can create Africanfuturism works and what content can fall into the category. Many works that have been classified as Afrofuturism could be considered Africanfuturism.

== History ==
=== Early beginnings ===
Works of Africanfuturism have long existed and have been assigned to Afrofuturism. Themes of Africanfuturism can be traced back to Buchi Emecheta's 1983 novel The Rape Of Shavi and Ben Okri's 1991 novel The Famished Road.

=== 21st century ===
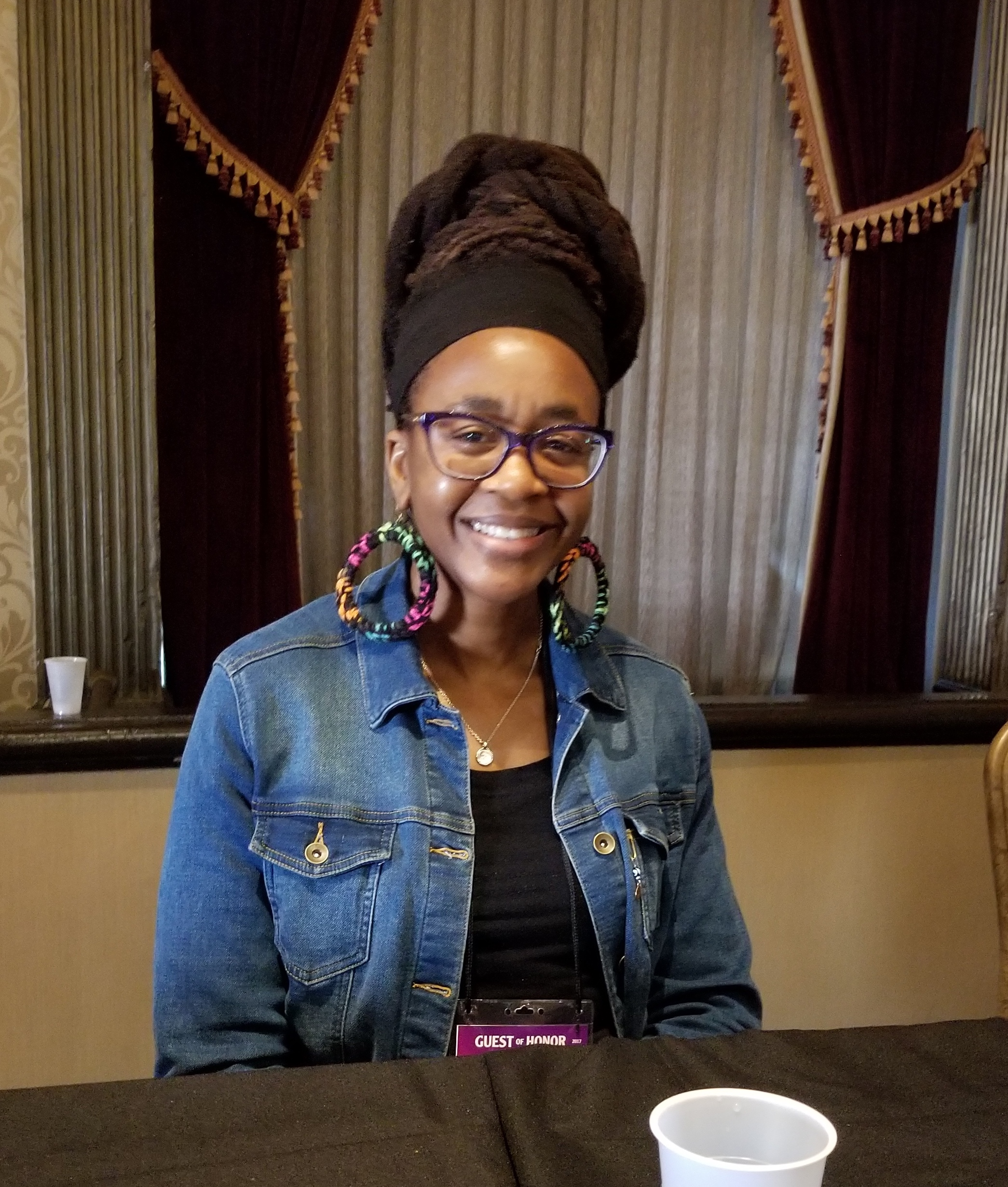
Nnedi Okorafor, author credited for coining the word "Africanfuturism"

In 2019 and 2020, African writers began to reject the term Afrofuturism because of its focus on African diaspora history, culture, and themes. Africanfuturism is centered on an African point of view, culture, and themes. The speculative fiction magazine Omenana and the Nommo Awards, presented by The African Speculative Fiction Society, launched in 2017 helped to widen the content of the genre.

=== Africanfuturism vs. Afrofuturism ===
In August 2020, Hope Wabuke, a writer and assistant professor at the University of Nebraska–Lincoln of English and Creative Writing, noted that Afrofuturism, coined by Mark Dery, a white critic, in 1993, treats African-American themes and concerns in the "context of twentieth-century technoculture," which was later expanded by Alondra Nelson, arguing that Dery's conception of Blackness began in 1619 and "is marked solely by the ensuing 400 years of violation by whiteness" that he portrayed as "potentially irreparable." Critical of this definition, saying it lacks the qualities of the "Black American diasporic imagination" and ability to conceive of "Blackness outside of the Black American diaspora" or independent from Whiteness, she noted that "Africanfuturism" is different because it is, according to Nnedi Okorafor, more deeply rooted in "African culture, history, mythology and point-of-view as it then branches into the Black diaspora, and it does not privilege or center the West," while explaining Africanjujuism as a subcategory of fantasy. Wabuke further explains how Africanfuturism is more specific and rids itself of the "othering of the white gaze and the de facto colonial Western mindset," free from what she calls the "white Western gaze" and saying this is the main difference "between Afrofuturism and Africanfuturism." She adds that, in her view, Africanfuturism has a different outlook and perspective than "mainstream Western and American science fiction and fantasy" and even Afrofuturism which is "married to the white Western gaze." Wabuke goes on to explain Africanfuturist and Africanjujuist themes in Okorafor's Who Fears Death and Zahrah the Windseeker, Akwaeke Emezi's Pet, and Buchi Emecheta's The Rape of Shavi.

In February 2021, Aigner Loren Wilson of Tor.com explained the difficulty of finding books in the subgenre because many institutions "treat Africanfuturism and Afrofuturism like the same thing" even though the distinction between them is plain. She said that Africanfuturism is "centered in and about Africa and their people" while Afrofuturism is a sci-fi subcategory which is about "Black people within the diaspora," often including stories of those outside Africa, including in "colonized Western societies.". Another reviewer called Okorafor's Lagoon, which "recounts the story of the arrival of aliens in Nigeria," as an Africanfuturist work which requires a reader who is "actively engaged in co-creating the alternative future that the novel is constructing," meaning that the reader becomes part of the "creative conversation."

=== Research publication ===
In 2024, Kimberly Cleveland, the associate professor of art history at Georgia State University, wrote Africanfuturism: African Imaginings of Other Times, Spaces and Worlds. According to the publishing company, Ohio University Press, the book is summarized as such: "Kimberly Cleveland uses Africanfuturism as an intellectual lens to explore works that embody combinations of possibilities, challenges, and concerns related to what lies ahead for the continent and its peoples. This book highlights twenty-first-century film, video, painting, sculpture, photography, tapestry, novels, short stories, comic books, song lyrics, and architecture by African creatives of different nationalities, races, ethnicities, genders, and generations. Cleveland analyzes the ideas and opinions of African intellectuals and cultural producers, combining interviews with historical research." The book also discusses the opinions of African-born citizens regarding Afrofuturism versus Africanfuturism. On page two of Africanfuturism: African Imaginings of Other Times, Spaces and Worlds, Cleveland writes, "While many intellectuals in the United States now include African speculative expression in their examinations of a wider body of Afrofuturism, a growing number of Africans and Africanists have voiced concerns about this approach. They do not take issue with the concept of Afrofuturism in the US context but rather with extending the Afrofuturist label to African creative work without distinction. Some Africans and Africanists have pointed out that this tendency glosses over cultural, environmental, and racial factors relevant to the African work; fails to take into account that Afrofuturism centers the Western imagination and gaze; and frames its discourse on US-originated and US-oriented terminology.”

== Literature ==
Africanfuturism literature features speculative fiction which narrates events centered on Africa from an African point of view rather than a Western point of view. Works of Africanfuturism literature are still wrongly categorized as Afrofuturism. Writers of Africanfuturism include Nnedi Okorafor, Tochi Onyebuchi, Oghenechovwe Donald Ekpeki, Tade Thompson, Namwali Serpell, Wole Talabi, and Suyi Davies Okungbowa.

Works of Nigerian American writer Nnedi Okorafor are often in the Africanfuturism genre with her works like Who Fears Death, Lagoon, Remote Control, The Book of Phoenix and Noor. She won a Hugo and Nebula award for her novella Binti, the first from the Binti trilogy which features a native Himba girl from Namibia in space. Tade Thompson won an Arthur C. Clarke award for his Africanfuturist novel Rosewater about an alien dome in Nigeria and Zambian writer Namwali Serpell's The Old Drift won the same award.

In 2020, Africanfuturism: An Anthology edited by Wole Talabi was published by Brittle Paper and as of the end of 2022 is currently still offered for free on its website in celebration of the 10th anniversary of this publisher which has been called "the village square of African literature". Gary K. Wolfe reviewed this anthology in February 2021. He credits Nnedi Okorafor for coining "Africanfuturism," noting its describes "more Africa-centered SF," although saying he is not sure whether her term "Africanjujuism," a parallel term for fantasy, will catch on. While saying that both are useful, he says that he does not like how they have to "do with the root, not the prefix," with "futurism" only describing a bit of science fiction and fantasy. He still calls the book a "solid anthology," saying it challenges the idea of viewing African science fiction as monolithic. Stories in the book include "Egoli" by T. L. Huchu, "Yat Madit" by Dilman Dila, "Behind Our Irises" by Tlotlo Tsamaase, "Fort Kwame" by Derek Lubangakene, "Rainmaker" by Mazi Nwonwu, "Fruit of the Calabash" by Rafeeat Aliyu, "Lekki Lekki" by Mame Bougouma Diene, and "Sunrise" by Nnedi Okorafor.

When Tor.com outlined a list of stories and books from the genre as of 2021, Tor also highlighted Africanfuturism: An Anthology (edited by Wole Talabi) along with the individual works of Namwali Serpell's The Old Drift, Nnedi Okorafor's Lagoon, Nicky Drayden's The Prey of Gods, Oghenechovwe Donald Ekpeki's Ife-Iyoku, the Tale of Imadeyunuagbon, and Tochi Onyebuchi's War Girls.

== Comics ==
In comics, as of the end of 2022, a few Africanfuturism comics exist. Comic Republic Global Network, a Lagos-based publisher, is prominent in creating Africanfuturist superheroes like Guardian Prime.

Nnedi Okorafor has created and written for comics that fall in the Africanfuturism genre. Laguardia, a four issue mini series that follows the Nigerian-American Doctor Nwafor Chukwuebuka in a futuristic New York City who smuggled an illegal alien plant through the Laguardia International and Interstellar Airport. In 2018, she wrote Shuri, a five issue Marvel comic focusing on Shuri's life after the absence of her brother, T'Challa.

Roye Okupe wrote and created the E.X.O.: The Legend of Wale Williams. The graphic novel follows Wale Williams and set in futuristic Nigeria. His next graphic novel series Malika: Warrior Queen, set in 15th century the graphic novel gives more context to the characters and context of E.X.O.: The Legend of Wale Williams. Most notably he created the Iyanu: Child of Wonder graphic novel which ended up being picked up and animated by Lion Forge Entertainment. Titled Iyanu, it was animated by Cartoon Network and Max. Okupe was a producer on the show.

== Films and television ==
Africanfuturism movies are often scarce. Films like Black Panther have been criticized by some viewers, who say that their depiction of Africa "differs little from the colonial view". In recent times, Africanfuturist movies include Hello, Rain, Pumzi, and Ratnik. Several Africanfuturism novels have been optioned for live adaptation, including Binti and Who Fears Death. In 2020, Walt Disney Studios and Pan African company Kugali announced that they would be co-producing an africanfuturist animated science fiction series, Iwájú, inspired by the city of Lagos. More production is planned with Nigerian entertainment company Vortex Comics (now known as VX Comics) branching out globally with a production deal to adapt their African superhero for film and Television.

On July 5, 2023, Kizazi Moto: Generation Fire, an Africanfuturist animated anthology short film series premiered on Disney+. Peter Ramsey was picked as executive producer, while Tendayi Nyeke and Anthony Silverston were supervising producers, and Triggerfish was the primary studio, along with other animation studios in Africa. Each of the ten films is from an African perspective, on themes such as social media, duality, disability, self-reflection, shared humanity, and other topics, with stories which include time travel, extraterrestrials, and alternate universes.

Muchiri Njenga has directed the short film Kichwateli (2011). According to Njenga's self-created art production studio, called STUDIOANG, "'Kichwateli' (Swahili for TV-head) is a short film by Muchiri Njenga set in a post-apocalyptic African slum and city. This film takes the viewer on a spiritual and metaphorical voyage through a young boy's dream mixing new imagery of a young boy wondering inquisitively with a live TV as his head to show the effects of media on a young generation."

== Contemporary art ==
Muchiri Njenga, a Kenyan-born contemporary artist who produces works that can be categorized under Africanfuturism subject matter. His work includes film, animation, photography, and installation art. In the 2015 Post-African Futures Exhibition curated by Tegan Bristow, Njenga has several Africanfuturist art pieces featured.

Jacque Njeri is a multi-disciplinary artist who is currently based in Nairobi, Kenya. Her work often takes the form of sci-fi and futuristic interpretations of African settings. One of her projects, MaaSci, is a collection of digitally manipulated photographs that investigates the Kenyan-Maasai peoples in alternate science fiction universes. A specific work from the MaaSci series is featured as cover art for Kimberly Cleveland’s work, Africanfuturism: African Imaginings of Other Times, Spaces, and Worlds.

Mary Sibande is a multi-disciplinary artist who was born in Barberton, South Africa. Her work is often categorized as under the Afrofuturism label, but considering the context and her birthplace, her work is more suited to fit Africanfuturism. In particular, her sculpture and photography series of an alter-ego avatar named Sophie / Elsie. Sophie is an identity that was created by Sibande to honor her late great-grandmother. This alter-ego is often depicted in several different personas, representing the imagined possible futures that could've been, falling under the "alternate history" definition of Africanfuturism. In Sibande's work, They Don't Make Them Like They Used To, was discussed in Cleveland's book on Africanfuturism: "The foregrounding of the African narrative and incorporation of the fantastic are common characteristics of Africanfuturist expression and, in this particular work, help to introduce Black female representation into the national artistic narrative."
