= Remote Control (novella) =

2021 novella by Nnedi Okorafor

- First edition
- Author: Nnedi Okorafor
- Audio read by: Adjoa Andoh
- Cover artist: Greg Ruth
- Language: English
- Genre: Science fiction, Africanfuturism
- Publisher: Tor books
- Publication date: January 19, 2021
- Publication place: Nigeria

Remote Control is a 2021 science fiction novella by Nigerian American Nnedi Okorafor. It is Okorafor's first novella after the Binti Trilogy and is set in the same universe as Okorafor's Who Fears Death and The Book of Phoenix.

It was a finalist for the 2021 Goodreads Choice Awards for Best Science Fiction and the Locus Awards.

== Plot summary ==
In Ghana, fourteen-year-old Sankofa travels on foot, followed by her fox Movenpick. She invites herself to a Christmas party hosted by strangers. The adults all seem afraid of her, while ten-year-old Edgar is fascinated by the local legends surrounding her. Sankofa shows off her power of "remote control", in which she glows with a green light. A gateman attempts to kill Sankofa, but her green light overwhelms and kills him.

In a flashback, four-year-old Fatima sits in a shea tree during a meteor shower. A glowing green object strikes the ground at the base of the tree. The next year, a box rises from the same area; within the box is the same seed. A politician pays Fatima’s family a substantial sum of money for the box and seed. The politician is then robbed, and the artifacts are taken.

When Fatima is seven, she begins experiencing intermittent feelings of fever. During these episodes, pain causes her to emit a green light. While crossing the street, Fatima is struck on the hip by a car. Green light explodes from her, killing everyone around her. The victims include her brother, both parents, and almost the entire population of her town. After this, Fatima adopts the name Sankofa.

Sankofa finds that she can sense the presence of the seed and begins walking toward it. She quickly learns that she cannot ride in a car; any technology that she touches stops working. Sankofa is attacked by a man; her green light kills him. Word of her dangerous powers begins to spread ahead of her. Over the next several years, Sankofa pursues the seed across northern Ghana. The seed is continually moving and always seems to be one step ahead of her. She finally catches up to the thief, who reveals that he has recently lost the seed. Sankofa kills him and promises to stop following the seed; she believes it to be the cause of her family’s deaths.

Sankofa meets a woman named Alhaja, who owns an electronics store. Sankofa scares off a group of thieves with her green light; she then moves in with Alhaja. At the local market, she finds her box. Sankofa accidentally damages a robotic policeman, resulting in a child being struck and killed by a car. An angry mob begins to stone her; the green light bursts forward unintentionally, killing the several mob members along with Alhaja. Sankofa flees from the town.

Alone in the wilderness, Sankofa tries to destroy the seed; she fails. After spending several months living in nature, she is spotted by a bus full of people. Sankofa begins to walk once again. The story returns to the first chapter. Sankofa continues her journey, returning to her hometown for the first time in six years. She learns that the town has been repopulated, and that the corporation LifeGen has taken over many of the buildings. She buries her seed at the base of the shea tree where she first found it. Sankofa awakens to find that most of the shea trees in town are glowing with her green light. Sankofa takes control of the light, causing it to shine brighter and brighter.

== Writing process ==
Okorafor wrote the book during the COVID-19 pandemic, stating in an interview that travel disruptions due to the pandemic made her focus her energy on writing and editing the book. The events in the book takes place before the events in The Book of Phoenix and Who Fears Death.

== Themes ==
The book has been noted as a coming-of-age story, exploring themes such as solitude, grief, and what it means to be normal. The book is an Africanfuturist novella.

== Reception ==
Writing for NPR, Jason Heller described the novel as "a cumulative narrative, a slow burn that builds in emotional urgency even as the scope of Okorafor's worldbuilding bursts into something breathtakingly vast."

Writing for New Scientist, Layal Liverpool stated that "Remote Control is thrilling and surprising all the way through." Samantha Nelson of The A.V. Club, however, stated that "Sankofa is a fascinating character, but one whose legend isn’t quite compelling enough to take hold in our world."
