= Joystone =

Studio album by Jimi Tenor & Kabu Kabu
- Released: April 2007
- Genre: Jazz, Afrobeat
- Length: 63:39
- Label: Sähkö Recordings, Ubiquity
- Producer: Didier Selin

Jimi Tenor & Kabu Kabu chronology
| Joystone (2007) | 4th Dimension (2009) |

Professional ratings
Review scores
| Source | Rating |
|---|---|
| Allmusic | link |

Joystone is a studio album collaboration between Jimi Tenor and Kabu Kabu, a group of west-African musicians living in Berlin. Former Fela Kuti bandmate Nicholas Addo Nettey contributed vocals to track twelve.
