= Zahrah the Windseeker =

2005 fantasy novel by Nnedi Okorafor

- Author: Nnedi Okorafor
- Illustrator: Stephanie Cooper and Amanda Hall
- Genre: Fantasy
- Published: 2005 (HMCo Children's Books)
- Publication place: Nigeria
- Media type: Book
- Pages: 308
- ISBN: 978-0-618-34090-3
- OCLC: 56104248
- LC Class: PZ7.O4157 Zah 2005

Zahrah the Windseeker is a young adult fantasy novel and the debut novel of Nigerian American writer Nnedi Okorafor, published in September 2005. It incorporates Nigerian myths, folklore, and culture. It is the winner of the 2008 Wole Soyinka Prize for Literature in Africa.

== Plot ==
The novel takes place in the fictional northern kingdom of Ooni, located on the planet Ginen, where technology is made using plants. Children who are born with Dada (dreadlocks) are despised because of an old rumor about them possessing magical abilities. The kingdom is enclosed by the forbidden greeny jungle.

Zahrah Tsami is thirteen years old and lives with her parents. She was born with Dada, which means vines grow among her hair, and she is often ridiculed by her peers, except for her best friend, Dari. Zahrah discovers her ability to fly as a windseeker, but she is afraid of heights, which makes her feel anxious.

During one of their secret trips to the greeny jungle to practice and explore with the aid of a digibook written by explorers, Dari is bitten by a snake and falls into a deep coma. The doctor prescribes a serum made from an unfertilized Elgort (a huge dinosaur-like creature) egg as the only cure for Dari's ailment.

Zahrah escapes from home with the digibook and her compass to the forbidden greeny jungle in order to obtain an Elgort egg. She meets the annoying shining pink frog and others who advise her to go back home. While in the jungle, Zahrah discovers that the chapter in the digibook containing information about the Elgort is broken and she cannot access it.

After staying in the village of the gorilla, where technology is forbidden, she is told that only the rude shining pink frog can tell her how to get an Elgort egg. Zahrah ventures into the forest again until she is met by Nsibidi, a windseeker who has come to take her home. Zahrah runs and comes across the pink frog, who finally tells her how to get the egg.

She succeeds in stealing an unfertilized Elgort egg and is able to fly just before the Elgort catches her. Zahrah heads back home, where she reunites with her parents, and the egg is used to create the serum that awakens Dari.

== Characters ==
- Zharah Tsami: The protagonist is a 13-year-old girl. The kids at school taunt Zahrah for being a witch who doesn't deserve the popular Dari because of her dada, and she is desperate to get the unfertilized Elgort egg to cure her friend Dari. She is shy and quiet, and learns to take responsibility while in the forbidden Greeny jungle.
- Dari: Dari is Zarah's only friend and a popular kid at school. He is brave and curious to explore the forbidden green jungle after reading a digibook about it. However, he is later bitten by a snake and falls into a deep coma, only to be awakened after receiving the Elgort Serum.
- Nsibidi: Nsibidi is a windseeker who sells charms at the Dark Market. She mentors Zarah briefly and motivates her to build her ability to fly. Nsibidi is biracial, as her mother is from Earth.
- The frog: The shiny pink frog with gold speckles is a rude annoying frog, which has the answer to all questions and helps Zarah in getting an Elgort egg.
- Obax: The king of the gorilla which accommodates Zarah in the gorilla town where technology is forbidden.
- Papa Grip: The leader of the small town where Zarah lives.

== Awards ==
- 2008 The Wole Soyinka Prize for Literature in Africa, won
- 2005 Carl Brandon Parallax and Kindred Awards, shortlisted
- Garden State Teen Book Award, finalist
- Golden Duck Award, finalist

== See also ==
- The Shadow Speaker
