= LaGuardia (comics) =

Science fiction comic book

Publication information
- Publisher: Berger Books/Dark Horse Comics
- Schedule: Monthly
- Format: Limited series
- Genre: Science fiction
- Publication date: December 2018 – March 2019
- No. of issues: 4

Creative team
- Written by: Nnedi Okorafor
- Artist(s): Tana Ford
- Letterer(s): Sal Sipriano
- Colorist(s): James Devlin

Collected editions
- LaGuardia: ISBN 978-1506710754
- LaGuardia Deluxe Edition: ISBN 978-1506728599

LaGuardia is a four-issue Africanfuturist comic book limited series by Nigerian-American writer Nnedi Okorafor and artist Tana Ford. The series was published by Dark Horse Comics imprint Berger Books from December 2018–March 2019, when it was also reprinted in a collected trade paperback format.

The series takes place in the same universe as Okorafor's Lagoon and Binti trilogy. The story was inspired by Okorafor's own experience with TSA at LaGuardia Airport. In 2020, the collected trade won an Eisner Award and a Hugo Award.

== Plot ==
Characters

- Future Nwafor Chukwuebuka
- Letme Live
- Citizen Raphael Nwabara
- Future Citizen Lives Chukwebuka

== Reception ==
The comic series was well received by critics scoring an average rating of 9.2 for the entire series based on 13 critic reviews aggregated by Comic Book Roundup. It received a starred review from Library Journal where Michael Dudley praised the glowing colors and found that although the characters were not subtle, the real-world story of the problems faced by immigrants was "both humanist and hopeful." Publishers Weekly called the art "wittily illustrated" and also found the colors vivid, ultimately comparing it to the best sci-fi for the story's handling of contemporary debates on immigration policy.

=== Accolades ===
In July 2020, the collected book won the Eisner Award for Best Graphic Album: Reprint, and shortly afterwards won the Hugo Award for Best Graphic Story in August 2020.

== Collected editions ==
| Title | Material collected | Publication date | ISBN |
|---|---|---|---|
| LaGuardia | LaGuardia #1-4, artist sketches, and author's afterword | July 2019 | 978-1506710754 |
| LaGuardia Deluxe Edition | LaGuardia #1-4, script chapter, new art and cover, creation process descriptions and art | February 2022 | 978-1506728599 |
