= Nnedi Okorafor =

Nigerian American writer of science fiction and fantasy (born 1974)

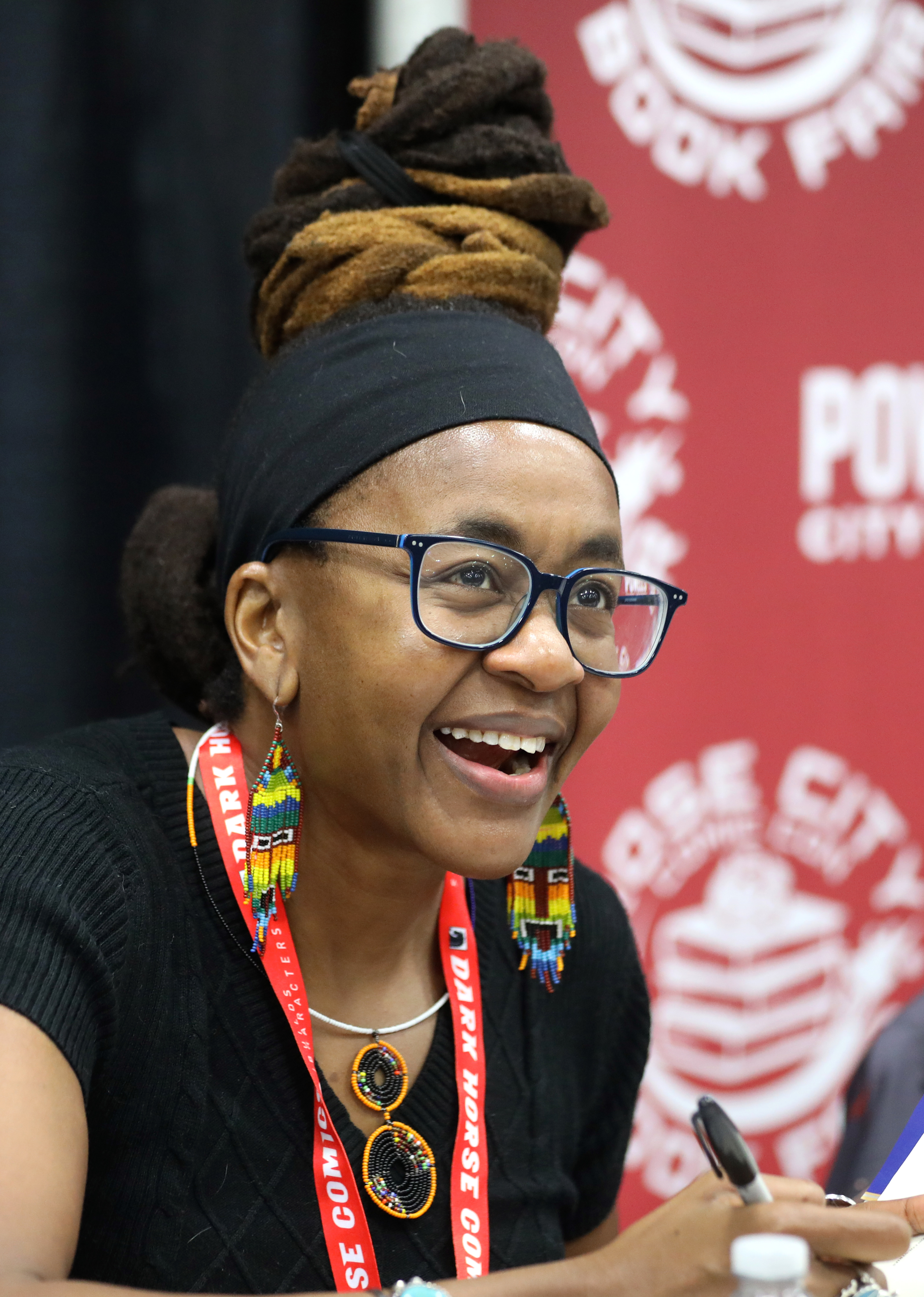
- Okorafor signing books in 2024
- Born: Nnedimma Nkemdili Okorafor; April 8, 1974 (age 52); Cincinnati, Ohio, U.S.
- Education: University of Illinois, Urbana-Champaign (BA); Michigan State University (MA); University of Illinois, Chicago (MA, PhD)
- Occupations: Writer, professor
- Children: 1
- Writing career
- Genres: Science fiction, Africanfuturism, fantasy, Africanjujuism, solarpunk
- Notable awards: Wole Soyinka Prize for Literature in Africa; World Fantasy Award for Best Novel; Nebula Award for Best Novella; Hugo Award for Best Novella; Eisner Award for Best Graphic Album – Reprint; Lodestar Award; Locus Award for Best Young Adult Novel; Carl Brandon Parallax Award
- Website: nnedi.com

Nnedimma Nkemdili "Nnedi" Okorafor (Note: Igbo pronunciation) (formerly Okorafor-Mbachu; born April 8, 1974) is a Nigerian American writer of science fiction and fantasy for both children and adults. She is best known for her Binti Series and her novels Who Fears Death, Zahrah the Windseeker, Akata Witch, Akata Warrior, Lagoon and Remote Control. She has also written for comics and film.

Her writing is Africanfuturism and Africanjujuism, both terms she coined and is heavily influenced by her dual Nigerian and American heritage. She is the recipient of multiple awards, including the Hugo Award, Nebula Award, Eisner Award and World Fantasy Award. She is considered to be among the third generation of Nigerian writers. Okorafor was inducted by the Museum of Pop Culture into the Science Fiction Hall of Fame in 2024.

== Background and personal life ==
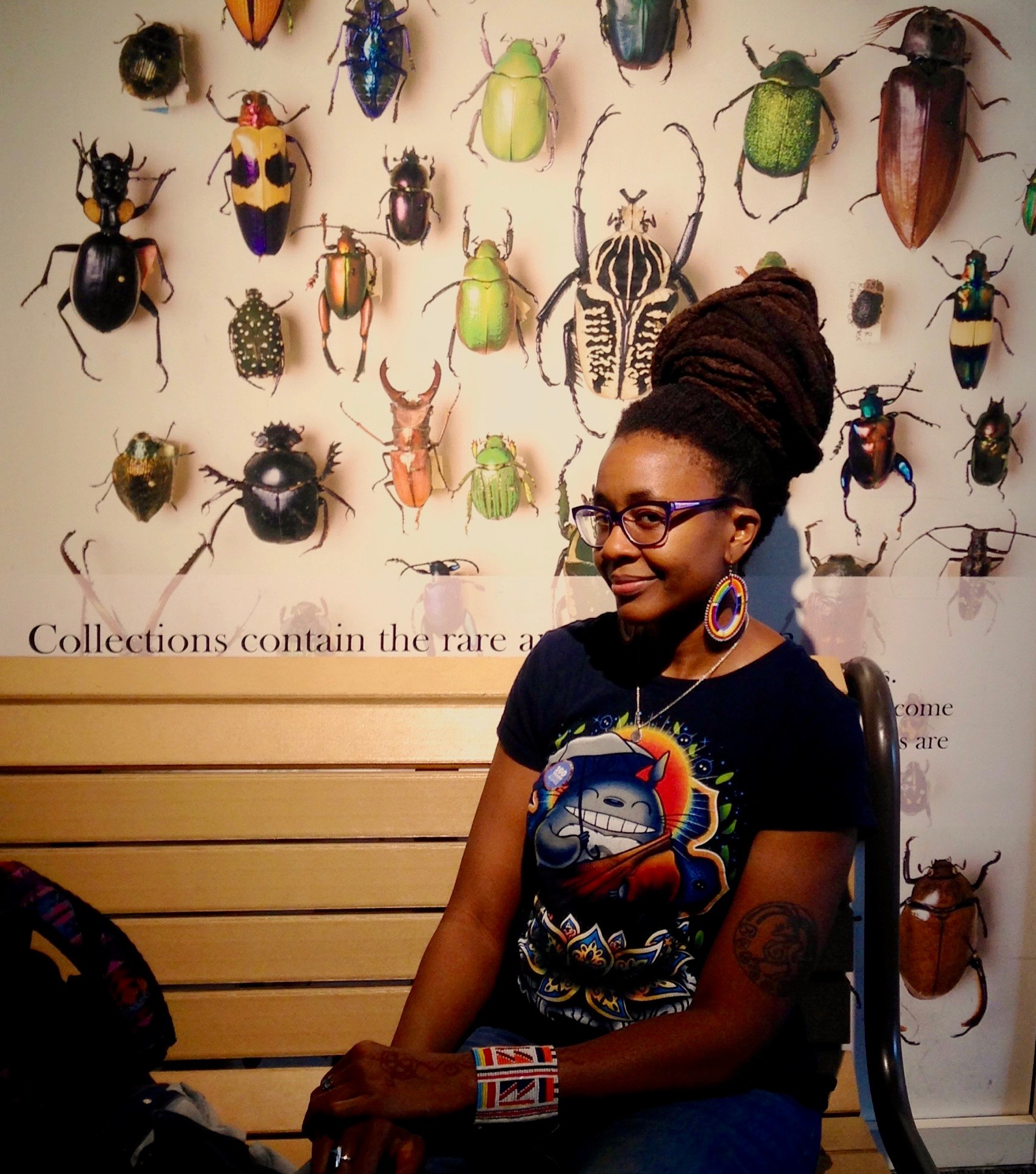
Okorafor in 2017

Nnedimma Nkemdili Okorafor was born in Cincinnati, Ohio, in 1974 to Igbo Nigerian parents who travelled to America in 1969 to attend school but could not return to Nigeria due to the Nigerian Civil War. She holds both American and Nigerian citizenships.

Okorafor is the third child in a family of four children and she grew up in Chicago, Illinois, often travelling to Nigeria to spend holidays with her extended family. Her first name is Igbo for "mother is good".

During her years attending Homewood-Flossmoor High School in Flossmoor, Illinois, Okorafor was a nationally known tennis and track star and excelled in math and the sciences. She wanted to be an entomologist.

She was diagnosed with scoliosis at the age of 13, a condition that worsened as she grew older. At age 19, she underwent spinal fusion surgery to straighten and fuse her spine; a rare complication led to Okorafor becoming paralyzed from the waist down.

Okorafor turned to writing small stories in the margins of a science-fiction book that she had. It was the first time she had ever written anything creatively. That summer, with intense physical therapy, Okorafor regained her ability to walk with a cane, but she was unable to continue her athletic career. At the suggestion of a friend, she took a creative writing class that spring semester and was writing her first novel by the semester's end.

She completed her college education at the University of Illinois at Urbana-Champaign, before obtaining a master's degree in journalism from Michigan State University and a master's degree and PhD in English from the University of Illinois, Chicago. She is a 2001 graduate of the Clarion Writers Workshop in Lansing, Michigan. Okorafor served as an associate professor at Chicago State University from 2008 to 2014 and at the State University of New York at Buffalo from 2014 to 2017. In 2021, Okorafor became a professor of practice at Arizona State University, where she became a member of the school’s Interplanetary Initiative. She currently lives in Phoenix, Arizona with her family.

== Work ==
=== Short stories ===
Okorafor received a 2001 Hurston-Wright literary award for her story "Amphibious Green". Okorafor's short stories have been published in anthologies and magazines, including Dark Matter: Reading The Bones, Enkare Review, Strange Horizons, Moondance magazine, The Dark Magazine and Writers of the Future Volume XVIII. A collection of her stories, titled Kabu Kabu, was published by Prime Books in 2013. It includes the titular piece, co-authored by Alan Dean Foster, six other previously unpublished short stories, and 14 stories that had been previously published in other venues since 2001, with a foreword by Whoopi Goldberg.

=== Novels and novellas ===
After her 2001 Hurston-Wright award, she published two acclaimed books for young adults, her debut novel Zahrah the Windseeker (Houghton Mifflin Harcourt) and The Shadow Speaker (Hyperion/Disney Book Group). The Shadow Speaker was a winner of the Carl Brandon Parallax Award, a Booksense Pick for Winter 2007/2008, a Tiptree Honor Book, a finalist for the Essence Magazine Literary Award, the Andre Norton Award and the Golden Duck Award, and an NAACP Image Award nominee. Her children's book, Long Juju Man, was the 2007–08 winner of the Macmillan Writer's Prize for Africa.

Okorafor's first adult novel, Who Fears Death (DAW/Penguin Books), won the 2011 World Fantasy Award for Best Novel, and was nominated for the 2010 Nebula Award. The prequel The Book of Phoenix won the 2018 Kurd Laßwitz Award and was a finalist for the Arthur C. Clarke Award.

In 2011, she returned to young adult with Akata Witch (Viking/Penguin), the first book in the Nsibidi Scripts Series, which was a Junior Library Guild Selection. The sequel, Akata Warrior, went on to win the 2018 Locus Award for Best Young Adult Book.

Okorafor's science-fiction novel Lagoon was a finalist for a British Science Fiction Association Award (Best Novel), a Red Tentacle Award (Best Novel), and a Tiptree Honor Book.

The Binti trilogy began with the 2015 novella Binti. This was followed by Binti: Home, published in 2017, and Binti: The Night Masquerade, published in 2018. Binti won both the 2015 Nebula Award and 2016 Hugo Award for best novella, and was a finalist for a British Science Fiction Association Award (Best Short) and BooktubeSFF Award (Best Short Work). Binti: Home and Binti: The Night Masquerade both received Hugo nominations for best novella in 2018 and 2019, respectively.

Also in 2016, the United Bank for Africa, a Nigerian bank, partnered with Cassava Republic Press to distribute 24,000 copies of Okorafor's novel Akata Witch in nine African countries.

In 2020, Okorafor released her middle grade novel Ikenga, which was nominated for the Edgar Award.

Okorafor's science fiction novella Remote Control, set in a near-future Ghana, was published in January 2021. Her adult novel Noor, set in a futurist northern Nigeria, was released in November 2021.

In January 2022, Okorafor's Akata Woman, the third novel in the Nsibidi Scripts Series, was released. Following the release of the novel, the series debuted on The New York Times Best Seller list.

In 2023, a deluxe revised edition of Okorafor's novel The Shadow Speaker, which was previously out of print, was published by DAW Books under the title Shadow Speaker. It was followed by a sequel; Like Thunder.

Also in 2023, Okorafor announced her novella trilogy She Who Knows which would serve as a prequel and sequel to her 2010 novel Who Fears Death and would focus on the life of Najeeba, Onyesonwu's mother. The first novella was released in August 2024.

Okorafor's most recent metafiction novel Death of the Author was released in January 2025. The novel previously titled The Africanfuturist was purchased in a seven-figure deal by William Morrow imprint of HarperCollins.

=== Adaptations ===
In February 2017, Okorafor announced via Facebook that her science-meets-witchcraft short story "Hello, Moto" had been optioned by Nigerian production company Fiery Film. The story was adapted into a short film, titled Hello, Rain by filmmaker C. J. Obasi. The story tells the tale of a woman who discovers that she can merge witchcraft and technology when she creates wigs for herself and her friends that allow them to wield influence and power, to help battle corruption. Instead, she watches her friends themselves become corrupted. A teaser was released in January 2018. Hello, Rain had its world premiere at the International Short Film Festival Oberhausen on May 6, 2018.

In July 2017, Okorafor announced via Twitter that Who Fears Death had been picked up by HBO to become a television series, with novelist and Game of Thrones producer George R. R. Martin joining the project as an executive producer. Okorafor will remain involved with the project as a consultant. In January 2021, it was announced that Tessa Thompson's newly formed production company, Viva Maude, had joined the team.

In April 2019, it was announced that Okorafor would co-write the screenplay of an adaptation of Octavia Butler's Wild Seed with filmmaker Wanuri Kahiu for Amazon Prime Video and reportedly will be produced by Viola Davis.

In January 2020, it was announced that Okorafor would co-write the screenplay of an adaptation of her Binti trilogy for Hulu with writer Stacy Osei-Kuffour.

In 2024, an adaptation of Okorafor's novel Lagoon is in early development at Amblin Entertainment.

=== Other work ===
In 2005, Okorafor wrote and published her first play, Full Moon. The Buxville Theater Company in Chicago helped produce this full-length theatrical work.

In 2009, Okorafor donated her archive to the Science Fiction and Fantasy Writers of America (SFWA) Collection of the Department of Rare Books and Special Collections at the Northern Illinois University Library.

Okorafor was the Young Adult Author special Guest of Honor at Detcon1, the 2014 North American Science Fiction Convention; Detcon1 was putting special emphasis on YA science fiction.

She spoke at the TEDGlobal conference in Arusha, Tanzania, in August 2017.

In October 2017, Okorafor announced via Twitter she would be writing three issues for Marvel's Black Panther comic, picking up where author Ta-Nehisi Coates left off. The first issue of Black Panther: Long Live the King was released in December 2017. A month earlier, a short comic of hers titled "Blessing in Disguise" was included in Marvel's Venomverse War Stories No. 1, inspired by the 2014 Boko Haram kidnapping of more than 200 Nigerian girls. In March 2017, it was announced that she would return to writing derived from the Black Panther, in Wakanda Forever, where the Dora Milaje team-up with Spider-Man, the X-Men and the Avengers. In July 2018, it announced that Okorafor would write a solo title focused on Black Panther's sister, Shuri.

Broken Places & Outer Spaces, Okorafor's first non-fiction title, was published by Simon & Schuster in 2019.

Okorafor contributed the essay "Zula of the fourth-grade playground" to the 2019 anthology New Daughters of Africa, edited by Margaret Busby.

In 2018, her comic book limited series LaGuardia was published by Berger Books. In 2020, the collected trade won an Eisner Award and a Hugo Award.

In 2025, Okorafor was the guest editor for The Best American Science Fiction and Fantasy 2025 anthology, working with series editor John Joseph Adams. The anthology was a finalist for the 2026 Locus Award for Best Anthology.

== Influences and themes ==
Okorafor's novels and stories reflect both her West African heritage and her American life. Rather than identifying as Nigerian-American, she refers to herself as "Naijamerican" and explains the importance of her dual heritage during a 2016 NPR interview:

That's very much a part of my identity, and it's also very much a reason why I think I ended up writing science fiction and fantasy because I live on these borders – and these borders that allow me to see from multiple perspectives and kind of take things in and then kind of process certain ideas and certain stories in a unique way. And that has led me to write this strange fiction that I write, which really isn't that strange if you really look at it through a sort of skewed lens.

Okorafor noticed how the fantasy and science fiction genre contain little diversity, and that was her motivation for writing books of these genres set in Africa. She wanted to include more people of color and create stories with Africa as the setting because so few stories were set there. She wrote her first story as a college sophomore and made the setting of her story Nigeria. Her stories place black girls in important roles that are usually given to white characters. Okorafor cites Nigeria as "her muse" as she is heavily influenced by Nigerian folklore and its rich mythology and mysticism.

Gary K. Wolfe wrote of her work: "Okorafor's genius has been to find the iconic images and traditions of African culture, mostly Nigerian and often Igbo, and tweak them just enough to become a seamless part of her vocabulary of fantastika."

Her work often looks at "weighty social issues: racial and gender inequality, political violence, the destruction of the environment, genocide and corruption" through "the framework of fantasy".

Okorafor shares that while the themes of her stories are often multi-layered, they are always grounded in "stories of the women and girls around me and also within myself".

Okorafor asserts that her work and parental responsibility relate to each other because "writing and being a mother are a part of me, so they are mixed together and balance each other out."

As of 2019, she began strongly rejecting the term "afrofuturism" as a label for her work and coined the terms africanfuturism and africanjujuism instead. In October 2019, she published an essay titled "Defining Africanfuturism" that defines both terms in detail.

== World Fantasy Award ==
Shortly after winning the World Fantasy Award in 2011, Okorafor published an essay "Lovecraft's racism & The World Fantasy Award statuette, with comments from China Miéville", in which she reflected upon her conflicting emotions on winning an award in the shape of a large silver bust of H. P. Lovecraft. She would later voice her support for Daniel José Older's 2014 petition to replace the Lovecraft bust with one of Octavia Butler. In the essay, she acknowledges both the literary legacy of Lovecraft and his continued influence in the contemporary world of science fiction:

Do I want "The Howard" (the nickname for the World Fantasy Award statuette. Lovecraft's full name is "Howard Phillips Lovecraft") replaced with the head of some other great writer? Maybe. Maybe it's about that time. Maybe not. What I know I want is to face the history of this leg of literature rather than put it aside or bury it. If this is how some of the great minds of speculative fiction felt, then let's deal with that ... as opposed to never mention it or explain it away.

== Awards ==
=== Awards for prose ===
Fiction and non-fiction
Year	Work	Award	Category	Result	Ref.
2005	"The Magical Negro"	Theodore Sturgeon Award	—	Finalist	
2006	Zahrah the Windseeker	Carl Brandon Award	Parallax Award (Note: For works written by a person of color)	Finalist	
2006	Zahrah the Windseeker	Carl Brandon Award	Kindred Award (Note: For works dealing with race or ethnicity)	Finalist	
2007	The Shadow Speaker	Andre Norton Award	—	Nominated	
2007	The Shadow Speaker	Otherwise Award (Note: Then known as the Tiptree Award)	—	Honor List	
2008	The Shadow Speaker	Carl Brandon Award	Parallax Award	Won	
2008	The Shadow Speaker	Locus Award	Young Adult Book	Finalist	
2009	"Spider the Artist"	WSFA Small Press Award	—	Finalist	
2010	Who Fears Death	Nebula Award	Novel	Nominated	
2010	Who Fears Death	Otherwise Award	—	Honor List	
2011	Akata Witch	Andre Norton Award	—	Nominated	
2011	Who Fears Death	Locus Award	Fantasy Novel	Finalist	
2011	Who Fears Death	World Fantasy Award	Novel	Won	
2012	Who Fears Death	Carl Brandon Award	Kindred Award	Won	
2014	Kabu Kabu	Locus Award	Collection	Finalist	
2014	Lagoon	BSFA Award	Novel	Finalist	
2014	Lagoon	Otherwise Award	—	Honor List	
2015	Binti	BSFA Award	Short Story	Shortlisted	
2015	Binti	Nebula Award	Novella	Won	
2016	Binti	British Fantasy Award	Novella	Shortlisted	
2016	Binti	Hugo Award	Novella	Won	
2016	Binti	Locus Award	Novella	Finalist	
2016	The Book of Phoenix	Arthur C. Clarke Award	—	Finalist	
2016	The Book of Phoenix	John W. Campbell Memorial Award	—	Finalist	
2017	"Afrofuturist 419"	Locus Award	Short Story	Finalist	
2017	Binti	Nommo Award	Novella	Won	
2018	Akata Warrior	Locus Award	Young Adult Book	Won	
2018	Akata Warrior	Lodestar Award	—	Won	
2018	Akata Warrior	Nommo Award	Novel	Finalist	
2018	Binti: Home	Hugo Award	Novella	Finalist	
2018	Binti: Home	Locus Award	Novella	Finalist	
2018	Binti: Home	Nommo Award	Novella	Finalist	
2018	The Book of Phoenix	Kurd Laßwitz Award	Foreign Novel	Won	
2019	Binti	Ignotus Award	Foreign Short Story	Won	
2019	Binti: The Night Masquerade	British Fantasy Award	Novella	Finalist	
2019	Binti: The Night Masquerade	Hugo Award	Novella	Finalist	
2019	Binti: The Night Masquerade	Nommo Award	Novella	Finalist	
2019	"Mother of Invention"	Locus Award	Short Story	Finalist	
2020	Binti: Sacred Fire	Locus Award	Novelette	Finalist	
2020	Broken Places & Outer Spaces: Finding Creativity in the Unexpected	Locus Award	Non-fiction	Finalist	
2022	Akata Woman	Dragon Award	Young Adult / Middle Grade	Nominated	
2022	"The Black Pages"	Locus Award	Novelette	Finalist	
2022	Noor	Locus Award	Science Fiction Novel	Finalist	
2022	Remote Control	Locus Award	Novella	Finalist	
2023	Akata Woman	Lodestar Award	—	Won	
2025	Death of the Author	Los Angeles Times Book Prize	Science Fiction, Fantasy, and Speculative Fiction	Finalist	
2025	Death of the Author	Nebula Award	Novel	Finalist	
2026	Death of the Author	Goldsboro Books Glass Bell Award	Outstanding Work of Contemporary - Fiction	Pending	
2026	Death of the Author	Hugo Award	Novel	Finalist	
2026	Death of the Author	Locus Award	Science Fiction Novel	Won	
2026	Death of the Author	NAACP Image Award	Literary Work - Fiction	Won	
2026	Death of the Author	Nommo Award	Best Novel	Pending	
2026	One Way Witch	Nommo Award	Best Novella	Pending	

=== Comics ===
Year	Work	Award	Category	Result	Ref.
2019	Black Panther: Long Live the King (issues 1-3)	Hugo Award	Graphic Story	Finalist	
2019	Black Panther: Long Live the King (issues 1-3)	Nommo Award	Graphic Novel	Finalist	
2019	Shuri	Nommo Award	Graphic Novel	Won	
2020	LaGuardia	Eisner Award	Best Graphic Album- Reprint	Won	
2020	LaGuardia	Hugo Award	Graphic Story	Won	
2026	The Space Cat	Hugo Award	Graphic Story	Finalist	
2026	The Space Cat	Locus Award	Illustrated and Art Book	Won	

=== Other awards ===
- 2005 – The Strange Horizons Reader's Choice Award for Stephen King's Super-Duper Magical Negroes
- 2007–2008 – Macmillan Writers' Prize for Africa for Long Juju Man
- 2008 – Wole Soyinka Prize for Literature in Africa for Zahrah the Windseeker
- 2012 – Black Excellence Award for Outstanding Achievement in Literature (Fiction) for Zahrah the Windseeker
- 2015 – African Literary Person of the Year from Brittle Paper
- 2016 – Children's Africana Book Award for Best Book for Young Readers for Chicken in the Kitchen
- Mathical Honors for Binti

== Bibliography ==
=== Children ===
- Long Juju Man (2009, Macmillan Africa)
- Iridessa and the Secret of the Never Mine (2012, Disney Books)
- Chicken in the Kitchen (2020, Lantana publishing)

=== Young adult ===
- Zahrah the Windseeker (2005, Houghton Mifflin Harcourt; paperback 2008, Graphia/Houghton Mifflin Harcourt)—writing as Nnedi Okorafor-Mbachu
- Ikenga (2020, Viking/Penguin/PRH)
- The Desert Magician Duology
  - The Shadow Speaker (2007, Hyperion/Disney)—writing as Nnedi Okorafor-Mbachu
  - Like Thunder (2023, DAW/Astra/PRH)
- Nsibidi Script Series
  - Akata Witch (2011, Viking/Penguin) (published as What Sunny Saw in the Flames in Nigeria and the UK by Cassava Republic Press)
  - Akata Warrior (2017, Viking/Penguin/PRH) (published as Sunny and the Mysteries of Osisi in Nigeria and the UK by Cassava Republic Press)
  - Akata Woman (2022, Viking/Penguin/PRH)

=== Adult ===
- "Hello, Moto" (2011, Tor.com)
- Kabu Kabu (2013, Prime Books)
- Lagoon (2014, Hodder & Stoughton Ltd.) (2015, Saga Press/Simon & Schuster)
- Broken Places & Outer Spaces: Finding Creativity in the Unexpected (TED Books) (2019, TED/Simon & Schuster)
- Remote Control (2021, Tor.com)
- Noor (2021, DAW/Penguin/PRH)
- Death of the Author (2025, William Morrow/HarperCollins)
- Who Fears Death
  - Who Fears Death (2010, DAW/Penguin)
  - The Book of Phoenix (2015, DAW/Penguin/PRH)
  - She Who Knows (2024, DAW/Astra/PRH)
  - One Way Witch (2025, DAW/Astra/PRH)
  - The Daughter Who Remains (February 2026, Astra)
- Binti Trilogy
  - Binti (2015, Tor.com)
  - Binti: Home (2017, Tor.com)
  - Binti: The Night Masquerade (2018, Tor.com)

=== Comics ===
- Black Panther: Long Live the King (2017, Marvel)
- LaGuardia (2018, Dark Horse)
- Shuri (2018, Marvel)
- Wakanda Forever (2018, Marvel)
- Antar: the Black Knight (2018, IDW/Mirage Films)
- Shuri: Wakanda Forever (2020, Marvel)
- After The Rain (2021, Abrams ComicArts – Megascope)
- The Space Cat (2025, First Second Books)

=== Short fiction ===
- The Palm Tree Bandit (Strange Horizons, December 2000)
- Crossroads (The Witching Hour Anthology, 2001)
- Windseekers (2002)
- Asuquo, or The Winds of Harmattan (2003)
- The Magical Negro (2004)
- When Scarabs Multiply (2004)
- Biafra (Margin Anthology of Magical Realism, 2005)
- Asunder (African Writer Online, 2007)
- The Popular Mechanic (2007)
- The Chaos Magician (2007)
- Spider the Artist (Seeds of Change Anthology, 2008)
- From the Lost Diary of TreeFrog7 (Clarkesworld #32, May 2009)
- On the Road (2009)
- Icon (2010)
- Tumaki (2010)
- The Go-Slow (Way of the Wizard Anthology, 2010)
- The Book of Phoenix (Excepted from the Great Book) (Clarkesworld #54, March 2011)
- Wahala (2011)
- How Nnedi Got Her Curved Spine (2012)
- The Baboon War (2012)
- The Chaos Magician's Mega Chemistry Set (Apex Magazine #36, May 2012)
- African Sunrise (Excerpted from The Great Book) (Subterranean Press, 2012)
- Moom! ( "AfroSF: Science Fiction by African Writers", 2012)
- The Girl with the Magic Hands (Worldreader, 2013)
- Ozioma the Wicked (2013)
- Bakasi Man (2013)
- "It's War" short story in "Long Hidden: Speculative Fiction from the Margins of History" (2014, Crossed Genres)
- "Poison Fish" (2014, read by the author as part of the "After Water" series on WBEZ)
- Showlogo (2014)
- "Sunrise" in Africanfuturism: An Anthology (2020, Brittle Paper)
- Sankofa (Decision Points Anthology, 2016)
- Rusties (2016) with Wanuri Kahiu (Clarkesworld #121, October 2016)
- Africanfuturist 419 (Clarkesworld #122, November 2016)
- History (2017)
- Mother of Invention (Slate, February 2018)
- The Heart of the Matter (2018)
- The Black Pages (Black Stars, Amazon Original Stories 2021)
- Just Out of Jupiter's Reach (The Far Reaches collection, 2023)
- Stones (Clarkesworld, September 2023)
- Dark Home (Out There Screaming anthology by Jordan Peele, 2023)

=== Critical studies and reviews of Okorafor's work ===
- Chow-Quesada, Emily (Fall 2024). "The detectives who kill : Black female detectives in the work of Oyinkan Braithwaite and Nnedi Okorafor". Clues. 42 (2): 98–109.
- Gellar-Goad, T. H. M. (2024). Masks, pp. 89–91, 137, 173. Tangent/punctum books.

=== As editor ===
- Nnedi Okorafor; John Joseph Adams, eds. (2025). The Best American Science Fiction and Fantasy 2025. Mariner Books. ISBN 9780063441477.

== Selected filmography ==
- Brave New Souls: Black Sci-Fi & Fantasy Writers of the 21st Century (2013) – Herself
- Ada Twist, Scientist (Season 4, Episode 19) — Alex Akerele
