= Jimi Tenor =

Finnish musician

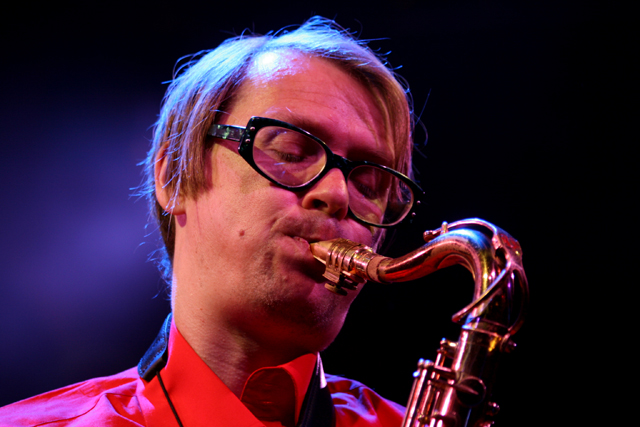
Jimi Tenor

Jimi Tenor (born Lassi O. T. Lehto, 1965) is a Finnish composer and a musician. His artist name is a combination of an instrument and a childhood nickname: the girls next door called him Jimi because of a likeness to Jimmy Osmond. Jimi Tenor found that irritating, but the name stuck for life. The last name comes from tenor saxophone, which is Tenor's main instrument.

== Music ==
Tenor started his career in Jimi Tenor & His Shamans playing industrial music. The group was inspired by the Italian futurist Luigi Russolo, Japanese drumming ensembles and industrial noise music. His band Jimi Tenor & His Shamans released its first album in 1988.

Having disbanded Jimi Tenor And His Shamans, the artist embarked on a solo career in the early 1990s, recording his debut work "Sähkomies" on rudimentary equipment in a small New York apartment. The album was released in 1994 on the Finnish imprint Sähko that also issued Tenor's sophomore work "Europa" a year later, expanding on the ideas articulated on the first disc.

On the back of a performance at the Love Parade in Berlin, Jimi Tenor scored his first hit with "Take Me Baby", entering the charts and signing a deal with the seminal electronic label Warp Records. Three albums were released on Warp: "Intervision" (1997), "Organism" (1999) and "Out Of Nowhere" (2000).

2003 Jimi Tenor Big Band toured around Europe playing more than 50 gigs in one stretch. Jimi Tenor has since collaborated with Umo Jazz Orchestra, Tv and Radio Orchestra of Croatia, Dachau Big Band, Metropole Orkest and with the avant-garde big band Flat Earth Society.

2011 Jimi Tenor made an album with Tony Allen called "Inspiration Information". After the release Jimi Tenor and Tony Allen toured extensively in Europe.

Jimi Tenor recorded three albums for Sähkö Recordings with a Berlin based Afrobeat band named "Kabukabu": "Joystone" (2007), "4th Dimension" (2008), and "The Mystery Of Aether for Kindered Spirits" (2012).

In 2009, he covered an Elektroids song for the Warp20 (Recreated) compilation album, as well as having his song "Paint the Stars" covered by Hudson Mohawke.

Blending jazz, synthesizer sounds, afrobeats and drum machine dubs, Jimi Tenor created a distinctive sound often resembling free-fowing, sporadic sketches, with a touch of the absurd.

As a soloist Jimi Tenor has appeared mostly as a flute player, also saxophone. Jimi Tenor does frequent guest appearances and has been featured on records of Nightmares on Wax, Malla and Dalindeo.

During his years composing, he has released albums on Sähkö Recordings, Warp Records, Kitty-Yo record labels, Philophon, Bureau-B and Timmion.

He has released more than 15 solo albums and collaboration albums with UMO Helsinki Jazz Orchestra, Tony Allen, Edward Vesala, Kabukabu, Freestyle Man, Jori Hulkkonen. Nicole Willis, Timmion Records (Soul Investigators), Maurice Fulton, Khan Of Finland, Lary 7, DJ Sotofett.

== Films ==
Jimi Tenor has filmed a science fiction film Nuntius with Jori Hulkkonen. As Tenor and Hulkkonen constantly change the script, it can only be seen as a live performance, since Hulkkonen and Tenor play the soundtrack live.

In "Sähkö the Movie", Jimi Tenor documented the early era of Sähkö records, Ilpo Väisänen, Keith McIvor (aka JD Twitch), Tommi Grönlund (founder of Sähkö records), and Mika Vainio.

== Life ==
Tenor was born in Lahti, Finland. He has talked in multiple interviews about his childhood and ski jumping with other children as a hobby. Jimi Tenor has lived in Berlin (1990), New York (1991-1994), London (1999-2000), Barcelona (1996-1999, 2001-2004) and Helsinki (2009-).

== Discography ==
=== Jimi Tenor Band ===
- Selenites, Selenites!; Digital/CD/LP (2025, Bureau B)

=== Jimi Tenor and his Shamans ===
- Total Capacity of 216,5 Litres; LP (1988, Euros)
- Diktafon; CD/LP (1989, Poko Records)
- Mekanoid; CD/LP (1990, Poko Records)
- Fear of a Black Jesus; CD/LP (1992, Bad Vugum)

=== Solo ===
- Sähkömies; Digital/CD/LP (1994, Sähkö Recordings)
- Europa; Digital/CD/LP (1995, Sähkö Recordings)
- Intervision; Digital/CD/LP (1997, Warp)
- Venera; EP/CD, (1998, Warp)
- Organism; Digital/CD/LP (1999 Warp/Sire Records)
- Out Of Nowhere; Digital/CD/LP (2000, Warp)
- Cosmic Relief; Digital/EP, (2001, Sähkö Recordings)
- Utopian Dream; Digital/CD/LP (2001, Sähkö Recordings)
- Higher Planes; Digital/CD/LP (2003, Kitty-Yo)
- Beyond The Stars; Digital/CD/LP (2004, Kitty-Yo)
- ReComposed by Jimi Tenor; Digital/CD/LP (2006, Deutsche Grammophon)
- Live in Berlin; Digital (2007, Kitty-Yo)
- Saxentric; Digital/CD/LP (2016, Herakles Records)
- Order of Nothingness; Digital/CD/LP (2018, Philophon)
- Metamorpha; Digital (2020, BubbleTease Communications)

=== With Abdissa Assefa ===
- Itetune; LP (2011, Temmikongi)

=== With Kabu Kabu ===
- Sunrise; EP/CD (2006, Sähkö Recordings)
- Joystone; Digital/CD/LP (2007, Sähkö Recordings)
- Mystery Spot; 7" (2008, Sahco Records)
- 4th Dimension; Digital/CD/LP (2009, Sähkö Recordings)
- Mystery of Aether; Digital/CD/LP (2012, Kindred Spirits)

=== With Tony Allen ===
- Inspiration Information Volume 4; Digital/CD/LP (2009, Strut Records)
- OTO Live Party; Digital/CD/LP (2018, Moog Recordings Library)

=== With Lary 7, Mia Teodoratus; Soft Focus ===
- Soft Focus; Digital/LP (2013, Sähkö Recordings)

=== With Nicole Willis; Cola & Jimmu ===
- Soul Makeover; as Nicole Willis, Digital/CD/LP (2000, Sähkö Recordings/Puu)
- Be It; as Nicole Willis, Digital/CD/LP (2004, Sähkö Recordings/Puu)
- Enigmatic; as Cola & Jimmu, Digital/CD/LP (2013, Herakles Records)
- I Give To You My Love And Devotion; as Cola & Jimmu, Digital/CD/LP (2014, Herakles Records)
- My Name Is Nicole Willis; as Nicole Willis & UMO Jazz Orchestra, Digital/CD/LP (2017, Persephone Records)

=== With Nicole Willis & The Soul Investigators (As also Jimmy Tenor) ===
- You Better Change/Raw Steaks; 7" (2003, Sahco Records)
- If This Ain't Love (Don't Know What Is)/Instrumental; 7"/Maxi/WL/CD (2005/2007, Timmion Records/Above The Clouds/Differ-Ant)
- Keep Reachin' Up; Digital/CD/LP/Cass (2005/2006/2007/2008, Timmion Records/Mit-Wit Records/P-Vine Records/Light In The Attic/Above The Clouds/Differ-Ant)
- My Four Leaf Clover/Holdin' On; 7" (2006, Timmion Records)
- Feeling Free/Instrumental; 7" (2006/2007, Timmion Records/Above The Clouds)
- Tell Me When/It's All Because Of You; 7" (2013, Timmion Records)
- Tortured Soul; Digital/CD/LP (2013, Timmion Records/P-Vine Records)
- Paint Me In A Corner/Where Are You Now; 7" (2015, Timmion Records)
- Happiness In Every Style; Digital/CD/LP (2015, Timmion Records)
- One In A Million/Instrumental; Digital/7" (2015, Timmion Records)
- Let's Communicate/Instrumental; 7" (2015, Timmion Records)

=== With Nicole Willis featuring Tony Allen ===
- All For You/Touching; 7" (2015, Sahco Records)

=== With Myron & E with The Soul Investigators ===
- Broadway; Digital/CD/LP (2013, Timmion Records)

=== With Willie West & The High Society Brothers ===
- Lost Soul; Digital/CD/LP (2014, Timmion Records)

=== With The Soul Investigators ===
- Vulture's Prayer/Bad Viberations; 7" (2015, Timmion Records)
- Soul Groove; Digital/CD/LP (2015, Timmion Records)

=== With UMO Jazz Orchestra ===
- Mysterium Magnum; Digital/CD/LP (2015, Herakles Records)
- My Name Is Nicole Willis; Digital/CD/LP (2017, Persephone Records)

=== With Tapani Rinne ===
- Suburban Sax; Digital/CD (1991, no label)
