= The Prey of Gods =

2017 novel by Nicky Drayden

- First edition
- Author: Nicky Drayden
- Audio read by: Prentice Onayemi
- Language: English
- Genre: Africanfuturism, science fiction
- Publisher: HarperCollins
- Publication date: 2017

The Prey of Gods is a 2017 young adult science fiction novel by Nicky Drayden. The audiobook was narrated by Prentice Anoyemi. It features characters who were queer, lesbian and gay.

== Plot summary ==
Set in South Africa in the year 2064, this Afrofuturist coming-of-age novel explores personal belief systems, sexual identity, and the importance of connection with others through the action-based trials of its many dynamic and nuanced characters. Godlike magical powers are awoken in teenager Muzi and 10-year-old Nomvula as they are both exposed to the drug "Godsend" and faced with traumatic events. They discover, fear, and revel in their powers in their own different ways. Meanwhile, spiteful demigoddess Sydney rises and focuses her power on targeting and recruiting other people with abilities to build an army to take over the world. Robots are caught in the middle, rising as aware beings, and the three sides collide in a battle of technology, awareness, and moral responsibility in a connected society.
