= Noor (novel) =

2021 novel by Nnedi Okorafor

- Cover for first edition
- Author: Nnedi Okorafor
- Language: English
- Genre: Africanfuturism, Science fiction
- Set in: Nigeria
- Publisher: DAW Books
- Publication date: November 9, 2021
- Publication place: Nigeria
- Media type: Print (hardcover)
- Pages: 224
- ISBN: 9780756416096 (first edition)

Noor is a 2021 Africanfuturist science fiction novel by Nigerian American author Nnedi Okorafor. The novel was published on November 9, 2021, by DAW Books and is the fourth adult novel written by Okorafor. It is a finalist for the Locus Award for best science fiction novel.

== Plot ==
A young disabled Igbo woman named Anwuli Okwudili, who goes by the codename AO (Autobionic Organism), lives in a futuristic Nigeria, where advanced technology has enabled her to upgrade unformed or weakened body parts with cybernetic prosthetics created by the megacorporation Ultimate Corp. AO lives as a mechanic in the capital city of Abuja. To the north, a great sandstorm called the "Red Eye" blows perpetually. After being attacked in a marketplace, AO fights back and ends up killing several men. Wanted for murder, she flees and encounters a Fulani herdsman named Dangote Nuhu Adamu, who goes by the name "DNA". Because he is also wanted for murder, DNA and AO flee together further north.

== Development ==
On Okorafor's birthday, she released a teaser photo of a completed manuscript for Noor which she had sent to her editor at DAW Books. In an interview with Bustle, she said that she had those who identify themselves as cyborgs in mind while writing Noor, and that the book is expected to promote people with disabilities in the speculative fiction scene.

== Themes ==
Noor focuses on a number of themes, including cybernetics, tradition, renewable energy, critiques of capitalism, gender identification, solarpunk ideology, and a futuristic retelling of the farmer-pastoralist conflict of Nigeria.

== Reception ==
Noor received starred reviews from Publishers Weekly and Kirkus Reviews. Kirkus Reviews called it "A searing techno-magical indictment of capitalism." Mahvesh Murad of Tor.com described it as "a book that takes a strong, clear stance against state surveillance and capitalist exploitation."
