= She Who Knows =

2024 novella by Nnedi Okorafor

- Author: Nnedi Okorafor
- Language: English
- Series: She Who Knows
- Release number: 1
- Genre: Fantasy
- Publisher: DAW Books
- Publication date: 20 August 2024
- Pages: 161 (Hardcover)
- ISBN: 9780756418953
- Followed by: One Way Witch

She Who Knows is a 2024 novella by Nnedi Okorafor. It takes place in the universe of Who Fears Death and tells the story of Najeeba, mother of that novel’s protagonist, Onyesonwu. She Who Knows is the first novella in a planned trilogy. It was followed by One Way Witch in 2025.

== Plot ==
In a frame story, Najeeba recounts her childhood to Aro.

Najeeba was born into an Osunu family. The Osunu are a subgroup of the Okeke ethnic group who worship the goddess Adoro and follow distinct customs. Osunu men mine salt for a living, selling it to other Okeke people in the salt markets. When Najeeba is thirteen, she hears The Call which tells her to travel the salt roads and begin mining salt. Even though salt mining is a task traditionally done by men, her father Xabief and brothers Ger and Rayan allow her to travel with them.

Najeeba interacts with a witch, which is described as either a tornado or dust devil. This encounter awakens her latent magical abilities. Najeeba visits a dead salt lake and assists her family with mining. At the salt market, she disguises herself as a boy and makes the largest profit her family has ever earned.

Over the next few years, Najeeba’s powers grow. She develops the ability to leave her body and travel the world. Her spirit often takes the form of a Kponyungo, a creature similar to a dragon or large flying lizard.

When she is sixteen, Najeeba’s father discovers a salt cube that glows from within with a mysterious pink light. Meanwhile, her village is attacked and its library is burned down. On the way to the salt market, the family is attacked by desert spirits. Najeeba takes the form of the Kponyungo to save them. Her father is injured, but survives. At the salt market, she sells the glowing cube for an enormous profit, but is unmasked as a young woman. She is attacked by jealous men, but uses her powers to defend herself.

When she returns to her hometown, the profit from the mysterious cube is enough to restore the library. However, her father dies soon afterwards. Najeeba quickly marries a man named Idris and moves away.

The narrative returns to the frame story. Najeeba asks Aro to train her in sorcery, and he agrees.

== Major themes ==
Noah Fram of BookPage wrote that She Who Knows "continues Okorafor’s exploration of why humans discriminate against one another." Fram wrote that Who Fears Death "analyzed the rot of internalized misogyny". In contrast, the prequel novella examines some forms of bigotry that are "less complicated." For example, women are allowed to purchase salt, but they are not allowed to mine or sell it. The review states that "[Najeeba's] family and her hometown perpetuate senseless, unthinking sexism because their lives and livelihoods depend on it." Fram states that Okorafor's central premise is thus: "Injustice persists because it is safe, and her heroes must have enough courage to change what must be changed, despite the dangers that will result."

Racheal Chie of Strange Horizons wrote that the novella explored the oppression of women. "Okorator uses witchcraft to highlight how much women of all kinds are misunderstood in society. If a man is smart, he is educated; but if a woman is smart, it is a source of suspicion—she is a witch." Another example of this theme occurs when Najeeba is accused of being a witch simply because she is good at selling salt in the market. Finally, a librarian controls the books that Najeeba is allowed to read. This is an example of one of several "time-honoured tools for policing women, meant to shame them into socially prescribed behaviour."

== Reception and awards ==
Noah Fram of BookPage praised the novella, writing that Okorafor's "writing is as direct and uncompromising as ever." The review concluded that "Najeeba’s story may be familiar to Okorafor’s fans, but it is no less inspiring, even for readers who already know how it ends." Gary K Wolfe of Locus called the novella "surprisingly intimate", praising the relationship between Najeeba and her father and brothers. Wolfe stated that the book was "eminently readable even to those unfamiliar with Who Fears Death."

The book was a finalist for the 2025 Locus Award for Best Novella.
