= Intervision (album) =

Studio album by Jimi Tenor
- Released: March 10, 1997
- Genre: Downtempo
- Length: 59:02
- Label: Warp
- Producer: Jimi Tenor

Jimi Tenor chronology
Europa (1995)	Intervision (1997)	Venera EP (1998)

Singles from Intervision
- 1. "Can't Stay with You Baby / Caravan" Released: 1996; 2. "Outta Space" Released: 1997; 3. "Sugardaddy / Take Me Baby" Released: 1997

Professional ratings
Review scores
Source	Rating
AllMusic	4/5 stars
Muzik	9/10
NME	8/10

Intervision is a studio album by Jimi Tenor. It was released through Warp in 1997. It peaked at number 39 on the Finnish Albums Chart.

== Critical reception ==
Sean Cooper of AllMusic stated that "Intervision blends fat organ leads with horns, raw and treated vocals, and rhythmic and percussive figures drawn from '60s and '70s soul, funk, fusion, and psychedelia, as well as contemporary house, downbeat, and techno." Johnny Cigarettes of the NME said that Tenor was "rarely self-indulgent, usually soulful, and always classy. Meanwhile, the blend of loungecore, aquatic techo, '70s soul and funk, plus a rich sense of eerie atmospherics make this album sound like some wildly intoxicating soundtrack to a film no-one would understand."

== Track listing ==
All tracks are written by Jimi Tenor, except "Caravan" by Duke Ellington, Irving Mills, and Juan Tizol.

No.	Title	Length
1.	"Outta Space"	6:25
2.	"Downtown"	4:09
3.	"Sugardaddy"	7:24
4.	"Never Say It Aloud"	5:27
5.	"Can't Stay with You Baby"	4:35
6.	"Tesla"	4:53
7.	"Caravan"	4:49
8.	"Wiping Out"	5:05
9.	"Shore Hotel"	4:23
10.	"Nobody's Perfect"	5:02
11.	"Atlantis"	6:50

== Personnel ==
Credits adapted from liner notes.

- Jimi Tenor – production
- Caroline Boaden – drums (1, 2, 10, 11)
- Ilkka Mattila – guitar (1, 8, 9)
- Marco Kosonen – trumpet (1, 8, 11)
- Tapani Rinne – baritone saxophone (1, 11)
- Jogi Kosonen – guitar (8)
- Tuomo Puranen – double bass (11)
- DED Associates – design
- Thron Ullberg – photography
- Wolfgang Mustain – photography

== Charts ==
Chart	Peak position
Finnish Albums (Suomen virallinen lista)	39
