= Akata Woman =

2022 fantasy novel by Nnedi Okorafor

- First edition
- Author: Nnedi Okorafor
- Audio read by: Nene Nwoko
- Illustrator: Designed by Jim Hoover
- Cover artist: Greg Ruth
- Language: English
- Series: The Nsibidi Scripts #3
- Genre: Young adult, fantasy
- Set in: Aba, Nigeria
- Publisher: Viking Books
- Publication date: January 18, 2022
- Publication place: United States
- Media type: Print, kindle, audio CD, audiobook
- Pages: 416 pp
- ISBN: 9780451480583 (hardcover 1st ed.)
- OCLC: 1246726914
- Dewey Decimal: 813.6
- LC Class: PZ7.O4157 An 2022
- Preceded by: Akata Warrior

Akata Woman is a 2022 young adult fantasy novel by Nigerian American author Nnedi Okorafor. It is the sequel to Akata Witch and Akata Warrior and the third book in her The Nsibidi Script series. It debuted on the New York Times Best Seller list following its release in January 2022.

== Plot ==
Set after the events of the second book, Sunny Nwazue, who discovered that she is a member of the all female Nimm Warriors, is tasked by Udide, a giant talking spider, to find and return a ghazal stolen by Chichi's mother. If she doesn't, she'll face terrible consequences. Sunny, Orlu, Chichi, and Sasha will have to travel across various settings—the spirit realm, Nimm village, and a parallel universe of plant-based technology—to stop Udide from wreaking havoc on the Nimm women.

== Reception ==
The book was ranked as one of the most anticipated book of January 2022 by several magazines and literary websites including Polygon, PopSugar, Book Riot and Tor.com. It received several positive receptions from reviewers upon release. In a starred review, Kirkus Reviews called the novel "An engrossing addition to a thoughtful coming-of-age series". Murad Mahvesh in a review for Tor.com noted that "The story zips along with plenty of fun twists and turns, scares and surprise, and as usual, Okorafor pulls no punches with current social commentary".
