= Ikenga (novel) =

2020 fantasy novel by Nnedi Okorafor

- Author: Nnedi Okorafor
- Audio read by: Ben Onwukwe
- Cover artist: Greg Ruth
- Language: English
- Genre: Fantasy
- Set in: Kaleria, Nigeria
- Published: 2020
- Publisher: Viking
- Publication date: August 18, 2020
- Publication place: Nigeria
- Pages: 240
- ISBN: 978-0-593-11352-3

Ikenga is a 2020 middle grade fantasy novel by Nigerian American writer Nnedi Okorafor. It is Okorafor's first book to feature male protagonist and was nominated for the 2021 Edgar Awards. The novel follows Nnamdi, a boy who can access superhuman powers with the help of the Ikenga.

== Background ==
Okorafor's stated that she started writing the novel's first draft in 2009 and based it on Nigerian mythology and the Igbo culture in reference to the Igbo god Ikenga.

== Plot summary ==
Set in Kaleria, a fictional town in contemporary Nigeria, Nnamdi's father who was a chief of police known for capturing criminals was murdered by an unknown group which is rumored to be the Chief of Chiefs and 12-year-old son Nnamdi vows to avenge him.

On the day of his father's memorial celebration, his father spirit soon appears to him and give him a gift of a small figurine known as Ikenga which can transform Nnamdi into a huge black figure with superhuman strength and rage, nicknamed The Man by Newspapers. With his newly found powers, he becomes a vigilante and takes out Kaleria's dangerous criminals including the Chiefs of Chiefs.

== Reception ==
The book received positive reactions with the New York Times praising Okorafor's characters. School Library Journal in a starred review stated that "this wonderfully fresh superhero origin story offers a look into the shadowy, inexplicable powers that are sudden bestowed in a child".

Kirkus Review noted it for being "a memorable middle grade murder mystery".

== Award and recognitions ==
- Nominated for the 2021 Edgar Award for Best Juvenile
- Amazon Best Children Book of 2020
- NPR Best Book of the Year
