= Moondance (magazine) =

Online women's literary magazine

Moondance is an online international women's literary, culture and art journal. The magazine began in 1996.

Said Editor-in-Chief Loretta Kemsley, "My background in newspaper design was a good start for our fledgling ezine but so very different from the demands and opportunities of Internet publishing. With little experience to guide us, that first edition was an adventure unto itself. Some of our volunteers doubted we could accomplish this feat, even as we worked hard to meet our self imposed deadline: September, 1996. Moondance was coded for web browsers while reading a book on simplified HTML,"

Journalist Loretta Kemsley of Los Angeles, creator and publisher for the magazine, began her media career in the mid-1950s as a young horsewoman and stunt rider for cowboy star Gene Autry through Flying A Productions studios in Hollywood. In June 1954, Kemsley rode as a stunt double, at the age of eight, for Nancy Gilbert who played the young Calamity in the Buffalo Bill, Jr. NBC series directed by George Archainbaud, starring Dick Jones as Buffalo Bill, Jr., the Marshall of Wileyville, Texas. Forty more episodes were later co-produced by Autry for the children's western from 1954–1956.

== History ==
"Moondance was an experiment without precedent when it began, but today is the role model for a variety of exciting new ezines. When we decided to publish Moondance, we searched the Internet for examples to emulate. None could be found. Starting from scratch, we used trial and error to devise the successful format which uses the best of print media design, combined with the expanded capabilities of online media, while remaining accessible to those with hardware and software limitations. Moondance is coded specifically for disabled access," said Kemsley about the magazine's creation.

Only three years after its beginning in 1999, Moondance received a UNESCO Web Prize Award, Category I (Free Themes). UNESCO - the United Nations Educational, Scientific and Cultural Organization was founded as a cultural wing of the United Nations in 1945. Created through the UNESCO prize for the promotion of the arts the UNESCO Web Prize Competition was awarded from 1997-2003 "in recognition of the growing cultural and societal importance of the new information and communication technologies."

"In March, 1998, we were honored when Moondance was presented by Ida Miro Kiss, a Hungarian feminist and renowned speaker, as an example of women networking on the Internet at the UNESCO Inter-governmental Conference, Stockholm, Sweden," said Kemsley.

Moondance is currently being used in many various university-level classroom curricula across the United States including University of Wisconsin–Madison, University of Maryland, Baltimore County, George Mason University and Akamai University of Hawaii among others. Mujeres University in Madrid, Spain has also used Moondance magazine in their English studies classroom curriculum since 1999. Today the American Political Science Association, a political science consortium of over 80 universities and higher education centers uses Moondance as a reference to enable a greater study and understanding of women's gender issues.

Past writers for Moondance include noted women journalists, poets, authors and novelists. These include Fulbright scholar Lucinda Nelson Dhavan, Hurston/Wright Award winner Nnedi Okorafor-Mbachu, Sonia Pressman Fuentes the 2000 U.S. Maryland Women's Hall of Fame winner and founder of NOW - the National Organization for Women and 2003 ABA - American Book Award winner Daniela Giseffi.

== Focus ==
Moondance editorial standards stay close to the themes of focusing on the interests, lives and international culture of women. Sections for the magazine include: Best of Theme, Columns, Fiction, Non-Fiction, Inspirations, Poetry, Art and Reviews. Since its beginning Moondance neither sells nor takes any advertising monies. Genres include literary and art criticism. Articles reflect the diversity of interests of international readers. A creative connection between cultures and a meeting of mind and soul is the object.

== Readership ==
Women's publication

Published bi-annually 1996-1997 / quarterly 1997-to present

2006 Readership - approx 187,000 readers per issue

Readership age: covers wide range (18–65 years of age)

Readership interests: feminism, women and culture, women specific stories and women's literary history

== Literary mention and awards ==
Moondance magazine chooses a "Best of Theme" writer among its sections for each of its quarterly editions. A Pushcart Prize nominee is also chosen annually from the collection of writers who submit material each year.

== See also ==
- List of literary magazines
