= Comic Republic =

Nigerian comic distributor

- Status: Active
- Founded: 2013
- Founder: Jide Martin
- Country of origin: Nigeria
- Headquarters location: Lekki, Nigeria
- Key people: Jide Martin, CEO; Wale Awelenje; Tobe Ezeogu; Michael Balogun; Deen Ipaye; Eduvie Martin; Toba Kalejaiye
- Official website: thecomicrepublic.com

Comic Republic is a Nigerian online multimedia company that primarily focuses on the digital distribution of indigenously created comic books. The company features African people, locales and mythology in much of its published body of work, although this is not an explicitly stated focus of the company. Comic Republic's flagship character is Guardian Prime.

On 23 November 2016, Comic Republic was featured as an African Startup by CNN. In 2021, Comic Republic signed a deal to produce a film adaptation of their comic Ireti.

In 2023, American television production studio Universal Content Productions (UCP) announced that a number of TV shows will be developed based on characters from Comic Republic’s “Vanguards.” .

== Titles ==
- Aje #1-5
- Amadioha #1-4
- Assegai #1-8
- Avonome #1-11
- Beatz #1-7
- Blade of the Blackbird #1
- Blackmoon #1-5
- Chibok #1
- Dead Republic #1-2
- Eru #1-9
- Galactic Core #1-10
- Go For Gold Nigeria
- Guardian Prime Genesis #1-4
- Hero Generation #1-8
- Hero Kekere #1-12
- Ireti Bidemi #1-8
- Ireti Moremi #1
- Itan #1-4
- Meme Friday #1-2
- MetaKnyts #0-9
- Metalla #1-4
- Might of Guardian Prime #1-10
- Ndoli #1-4
- Nneoma's Chronicles #1
- No False News Zone #1-3
- Presurrection #1-3
- Scion Immortal #1-4
- Tatashe #1-5
- Tear Sheet #1-7
- The Comic Republic Character Bible: Heroes
- The Comic Republic Character Bible: Villains
- Trials of the Spear #1-4
- Triple Kill #1-4
- Uhuru #1-3
- Vanguards #1-21
- Visionary #1-5
