= Kabu Kabu =

Short story collection by Nnedi Okorafor

- First edition
- Author: Nnedi Okorafor
- Audio read by: Yetide Badaki
- Language: English
- Genre: Speculative fiction, Africanfuturism, Africanjujuism
- Publisher: Prime Books
- Publication date: September 29, 2013
- Publication place: United States/ Nigeria
- Pages: 264

Kabu Kabu is a speculative fiction short story collection written by Nigerian American writer Nnedi Okorafor with stories in both Africanfuturism and Africanjujuism styles and themes. The collection was first published in 2013 by Prime Books.

== Background ==
The collection includes the titular piece, co-authored by Alan Dean Foster, six other previously unpublished short stories, and 14 stories that had been previously published in other venues since 2001; with a foreword by Whoopi Goldberg. The title "Kabu Kabu" is gotten from name of the non-registered illegal cab that operates in some part of Nigeria.

== Contents ==
- "The Magical Negro"
- "Kabu Kabu"
- "The House of Deformities"
- "The Black Stain"
- "How Inyang Got Her Wings"
- "On the Road"
- "Spider the Artist"
- "The Ghastly Bird"
- "The Winds of Harmattan"
- "Long Juju Man"
- "The Carpet"
- "Icon"
- "The Popular Mechanic"
- "Windseekers"
- "Bakasi Man"
- "The Baboon War"
- "Asunder"
- "Tumaki"
- "Biafra"
- "Moom!"
- "The Palm Tree Bandit"

== Reception ==
Publishers Weekly gave Kabu Kabu a starred review and said the stories were "worth reading again and again", later including it in its 2013 "Top 10: Science Fiction, Fantasy & Horror" books.

For Tor.com, Lee Mandelo praised Okorafor's storytelling, but called the collection more of a sampler of her writing that draws readers to her other related works rather than a stand-alone story.

Wole Talabi reviewed the book in Brittle Paper lamenting that it did not include more diverse tribal mythology of Nigeria, but overall commending the collection for making it clear that writers in the speculative fiction genre include Nigerians, Africans, and women—not just white men.

The audio performance read by Yetide Badaki was praised by Kat Hooper for the website Fantasy Literature, who also highlighted the African "settings, mythologies, folklore, food, flora, fauna, and other plot elements that are rarely seen in speculative fiction."

In a Strange Horizons review, however, Matthew Cheney felt that readers would better appreciate it instead as a sketchbook showing Okorafor working through her material, and that the book as a whole is much more interesting than any of its parts.

=== Accolades ===
In the 2014 Locus Award voting, the collection placed fourth in the Best Collection category. The audiobook release was also a finalist for the 2014 Audie Award in the Short Stories/Collections category.
