= Akata Witch =

2011 fantasy novel by Nnedi Okorafor

- First edition
- Author: Nnedi Okorafor
- Cover artist: Greg Ruth
- Language: English
- Series: Nsibidi Scripts Series
- Subject: Africanjujuism
- Genre: Fantasy; Young adult fiction
- Set in: Nigeria
- Published: 2011
- Publisher: Viking/Penguin Books
- Publication place: United States; Nigeria
- Pages: 349
- Followed by: Akata Warrior

Akata Witch (retitled What Sunny Saw in the Flames in Nigeria and the UK) is a 2011 young adult fantasy novel written by Nigerian American author Nnedi Okorafor. It was nominated for the Andre Norton Award and it is the first novel in her The Nsibidi Scripts series; it is followed by two sequels, Akata Warrior (2017) and Akata Woman (2022).

== Background ==
Nnedi Okorafor based the novel in Nigerian culture and politics, and African cosmology, folklore, and tradition to create many of the entities and spirits in the novel.

== Plot ==
Twelve-year-old Sunny Nwazue was born in America yet lives in Aba, Nigeria. She is Nigerian, Black and albino, and cannot go out in the sun for long periods because of her albinism.

Sunny discovers that she has magical abilities which makes her a "free agent" in the magical community called the Leopard People in West Africa. As a free agent, she needs to learn about the magical community. Her magical teachers connect her with three other magical students to become an Oha coven, a group of Leopard People assembled to pursue a purpose. The group is cultivated by leaders in the magical communities to try to capture Black Hat Otokoto, a Leopard serial killer.

== Characters ==
- Sunny Nwazue is an American-born Nigerian. Aged 12 and albino, Sunny loves to play soccer but is unable to spend long periods in the sun. Because of her pale skin and hair, people call her a witch.
- Orlu is Sunny's classmate at school and a "Leopard Person" his trait is that he can "undo things"
- Chichi is Orlu's friend who becomes close with Sunny. Chichi is very intelligent, she doesn't go to school.
- Sasha is another American-born Nigerian. He was sent to Nigeria by his parents as punishment for using his magic inappropriately.
- Black Hat Otokoto is the main antagonist of the novel. A powerful Leopard Person, he targets children for his rituals.

== Themes ==
The novel deals with themes of ethnicity, identity, and dealing with whatever gifts or curses life provides.

== Publication history ==
The novel was published as What Sunny Saw in the Flames in both Nigeria and the UK; akata has a derogatory meaning in Nigerian dialects. The original edition's title is meant to face and criticize its derogatory meaning.

== Reception ==
Kirkus Reviews called the novel "ebulliently original." The New York Times recommended it as one of "7 great fantasy novels for teenagers," saying that Okorafor "weaves an enchanting spell in this book and its sequel." The Los Angeles Times said "in an increasingly globalized world, Okorafor's outsider perspective offers a refreshing Afro take on the popular coming-of-age fantasy genre."

Time recognized the book as one of the 100 Best Fantasy Books of All Time, praising Okorafor's use of Nigerian folk beliefs and rituals.

Okorafor's Akata novels have been met with resistance among religious conservatives in Nigeria, who argue that the novels glorify superstition and witchcraft.

== Awards ==
Akata Witch received the following awards and accolades:

- 2019: American Library Association's (ALA) Top Ten Amazing Audiobooks for Young Adults
- 2012: Amelia Bloomer Book List
- 2012: ALA Best Fiction for Young Adults
- 2011: Shortlisted for the Andre Norton Award, a prize at the Nebula Award for Middle Grade and Young Adult Fiction

The novel was also named an Amazon.com best book of the year.

== Sequels ==
The novel was followed by two sequels; Akata Warrior (2017) and Akata Woman (2022).
