= Lagoon (novel) =

2014 africanfuturist novel by Nnedi Okorafor

- First edition
- Author: Nnedi Okorafor
- Cover artist: Joey Hi-Fi
- Language: English
- Genre: Science fiction
- Set in: Lagos, Nigeria, 2010
- Published: 2014
- Publisher: Hodder and Stoughton

Lagoon is an Africanfuturist first contact novel by Nnedi Okorafor (2014, Hodder & Stoughton; 2015, Saga Press/Simon & Schuster). It has drawn much scholarly attention since its publication, some of which was written before Okorafor's important clarification that her work is "Africanfuturist" rather than "Afrofuturist." In 2014 it was chosen as an honor list title for the James Tiptree Jr. Award.

Lagoon originated as a screenplay Okorafor wrote for Nollywood director Tchidi Chikere, after both were frustrated with "abysmal stereotyping" of Nigerians in the South African film District 9.

== Summary ==
According to Hugh Charles O'Connell:

Lagoon develops its ... narrative across three acts: "Welcome" (in which the aliens make contact with the people of Lagos), "Awakening" (an explosion of violence across the city after contact is made), and "Symbiosis" (a period of utopian transformation, in which the aliens and humans come together to form a new postcapitalist Nigeria). Across these three acts, the novel's primary plot revolves around the alien ambassador, Ayodele, and her interactions with three human protagonists: Adaora, a marine biologist; Agu, a Nigerian soldier; and Anthony, a Ghanaian hip-hop artist. Blending its SF topoi with fantasy and folklore elements, we learn that the three human protagonists have special abilities (Adaora can create a shield around herself and breathe underwater, Agu has superhuman strength, and Anthony can make his voice heard and understood at great distances). Alongside these fantastical powers, the novel also incorporates various Nigerian folkloric and mythical entities, which physically manifest themselves and interact with the material world after being awakened by the aliens in the second act. Such figures include Udide Okwanka, a trickster spider and master weaver of tales from Igbo folklore; Legba, the Yoruba trickster god of language and the crossroads who is recast as an expert 419 scammer, but who also shows up in spirit form as Papa Legba; and new figures such as the Bone Collector, a sentient stretch of the Lagos-Benin highway that attacks humans.

== Style ==
The narrative switches between many points of view, with scenes often centered on strong visuals. These stylistic features may be an echo of the novel's screenplay origins.
