= Carl Brandon Society =

The Carl Brandon Society is an organization originating within the science fiction community. Their mission "is to increase racial and ethnic diversity in the production of and audience for speculative fiction". Their vision is "a world in which speculative fiction, about complex and diverse cultures from writers of all backgrounds, is used to understand the present and model possible futures; and where people of color are full citizens in the community of imagination and progress".

The Society was founded in 1997 following discussions at the feminist science fiction convention WisCon 23 in Madison, Wisconsin. It was named after "Carl Brandon", a fictional black fan writer created in the mid-1950s by Terry Carr and Pete Graham. This also alludes to the James Tiptree, Jr. Award, named after the fictional male persona used by the writer long known as James Tiptree Jr.

The Society maintains annuals lists of fantastical works published by writers of color.

In 2023 the society was awarded a Special Locus Award for "Developing Diversity In Genre Communities".

== CBS Parallax and Kindred Awards ==
Inaugurated in 2005, the Carl Brandon Parallax Award is a juried award given to works of speculative fiction created by a self-identified person of color. The 2005 Parallax, the first to be awarded, went to Walter Mosley for his young adult novel 47.

Inaugurated in 2005, the Carl Brandon Kindred Award is a juried award given to any work of speculative fiction dealing with issues of race and ethnicity; nominees may be of any racial or ethnic group. The 2005 Kindred Award went to Susan Vaught for her young adult novel Stormwitch.

The awards were not given for years from 2012 to 2018, but resumed with awards for 2019.

Carl Brandon Parallax Award Shortlist for 2006

- Ashok Banker: "Prince of Ayodhya" (Penguin India)
- Tobias Buckell: "Toy Planes" (Nature, Oct. 13, 2005)
- Octavia E. Butler: "Fledgling" (Seven Stories Press)
- Daliso Chaponda: "Trees of Bone" (Apex Science Fiction and Horror Digest, #3)
- Marcia Douglas: "Marie-Ma" (Femspec, Vol. 6, #1)
- Hiromi Goto: "Nostalgia" (Nature, Sept. 1, 2005)
- N. K. Jemisin: "Cloud Dragon Skies" (Strange Horizons, Aug. 1, 2005)
- A. H. Jennings: "Owasa" (Farthing, July 2005)
- Alaya Dawn Johnson: "Shard of Glass" (Strange Horizons, Feb. 14, 2005)
- Ahmed Khan: "The Meaning of Life and Other Clichés" (Another Realm, March 2005)
- Gail Nyoka: Mella and the N'anga: An African Tale (Sumach Press)
- Nnedi Okorafor: Zahrah the Windseeker (Houghton Mifflin Harcourt)
- Nisi Shawl: "Wallamelon" (Aeon magazine, #3)
- Vandana Singh: "The Tetrahedron" (Intranova, March 15, 2005)

Carl Brandon Kindred Award Shortlist for 2006

- Tobias Buckell: "Toy Planes" (Nature, Oct. 13, 2005)
- Octavia E. Butler: Fledgling (Seven Stories Press)
- Daliso Chaponda: "Trees of Bone" (Apex Science Fiction and Horror Digest, #3)
- Marg Gilks: "Before the Altar on The Feast of All Souls" (Tesseracts 9)
- Walter Mosley: 47 (Little, Brown and Company)
- Nnedi Okorafor: Zahrah the Windseeker (Houghton Mifflin)
- Liz Williams: "La Gran Muerte" (Asimov's Science Fiction, April 2005)

The 2006 Carl Brandon Society Awards were presented during a ceremony at WisCon 30.

Carl Brandon Parallax Award Shortlist for 2007

- Nnedi Okorafor-Mbachu: "The Shadow Speaker"

Carl Brandon Kindred Award Shortlist for 2007

- Minister Faust: "From the Notebooks of Doctor Brain"

Carl Brandon Parallax Award Shortlist for 2008

- Vandana Singh: "Distances"

Carl Brandon Kindred Award Shortlist for 2008

- Tananarive Due: "Ghost Summer"

Carl Brandon Parallax Award Shortlist for 2009

- Hiromi Goto: "Half World"

Carl Brandon Kindred Award Shortlist for 2009

- Justine Larbalestier: "Lair"

Carl Brandon Parallax Award Shortlist for 2010

- Karen Lord: "Redemption in Indigo"

Carl Brandon Kindred Award Shortlist for 2010

- Nnedi Okorafor: "Who Fears Death"

Honor Shortlist for 2010

- N. K. Jemisin: "The Hundred Thousand Kingdoms"
- Anil Menon: "The Beast with Nine Billion Feet"
- Charles Yu: "Standard Loneliness Package"

Carl Brandon Parallax Award Shortlist for 2011

- Tenea D. Johnson: "Smoketown"

Carl Brandon Kindred Award Shortlist for 2011

- Andrea Hairston: "Redwood and Wildfire"

Honor Shortlist for 2011

- Zen Cho: "The House of Aunts"
- Zen Cho: "Rising Lion – The Lion Bows"
- Minister Faust: "The Alchemists of Kush"
- Tenea D. Johnson: "Revolution"
- Yoon Ha Lee: "Ghostweight"
- An Owomoyela: "All That Touches the Air"
- Nisi Shawl: "Black Betty"
- JoSelle Vanderhooft: "Steam-Powered: Lesbian Steampunk Stories"

The 2011 Carl Brandon Awards were presented at Arisia, January 17–20, in Boston MA, USA.

Through 2012–2018, the Carl Brandon Award ceremonies went on hiatus.

Carl Brandon Parallax Award Shortlist for 2019

- Akwaeke Emezi: "Pet"

Carl Brandon Kindred Award Shortlist for 2019

- Michele Tracy Berger: "Doll Seed"

Parallax Honor Shortlist for 2019

- Alex Jennings: "Mister Dog"
- Indrapramit Das: "Kali_Na"
- Jaymee Goh: "The Freedom of the Shifting Sea"
- Rebecca Roanhorse: "Harvest"
- Craig Laurence Gidney: "A Spectral Hue"
- Suyi Davies Okungabowa: "David Mogo: God Hunter"

== Octavia E. Butler Memorial Scholarship ==
The Octavia E. Butler Memorial Scholarship was established in Butler's memory in 2006 by the Society. Its goal is to provide an annual scholarship to enable writers of color to attend one of the Clarion writing workshops where Butler got her start. The first scholarship was awarded in 2007.
