= Farthing (magazine) =

Farthing is a defunct British science fiction magazine. The magazine was published between 2005 and 2007. It was based in London. Wendy Bradley was both the publisher and editor of the magazine.
