= Guardian Prime =

Fictional character

Publication information
- Publisher: Comic Republic
- First appearance: Might of Guardian Prime #1 (2013)
- Created by: Jide Martin; Wale Awelenje

In-story information
- Alter ego: Tunde Jaiye
- Species: Human
- Place of origin: Earth
- Abilities: Superhuman strength, speed and durability; Flight; Enhanced senses; Ability to intensify body heat and create fire; Shared Invulnerability

Guardian Prime (GP) is a comicbook character. The character was created by Comic Republic creators Jide Martin and Wale Awelenje as one of three proposed flagship characters for the venture.

== Publication history ==
Guardian Prime appeared for the first time in comic strips attached to movie flyers in Nigerian cinemas.

Subsequently, he appeared in Might Of Guardian Prime Issue 1, produced by Martin, Michael Balogun, and Ezeogu brothers Ozo and Tobe..

Martin described his motivation to create the character: "I saw that Nigeria was filled with so much negativity. This hero [was] designed to give us faith to see that our actions and words could indeed make a difference and throw a positive light on Nigeria to a global audience".

Jide described GP as a character designed as a moral role model.

== Abilities ==
GP is described as "Man, the way his creator intended him to be" and, "The fifth element, one of the five essential elements for life to exist on Earth (Earth, Water, Air, Fire and Man-to stand guard over the others)". NACSS commander, Jade Waziri's information classifies him as a "red class para human".

He has invulnerability, super strength, flight, speed, enhanced senses, ability to intensify his body heat, and the ability to temporarily pass his invulnerability to any object he touches. Guardian Prime has immense strength that enables him to carry a commercial jet and tear a helicopter in half.

He can fly at supersonic speeds, notably flying from the Sun to the Earth in fifteen minutes. He can survive in space without breathing equipment. He can intensify his body heat and create fire. Gaiya once said that he "can burn brighter than a blue star".

Guardian Prime fought Eevruwih, the spirit of aggression.

== Fictional biography ==
Born in Lagos, Nigeria, to Nigerian parents, Tunde Jaiye is the son of Danjuma Jaiye, a military general, and Evelyn Jaiye, a businesswoman. His baby sister is Chichi.

Tunde lived a sheltered life, believing in compassion and protecting the weak. When he becomes an adult, he learns that he is a Guardian. Guardians are tasked with protecting the human race, as ordained by Gaia, the Goddess of the Earth.

Every 2000 years, a new guardian is born. Depending on the state of the world, some guardians live out their entire lives without ever knowing who they really are. Their powers manifest only when they are needed most.
