= The Shadow Speaker =

2007 novel by Nnedi Okorafor

- Author: Nnedi Okorafor
- Genre: Fiction, Historical Fiction, Fantasy
- Publisher: Hyperion Book (Children's Books)
- Publication date: October 2, 2007
- Media type: Book
- Pages: 352
- ISBN: 1-4231-0033-6
- OCLC: 124156424
- LC Class: PZ7.O4157 Sh 2007

The Shadow Speaker is a young adult, first-person novel by Nigerian-American writer Nnedi Okorafor, which takes place in the year 2070. It was a Booksense Pick for Winter 2007/2008, a Tiptree Honor Book, a finalist for the Essence Magazine Literary Award, the Andre Norton Award and the Golden Duck Award and an NAACP Image Award nominee.

A deluxe revised edition of the novel, which was previously out of print, was published by DAW Books in 2023 under the title Shadow Speaker. It was followed by a sequel; Like Thunder.

== Plot ==
Ejimafor "Ejii" Ugabe is a fourteen-year-old Muslim half-Wodaabe, half-Igbo girl. She lives in the Nigerian village of Kwàmfa. Her father was once the hated dictator-like chief. She lives in the year 2070. The whole world is falling apart due to nuclear fallout in “the early twenty-first century”.

== Characters ==
- Ejimafor Ugabe - The 14-year-old daughter of the former Kwamfa Chief and one of the trusted advisers of the Sarauniya Jaa, the Red Queen.
- Sarauniya Jaa - The Red Queen. She is not an actual queen, but is treated like one. She witnessed the Great Change while a captive of a tribe who claimed her to be their queen. She was fourteen at the time. When she speaks a red flower always accompanies her words.
- Chief Ugabe - A hypocritical chief. He is said that he is of the fierce Woddabe tribe. When Jaa came to Kwamfa, the chief came along as an apprentice. He came back 1 month later. He seated himself chief in, quote, “...the name of our nurturing queen, Sarauniya Jaa!”. He apparently used that as an excuse to carry out his evil deeds. One day, Jaa came to Kwamfa and confronted the man and accused him of using her name in vain and doing things that she would never agree to do. Then she sliced his head off, and it rolled into a meat-eating plant which ate it. All in front of his oldest child, Ejii, and oldest son, Fadio (Ejii's half-brother). He was eventually buried without his head.
- Gambo - He is a co-husband of Jaa. He used to be an Aejej. He was turned into one when he was a child. Jaa was being attacked by him and she started talking to him. A Red flower fell as he calmed down and he turned back into a human. He would still be an Aejej in our time because according to the novel, he was an aejej a short while before the 21st century. That would mean that the Aejej is not a product of the Great Change.
- Buji - From the Northern portion of the Ooni Kingdom on Ginen. He is Jaa's first husband. They met while watching the "burning bushes" (Carnivorous bushes that feed on bugs that are a cross between wasps and fireflies which gives them a yellow, orange glow). Buji's Family expects to be a traditional wife. Showing respect to her husband, etc. But Jaa Marrying Buji, and Buji marrying Jaa are different. In this case, Jaa married Buji.
- Mrs. Ugabe - She is the chief's first wife and the divorced adviser to Jaa following the chief's execution.
- Dikeogu- A 14-year-old former slave who ran away from his camp. He is a Rain-maker, and because of the anti-powers mentality his parents forced him into slavery.

== Notable places ==
- Kwàmfa - The village which Ejii, the chief's family, and Mrs. Ugabe all live.
- Agadez - A real city, but notable events take place there.
- Ginen - Another world, not dominated by humans, but by plants. Religion seems to be of little interest. The majority of humans live in the Ooni Kingdom. Most human life outside the kingdom is in villages here and there.
- The Burning Bushes - One of the few odd things in the book that have a scientific reason. Every 25 years, luminescent wasps migrate to the fields and get eaten by Carnivorous plants who obtain their glow.

== Notable events ==
- The Great Change - A Eco terrorist extremist in Haiti creates a bomb with magic and nuclear power gathered from an African country. He calls it the Peace Bomb because the radioactivity will mutate everyone to look the same and have the same skin and therefore there would be no diversity and that also means no racism. He wants to use it, but it can easily be traced back to him through investigations. He uses trickery and makes the leaders of the world turn on each other, causing a total nuclear World War. He drops the Peace Bomb, but at the same time several other nuclear bombs have been dropped. The whole world starts to turn inside out. Forests pop out of nowhere, and then succeed. Children are born with magical powers, borders are blurred to the point that you walk out of your house in Texas and cross the street into Nigeria. Worlds are colliding.

== Religion ==
The author uses many references to religion. She uses the Many Minor Signs of the Apocalypse said in the Quran, such as guns not being available and a green haze that smells like flowers, among others.
