= The Book of Phoenix =

2015 science fantasy novel by Nnedi Okorafor

- UK edition cover
- Author: Nnedi Okorafor
- Audio read by: Robin Miles
- Illustrator: Eric Battle
- Language: English
- Genre: Science fantasy
- Publisher: DAW US, Hodder & Stoughton UK
- Publication date: 5 May 2015
- Publication place: Nigeria
- ISBN: 978-1-4447-6280-8
- OCLC: 920732085
- Followed by: Who Fears Death

The Book of Phoenix is a 2015 science fantasy novel by Nigerian American author Nnedi Okorafor. It is a stand alone prequel to Who Fears Death, it won the 2018 Kurd Laßwitz Preis for Best Foreign Fiction Book and was a finalist for the Arthur C. Clarke Award.

== Background ==
Nnedi Okorafor first started the novel as a short story titled "The Book of Phoenix" published in 2011 by Clarkesworld, then as a novella titled African Sunrise published in 2012 by Subterranean Press.

== Plot ==
The novel opens with an Okeke man, Sunuteel, who finds an ancient cave of computers. His portable finds an open file and he starts listening to an audio file called "The Book of Phoenix," which is called a "memory extract." He becomes immersed in the story.

Phoenix is an accelerated biological organism who was created by LifeGen Technologies and lives in Tower 7 in Manhattan with other SpeciMen. She is told that her lover, Saeed, has committed suicide. Phoenix and Mmuo, her friend and another SpeciMen who can walk through walls, attempted to escape and destroy the tower, after freeing Seven, a mysterious winged man who appears to be a powerful SpeciMen, locked in a dome, hanging like the Hanging Man in the Tarot. However, Phoenix is unable to escape and the Big Eyes catch her. She explodes into fire like a bomb, killing everyone near her and knocking Tower 7 down, freeing everyone inside who is still alive.

It seems she dies, but she regenerates a few days later and is given an alien seed by the Backbone to return to Ghana. Phoenix is being chased by the Big Eyes and while on the run she develops wings and with the aid of Seven, flies to Wulugu, Ghana where she secretly plants the seed. Seven flies with her and teaches her how to "slip," which is using time travel. She can use this ability to go back in time.

In Ghana, she is given the name Okore and she lives peacefully with the residents. A year later the Big Eye shows up in Wulugu under the disguise of investors and shoots Kofi, her lover. She then explodes into fire, putting Kofi out of his misery and killing all the Big Eyes nearby.

A reawakened Phoenix gives herself to the Big Eyes and is taken back to a tower in America. She escapes and reunites with Mmuo and Saeed. Saeed did not die of suicide, and instead awoke in a place where other dead SpeciMens were sent. But he was created to survive, and he did. Together the three of them destroy Tower 1, freeing all the inmates.

Phoenix is deemed a terrorist, but she still manages to get inside of the Library of Congress, to learn more about the corporation, herself, her history, her friends and her mother before she heads to Tower 4 along with Saeed and Mmuo.

They successfully free the inmates and find HeLa, who is a SpeciMen, has the DNA that will produce blood that will make the recipient of it immortal. That's what LifeGen Technologies is really doing: selling her blood to billionaires so they will live forever. There are 7 SpeciMen so far, who have the DNA. Phoenix is attacked by the Big Eye at Tower 4. HeLa asks Phoenix to kill her so that she can escape her fate, and not provide immortality to any others, denying them the power of immortality. Phoenix burns and kills her and several Big Eye members before she dies. Phoenix regenerates and "slips" to take a trip to visit her surrogate mother just before the woman dies of cancer. Returning from the trip, she finds out that Mmuo is dead and Saeed has been taken away by the Big Eyes.

In a might of anger and rage she over heats like the sun and explodes, causing an apocalypse to fall on Earth. Saeed survives, which is what he was engineered to do, and leaves the deadland of America and walks to the ruins of West Africa. Using Phoenix's feather and a machine, he extracts her memory which is sent to an unknown database center, before placing it on his skin to extract his memory. This is how The Book of Phoenix is preserved and told.

The novel ends with Sunuteel misinterpreting the Book of Phoenix on purpose and rewriting a wrong version of the story full of his own ideas which are used as the basis for the justification of the enslavement and oppression of the Okeke people by the Nuru people. Because this is what he was always taught and he could not believe otherwise. Another reason he changes the story was because the truth terrifies him after seeing Phoenix.

The epilogue is spoken by a mysterious white man. He says that the story will continue, which points to the next book in the series, Who Fears Death.

== Characters ==
- Phoenix Okore: An accelerated mutant with wings, intense heat and the ability to die and regenerate. She is a special SpeciMen created by Life Gen Technologies from samples collected from West Africans to be used as a biological weapon by the Big Eye. She fights to free all the SpeciMen and in the end she causes the Earth to fall an apocalypse.
- Saeed: Phoenix's lover, he was taken from Cairo, Egypt at a young age and was alter into a SpeciMen to be used as a weapon, he knows how to escape and survive any problem. He preserves Phoenix memory after surviving the apocalypse.
- Mmuo: A Nigerian man who is altered into a SpeciMen who possess the ability to walk through walls and is able to hack any computer. He barely wear cloths and is often naked because they alter his abilities.
- Seven: A legendary guardian from Senegal, who works as a saves people in New York from dangers, he is Phoenix mentor and was killed by a mob in New York. He states that he is a member of the leopard society and was killed in a wrestling match at the Zuma Rock Festival featured in Okorafor's Akata Witch.
- Bumi: A Nigerian Big Eye operative tasked with Taking care of Phoenix in Tower 7 and she seeks to capture her after Phoenix escape from the tower.
- Koffi Annan: Phoenix's lover in Ghana. He is a doctor and the only person to see her bury the alien seed and dies protecting her from the Big Eye after they arrive in Wulugu.
- HeLa: A SpeciMen whose blood grants immortality who lives in Tower 4. She is the last Jarawa person on the planet. Her blood is sold to wealthy billionaires and she longs for Death..
- Vera Takeisha Thomas: Phoenix's surrogate mother, she is an African American who is diagnosed with cancer due to her contact with phoenix and lives in a mental facility.
- Anansi Droids 419: Spider like robots which were initially created to protect the oil pipelines in Nigeria but however became violent towards humans.
- Sunuteel: A Nuru man who lived in the post apocalypse world. he finds phoenix extracted memory and used it to create the Great Book which is used to justify the oppression of the Okeke.

== Reception ==
The book received generally positive reactions from reviewers and readers.

A review from the Locus Magazine states that "The Book of Phoenix is actually a more playful and experimental novel than Who Fears Death, and in a weird and unsettling way, it's a lot of fun".

== Awards and Recognitions ==
- 2018 Kurd Laßwitz Preis, Won
- Arthur C. Clarke Award, Finalist
- Campbell Memorial Awards, Finalist
- 2015 Locus Recommending Reading List
- Book Riot Best Book of 2015
- Barnes and Noble Bookseller Pick 2015
