= Who Fears Death =

2010 science fantasy novel by Nnedi Okorafor

- Author: Nnedi Okorafor
- Cover artist: Greg Ruth
- Language: English
- Genre: Science fantasy, Africanfuturism
- Publisher: DAW/Penguin
- Publication date: 1 June 2010
- Publication place: Nigeria
- Media type: Print, e-book, audio book
- Pages: 304
- Awards: World Fantasy Award (2011)
- ISBN: 9780756406691
- OCLC: 1269240111
- Preceded by: The Book of Phoenix

Who Fears Death is a science fantasy novel by Nigerian-American writer Nnedi Okorafor, published in 2010 by DAW, then an imprint of Penguin Books. It was awarded the 2011 World Fantasy Award for Best Novel, as well as the 2010 Carl Brandon Kindred Award "for an outstanding work of speculative fiction dealing with race and ethnicity." Okorafor wrote a prequel, the novel The Book of Phoenix, published by DAW in 2015.

The novel takes place in a post-apocalyptic Africa, where the light-skinned Nuru oppress the dark-skinned Okeke.

In 2023, Okorafor announced an upcoming novella trilogy which would serve as a prequel and sequel to Who Fears Death and would focus on the life of Najeeba, Onyesonwu's mother. The first novella, She Who Knows, was published in 2024.

== Plot ==
The novel is set in a postapocalyptic Africa where the light-skinned Nuru oppress the darker-skinned Okeke people. Nuru men often rape Okeke women to create mixed-race Ewu children. Onyesonwu, whose name means "who fears death", is an Ewu sorceress. She narrates her tale to a Nuru journalist before her execution.

The novel opens with the death of Onyesonwu's stepfather, which occurred when Onyesonwu was sixteen. The plot shifts back to her childhood. Onyesonwu was conceived when her mother Najeeba was raped by a Nuru man. Najeeba and her daughter lived alone in the desert for several years before moving to the village of Jwahir.

The young Onyesonwu does not fit in with the townspeople and is often ostracized because she is an Ewu. Onye meets a blacksmith named Fadil Ogundimu who treats her well and eventually marries her mother. Against her parents' wishes, Onyesonwu undergoes female circumcision at age eleven in an attempt to be accepted by the community. This rite scars her both physically and magically; her biological father becomes aware of her existence and begins to hunt her through the spirit world. Onyesonwu bonds closely with the three other girls who undergo the rite: Binta, Diti, and Luyu. Soon after the rite, an Ewu boy named Mwita arrives at school. Mwita and Onyesonwu befriend each other. Mwita's master Aro, the local sorcerer, initially refuses to teach her because of her gender. Eventually, he relents and begins to teach her magic.

Onyesonwu goes through an initiation into sorcery, which reveals that her fate is to die by stoning at the hands of a Nuru crowd. She develops her powers, which include shape-shifting, resurrecting animals, and traveling to the "wilderness" (spirit world). She and Mwita become lovers.

When she is mocked by local villagers, Onyesonwu uses her abilities to make the townspeople relive her mother's rape. After this, she leaves Jwahir in order to help the Okeke experiencing genocide at the hands of the Nuru. Mwita, Binta, Diti, Luyu, and Diti's fiancé Fanasi travel with her. Onyesonwu discovers that she has been prophesied to rewrite the Great Book, a religious text which justifies the oppression of the Okeke people.

Onyesonwu uses her powers to regrow the clitoris of each girl who was circumcised during their adolescence. Tension grows among the group due to the harshness of the desert; Luyu and Fanasi begin an affair. They stop in a town for supplies. Onyesonwu and Mwita are attacked; Binta is killed. Onyesonwu blinds everyone in the town.

After Binta's death, the survivors encounter the Vah, a tribe who travels hidden by a magical sandstorm. Onyesonwu converses with the goddess Ani and encounters a dragon-like creature called a Kponyungo. This creature is later revealed to be Onyesonwu's mother Najeeba, who has also trained in sorcery. Onyesonwu's spirit is poisoned by her father, the sorcerer Daib, who is also revealed to be Mwita's former master. She is healed by a Vah sorceress.

Diti and Fanasi return to Jwahir. Onyesonwu, Luyu, and Mwita reach Durfa, a Nuru city where Daib resides. Onyesonwu attacks Daib, who kills Mwita but is gravely injured in turn. Luyu and Onyesonwu flee to an island where Onyesonwu finds the Great Book. She rewrites it with a magical script called Nsibidi. The remaining Nuru men reach the island, kill Luyu, and take Onyesonwu prisoner.

The epilogue, narrated by a Nuru who interviewed Onyesonwu, asserts that she was stoned to death and explains how he worked with his sister to dig her body. The final chapters describe an alternate ending in which Onyesonwu escapes execution by transforming into a Kponyungo and flying east to meet Mwita.

== Background and influences ==
Nnedi Okorafor started writing the novel after her father's death, the first scene of the novel was inspired by Okorafor's moments at her father's wake. The novel was also inspired in part by Emily Wax's 2004 Washington Post article "We Want to Make a Light Baby," which discussed the use of weaponized rape by Arab militiamen against Black African women in the Darfur conflict. According to Wax: "The victims and others said the rapes seemed to be a systematic campaign to humiliate the women, their husbands and fathers, and to weaken tribal ethnic lines." Okorafor wrote that this article "created the passageway through which Onyesonwu slipped through my world."

Okorafor based most of the traditional mysticism and beliefs on the traditional belief of the Igbo people, which she is a member of. The mythological Vah or "The Red People" was inspired by two red skinned Nigerian women Okorafor saw on two occasions during her visit to her home in Nigeria.

== Reception ==
The book received generally positive reception from reviewers and readers. A starred review from Publishers Weekly called the novel "A fantastical, magical blend of grand storytelling". A review from The Washington Post noted that the book was "both wondrously magical and terribly realistic". Zetta Brown of the New York Journal of Books states that, "To compare author Nnedi Okorafor to the late Octavia E. Butler would be easy to do, but this simple comparison should not detract from Okorafor's unique storytelling gift."

Besides winning the 2011 World Fantasy Award for Best Novel and the 2010 Carl Brandon Kindred Award, Who Fears Death was nominated for the 2011 Nebula Award for Best Novel and the 2011 Locus Award for Best Fantasy Novel. It also won the Best Foreign Novel award at the French Awards "Les Imaginales". Time ranked the novel as one of the 100 Best Fantasy Book of All Time.

The novel includes a graphic scene in which Onyesonwu is subjected to female genital mutilation (FGM), which she later learns may affect her magical powers. Steven Barnes of the American Book Review noted some had criticized the scene. In a blog post, Okorafor commented that she is proud of her Igbo identity, but that "culture is alive and it is fluid. It is not made of stone nor is it absolute. Some traditions/practices will be discarded and some will be added, but the culture still remains what it is. It is like a shape-shifting octopus that can lose a tentacle but still remain a shape-shifting octopus (yes, that image is meant to be complicated). Just because I believe that aspects of my culture are problematic does not mean I am "betraying" my people by pointing out those problems." She added: "What it [i.e., female genital cutting] all boils down to (and I believe the creators of this practice KNEW this even a thousand years ago) is the removal of a woman's ability to properly enjoy the act of sex. Again, this is about the control and suppression of women."

== TV adaptation ==
In July 2017, Okorafor announced the novel was the basis for an HBO television series in "early development", with George R. R. Martin serving as an executive producer; Selwyn Seyfu Hinds has been selected as scriptwriter. In January 2021 it was announced that Tessa Thompson's newly formed production company, Viva Maude, had joined the team and Aïda Mashaka Croal is serving as the new scriptwriter.

== See also ==
- Yeelen, a Malian film with similar subject matter.
