= Gary K. Wolfe =

American science fiction scholar, critic and editor

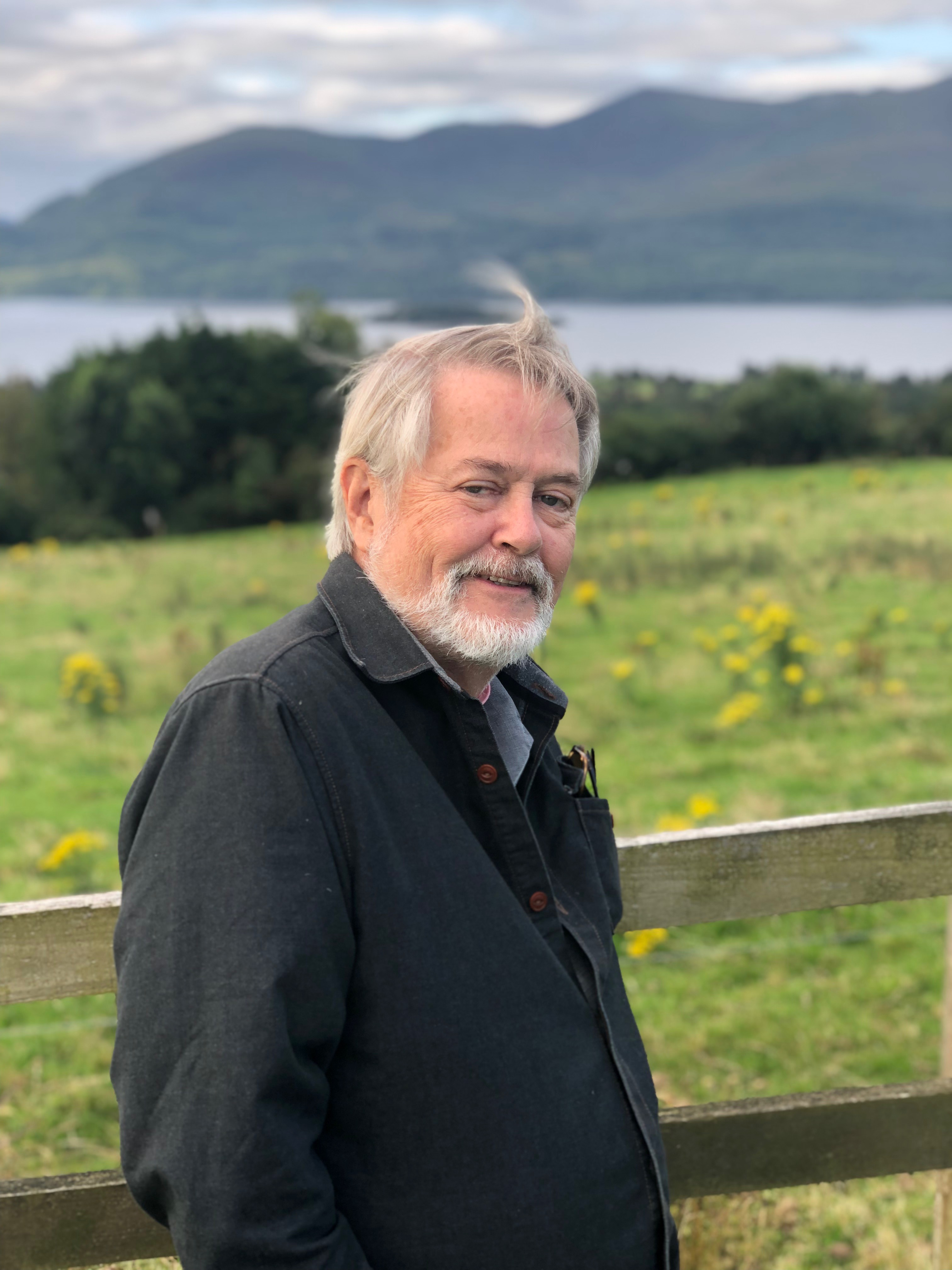
- Wolfe in Ireland, August 2019
- Born: Gary Kent Wolfe; March 24, 1946 (age 80); Sedalia, Missouri, United States
- Education: University of Kansas (BA); University of Chicago (MA, PhD)
- Occupations: Writer, professor, editor, critic
- Writing career
- Language: English
- Genres: Science fiction, biography

Gary K. Wolfe (born Gary Kent Wolfe in 1946) is an American science fiction editor, critic and biographer. He is an emeritus professor of humanities in Roosevelt University's Evelyn T. Stone College of Professional Studies.

== Biography ==
Wolfe was born on March 24, 1946, in Sedalia, Missouri. He moved to Carrollton, Missouri, at age 12, and to Springfield, Missouri, at 14, where he finished high school. He began attending Southwest Missouri State College, transferred to University of Kansas, where he earned a B.A. in English literature in 1968 and worked for his honors thesis under James E. Gunn.

Wolfe then earned both an M.A. and a Ph.D. in English literature at the University of Chicago, graduating in 1971.

He married Ellen "Dede" Weil, a teacher and community service activist, in 1996. They held another wedding celebration at the International Conference on the Fantastic in the Arts (ICFA) in March 1997. Wolfe and Weil were married until Weil's death in 2000. Before her death they collaborated on a book about Harlan Ellison, and often attended the International Conference on the Fantastic in the Arts in Florida.

== Writing career ==
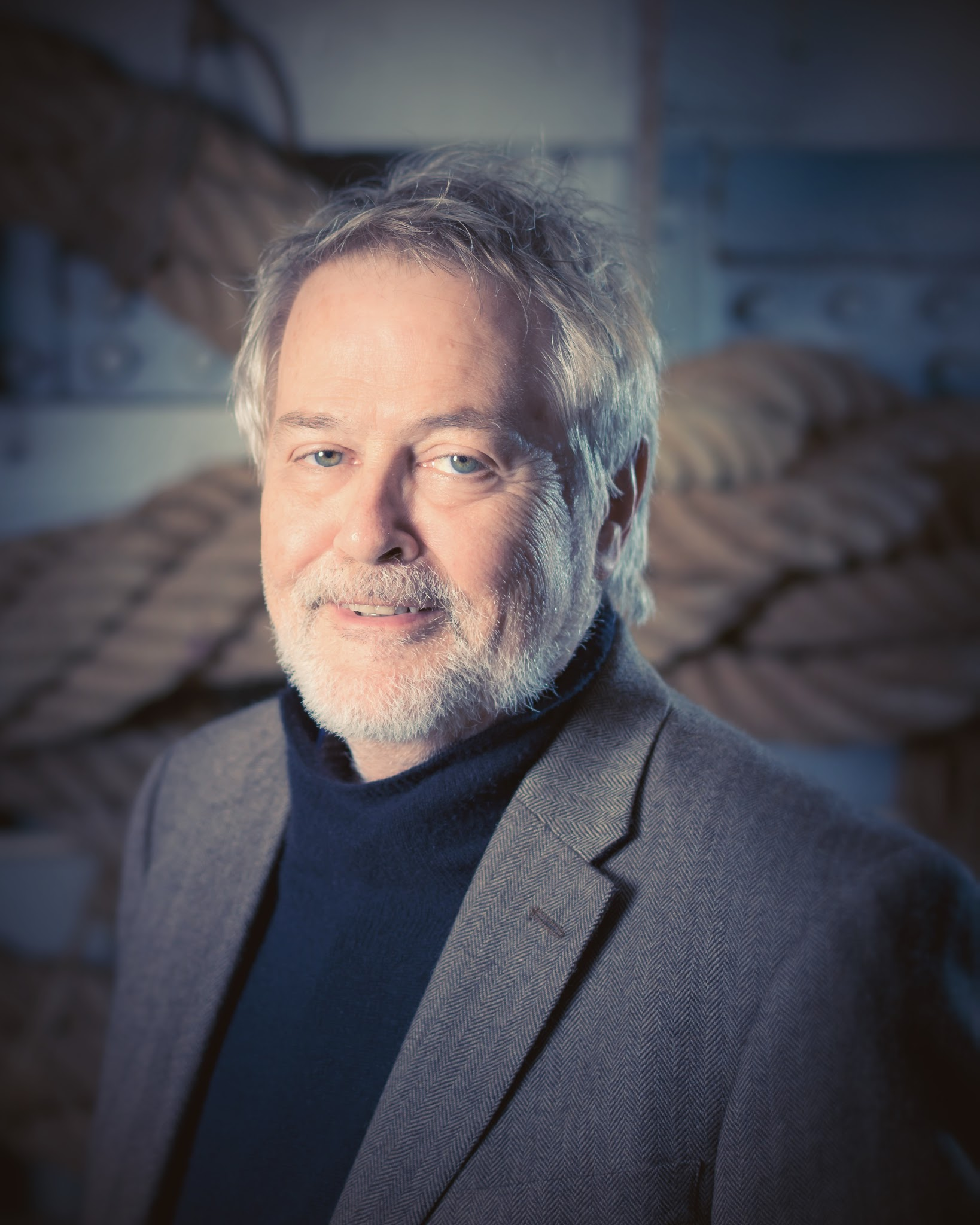
Gary K. Wolfe at Archipelacon 2015, where he was one of the Guests of Honor.

Wolfe has written extensively about science fiction and fantasy literature; he is recognized as one of the experts in the field.

His book Critical Terms for Science Fiction and Fantasy: A Glossary and Guide to Scholarship (1986) was described as a "landmark" work and "an indispensable guide" to "critical discourse and [...] popular discussions of fantasy and science fiction" by scholar David Sandner.

He has had a monthly review column in Locus since 1991 and has written for Salon and other sites. He collaborates with editor Jonathan Strahan on the Coode Street Podcast, a weekly discussion on science fiction and fantasy that was launched in May 2010, and is syndicated at Tor.com.

In 2016, he taught the course How Great Science Fiction Works for The Great Courses.

== Honors ==
- 1979 – Eaton Award from the Eaton Conference on Science Fiction for The Known and the Unknown: the Iconography of Science Fiction
- 1987 – Pilgrim Award for Lifetime Achievement from the Science Fiction Research Association
- 1998 – Distinguished Scholarship Award from the International Association for the Fantastic in the Arts
- 2005 – Award for Best Non-Fiction from the British Science Fiction Association for Soundings: Reviews 1992–1996

He was nominated for the Hugo Award for Best Related Work in 2006 for the book Soundings, Reviews 1992–1996, and again in 2011, for the book Bearings: Reviews 1997–2001. In addition, The Coode Street Podcast has been nominated for the Hugo Award for Best Fancast fifteen times and won once.

== Publications ==
=== Books ===
- The Known and the Unknown: the Iconography of Science Fiction (Kent State University Press, 1979)
- David Lindsay (Starmont House, 1979)
- Critical Terms for Science Fiction and Fantasy: A Glossary and Guide to Scholarship (Greenwood Press, 1986)
- Harlan Ellison: The Edge of Forever (with Ellen R. Weil, Ohio State University Press, 2002)
- Soundings: Reviews 1992–1996 (Beccon Publications, 2005)
- Bearings: Reviews 1997–2001 (Beccon Publications, 2010)
- Evaporating Genres: Essays on Fantastic Literature and Sightings (Wesleyan University Press, 2010)
- Sightings: Reviews 2002–2006 (Beccon Publications, 2011)
- American Science Fiction: Four Classic Novels 1953-1956 (Library of America, 2012)
- American Science Fiction: Five Classic Novels 1956-1958 (Library of America, 2012)

=== Book reviews ===
Date	Review article	Work(s) reviewed
2010	Wolfe, Gary K. (Jan 2010). "Locus Looks at Books". Locus (588): 15, 17, 45–46.	Bear, Greg (2009). Mariposa. Vanguard. ISBN 9781593154974.; Powers, Richard (2009). Generosity : an enhancement. Farrar, Straus and Giroux.; Nojiri, Housuke (2009). Usurper of the sun. Haikasoru. ISBN 9781421527710.; Jones, Gwyneth (2009). Imagination/space : essays and talks on fiction, feminism, technology, and politics. Aqueduct.; Andre-Driussi, Michael (2009). The Wizard Knight companion : a lexicon for Gene Wolfe's The Knight and The Wizard. Sirius Fiction.
2013	Wolfe, Gary K. (Dec 2013). "Locus Looks at Books". Locus (635): 16–17, 49–50.	Hartwell, David G., ed. (2013). Year's best SF 18. Tor.; Okorafor, Nnedi (2013). Kabu-Kabu: Stories. Prime.; Watts, Peter (2013). Beyond the Rift. Tachyon.; VanderMeer, Jeff (2013). Wonderbook : the illustrated guide to creating imaginative fiction. Abrams.
