= British Fantasy Award for Best Anthology =

Annual literary award for speculative fiction

- Awarded for: Collection of works by multiple authors
- Country: United Kingdom
- Presented by: British Fantasy Society
- First award: 1991; 35 years ago
- Most recent winner: Silk and Sinew: A Collection of Folk Horror from the Asian Diaspora ed. Kristy Park Kulski
- Website: britishfantasysociety.org
- Related: British Fantasy Award for Best Collection

The British Fantasy Award for Best Anthology is a literary award given annually as part of the British Fantasy Awards.

== History ==
The award for "Best Collection" was originally given to both anthologies and collections. After 1998, the award was divided into the British Fantasy Award for Best Collection and the award for Best Anthology.

== Winners and shortlists ==
* Winners

Year	Editor (Note: Editor, unless noted otherwise)	Work	Publisher	Ref.
1999	Stephen Jones*	Dark Terrors 4: the Gollancz Book of Horror	Gollancz	
1999	David Sutton*	Dark Terrors 4: the Gollancz Book of Horror	Gollancz	
1999	Avram Davidson (author)	The Avram Davidson Treasury	Tor Books	
1999	Robert Silverberg	The Avram Davidson Treasury	Tor Books	
1999	Grania Davis	The Avram Davidson Treasury	Tor Books	
1999	Gahan Wilson (author)	The Cleft and other Odd Tales	Tor Books	
1999	Richard Ford	The Granta Book of the American Long Story	Granta	
1999	Robert Silverberg	Legends	Tor Books / Harper Voyager	
1999	Jeff VanderMeer	Leviathan, Volume Two	The Ministry of Whimsy Press	
1999	Rose Secrest	Leviathan, Volume Two	The Ministry of Whimsy Press	
1999	Stephen Jones	The Mammoth Book of Best New Horror 9	Robinson	
1999	Steven Savile	Scaremongers 2: Redbrick Eden	Tanjen	
2000	Stephen Jones*	The Mammoth Book of Best New Horror 10	Robinson	
2000	Al Sarrantonio	999: New Stories of Horror and Suspense	Avon	
2000	John Pelan	The Last Continent: New Tales of Zothique	Shadowlands Press	
2000	Stephen Jones	White of the Moon: New Tales of Madness and Dread	Pumpkin Books	
2000	Ellen Datlow	The Year's Best Fantasy and Horror: Twelfth Annual Collection	St. Martin's Press	
2000	Terri Windling	The Year's Best Fantasy and Horror: Twelfth Annual Collection	St. Martin's Press	
2001	Brian Willis*	Hideous Progeny: a Frankenstein Anthology	Razorblade Press	
2001	Stephen Jones	Dark Terrors 5	Gollancz	
2001	David Sutton	Dark Terrors 5	Gollancz	
2001	M. P. N. Sims	F20: One	Enigmatic Press / British Fantasy Society	
2001	L. H. Maynard	F20: One	Enigmatic Press / British Fantasy Society	
2001	David J. Howe	F20: One	Enigmatic Press / British Fantasy Society	
2001	Stephen Jones	The Mammoth Book of Best New Horror 11	Robinson	
2001	Mike Chinn	Swords Against the Millennium	Alchemy Press	
2002	Stephen Jones*	The Mammoth Book of Best New Horror 12	Robinson	
2002	Peter Crowther	Futures	Gollancz	
2002	Stephen Jones	The Mammoth Book of Vampire Stories by Women	Robinson	
2002	David Sutton	Phantoms of Venice	Shadow Publishing	
2002	Ellen Datlow	The Year's Best Fantasy and Horror: Fourteenth Annual Collection	St. Martin's Press	
2002	Terri Windling	The Year's Best Fantasy and Horror: Fourteenth Annual Collection	St. Martin's Press	
2003	Stephen Jones*	Keep Out the Night	PS Publishing	
2003	Frank M. Robinson	Art of Imagination: 20th Century Visions of Science Fiction, Horror, and Fantasy	Collectors Press	
2003	Robert Weinberg	Art of Imagination: 20th Century Visions of Science Fiction, Horror, and Fantasy	Collectors Press	
2003	Randy Broecker	Art of Imagination: 20th Century Visions of Science Fiction, Horror, and Fantasy	Collectors Press	
2003	Stephen Jones	Dark Terrors 6	Gollancz	
2003	David Sutton	Dark Terrors 6	Gollancz	
2003	Robert Silverberg	Fantasy: The Best of 2001	ibooks	
2003	Karen Haber	Fantasy: The Best of 2001	ibooks	
2003	Stephen Jones	The Mammoth Book of Best New Horror 13	Robinson	
2003	Ellen Datlow	The Year's Best Fantasy and Horror: Fifteenth Annual Collection	St. Martin's Press	
2003	Terri Windling	The Year's Best Fantasy and Horror: Fifteenth Annual Collection	St. Martin's Press	
2004	Stephen Jones*	The Mammoth Book of Best New Horror 14	Robinson	
2004	Joel Lane	Beneath the Ground	Alchemy Press	
2004	Stephen Jones	By Moonlight Only	PS Publishing	
2004	Andy Cox	Crimewave 7: The Last Sunset	TTA Press	
2004	Jeff VanderMeer	The Thackery T. Lambshead Pocket Guide to Eccentric & Discredited Diseases	Night Shade Books	
2004	Mark Roberts	The Thackery T. Lambshead Pocket Guide to Eccentric & Discredited Diseases	Night Shade Books	
2004	Andy W. Robertson	William Hope Hodgson's Night Lands, Volume 1: Eternal Love	Wildside Press	
2005	Andrew Hook*	The Alsiso Project	Elastic Press	
2005	Barbara Roden	Acquainted with the Night	Ash-Tree Press	
2005	Christopher Roden	Acquainted with the Night	Ash-Tree Press	
2005	Stephen Jones	The Mammoth Book of Best New Horror 15	Robinson	
2005	Jeff VanderMeer	The Thackery T. Lambshead Pocket Guide to Eccentric & Discredited Diseases	Tor UK	
2005	Mark Roberts	The Thackery T. Lambshead Pocket Guide to Eccentric & Discredited Diseases	Tor UK	
2005	Ellen Datlow	The Year's Best Fantasy and Horror: Seventeenth Annual Collection	St. Martin's Press	
2005	Kelly Link	The Year's Best Fantasy and Horror: Seventeenth Annual Collection	St. Martin's Press	
2005	Gavin J. Grant	The Year's Best Fantasy and Horror: Seventeenth Annual Collection	St. Martin's Press	
2006	Allen Ashley*	The Elastic Book of Numbers	Elastic Press	
2006	Stephen Jones	Don't Turn Out the Light	PS Publishing	
2006	Peter Crowther	Fourbodings: A Quartet of Uneasy Tales from Four Members of the Macabre	Cemetery Dance Publications	
2006	Stephen Jones	The Mammoth Book of Best New Horror 16	Constable & Robinson	
2006	Gary Fry	Poe's Progeny	Gray Friar Press	
2007	Gary Couzens*	Extended Play: The Elastic Book of Music	Elastic Press	
2007	Stephen Jones	The Mammoth Book of Best New Horror 17	Robinson	
2007	Alison L. R. Davies	Shrouded by Darkness	Telos	
2007	Ellen Datlow	The Year's Best Fantasy and Horror: Nineteenth Annual Collection	St. Martin's Press	
2007	Gavin J. Grant	The Year's Best Fantasy and Horror: Nineteenth Annual Collection	St. Martin's Press	
2007	Kelly Link	The Year's Best Fantasy and Horror: Nineteenth Annual Collection	St. Martin's Press	
2008	Stephen Jones*	The Mammoth Book of Best New Horror 18	Robinson	
2008	Charles Black	The Black Book of Horror	Mortbury Press	
2008	Ian Alexander Martin	The First Humdrumming Book of Horror Stories	Humdrumming	
2008	John Grant	New Writings in the Fantastic	Pendragon	
2008	D. F. Lewis	Zencore!	Megazanthus	
2009	Stephen Jones*	The Mammoth Book of Best New Horror 19	Constable & Robinson	
2009	D. F. Lewis	Cone Zero	Megazanthus	
2009	Ian Whates	Myth-Understandings	NewCon	
2009	Allen Ashley	Subtle Edens	Elastic Press	
2009	Ian Alexander Martin	The Second Humdrumming Book of Horror	Humdrumming	
2009	Gary McMahon	We Fade to Grey	Pendragon	
2010	Stephen Jones*	The Mammoth Book of Best New Horror 20	Robinson	
2010	D. F. Lewis	Cern Zoo: Nemonymous 9	Megazanthus	
2010	George R. R. Martin	Songs of the Dying Earth: Stories in Honour of Jack Vance	Harper Voyager	
2010	Gardner Dozois	Songs of the Dying Earth: Stories in Honour of Jack Vance	Harper Voyager	
2010	Marie O'Regan	Hellbound Hearts	Pocket Books	
2010	Paul Kane	Hellbound Hearts	Pocket Books	
2010	Holly Stacey	Dragontales: Short Stories of Flame, Tooth and Scale	Wyvern	
2011	Johnny Mains*	Back from the Dead: The Legacy of the Pan Book of Horror Stories	Noose & Gibbet	
2011	Jonathan Oliver	The End of the Line	Solaris Books	
2011	Stephen Jones	The Mammoth Book of Best New Horror 21	Robinson	
2011	Allyson Bird	Never Again	Gray Friar Press	
2011	Joel Lane	Never Again	Gray Friar Press	
2011	Stephen Jones	Zombie Apocalypse!	Robinson	
2012	Jeff VanderMeer*	The Weird	Corvus	
2012	Ann VanderMeer*	The Weird	Corvus	
2012	Stephen Jones	A Book of Horrors	Jo Fletcher	
2012	Jonathan Oliver	House of Fear	Solaris Books	
2012	Conrad Williams	Gutshot	PS Publishing	
2013	Jonathan Oliver*	Magic: an Anthology of the Esoteric and Arcane	Solaris Books	
2013	Paul Finch	Terror Tales of the Cotswolds	Gray Friar Press	
2013	Marie O'Regan	The Mammoth Book of Ghost Stories by Women	Robinson	
2013	Anne C. Perry	A Town Called Pandemonium	Jurassic London	
2013	Jared Shurin	A Town Called Pandemonium	Jurassic London	
2014	Jonathan Oliver*	End of the Road	Solaris Books	
2014	Charles Black	The Tenth Black Book of Horror	Mortbury Press	
2014	Stephen Jones	Fearie Tales	Jo Fletcher	
2014	David Rix	Rustblind and Silverbright	Eibonvale	
2014	Mhairi Simpson	Tales of Eve	Fox Spirit	
2015	Christie Yant*	Lightspeed: Women Destroy Science Fiction Special Issue	Lightspeed	
2015	Jan Edwards	The Alchemy Press Book of Urban Mythic 2	Alchemy Press	
2015	Jenny Barber	The Alchemy Press Book of Urban Mythic 2	Alchemy Press	
2015	Paul Finch	Terror Tales of Wales	Gray Friar Press	
2015	Joel Lane	Horror Uncut: Tales of Social Insecurity and Economic Unease	Gray Friar Press	
2015	Tom Johnstone	Horror Uncut: Tales of Social Insecurity and Economic Unease	Gray Friar Press	
2015	Mark Morris	The Spectral Book of Horror Stories	Spectral	
2016	Ellen Datlow*	The Doll Collection	Tor Books	
2016	Margrét Helgadóttir	African Monsters	Fox Spirit	
2016	Jo Thomas	African Monsters	Fox Spirit	
2016	Johnny Mains	Best British Horror 2015	Salt Publishing	
2016	Mark Morris	The Second Spectral Book of Horror Stories	Spectral	
2016	Simon Strantzas	Aickman's Heirs	Undertow	
2017	Nalo Hopkinson*	People of Colo(u)r Destroy Science Fiction	Lightspeed	
2017	Kristine Ong*	People of Colo(u)r Destroy Science Fiction	Lightspeed	
2017	Roz Clarke	Fight Like a Girl	Kristell Ink	
2017	Joanne Hall	Fight Like a Girl	Kristell Ink	
2017	Peter Coleborn	Something Remains	Alchemy Press	
2017	Pauline E. Dungate	Something Remains	Alchemy Press	
2017	Margrét Helgadóttir	Asian Monsters	Fox Spirit	
2017	Dominik Parisien	The Starlit Wood	Saga Press	
2017	Navah Wolfe	The Starlit Wood	Saga Press	
2017	Conrad Williams	Dead Letters	Titan Books	
2018	Mark Morris*	New Fears	Titan Books	
2018	George Sandison	2084	Unsung Stories	
2018	Steve Shaw	Dark Satanic Mills: Great British Horror Book 2	Black Shuck Books	
2018	James Everington	Imposter Syndrome	Dark Minds Press	
2018	Dan Howarth	Imposter Syndrome	Dark Minds Press	
2018	Margrét Helgadóttir	Pacific Monsters	Fox Spirit	
2019	Robert Shearman*	Year's Best Weird Fiction, Vol. 5	Undertow	
2019	Michael Kelly*	Year's Best Weird Fiction, Vol. 5	Undertow	
2019	Ellen Datlow	The Devil and the Deep: Horror Stories of the Sea	Night Shade Books	
2019	Sarah Doyle	Humanagerie	Eibonvale	
2019	Allen Ashley	Humanagerie	Eibonvale	
2019	Mark Morris	New Fears 2	Titan Books	
2019	Dan Coxon	This Dreaming Isle	Unsung Stories	
2020	Nisi Shawl*	New Suns: Original Speculative Fiction by People of Color	Solaris Books	
2020	Jennifer Brozek	A Secret Guide to Fighting Elder Gods	Pulse Publishing	
2020	Ann VanderMeer	The Big Book of Classic Fantasy	Vintage Books	
2020	Jeff VanderMeer	The Big Book of Classic Fantasy	Vintage Books	
2020	David Gullen	Once Upon a Parsec: The Book of Alien Fairy Tales	NewCon	
2020	Marie O'Regan	Wonderland	Titan Books	
2020	Paul Kane	Wonderland	Titan Books	
2020	Phil Sloman	The Woods	Hersham Horror	
2021	Zelda Knight*	Dominion: An Anthology of Speculative Fiction from Africa and the African Diaspora	Aurelia Leo	
2021	Oghenechovwe Donald Ekpeki*	Dominion: An Anthology of Speculative Fiction from Africa and the African Diaspora	Aurelia Leo	
2021	Mark Morris	After Sundown	Flame Tree Publishing	
2021	Lee Murray	Black Cranes: Tales of Unquiet Women	Omnium Gatherum	
2021	Geneve Flynn	Black Cranes: Tales of Unquiet Women	Omnium Gatherum	
2021	Michael Kelly	Shadows & Tall Trees, Vol. 8	Undertow	
2022	Xueting Christine Ni*	Sinopticon: A Celebration of Chinese Science Fiction	Solaris Books	
2022	Sophie Essex	Dreamland: Other Stories	Black Shuck Books	
2022	Dan Coxon	Out of the Darkness	Unsung Stories	
2022	Aaron J. French	There Is No Death, There Are No Dead	Crystal Lake	
2022	Jess Landry	There Is No Death, There Are No Dead	Crystal Lake	
2022	Ellen Datlow	When Things Get Dark	Titan Books	
2022	Oghenechovwe Donald Ekpeki	The Year's Best African Speculative Fiction	Jembefola	
2023	Jonathan Strahan*	Someone in Time	Solaris Books	
2023	Sheree Renée Thomas	Africa Risen: A New Era of Speculative Fiction	Tordotcom	
2023	Oghenechovwe Donald Ekpeki	Africa Risen: A New Era of Speculative Fiction	Tordotcom	
2023	Zelda Knight	Africa Risen: A New Era of Speculative Fiction	Tordotcom	
2023	Mae Murray	The Book of Queer Saints	Medusa	
2023	Steve J. Shaw	Great British Horror 7: Major Arcana	Black Shuck Books	
2023	Dan Coxon	Isolation: The Horror Anthology	Titan Books	
2023	Lee C. Conley et al.	Sky Breaker: Tales of the Wanderer	Nordic	
2024	Jordan Peele*	Out There Screaming: An Anthology of New Black Horror	Random House	
2024	John Joseph Adams*	Out There Screaming: An Anthology of New Black Horror	Random House	
2024	Sophie Essex	At the Lighthouse	Eibonvale	
2024	Wole Talabi	Mothersound: The Sauútiverse Anthology	Android Press	
2024	Shane Hawk	Never Whistle at Night	Vintage Books	
2024	Theodore C. Van Alst Jr.	Never Whistle at Night	Vintage Books	
2024	Steve J. Shaw	Great British Horror 8	Black Shuck Books	
2024	Marie O'Regan	The Other Side of Never: Dark Tales from the World of Peter & Wendy	Titan Books	
2024	Paul Kane	The Other Side of Never: Dark Tales from the World of Peter & Wendy	Titan Books	
2025	Sofia Ajram*	Bury Your Gays – An Anthology of Tragic Queer Horror	Ghoulish	
2025	Neil Williamson	Nova Scotia 2	Luna Press Publishing	
2025	Andrew J. Wilson	Nova Scotia 2	Luna Press Publishing	
2025	Trip Galey	I Want That Twink Obliterated!	Bona Books	
2025	C. L. McCartney	I Want That Twink Obliterated!	Bona Books	
2025	Robert Berg	I Want That Twink Obliterated!	Bona Books	
2025	Roz Clarke	Fight Like A Girl 2	Wizard's Tower Press	
2025	Joanne Hall	Fight Like A Girl 2	Wizard's Tower Press	
2025	Dan Coxon	Heartwood: A Mythago Wood Anthology	PS Publishing	
2025	Oghenechovwe Donald Ekpeki	The Year's Best African Speculative Fiction 2023	Caezik SF & Fantasy	
2025	Chinaza Eziaghighala	The Year's Best African Speculative Fiction 2023	Caezik SF & Fantasy	
2026	Kristy Park Kulski*	Silk and Sinew: A Collection of Folk Horror from the Asian Diaspora	Bad Hand Books	
2026	J S Fields	Lesbians In Space: Where No Man Has Gone Before	Space Wizard Press	
2026	William C Tracey	Lesbians In Space: Where No Man Has Gone Before	Space Wizard Press	
2026	Heather Tracey	Lesbians In Space: Where No Man Has Gone Before	Space Wizard Press	
2026	Neil Williamson	Blood in the Bricks	NewCon Press	
2026	Dave Jeffery	This Way Lies Madness	Flame Tree Publishing	
2026	Lee Murray	This Way Lies Madness	Flame Tree Publishing	
