= The Year's Best African Speculative Fiction =

Collection of short stories by Oghenechovwe Donald Ekpeki

- Volume I
- Edited by: Oghenechovwe Donald Ekpeki
- Cover artist: Maria Spada
- Country: Nigeria
- Language: English
- Genre: Speculative fiction
- Publisher: Jembefola Press
- Published: September 21, 2021
- Media type: e-Book
- Website: Anthology page on Jembefola Press site

The Year's Best African Speculative Fiction is an anthology of African speculative fiction edited by Oghenechovwe Donald Ekpeki.

== Background ==
Ekpeki was inspired to publish the book after the positive reception of his earlier African speculative fiction anthology, Dominion, to "create more spaces for the works of speculative fiction writers of African descent to be appreciated".

All the stories in the anthology are reprints of stories first published elsewhere.

== Contents ==
Title	Author	Notes
"Where You Go"	Somto O. Ihezue	
"Things Boys Do"	Pemi Aguda	
"Giant Steps"	Russell Nichols	
"The Future in Saltwater"	Tamara Jerée	
"The ThoughtBox"	Tlotlo Tsamaase	
"The Parts That Make Us Monsters"	Sheree Renée Thomas	
"Scar Tissue"	Tobias S. Buckell	
"Ancestries"	Sheree Renée Thomas	
"Breath of the Sahara"	Inegbenoise O. Osagie	
The Many Lives of an Abiku"	Tobi Ogundiran	
"A Love Song for Herkinal as Composed by Ashkernas Amid the Ruins of New Haven”	Chinelo Onwualu	
"A Curse at Midnight"	Moustapha Mbacké Diop	
"A Mastery of German"	Marian Denise Moore	
"Are We Ourselves?"	Michelle Mellon	
"When the Last of the Birds and the Bees Have Gone On”	C. L. Clark	
"The Goatkeeper's Harvest"	Tobi Ogundiran	
"Baba Klep"	Eugen Bacon	
"Desiccant"	Craig Laurance Gidney	
"Disassembly"	Makena Onjerika	
"The River of Night"	Tlotlo Tsamaase	
Egoli"	T. L. Huchu	
"The Friendship Bench"	Yvette Lisa Ndlovu	
"Fort Kwame"	Derek Lubangakene	
"We Come as Gods"	Suyi Davies Okungbowa	
"And This is How to Stay Alive"	Shingai Njeri Kagunda	
"The Front Line"	WC Dunlap	
"Penultimate"	Z. Z. Claybourne	
"Love Hangover"	Sheree Renée Thomas	
"Red_Bati"	Dilman Dila	

== Themes ==
Parenthood, family, and relationships to the past are themes across many stories in the anthology. Both straight and queer points of view are explored.

Stories in the anthology include the genres of Afrofuturism, Africanfuturism, high fantasy, hard science fiction, horror, slipstream, climate fiction, cyberpunk, and weird fiction.

== Reception ==
Fiona Moore in a British Science Fiction Association review describes the anthology as "a good general representation of the state of SFF in Africa and the diaspora". Moore is somewhat critical of the large number of American contributors compared to those of other nationalities, although admitting that such a distribution is understandable given the nature of the publishing industry, and that African American writers are still underrepresented overall in literature.

Writing for the British Fantasy Society, Sarah Deeming highly recommends the anthology. Deeming praises the high quality of the stories, noting that many "had a musical quality, almost like poetry rather than prose, and each one deserved reprinting". She particularly highlights three stories: "Things Boys Do" by Pemi Aguda; "Scar Tissue" by Tobias S. Buckell, which Deeming describes as "beautifully written and well-thought-out"; and the "fresh and seductive" story "Love Hangover" by Sheree Renée Thomas.

T.G. Shenoy also highlights "Things Boys Do" and "Scar Tissue", as well as praising stories by WC Dunlap, Russell Nichols, Chinelo Onwualu, and Marian Denise Moore in a review for Locus. Shenoy labels the anthology as a whole a "must-read". He suggests that the anthology may have been improved by including a discussion of African speculative fiction and the creative choices that went into putting together the book, or including Ekpeki's novella Ife-Iyoku, The Tale of Imadeyunuagbon. However, Shenoy notes that their lack of inclusion does not in itself diminish the anthology.

== Awards and nominations ==
The anthology was nominated for the 2022 Locus Award for Best Anthology. It won the 2022 World Fantasy Award—Anthology. Maria Spada's cover art for the book was longlisted for the 2022 BSFA Award for Best Artwork.
