= World Fantasy Award—Anthology =

Literary award for science fiction or fantasy anthologies in English

- Awarded for: The best anthology of fantasy stories by multiple authors published in English in the prior calendar year
- Presented by: World Fantasy Convention
- First award: 1988
- Most recent winner: Julie C. Day, Carina Bissett, & Craig Laurance Gidney (Storyteller: A Tanith Lee Tribute Anthology)
- Website: worldfantasy.org/awards/

The World Fantasy Awards are given each year by the World Fantasy Convention for the best fantasy fiction published in English during the previous calendar year. The awards have been described by book critics such as The Guardian as a "prestigious fantasy prize", and one of the three most prestigious speculative fiction awards, along with the Hugo and Nebula Awards (which cover both fantasy and science fiction). The World Fantasy Award—Anthology is given each year for anthologies of fantasy stories by multiple authors published in English. An anthology can have any number of editors, and works in the anthology may have been previously published; awards are also given out for collections of works by a single author in the Collection category. The Anthology category has been awarded annually since 1988, though from 1977 through 1987 anthologies were admissible as nominees in the Collection category. During the ten years they were admissible for that category they won the award seven times and represented 38 of the 56 nominations.

World Fantasy Award nominees and winners are decided by attendees and judges at the annual World Fantasy Convention. A ballot is posted in June for attendees of the current and previous two conferences to determine two of the finalists, and a panel of five judges adds three or more nominees before voting on the overall winner. The panel of judges is typically made up of fantasy authors and is chosen each year by the World Fantasy Awards Administration, which has the power to break ties. The final results are presented at the World Fantasy Convention at the end of October. Winners were presented with a statue in the form of a bust of H. P. Lovecraft through the 2015 awards; more recent winners receive a statuette of a tree.

During the 39 nomination years, 145 editors have had works nominated; 45 of them have won, including co-editors. Only six editors have won more than once. Ellen Datlow has won 8 times out of 40 nominations, the most of any editor; Terri Windling has won 6 times out of 18 nominations, all of the nominations as a co-editor with Datlow; Jeff VanderMeer has two wins each out of seven nominations, with both wins and five nominations shared with Ann VanderMeer; Jack Dann has won twice out of five nominations; Sheree Thomas and Dennis Etchison have won twice out of three nominations, and Oghenechovwe Donald Ekpeki was won both of his nominations. After Datlow and Windling, the editors with the most nominations are Stephen Jones, who has won once out of fifteen nominations, Gardner Dozois, who has won once out of seven nominations, Jonathan Strahan, who has won once out of six nominations, and John Joseph Adams, David Sutton, and Martin H. Greenberg, who each have been nominated six times without winning.

== Winners and nominees ==
In the following table, the years correspond to the date of the ceremony, rather than when the anthology was first published. Each year links to the corresponding "year in literature". Entries with a yellow background and an asterisk (*) next to the editor's name have won the award; the other entries are the other nominees on the shortlist.

* Winners

Winners and nominees
Year	Editor	Anthology	Publisher	Ref.
1988	Kathryn Cramer*	The Architecture of Fear	Arbor House	
1988	Peter D. Pautz*	The Architecture of Fear	Arbor House	
1988	David G. Hartwell	The Dark Descent	Tor Books	
1988	Jeanne Van Buren Dann	In the Field of Fire	Tor Books	
1988	Jack Dann	In the Field of Fire	Tor Books	
1988	J. N. Williamson	Masques II	Maclay & Associates	
1988	Anonymous	Night Visions 4	Dark Harvest	
1988	Christopher Evans	Other Edens	Allen & Unwin	
1988	Robert Holdstock	Other Edens	Allen & Unwin	
1988	Karl Edward Wagner	The Year's Best Horror Stories: XV	DAW Books	
1989	Ellen Datlow*	The Year's Best Fantasy: First Annual Collection	St. Martin's Press	
1989	Terri Windling*	The Year's Best Fantasy: First Annual Collection	St. Martin's Press	
1989	Anonymous	Night Visions 6	Dark Harvest	
1989	Douglas E. Winter	Prime Evil	New American Library	
1989	David Schow	Silver Scream	Dark Harvest	
1990	Ellen Datlow*	The Year's Best Fantasy: Second Annual Collection	St. Martin's Press	
1990	Terri Windling*	The Year's Best Fantasy: Second Annual Collection	St. Martin's Press	
1990	Ellen Datlow	Blood Is Not Enough	William Morrow and Company	
1990	John Skipp	Book of the Dead	Bantam Books	
1990	Craig Spector	Book of the Dead	Bantam Books	
1990	Joe R. Lansdale	Razored Saddles	Dark Harvest	
1990	Pat LoBrutto	Razored Saddles	Dark Harvest	
1991	Stephen Jones*	Best New Horror	Constable & Robinson, Carroll & Graf Publishers	
1991	Ramsey Campbell*	Best New Horror	Constable & Robinson, Carroll & Graf Publishers	
1991	Ellen Datlow	Alien Sex	Dutton Penguin	
1991	Thomas F. Monteleone	Borderlands	Maclay & Associates, Avon Publications	
1991	David Sutton	Dark Voices 2: The Pan Book of Horror	Pan Books	
1991	Stephen Jones	Dark Voices 2: The Pan Book of Horror	Pan Books	
1991	Kathryn Cramer	Walls of Fear	William Morrow and Company	
1991	Ellen Datlow	The Year's Best Fantasy and Horror: Third Annual Collection	St. Martin's Press	
1991	Terri Windling	The Year's Best Fantasy and Horror: Third Annual Collection	St. Martin's Press	
1992	Ellen Datlow*	The Year's Best Fantasy and Horror: Fourth Annual Collection	St. Martin's Press	
1992	Terri Windling*	The Year's Best Fantasy and Horror: Fourth Annual Collection	St. Martin's Press	
1992	Martin H. Greenberg	After the King: Stories in Honor of J.R.R. Tolkien	Tor Books	
1992	Stefan R. Dziemianowicz	Famous Fantastic Mysteries	Gramercy Books	
1992	Robert Weinberg	Famous Fantastic Mysteries	Gramercy Books	
1992	Martin H. Greenberg	Famous Fantastic Mysteries	Gramercy Books	
1992	Charles L. Grant	Final Shadows	Doubleday Foundation	
1992	Lewis Shiner	When the Music's Over	Bantam Spectra	
1992	Ellen Datlow	A Whisper of Blood	William Morrow and Company	
1993	Dennis Etchison*	MetaHorror	Dell Abyss	
1993	F. Paul Wilson	Freak Show	Pocket Books	
1993	Richard Gilliam	Grails: Quests, Visitations and Other Occurrences	Unnameable Press	
1993	Martin H. Greenberg	Grails: Quests, Visitations and Other Occurrences	Unnameable Press	
1993	Edward E. Kramer	Grails: Quests, Visitations and Other Occurrences	Unnameable Press	
1993	Peter Crowther	Narrow Houses	Little, Brown and Company	
1993	Don Hutchison	Northern Frights	Mosaic Press	
1994	Lou Aronica*	Full Spectrum 4	Bantam Spectra	
1994	Amy Stout*	Full Spectrum 4	Bantam Spectra	
1994	Betsy Mitchell*	Full Spectrum 4	Bantam Spectra	
1994	David G. Hartwell	Christmas Forever	Tor Books	
1994	Alison Lurie	The Oxford Book of Modern Fairy Tales	Oxford University Press	
1994	George Hatch	Sinistre	Horror's Head Press	
1994	Ellen Datlow	Snow White, Blood Red	Morrow AvoNova	
1994	Terri Windling	Snow White, Blood Red	Morrow AvoNova	
1994	Ellen Datlow	The Year's Best Fantasy and Horror: Sixth Annual Collection	St. Martin's Press	
1994	Terri Windling	The Year's Best Fantasy and Horror: Sixth Annual Collection	St. Martin's Press	
1995	Ellen Datlow*	Little Deaths	Millennium	
1995	Ellen Datlow	Black Thorn, White Rose	Morrow AvoNova	
1995	Terri Windling	Black Thorn, White Rose	Morrow AvoNova	
1995	Poppy Z. Brite	Love in Vein	HarperPrism	
1995	Martin H. Greenberg	Love in Vein	HarperPrism	
1995	Stephen Jones	Shadows Over Innsmouth	Fedogan & Bremer	
1996	A. Susan Williams*	The Penguin Book of Modern Fantasy by Women	Viking Press	
1996	Richard Glyn Jones*	The Penguin Book of Modern Fantasy by Women	Viking Press	
1996	Nancy A. Collins	Dark Love	Roc Books	
1996	Edward E. Kramer	Dark Love	Roc Books	
1996	Martin H. Greenberg	Dark Love	Roc Books	
1996	Stephen Jones	Dark Terrors	Victor Gollancz	
1996	David Sutton	Dark Terrors	Victor Gollancz	
1996	Steve Rasnic Tem	High Fantastic	Ocean View Books	
1996	Lucy Sussex	She's Fantastical	Sybylla Feminist Press	
1996	Judith Raphael Buckrich	She's Fantastical	Sybylla Feminist Press	
1997	Patrick Nielsen Hayden*	Starlight 1	Tor Books	
1997	Stephen Jones	Dark Terrors 2	Victor Gollancz	
1997	David Sutton	Dark Terrors 2	Victor Gollancz	
1997	Katharine Kerr	The Shimmering Door	HarperPrism	
1997	Martin H. Greenberg	The Shimmering Door	HarperPrism	
1997	Ellen Datlow	The Year's Best Fantasy and Horror: Ninth Annual Collection	St. Martin's Press	
1997	Terri Windling	The Year's Best Fantasy and Horror: Ninth Annual Collection	St. Martin's Press	
1998	Nicola Griffith*	Bending the Landscape: Fantasy	White Wolf Publishing	
1998	Stephen Pagel*	Bending the Landscape: Fantasy	White Wolf Publishing	
1998	Stephen Jones	Dark Terrors 3	Victor Gollancz	
1998	David Sutton	Dark Terrors 3	Victor Gollancz	
1998	Gardner Dozois	Modern Classics of Fantasy	St. Martin's Press	
1998	Don Hutchison	Northern Frights 4	Mosaic Press	
1998	Douglas E. Winter	Revelations	HarperPrism	
1999	Jack Dann*	Dreaming Down-Under	HarperCollins Voyager	
1999	Janeen Webb*	Dreaming Down-Under	HarperCollins Voyager	
1999	Bryan Cholfin	The Best of Crank!	Tor Books	
1999	Stephen Jones	Dark Terrors 4	Victor Gollancz	
1999	David Sutton	Dark Terrors 4	Victor Gollancz	
1999	Robert Silverberg	Legends	Tor Books	
1999	Patrick Nielsen Hayden	Starlight 2	Tor Books	
2000	Ellen Datlow*	Silver Birch, Blood Moon	Avon Publications	
2000	Terri Windling*	Silver Birch, Blood Moon	Avon Publications	
2000	Al Sarrantonio	999: New Stories of Horror and Suspense	Avon Publications	
2000	Stephen Jones	Dark Detectives: Adventures of the Supernatural Sleuths	Fedogan & Bremer	
2000	Don Hutchison	Northern Frights 5	Mosaic Press	
2000	Ellen Datlow	The Year's Best Fantasy and Horror: Twelfth Annual Collection	St. Martin's Press	
2000	Terri Windling	The Year's Best Fantasy and Horror: Twelfth Annual Collection	St. Martin's Press	
2001	Sheree Thomas*	Dark Matter: A Century of Speculative Fiction from the African Diaspora	Warner Aspect	
2001	Stephen Jones	Dark Terrors 5	Victor Gollancz	
2001	David Sutton	Dark Terrors 5	Victor Gollancz	
2001	Barbara Roden	Shadows and Silence	Ash-Tree Press	
2001	Christopher Roden	Shadows and Silence	Ash-Tree Press	
2001	Ellen Datlow	Vanishing Acts	Tor Books	
2001	Nalo Hopkinson	Whispers from the Cotton Tree Root: Caribbean Fabulist Fiction	Invisible Cities Press	
2001	Ellen Datlow	The Year's Best Fantasy and Horror: Thirteenth Annual Collection	St. Martin's Press	
2001	Terri Windling	The Year's Best Fantasy and Horror: Thirteenth Annual Collection	St. Martin's Press	
2002	Dennis Etchison*	The Museum of Horrors	Leisure Books	
2002	Stephen Jones	The Mammoth Book of Best New Horror: Volume Twelve	Constable & Robinson, Carroll & Graf Publishers	
2002	Stephen Jones	The Mammoth Book of Vampire Stories by Women	Constable & Robinson, Carroll & Graf Publishers	
2002	Jerad Walters	Stigmata	Cocytus Press	
2002	Ellen Datlow	The Year's Best Fantasy and Horror: Fourteenth Annual Collection	St. Martin's Press	
2002	Terri Windling	The Year's Best Fantasy and Horror: Fourteenth Annual Collection	St. Martin's Press	
2003	Ellen Datlow*	The Green Man: Tales from the Mythic Forest	Viking Press	
2003	Terri Windling*	The Green Man: Tales from the Mythic Forest	Viking Press	
2003	Jeff VanderMeer	Leviathan, Volume Three	The Ministry of Whimsy Press	
2003	Forrest Aguirre	Leviathan, Volume Three	The Ministry of Whimsy Press	
2003	Brian Thomsen	The American Fantasy Tradition	Tor Books	
2003	Peter Straub	Conjunctions 39: The New Wave Fabulists	Bard College	
2003	Ellen Datlow	The Year's Best Fantasy and Horror: Fifteenth Annual Collection	St. Martin's Press	
2003	Terri Windling	The Year's Best Fantasy and Horror: Fifteenth Annual Collection	St. Martin's Press	
2004	Rosalie Parker*	Strange Tales	Tartarus Press	
2004	Ellen Datlow	The Dark: New Ghost Stories	Tor Books	
2004	Jack Dann	Gathering the Bones	HarperCollins Voyager	
2004	Dennis Etchison	Gathering the Bones	HarperCollins Voyager	
2004	Ramsey Campbell	Gathering the Bones	HarperCollins Voyager	
2004	Jeff VanderMeer	The Thackery T. Lambshead Pocket Guide to Eccentric & Discredited Diseases	Night Shade Books	
2004	Mark Roberts	The Thackery T. Lambshead Pocket Guide to Eccentric & Discredited Diseases	Night Shade Books	
2004	Kelly Link	Trampoline: An Anthology	Small Beer Press	
2005	Barbara Roden*	Acquainted with the Night	Ash-Tree Press	
2005	Christopher Roden*	Acquainted with the Night	Ash-Tree Press	
2005	Sheree Thomas	Dark Matter: Reading the Bones	Warner Aspect	
2005	Ellen Datlow	The Faery Reel: Tales from the Twilight Realm	Viking Press	
2005	Terri Windling	The Faery Reel: Tales from the Twilight Realm	Viking Press	
2005	Harry Turtledove	The First Heroes: New Tales of the Bronze Age	Tor Books	
2005	Noreen Doyle	The First Heroes: New Tales of the Bronze Age	Tor Books	
2005	Deborah Layne	Polyphony, Volume 4	Wheatland Press	
2005	Jay Lake	Polyphony, Volume 4	Wheatland Press	
2006	Marvin Kaye*	The Fair Folk	Science Fiction Book Club	
2006	Chris Roberson	Adventure, Vol. 1	MonkeyBrain Books	
2006	Neil Williamson	Nova Scotia: New Scottish Speculative Fiction	Crescent Books	
2006	Andrew J. Wilson	Nova Scotia: New Scottish Speculative Fiction	Crescent Books	
2006	Deborah Layne	Polyphony, Volume 5	Wheatland Press	
2006	Jay Lake	Polyphony, Volume 5	Wheatland Press	
2006	Stephen Jones	Weird Shadows Over Innsmouth	Fedogan & Bremer	
2007	Ellen Datlow*	Salon Fantastique	Thunder's Mouth Press	
2007	Terri Windling*	Salon Fantastique	Thunder's Mouth Press	
2007	Scott A. Cupp	Cross Plains Universe: Texans Celebrate Robert E. Howard	MonkeyBrain Books	
2007	Joe R. Lansdale	Cross Plains Universe: Texans Celebrate Robert E. Howard	MonkeyBrain Books	
2007	Sharyn November	Firebirds Rising	Firebird Books	
2007	Joe R. Lansdale	Retro-Pulp Tales	Subterranean Press	
2007	David Moles	Twenty Epics	All-Star Stories	
2007	Susan Marie Groppi	Twenty Epics	All-Star Stories	
2008	Ellen Datlow*	Inferno	Tor Books	
2008	Ellen Datlow	The Coyote Road: Trickster Tales	Viking Press	
2008	Terri Windling	The Coyote Road: Trickster Tales	Viking Press	
2008	Gary A. Braunbeck	Five Strokes to Midnight	Haunted Pelican Press	
2008	Hank Schwaeble	Five Strokes to Midnight	Haunted Pelican Press	
2008	John Klima	Logorrhea	Bantam Spectra	
2008	Jack Dann	Wizards	Berkley Books	
2008	Gardner Dozois	Wizards	Berkley Books	
2009	Ekaterina Sedia*	Paper Cities: An Anthology of Urban Fantasy	Senses Five Press	
2009	Ellen Datlow	The Del Rey Book of Science Fiction and Fantasy	Del Rey Books	
2009	John Joseph Adams	The Living Dead	Night Shade Books	
2009	Ann VanderMeer	Steampunk	Tachyon Publications	
2009	Jeff VanderMeer	Steampunk	Tachyon Publications	
2009	Ellen Datlow	The Year's Best Fantasy and Horror 2008: Twenty-First Annual Collection	St. Martin's Press	
2009	Kelly Link	The Year's Best Fantasy and Horror 2008: Twenty-First Annual Collection	St. Martin's Press	
2009	Gavin Grant	The Year's Best Fantasy and Horror 2008: Twenty-First Annual Collection	St. Martin's Press	
2010	Peter Straub*	American Fantastic Tales: Terror and the Uncanny from Poe to the Pulps/from the 1940s to Now	Library of America	
2010	Jonathan Strahan	Eclipse Three	Night Shade Books	
2010	Danel Olson	Exotic Gothic 3: Strange Visitations	Ash-Tree Press	
2010	Ellen Datlow	Poe	Solaris Books	
2010	George R. R. Martin	Songs of the Dying Earth: Stories in Honor of Jack Vance	Subterranean Press, HarperCollins Voyager	
2010	Gardner Dozois	Songs of the Dying Earth: Stories in Honor of Jack Vance	Subterranean Press, HarperCollins Voyager	
2010	Gordon Van Gelder	The Very Best of Fantasy & Science Fiction: Sixtieth Anniversary Anthology	Tachyon Publications	
2011	Kate Bernheimer*	My Mother She Killed Me, My Father He Ate Me	Penguin Books	
2011	S. T. Joshi	Black Wings: New Tales of Lovecraftian Horror	PS Publishing	
2011	Ellen Datlow	Haunted Legends	Tor Books	
2011	Nick Mamatas	Haunted Legends	Tor Books	
2011	Neil Gaiman	Stories: All-New Tales	William Morrow and Company, Headline Review	
2011	Al Sarrantonio	Stories: All-New Tales	William Morrow and Company, Headline Review	
2011	Jonathan Strahan	Swords & Dark Magic	Eos	
2011	Lou Anders	Swords & Dark Magic	Eos	
2011	John Joseph Adams	The Way of the Wizard	Prime Books	
2012	Ann VanderMeer*	The Weird	Corvus, Tor Books	
2012	Jeff VanderMeer*	The Weird	Corvus, Tor Books	
2012	Ellen Datlow	Blood and Other Cravings	Tor Books	
2012	Stephen Jones	A Book of Horrors	Jo Fletcher Books	
2012	Conrad Williams	Gutshot	PS Publishing	
2012	Ann VanderMeer	The Thackery T. Lambshead Cabinet of Curiosities	Harper Voyager	
2012	Jeff VanderMeer	The Thackery T. Lambshead Cabinet of Curiosities	Harper Voyager	
2013	Danel Olson*	Postscripts #28/#29: Exotic Gothic 4	PS Publishing	
2013	John Joseph Adams	Epic: Legends of Fantasy	Tachyon Publications	
2013	Jonathan Oliver	Magic: An Anthology of the Esoteric and Arcane	Solaris Books	
2013	Eduardo Jiménez Mayo	Three Messages and a Warning: Contemporary Mexican Short Stories of the Fantastic	Small Beer Press	
2013	Chris N. Brown	Three Messages and a Warning: Contemporary Mexican Short Stories of the Fantastic	Small Beer Press	
2013	Jonathan Strahan	Under My Hat: Tales from the Cauldron	Random House	
2014	George R. R. Martin*	Dangerous Women	Tor Books, Voyager	
2014	Gardner Dozois*	Dangerous Women	Tor Books, Voyager	
2014	Jonathan Oliver	End of the Road	Solaris Books	
2014	Jonathan Strahan	Fearsome Journeys: The New Solaris Book of Fantasy	Solaris Books	
2014	Stephen Jones	Flotsam Fantastique: The Souvenir Book of World Fantasy Convention 2013	Smith & Jones, PS Publishing	
2014	Ellen Datlow	Queen Victoria's Book of Spells	Tor Books	
2014	Terri Windling	Queen Victoria's Book of Spells	Tor Books	
2014	Kate Bernheimer	xo Orpheus: Fifty New Myths	Penguin Books	
2015	Kelly Link*	Monstrous Affections: An Anthology of Beastly Tales	Candlewick Press	
2015	Gavin J. Grant*	Monstrous Affections: An Anthology of Beastly Tales	Candlewick Press	
2015	Ellen Datlow	Fearful Symmetries	ChiZine Publications	
2015	Gardner Dozois	Rogues	Bantam Books	
2015	George R. R. Martin	Rogues	Bantam Books	
2015	Rose Fox	Long Hidden: Speculative Fiction from the Margins of History	Crossed Genres	
2015	[[Daniel José Older|Daniel José Older]]	Long Hidden: Speculative Fiction from the Margins of History	Crossed Genres	
2015	Michael Kelly	Shadows & Tall Trees	Undertow Publications	
2016	Silvia Moreno-Garcia*	She Walks in Shadows	Innsmouth Free Press	
2016	Paula R. Stiles*	She Walks in Shadows	Innsmouth Free Press	
2016	Simon Strantzas	Aickman's Heirs	Undertow Publications	
2016	S. T. Joshi	Black Wings IV	PS Publishing	
2016	Joseph S. Pulver, Sr.	Cassilda's Song	Chaosium	
2016	Ellen Datlow	The Doll Collection	Tor Books	
2017	Jack Dann*	Dreaming in the Dark	PS Australia	
2017	Karen Joy Fowler	The Best American Science Fiction and Fantasy 2016	Mariner Books	
2017	John Joseph Adams	The Best American Science Fiction and Fantasy 2016	Mariner Books	
2017	Ellen Datlow	Children of Lovecraft	Dark Horse Comics	
2017	Mike Allen	Clockwork Phoenix 5	Mythic Delirium	
2017	Dominik Parisien	The Starlit Wood	Saga Press	
2017	Navah Wolfe	The Starlit Wood	Saga Press	
2018	Peter S. Beagle*	The New Voices of Fantasy	Tachyon Publications	
2018	Jacob Weisman*	The New Voices of Fantasy	Tachyon Publications	
2018	Ellen Datlow	Black Feathers: Dark Avian Tales	Pegasus Books	
2018	Gardner Dozois	The Book of Swords	Bantam Books	
2018	Mahvesh Murad	The Djinn Falls in Love and Other Stories	Solaris Books	
2018	Jared Shurin	The Djinn Falls in Love and Other Stories	Solaris Books	
2018	William Schafer	The Best of Subterranean	Subterranean Press	
2019	Irene Gallo*	Worlds Seen in Passing	Tor.com Publishing	
2019	Stephen Jones	Best New Horror 28	Drugstore Indian	
2019	Gardner Dozois	The Book of Magic	Bantam Books	
2019	Dominik Parisien	Robots vs Fairies	Saga Press	
2019	Navah Wolfe	Robots vs Fairies	Saga Press	
2019	Aidan Doyle	Sword and Sonnet	Ate Bit Bear	
2019	Rachael K. Jones	Sword and Sonnet	Ate Bit Bear	
2019	E. Catherine Tobler	Sword and Sonnet	Ate Bit Bear	
2020	Nisi Shawl*	New Suns: Original Speculative Fiction by People of Color	Solaris Books	
2020	Ann VanderMeer	The Big Book of Classic Fantasy	Vintage Books	
2020	Jeff VanderMeer	The Big Book of Classic Fantasy	Vintage Books	
2020	Ellen Datlow	Echoes: The Saga Anthology of Ghost Stories	Saga Press	
2020	Dominik Parisien	The Mythic Dream	Saga Press	
2020	Navah Wolfe	The Mythic Dream	Saga Press	
2020	Mahvesh Murad	The Outcast Hours	Solaris Books	
2020	Jared Shurin	The Outcast Hours	Solaris Books	
2021	Ann VanderMeer*	The Big Book of Modern Fantasy	Vintage Books	
2021	Jeff VanderMeer*	The Big Book of Modern Fantasy	Vintage Books	
2021	Jonathan Strahan	The Book of Dragons	Harper Voyager	
2021	Ellen Datlow	Edited By	Subterranean Press	
2021	Michael Kelly	Shadows & Tall Trees 8	Undertow Publications	
2021	James D. Jenkins	The Valencourt Book of World Horror Stories, Vol. 1	Valancourt Books	
2021	Ryan Cagle	The Valencourt Book of World Horror Stories, Vol. 1	Valancourt Books	
2022	Oghenechovwe Donald Ekpeki*	The Year's Best African Speculative Fiction (2021)	Jembefola Press	
2022	Charlatan Bardot	Professor Charlatan Bardot's Travel Anthology to the Most (Fictional) Haunted Buildings in the Weird, Wild World (2021 Edition)	Dark Moon Books	
2022	Eric J. Guignard	Professor Charlatan Bardot's Travel Anthology to the Most (Fictional) Haunted Buildings in the Weird, Wild World (2021 Edition)	Dark Moon Books	
2022	Alex Hernandez	Speculative Fiction for Dreamers: A Latinx Anthology	Mad Creek Books	
2022	Matthew David Goodwin	Speculative Fiction for Dreamers: A Latinx Anthology	Mad Creek Books	
2022	Sarah Rafael García	Speculative Fiction for Dreamers: A Latinx Anthology	Mad Creek Books	
2022	Ellen Datlow	When Things Get Dark: Stories Inspired by Shirley Jackson	Titan Books	
2022	Paula Guran	The Year's Best Dark Fantasy & Horror Volume Two	Pyr	
2023	Sheree Thomas*	Africa Risen: A New Era of Speculative Fiction	Tordotcom	
2023	Oghenechovwe Donald Ekpeki*	Africa Risen: A New Era of Speculative Fiction	Tordotcom	
2023	Zelda Knight*	Africa Risen: A New Era of Speculative Fiction	Tordotcom	
2023	John F. D. Taff	Dark Stars: New Tales of Darkest Horror	Nightfire Books	
2023	Vince A. Liaguno	Other Terrors: An Inclusive Anthology	William Morrow and Company	
2023	Ren Mason	Other Terrors: An Inclusive Anthology	William Morrow and Company	
2023	Ellen Datlow	Screams from the Dark: 29 Tales of Monsters and the Monstrous	Nightfire Books	
2023	Sheree Thomas	Trouble the Waters: Tales from the Deep Blue	Third Man Books	
2023	Pan Morigan	Trouble the Waters: Tales from the Deep Blue	Third Man Books	
2023	Troy L. Wiggins	Trouble the Waters: Tales from the Deep Blue	Third Man Books	
2024	Jonathan Strahan*	The Book of Witches	Harper Voyager	
2024	R. F. Kuang	The Best American Science Fiction and Fantasy 2023	Mariner Books	
2024	John Joseph Adams	The Best American Science Fiction and Fantasy 2023	Mariner Books	
2024	Ellen Datlow	Christmas and Other Horrors	Titan UK	
2024	Jordan Peele	Out There Screaming: An Anthology of New Black Horror	Random House/Picador	
2024	John Joseph Adams	Out There Screaming: An Anthology of New Black Horror	Random House/Picador	
2024	Stephen Kotowych	Year's Best Canadian Fantasy & Science Fiction: Volume One	Ansible Press	
2025	Dan Coxon*	Heartwood	Drugstore Indian	
2025	Carol Gyzander	Discontinue If Death Ensues	Flame Tree Publishing	
2025	Anna Taborska	Discontinue If Death Ensues	Flame Tree Publishing	
2025	Michael Kelly	Northern Nights	Undertow Publications	
2025	Nate Pedersen	The Dagon Collection	PS Publishing	
2025	Dave Ring	The Crawling Moon: Queer Tales of Inescapable Dread	Neon Hemlock	
2026	Julie C. Day*	Storyteller: A Tanith Lee Tribute Anthology	Essential Dreams	
2026	Carina Bissett*	Storyteller: A Tanith Lee Tribute Anthology	Essential Dreams	
2026	Craig Laurance Gidney*	Storyteller: A Tanith Lee Tribute Anthology	Essential Dreams	
2026	Ellen Datlow	Night & Day	Saga Press	
2026	Michael Kelly	The Best Weird Fiction of the Year: Volume 1	Undertow Publications	
2026	Stephen Kotowych	Year's Best Canadian Fantasy & Science Fiction: Volume Three	Ansible Press	
2026	Hollie Starling	Bog People: A Working-Class Anthology of Folk Horror	Chatto & Windus	
