= Africa Risen =

2022 speculative fiction anthology

- Editor: Oghenechovwe Donald Ekpeki; Sheree Renée Thomas; Zelda Knight
- Cover artist: Manzi Jackson
- Language: English
- Subject: Anthology series
- Genre: Science fiction anthology, Speculative fiction, essays, postmodern lit, literary fiction
- Publisher: Tordotcom
- Publication date: 15 November 2022
- Publication place: United States of America
- Media type: Hardcover; e-Book
- Pages: 528 (hardcover)
- ISBN: 9781250833006 hardcover
- Preceded by: A Century of Speculative Fiction from the African Diaspora

Africa Risen: A New Era of Speculative Fiction is a speculative fiction anthology edited by Sheree Renée Thomas, Zelda Knight, and Oghenechovwe Donald Ekpeki featuring 32 original works of fiction. It was published in 2022 by Tor Publishing.

== Development and inspiration ==
The anthology serves as a third volume to the Dark Matter anthology series edited by Thomas from 1998 to 2004. The first book published in this Dark Matter anthology was produced at the turn of the new millennium, the award winning A Century of Speculative Fiction from the African Diaspora (2000). The second book in the Dark Matter series was the equally lauded World Fantasy Award for Best Anthology winner, Reading the Bones (2004).

According to Thomas, Dominion: An Anthology of Speculative Fiction From Africa and the African Diaspora re-kindled the desire to edit an anthology of Africans and Africans in the Diaspora when Ekpeki reached out to her. The name of the anthology was supposed to be Africa Rising, but was changed because according to Thomas "Africa has risen".

== Content ==
- "The Blue House" by Dilman Dila
- "March Magic" by WC Dunlap
- "IRL" by Steven Barnes
- "The Deification of Igodo" by Joshua Omenga
- "Mami Wataworks" by Russell Nichols
- "Rear Mirror" by Nuzo Onoh
- "Door Crashers" by Franka Zeph
- "The Soul Would Have No Rainbow" by Yvette Lisa Ndlovu
- "A Dream of Electric Mothers" by Wole Talabi
- "Simbi" by Sandra Jackson-Opoku
- "Housewarming for a Lion Goddess" by Aline-Mwezi Niyonsenga
- "A Knight in Tunisia" by Alex Jennings
- "The Devil Is Us" by Mirette Bahgat
- "Cloud Mine" by Timi Odueso
- "Ruler of the Rear Guard" by Maurice Broaddus
- "Peeling Time (Deluxe Edition)" by Tlotlo Tsamaase
- "The Sugar Mill" by Tobias S. Buckell
- "The Carving of War" by Somto Ihezue Onyedikachi
- "Ghost Ship" by Tananarive Due
- "Liquid Twilight" by Ytasha Womack
- "Once Upon a Time in 1967" by Oyedotun Damilola Muees
- "A Girl Crawls in a Dark Corner" by Alexis Brooks de Vita
- "The Lady of the Yellow-Painted Library" by Tobi Ogundiran
- "When the Mami Wata Met a Demon" by Moustapha Mbacké Diop
- "The Papermakers" by Akua Lezli Hope
- "A Soul of Small Places" by Mame Bougouma Diene and Woppa Diallo
- "Air to Shape Lungs" by Shingai Njeri Kagunda
- "Hanfo Driver" by Ada Nnadi
- "Exiles of Witchery" by Ivana Akotowaa Ofori
- "The Taloned Beast" by Chinelo Onwualu
- "Star Watchers" by Danian Darrell Jerry
- "Biscuit & Milk" by Dare Segun Falowo

== Themes ==
The themes in the anthology are Afrofuturism, Africanfuturism, climate, gender, LGBT and religion.

== Reception ==
It is nominated for the 2023 NAACP Image Awards for Outstanding Literary Work – Fiction. NPR named it amongst their Best of the Year pick. It earned a starred review from Publishers Weekly and Booklist. In the Publishers Weekly review, it was called "a magnificent and wide-ranging anthology..." noting that it is "a must-read for all genre fans."

Booklist called it "a significant addition to the canon of modern speculative fiction." while Library Journal considered it "a welcome introduction to speculative writers from the African continent and the African diaspora." Isiah Lavender III in a review for Locus praised the work for an outstanding collection.

It won the 2023 Locus Award for Best Anthology.

== See also ==
- Africanfuturism
- Afrofuturism
- Black science fiction
- Dark Matter: A Century of Speculative Fiction from the African Diaspora
- Africa Rising concept
- Samuel R. Delany
