= Mojo: Conjure Stories =

Anthology edited by Nalo Hopkinson

- First edition cover for Mojo: Conjure Stories
- Author: Nalo Hopkinson
- Original title: Mojo: Conjure Stories
- Cover artist: Julie Metz
- Language: English
- Genre: Fantasy, Horror
- Publisher: Warner Aspect
- Publication date: 2003
- Publication place: United States
- Media type: Print (paperback)
- Pages: 352 pp
- ISBN: 978-0-446-67929-9
- OCLC: 50669812
- Dewey Decimal: 813/.0108896073 21
- LC Class: PS647.A35 M65 2003

Mojo: Conjure Stories is an anthology of fantasy and horror short stories, edited by the writer Nalo Hopkinson and published in 2003.

== Stories ==
- Andy Duncan, Daddy Mention and the Monday Skull
- Kiini Ibura Salaam, Rosamojo
- Barth Anderson, Lark till Dawn, Princess
- Steven Barnes, Heartspace
- Gregory Frost, The Prowl
- Jenise Aminoff, Fate
- Tananarive Due, Trial Day
- Jarla Tangh, The Skinned
- Tobias S. Buckell, Death's Dreadlocks
- Nnedima Okorafor, Asuquo, or The Winds of Harmattan
- Barbara Hambly, The Horsemen and the Morning Star
- Gerard Houarner, She'd Make a Dead Man Crawl
- A. M. Dellamonica, Cooking Creole
- Eliot Fintushel, White Man’s Trick
- Nisi Shawl, The Tawny Bitch
- Neil Gaiman, Bitter Grounds
- Devorah Major, Shining through 24/7
- Marcia Douglas, Notes from a Writer’s Book of Cures and Spells
- Sheree Renee Thomas, How Sukie Cross de Big Wata
