= Oghenechovwe Donald Ekpeki =

Nigerian speculative fiction author

- Born: 19 January; Ughelli, Delta State, Nigeria
- Education: University of Lagos, Lagos
- Occupation: Author
- Writing career
- Years active: 2018–present
- Genres: Science fiction, fantasy, horror
- Notable work: Ife-Iyoku, the Tale of Imadeyunuagbon
- Notable awards: Nommo Award; Nebula Award; World Fantasy Award; British Fantasy Award; Otherwise Award

Oghenechovwe Donald Ekpeki (born 19 January) is a Nigerian speculative fiction writer, editor and publisher who was the first African-born Black author to win a Nebula Award. He has also received a World Fantasy Award, British Fantasy Award, Otherwise Award, and two Nommo Awards, along with being a multi-time finalist for a number of other honors, including the Hugo Award.

Ekpeki frequently writes about disability, class, inequality and other issues related to both colonization and decolonization. He also coined the term afropantheology, which is a distinct genre of speculative fiction "conceived to capture the gamut of African works which, though having fantasy elements, are additionally imbued with African spiritual realities."

== Life ==
Ekpeki was born in Ughelli, Delta State, Nigeria. He studied law at the University of Lagos.

In November 2024, Locus magazine reported that "allegations of unethical and unprofessional behavior by Ekpeki" had recently been made public and that the Science Fiction and Fantasy Writers Association had removed him from their board of directors.

In December 2024, Locus followed up the report with updates from File 770 and The African Speculative Fiction Society, that Ekpeki had been found innocent of the allegations, following further investigations and retractions.

In May 2026, he was involved in a near-fatal accident caused by a Chowdeck rider. He later claimed that both he and his fellow victim, Purity Adheke, were threatened by the logistics company.

== Writing ==
Ekpeki began publishing fiction in 2018. One of his early stories, "The Witching Hour", won the Nommo Award. His 2020 novella Ife-Iyoku, the Tale of Imadeyunuagbon won the Otherwise Award and Nommo Award, along with being a finalist for the BSFA Award for Best Short Fiction, Theodore Sturgeon Award, and Nebula Award for Best Novella.

In 2021, Ekpeki's climate fiction novelette "O2 Arena" was published in Galaxy's Edge magazine and received the Nebula Award for Best Novelette, making him the first African-born Black author to be so honored. The novelette was also a finalist for the Hugo Award for Best Novelette. This Is Africa described the story as a "biopolitical dystopia in which oxygen has become a commodity, with all the possible class implications." His 2022 short story "Destiny Delayed", published in Asimov's Science Fiction magazine, was a finalist for the 2022 Nebula Award for Best Short Story.

Ekpeki and Joshua Uchenna Omenga's book Between Dystopias: The Road to Afropantheology focuses on the "study of African (and African-descended) religions, gods, and the bodies of knowledge associated with them". The book contains thirteen stories and three essays "exploring the belief systems and lived experiences that inform African speculative fiction" and the "schism between Western and African perspectives on speculative fiction".

Ekpeki's fiction and non-fiction have also appeared in Omenana Magazine, Cosmic Roots and Eldritch Shores, Tor.com, Strange Horizons, Uncanny Magazine, NBC and other places. He is a member of the African Speculative Fiction Society, the Science Fiction and Fantasy Writers Association, the Horror Writers Association, and Codex Writers Group.

== Editing ==
Ekpeki has edited a number of books and magazines, starting with the 2020 anthology Dominion: An Anthology of Speculative Fiction From Africa and the African Diaspora (co-edited with Zelda Knight). The anthology won the British Fantasy Award for Best Anthology and was a finalist for the 2021 Locus Award and the 2020 This Is Horror award.

Ekpeki also edited The Year's Best African Speculative Fiction and published it through his own Jembefola Press in 2021. In 2022, he edited and published Bridging Worlds: Global Conversations On Creating Pan-African Speculative Literature In a Pandemic. The anthology was a finalist for the Locus Award for Non-Fiction.

In 2022 he co-edited the Tor Books anthology Africa Risen: A New Era of Speculative Fiction alongside Sheree Renée Thomas and Knight. The anthology won the 2023 Locus Award and was a finalist for the 2023 NAACP Image Award for Outstanding Literary Work – Fiction.

He has also edited individual issues of Invictus Quarterly and Interstellar Flight Press.

Ekpeki has been a multi-time finalist in the editing category for the Hugo Award for Best Professional Editor and Locus Award.

== Awards and nominations ==
Year	Title	Award	Category	Result	Ref
2019	"The Witching Hour"	Nommo Award	Short Story	Won	
2020	Ife-Iyoku, the Tale of Imadeyunuagbon	Nommo Award	Short Story	Longlisted	
2020	Ife-Iyoku, the Tale of Imadeyunuagbon	BSFA Award	Short Fiction	Nominated	
2020	Ife-Iyoku, the Tale of Imadeyunuagbon	Nebula Award	Novella	Nominated	
2020	Ife-Iyoku, the Tale of Imadeyunuagbon	Otherwise Award	—	Won	
2021	Ife-Iyoku, the Tale of Imadeyunuagbon	Nommo Award	Novella	Won	
2021	Dominion: An Anthology of Speculative Fiction From Africa and the African Diaspora	British Fantasy Award	Anthology	Won	
2021	Dominion: An Anthology of Speculative Fiction From Africa and the African Diaspora	Locus Award	Anthology	Nominated	
2021	Ife-Iyoku, the Tale of Imadeyunuagbon	Theodore Sturgeon Award	Short fiction	Nominated	
2022	"O2 Arena"	Nebula Award	Novelette	Won	
2022	"O2 Arena"	Hugo Award	Novelette	Nominated	
2022	The Year's Best African Speculative Fiction	World Fantasy Award	Anthology	Won	
2022	—N/a	Hugo Award	Editor, Short Form	Nominated	
2023	"Destiny Delayed"	Nebula Award	Short Story	Nominated	
2023	"Destiny Delayed"	Asimov's Readers' Award	Short Story	Won	

== Bibliography ==
=== Collections ===
- Ekpeki, Oghenechovwe Donald; Omenga, Joshua Uchenna (24 October 2023). Between Dystopias: The Road to Afropantheology. CAEZIK SF & Fantasy. ISBN 9781647100841.

=== Short stories and novellas ===
- — (2018). "The Witching Hour". Cosmic Roots and Eldritch Shores.
- — (21 August 2019). "Ife-Iyoku, the Tale of Imadeyunuagbon". Selene Quarterly Magazine. Vol. 2, no. 2.
- — (August 2020). "The Mannequin Challenge". Omenana Magazine. No. 15.
- — (28 September 2020). "Attack on University of Lagos, Law Faculty". In Kurtz, Nicole Givens (ed.). Slay: Stories of the Vampire Noire. Mocha Memoirs Press. ISBN 9781735219554.
- — (November 2021). "O2 Arena". Galaxy's Edge. No. 53.
- — (May–June 2022). "Destiny Delayed". Asimov's Science Fiction.
- Ihezue, Somto; Ekpeki, Oghenechovwe Donald (21 November 2023). "A City, a Desert, and All Their Dirges". In Talabi, Wole (ed.). Mothersound: The Sauútiverse Anthology. Android Press. ISBN 9781958121603.

=== Anthologies ===
- Ekpeki, Oghenechovwe Donald; Knight, Zelda, eds. (17 August 2020). Dominion: An Anthology of Speculative Fiction From Africa and the African Diaspora. Aurelia Leo. ISBN 9781946024893.
- —, ed. (21 September 2021). The Year's Best African Speculative Fiction (2021). Jembefola Press. ISBN 9781647100742.
- —, ed. (21 February 2022). Bridging Worlds: Global Conversations on Creating Pan-African Speculative Literature in a Pandemic. Jembefola Press. ASIN B0DM4WR9VY.
- Thomas, Sheree Renée; Ekpeki, Oghenechovwe Donald; Knight, Zelda, eds. (15 November 2022). Africa Risen: A New Era of Speculative Fiction. New York: Tordotcom. ISBN 9781250833006.
