= New Suns: Original Speculative Fiction by People of Color =

2019 speculative fiction anthology edited by Nisi Shawl

- Editor: Nisi Shawl
- Language: English
- Series: New Suns
- Publisher: Solaris Books
- Publication date: 18 Mar 2019
- Publication place: United States
- Awards: British Fantasy Award for Best Anthology; Ignyte Award for Outstanding Anthology/Collected Works; Locus Award for Best Anthology; World Fantasy Award-Anthology
- ISBN: 9781781086384
- Followed by: New Suns 2: Original Speculative Fiction by People of Color

New Suns: Original Speculative Fiction by People of Color is a 2019 speculative fiction anthology edited by Nisi Shawl. The anthology received critical acclaim, winning the 2020 British Fantasy Award, Ignyte Award, Locus Award, and World Fantasy Award, all in the anthology and/or collected works category.

The title is taken from a quote by Octavia E. Butler: "There's nothing new under the sun, but there are new suns."

== Contents ==
1. "The Galactic Tourist Industrial Complex" by Tobias S. Buckell
2. "Deer Dancer" by Kathleen Alcalá
3. "The Virtue of Unfaithful Translations" by Minsoo Kang
4. "Come Home to Atropos" by Steven Barnes
5. "The Fine Print" by Chinelo Onwualu
6. "unkind of mercy" by Alex Jennings
7. "Burn the Ships" by Alberto Yáñez
8. "The Freedom of the Shifting Sea" by Jaymee Goh
9. "Three Variations on a Theme of Imperial Attire" by E. Lily Yu
10. "Blood and Bells" by Karin Lowachee
11. "Give Me Your Black Wings Oh Sister" by Silvia Moreno-Garcia
12. "The Shadow We Cast Through Time" by Indrapramit Das
13. "The Robots of Eden" by Anil Menon
14. "Dumb House" by Andrea Hairston
15. "One Easy Trick" by Hiromi Goto
16. "Harvest" by Rebecca Roanhorse
17. "Kelsey and the Burdened Breath" by Darcie Little Badger

== Reception and awards ==
Writing for Locus, Rich Horton praised the anthology, particularly the science fiction stories. Horton wrote that the strongest entries included "The Fine Print", "The Shadow We Cast Through Time", and "The Robots of Eden". The review praised the diversity of the selected authors, noting the value of "different histories, both personal and cultural, in informing the imagination." Horton concluded the review by calling the book one of the best original anthologies of the year.

John Rieder of Los Angeles Review of Books called the book a "varied, rich, and delightful collection". Rieder examined the way in which the SFF literary community has become more diverse over the previous decades, beginning with Clarion West Writers Workshops of the 1990s and the publication of the Dark Matter anthologies in 2000. Rieder commented upon the way the genre has become more inclusive for women and writers of color, changing the genre for the better. Rieder noted that the stories included significant diversity of themes and genres, but commented that several stories examined colonialism from the perspective of authors of color.

Cynthia C. Scott reviewed the anthology in Strange Horizons, also noting that the book follows in the footsteps of Dark Matter and later anthologies of authors of color. Scott noted that the fantasy stories were stronger than the science fiction offerings, but praised the breadth of themes explored in the collection: "race, gender, sexual orientation, and culture; there is literally something here for everyone."

Mahvesh Murad of Reactor noted that the anthology is presented without an overarching theme, but that many stories examine the notion of "otherness". Murash noted that some of the stories don't fully explore this theme, perhaps because of a lack of authorial skill or the small word count imposed by the short story medium. The review particularly praised several of the stories, including "Galactic Tourist Industrial Complex", "Harvest", "Give Me Your Black Wings Oh Sister", and "Come Home to Atropos". The review concluded that despite the uneven quality of the stories, which is something that is seen in any anthology, the idea of collecting stories from authors of color is commendable. The reviewer stated that the publishing industry should feature more authors of color in the future, so that readers would not have to purposefully seek them out to experience their work.

Year	Award	Category	Result	Ref.
2020	British Fantasy Award	Anthology	Won	
2020	Ignyte Award	Anthology/Collected Works	Won	
2020	Locus Award	Anthology	Won	
2020	World Fantasy Award	Anthology	Won	
