= Filter house =

Filter house may refer to:

- French house, a type of house music
- Filter House, a novel by Nisi Shawl
