= Dark Matter (prose anthologies) =

Book series by Sheree Thomas

Dark Matter is an anthology series of science fiction, fantasy, and horror stories and essays produced by people of African descent. The editor of the series is Sheree Thomas. The first book in the series, Dark Matter: A Century of Speculative Fiction from the African Diaspora (2000), won the 2001 World Fantasy Award for Best Anthology. The second book in the Dark Matter series, Dark Matter: Reading the Bones (2004), won the World Fantasy Award for Best Anthology in 2005. A forthcoming third book in the series was finally published at the end of 2022 under the title Africa Risen: A New Era of Speculative Fiction, from Tor Books.

In the introduction to the first book, the editor explains that the title alludes to cosmological "dark matter", an invisible yet essential part of the universe, to highlight how black people's contributions have been ignored: "They became dark matter, invisible to the naked eye; and yet their influence — their gravitational pull on the world around them — would become undeniable".

== Book I contents ==
Dark Matter: A Century of Speculative Fiction from the African Diaspora
- Cover of first edition (hardcover)
- Author: Sheree R. Thomas
- Language: English
- Subject: Anthology series
- Genre: Science fiction anthology, Speculative fiction, essays, postmodern lit, literary fiction
- Publisher: Warner Aspect
- Publication date: 2000
- Publication place: United States
- Media type: Print (hardback & paperback)
- Pages: 448 pp
- ISBN: 978-0-446-52583-1 (first edition, hardcover)
- OCLC: 43385283
- Dewey Decimal: 813/.087609896073 21
- LC Class: PS648.S3 D37 2000
- Followed by: Africa Risen: A New Era of Speculative Fiction

=== Stories ===
- Samuel R. Delany, "Aye, and Gomorrah..."
- Octavia E. Butler, "The Evening and the Morning and the Night"
- Charles R. Saunders, "Gimmile's Songs"
- Steven Barnes, "The Woman in the Wall"
- Tananarive Due, "Like Daughter"
- Jewelle Gomez, "Chicago 1927"
- George S. Schuyler, "Black No More" (excerpt from the novel)
- Ishmael Reed, "Future Christmas" (novel excerpt)
- Kalamu ya Salaam, "Can You Wear My Eyes"
- Robert Fleming, "The Astral Visitor Delta Blues"
- Nalo Hopkinson, "Ganger (Ball Lightning)"
- W. E. B. Du Bois, "The Comet"
- Linda Addison, "Twice, at Once, Separated"
- Honorée Fanonne Jeffers, "Sister Lilith"
- Evie Shockley, "separation anxiety"
- Leone Ross, "Tasting Songs"
- Nalo Hopkinson, "Greedy Choke Puppy"
- Amiri Baraka, "Rhythm Travel"
- Kalamu ya Salaam, "Buddy Bolden"
- Akua Lezli Hope, "The Becoming"
- Charles W. Chesnutt, "The Goophered Grapevine"
- Nisi Shawl, "At the Huts of Ajala"
- Henry Dumas, "Ark of Bones"
- Tony Medina, "Butta's Backyard Barbecue"
- Kiini Ibura Salaam, "At Life's Limits"
- Anthony Joseph, "The African Origins of UFOs" (excerpt from the novel)
- Derrick Bell, "The Space Traders"
- Darryl A. Smith, "The Pretended"
- Ama Patterson, "Hussy Strutt"

=== Essays ===
- Samuel R. Delany, "Racism and Science Fiction"
- Charles R. Saunders, "Why Blacks Should Read (and Write) Science Fiction"
- Walter Mosley, "Black to the Future"
- Paul D. Miller, a.k.a. DJ Spooky That Subliminal Kid, "Yet Do I Wonder"
- Octavia E. Butler, "The Monophobic Response"

=== Reviews ===
- The New York Times Review by Gerald Jonas (2000)
- Scifi.com Review by Joe Monti, Issue 167 (July 2000)
- Arnold, Martin (June 15, 2000). "MAKING BOOKS; Science Fiction, A Black Natural". New York Times.
- Steven Silver's Review
- Jenkins, Candice M. (Winter 2000). "A Century of Speculative Fiction from the African Diaspora. - Review". African American Review. 34 (4). Archived from the original on January 22, 2008 – via FindArticles.
- Locus Magazine Review by Gary K. Wolfe (July 2000)
- Locus Magazine Review by Faren Miller (June 2000)
- Washington Science Fiction Association (WSFA) Journal Review by Colleen R. Cahill (November 2001)
- Science Fiction Studies at DePauw University Review by Isiah Lavender III (March 2001)
- SF Site Featured Review by Greg L. Johnson (2001)
- A.V. Club Review by Tasha Robinson (2002)

=== Awards ===
- 2001 World Fantasy Award for Best Anthology
- 2000 New York Times Notable Book of the Year
- Best SF and Fantasy Books of 2000: Editors' Choice, Honourable Mention

== Book II contents ==
Dark Matter: Reading the Bones
- Cover of first edition (hardcover)
- Author: Sheree R. Thomas
- Language: English
- Genre: Science fiction novel
- Publisher: Warner Aspect
- Publication date: 2004
- Publication place: United States
- Media type: Print (hardback & paperback)
- Pages: 416 pp
- ISBN: 978-0-446-69377-6 (first edition, paperback)

=== Stories ===
- Ihsan Bracy, "ibo landing"
- Cherene Sherrard, "The Quality of Sand"
- Charles R. Saunders, "Yahimba's Choice"
- Nalo Hopkinson, "The Glass Bottle Trick"
- Kiini Ibura Salaam, "Desire"
- David Findlay, "Recovery from a Fall"
- Douglas Kearney, "Anansi Meets Peter Parker at the Taco Bell on Lexington"
- Nnedi Okorafor-Mbachu, "The Magical Negro"
- W. E. B. Du Bois, "Jesus Christ in Texas"
- Henry Dumas, "Will the Circle Be Unbroken?"
- Kevin Brockenbrough, "'Cause Harlem Needs Heroes"
- Pam Noles, "Whipping Boy"
- Ibi Aanu Zoboi, "Old Flesh Song"
- Walter Mosley, "Whispers in the Dark"
- Tananarive Due, "Aftermoon"
- Tyehimba Jess, "Voodoo Vincent and the Astrostoriograms"
- John S. Cooley, "The Binary"
- Jill Robinson, "BLACKout"
- Charles Johnson, "Sweet Dreams"
- Wanda Coleman, "Buying Primo Time"
- Samuel R. Delany, "Corona"
- Nisi Shawl, "Maggies"
- Andrea Hairston, "Mindscape" (novel excerpt)
- Kalamu ya Salaam, "Trance"

=== Essays ===
- Jewelle Gomez, "The Second Law of Thermodynamics"
- Nnedi Okorafor-Mbachu, "Her Pen Could Fly: Remembering Virginia Hamilton"
- Carol Cooper, "Celebrating the Alien: The Politics of Race and Species in the Juveniles of Andre Norton"

=== Reviews ===
- Locus Magazine Review by Gary K. Wolfe (November 2003)
- Locus Magazine Review by Faren Miller (December 2003)
- SF Site Featured Review by Steven H Silver (2004)
- Scifi.com Review by Pamela Sargent, Issue 354 (2004)
- ChickenBones Literary Journal Review
- BookLoons Review by Martina Bexte (2004)
- Curled Up With a Good Book Review by Brian Charles Clark (2004)
- Austin Chronicle Review by Belinda Acosta (2005)

=== Awards ===
- 2005 World Fantasy Award nominee for Best Anthology

== See also ==
- Africanfuturism
- Afrofuturism
- Black science fiction
- Africa Risen: A New Era of Speculative Fiction
- Nisi Shawl
- Samuel R. Delany
