= Kiini Ibura Salaam =

American writer

- Born: 1973 (age 52–53); New Orleans, Louisiana, U.S.
- Writing career
- Genres: Science fiction, fantasy
- Website: www.kiiniibura.com

Kiini Ibura Salaam (born 1973) is an American essayist, science fiction and fantasy short story writer, and painter. Her short story collection Ancient, Ancient won the James Tiptree, Jr. Award for 2012.

She is the daughter of writer and activist Kalamu ya Salaam.

== Works ==
=== Short story collections ===
- Ancient, Ancient (Aqueduct Press, 2012)
- When the World Wounds (Third Man Books, 2016)

=== Anthologies and essays ===
- Dark Matter
- Dark Matter II: Reading the Bones
- Mojo: Conjure Stories
- Colonize This!: Young Women of Color on Today's Feminism
- Best Black Women's Erotica 2

== Awards ==
- 2012 James Tiptree, Jr. Award for Ancient, Ancient

== See also ==
- Afrofuturism
- Black science fiction
