= Robert Fleming (author) =

Robert Fleming is an American journalist and writer of erotic fiction and horror fiction. He is also a contributing editor for Black Issues Book Review. He began writing in the early 1970s while studying full-time for a degree in psychology at a local college.

His first writing job was in 1977 as an associate editor at Encore Magazine, a pioneering black newsmagazine that dealt with current events, and hard journalism. His writings included investigative reports and it was one such investigation—about the life of rural black farmers in the Deep South—that brought Fleming notice and led to a scholarship to Columbia University’s School of Journalism.

After leaving the School of Journalism, he worked with former CBS News president Fred Friendly, former boss of the legendary Edward R. Morrow, as a staff writer for the PBS TV show Media and Society, a program that brought together panels of prominent people, politics, religious, cultural, legal, and discussed the issues of the day. The series was televised on PBS in the 1980s and 1990s. This led to a job as a reporter at The New York Daily News throughout the 1980s and into the early '90s. As a reporter, he earned a New York Press Club, a Revson Fellowship and several other honors. At the end of 1991, Fleming turned from the grueling work of hard journalism in order to write and teach.

He still continued his journalistic writings and his work has appeared in such venues as Essence, Black Enterprise, The Source, U.S. News & World Report, Omni, Black Issues Book Review, Bookpage, Quarterly Black Review, The New York Times and Publishers Weekly. He also ventured into Creative Writing such as poetry and fiction, and, in addition, became an editor.

His first published creative works were two books of poetry, Melons in (1974) and Stars in (1975). He currently teaches two courses in journalism at The New School in New York City: "Media And The Black Experience", and "Hard and Soft News: Journalism for A New World".

His poetry, essays, and short stories have appeared in many books. The first was Dark Matter: The Anthology of Science Fiction, Fantasy and Speculative Fiction by Black Writers—named a New York Times notable book, because it was the first anthology of science fiction and fantasy by Black Writers. Fleming's work also appeared in the collection of black erotica Brown Sugar.

== Bibliography ==
- Melons – poetry (1974)
- Stars – poetry (1975)
- Rescuing A Neighborhood: The Bedford-Stuyvesant Volunteer Ambulance Corps – Young adult novel (1992)
- The Success of Caroline Jones, Inc: The Story of an Advertising Agency – Young adult novel (1993)
- The Wisdom of the Elders (1997)
- "The Astral Visitor Delta Blues" - short story in Sheree Thomas (ed.), Dark Matter (2000)
- The African American Writer's Handbook: How to Get in Print and Stay in Print (2000)
- After Hours: A Collection of Erotic Writing by Black Men (2002). Named "Best Erotic Collection of 2002" by Black Issues Book Review
- Havoc After Dark: Tales of Terror (2002)
- Intimacy: Erotic Stories of Love, Lust, and Marriage by Black Men (2004)
- Proverbs for the People (2004)
- Fever in the Blood (2006)
