= The Mammoth Book of Best New Horror =

Short story collection

First edition Cover art by Les Edwards

The Mammoth Book of Best New Horror is an anthology series published annually by Constable & Robinson since 1990. In addition to the short stories, each edition includes a retrospective essay by the editors. The first six anthologies were originally published under the name Best New Horror before the title was changed beginning with the seventh book.

The first five books in the series were edited by Stephen Jones and Ramsey Campbell; beginning with the sixth book in 1995 they have been edited solely by Stephen Jones.

== Volumes ==
- Best New Horror - 1990
- Best New Horror 2 - 1991
- Best New Horror 3 - 1992
- Best New Horror 4 - 1993
- Best New Horror 5 - 1994
- Best New Horror 6 - 1995
- The Mammoth Book of Best New Horror 7 - 1996
- The Mammoth Book of Best New Horror 8 - 1997
- The Mammoth Book of Best New Horror 9 - 1998
- The Mammoth Book of Best New Horror 10 - 1999
- The Mammoth Book of Best New Horror 11 - 2000
- The Mammoth Book of Best New Horror 12 - 2001
- The Mammoth Book of Best New Horror 13 - 2002
- The Mammoth Book of Best New Horror 14 - 2003
- The Mammoth Book of Best New Horror 15 - 2004
- The Mammoth Book of Best New Horror 16 - 2005
- The Mammoth Book of Best New Horror 17 - 2006
- The Mammoth Book of Best New Horror 18 - 2007
- The Mammoth Book of Best New Horror 19 - 2008
- The Mammoth Book of Best New Horror 20 - 2009
- The Mammoth Book of Best New Horror 21 - 2010
- The Mammoth Book of Best New Horror 22 - 2011
- The Mammoth Book of Best New Horror 23 - 2012
- The Mammoth Book of Best New Horror 24 - 2013
- The Mammoth Book of Best New Horror 25 - 2014
- The Mammoth Book of Best New Horror 26 - 2015
- The Mammoth Book of Best New Horror 27 - 2017
- The Mammoth Book of Best New Horror 28 - 2018
- The Mammoth Book of Best New Horror 29 - 2019
- The Mammoth Book of Best New Horror 30 - 2020
- The Mammoth Book of Best New Horror 31 - 2021

== Reception ==
Gideon Kibblewhite reviewed the 1994 volume of The Best New Horror for Arcane magazine, rating it a 9 out of 10 overall. Kibblewhite comments that "Drawing on the great variety of horror writing, from psychological suspense to magical realism, this collection also provides an excellent opportunity to become acquainted with some of the great authors of the field."

Books from the anthology series have been nominated for the World Fantasy Award for Best Anthology. The first book in the series won the 1991 award, and the twelfth volume was nominated for the 2002 award.
