= Indigenous Film Archive =

The Indigenous Film Archive (IFA) is a non-profit organization established to promote and document the indigenous culture, language and practices of Nepal with the help of motion pictures.

The Indigenous Film Archive has organized the annual Nepal International Indigenous Film Festival since 2007.
