= Mothersound =

2023 anthology edited by Wole Talabi

Mothersound: The Sauútiverse Anthology
- Editor: Wole Talabi
- Cover artist: Akintoba Kalejaye and Stephen Embleton
- Language: English
- Series: Sauútiverse
- Publisher: Android Press
- Publication date: 21 Nov 2023
- Pages: 436 (paperback)
- ISBN: 9781958121603
- Followed by: Sauúti Terrors

Mothersound: The Sauútiverse Anthology is a 2023 science fantasy anthology edited by Wole Talabi. The anthology brings together various authors writing stories set in a shared fictional universe.

== Background ==
The Sauúti Collective began as a partnership between Syllble and Brittle Paper.

During a 2024 interview on the podcast I Should Be Writing, Wole Talabi discussed the experience of working with different authors within the shared literary universe that is the Sauútiverse. The Sauútiverse has a "story bible" which contains information about the setting, helping to maintain continuity between stories. Talabi described the process as collaborative rather than individualistic.

== Contents ==
1. "Foreword: I Dream Of Sauúti" by Fabrice Guerrier
2. "Welcome to the Sauútiverse" by Wole Talabi
3. "Our Mother, Creator" by Stephen Embleton and Wole Talabi
4. "What Has No Mouth" by Dare Segun Falowo
5. "The Way of Baa'gh" by Cheryl S. Ntumy
6. "The Grove’s Lament" by Tobias S. Buckell
7. "Xhova" Adelehin Ijasan
8. "A City, a Desert, and All Their Dirges" by Somto Ihezue and Oghenechovwe Donald Ekpeki
9. "Sina, the Child with No Echo" by Eugen Bacon
10. "The Rakwa Wa-Ya'yn" by Stephen Embleton and Wole Talabi
11. "Undulation" by Stephen Embleton
12. "The Hollowed People" by T. L. Huchu
13. "Muting Echoes, Breaking Tradition" by Eye Kay Nwaogu
14. "Kalabashing" by J. Umeh
15. "Lost in the Echoes" by Xan van Rooyen
16. "Hologhiri" by Akintoba Kalejaye

== Reception and awards ==
Publishers Weekly gave the anthology a starred review, stating that it "stands out for both its cross-genre reach and the immense scope of its ambitions." The review praised the diversity of the stories, which range in tone from light-hearted to horror. The review stated that the shared universe feels like the start of "something monumental."

Michaela Teschendorff Harden reviewed the anthology for Aurealis. Harden stated that each story in the anthology was interconnected, creating a "novelistic" style despite the various authors. The review praised the blending of science fiction and fantasy elements, as well as the inclusion of cultural elements from Africa and the African diaspora. Regarding the anthology's thematic content, Harden commented on the stories "The Way of Baa'gh" and "Muting Echoes, Breaking Tradition." Both stories examine the inherent dangers of colonialism and its violent impacts. The review concluded that "Mothersound is an in-depth introduction to the new world of Sauúti. Every story is intricate and moving, constructing the building blocks for future Sauúti projects."

Awards and honors
Work	Year	Award	Category	Result	Ref.
"The Grove's Lament"	2023	BSFA Award	Short Fiction	Longlisted	
Mothersound	2023	BSFA Award	Collection	Shortlisted	
Mothersound	2024	British Fantasy Award	Anthology	Shortlisted	
Mothersound	2024	Locus Award	Anthology	Finalist	
"Sina, the Child with No Echo"	2023	BSFA Award	Short Fiction	Longlisted	
"Undulation"	2023	BSFA Award	Shorter Fiction	Longlisted	
"Undulation"	2024	Nommo Award	Novella	Won	
"The Way of Baa'gh"	2023	BSFA Award	Short Fiction	Longlisted	
"The Way of Baa'gh"	2024	Nommo Award	Short Story	Finalist	
