= Akua Lezli Hope =

American writer

Akua Lezli Hope is an African-American woman artist, poet and writer.

== Early life and education ==
Hope was raised in New York City by a "brilliant seamstress and tailor" mother who taught her to crochet at a young age and a father who enthusiastically encouraged her interest in science fiction. She recalls being constantly surrounded as a child by "adults who spoke to [her], told [her] stories, taught [her] songs," inspiring an early interest in literature. Before she knew how to read and write, she dictated original poetry for her mother to transcribe.

Hope took part in a music program in high school, learning to play violin, cello, and bassoon. She also participated as a singer in youth choirs.

Hope holds a B.A. in psychology from Williams College, an M.B.A. in marketing from Columbia University Graduate School of Business, and an M.S.J. in broadcast journalism from Columbia University Graduate School of Journalism.

== Career ==
Hope's artistic output includes crocheted clothing and accessories, handcrafted earrings, and works produced via "weaving, sculpting, hand paper-making, glass casting, flame working, and wire working." She has published more than a hundred original crochet patterns for the use of other artists.

She is a founding member of the Black Writers Union and the New Renaissance Writers Guild. She was an Area Coordinator for Amnesty International.

Hope's poetry and short fiction, much of which pertains to the genres of science fiction and fantasy, has appeared in numerous journals and anthologies and has been partially reunited in collections of her poetry.

In 2021, Hope edited the anthology NOMBONO: Speculative Poetry by BIPOC Poets for Sundress Publications. The same year, she also edited an issue of online poetry journal Eye to the Telescope.

== Personal life ==
In 2005, Hope was stricken with transverse myelitis, a rare idiopathic autoimmune disease, and became a paraplegic.

== Recognition ==
In both 1987 and in 2003, Hope won an Artists Fellowship from the New York Foundation for the Arts. In 1990, she was awarded a Creative Writing Fellowship from the National Endowment for the Arts and in 1993, she was the recipient of a Ragdale U.S.-Africa Fellowship.

Hope held the post of Poet-in-Residence at Chautauqua Institution in 1997 and of Artist-in-Residence at Women’s Studio Workshop in 2001. Also in 2001, she was the recipient of a Hurston-Wright Writers’ Week Fellowship.

Hope's collection Embouchure, Poems on Jazz and Other Musics won the Writer's Digest 1995 poetry book award. Her poem "METIS EMITS" won the 2015 SFPA Poetry Contest in the Short category, and in 2021, her collection Otherwheres placed first in the Chapbook category of the annual Elgin Awards for best speculative poetry book.

In 2021 Hope won an Individual Artist Grant from The Arts Council of the Southern Finger Lakes, for her Now Voyager project.

In 2022 Hope won an individual artist grant from the NYSCA for her project,"Afrofuturist Pastoral Speculative Poetry."

Hope was named a Grand Master of Fantastic Poetry by the SFPA in 2022.

Dark Matter: A Century of Speculative Fiction from the African Diaspora, which includes Hope's story "The Becoming," was designated a New York Times notable book.

In 2024 Hope won an individual artist grant from the NYSCA for her project,"Disability Poetics." Her poem, My mother, She Ate Me, won the 2024 IGNYTE Award for OUTSTANDING SPECULATIVE POETRY and her poem Giant Robot and His Person won the 2024 27th Annual Critters Readers' Poll Best Poem.

== Published works ==
=== Poetry collections ===
- TELEPATH (Gnashing Teeth Publishing, 2026)
- NOMBONO: An Anthology of Speculative Poetry by BIPOC Creators from Around the World (Sundress Publications, 2021)
- OTHERWHERES:Speculative Poetry
- Them Gone (The Word Works, 2018)
- Embouchure, Poems on Jazz and Other Musics (ArtFarm Press, 1995)
