= Dilman Dila =

Ugandan writer, filmmaker and social activist

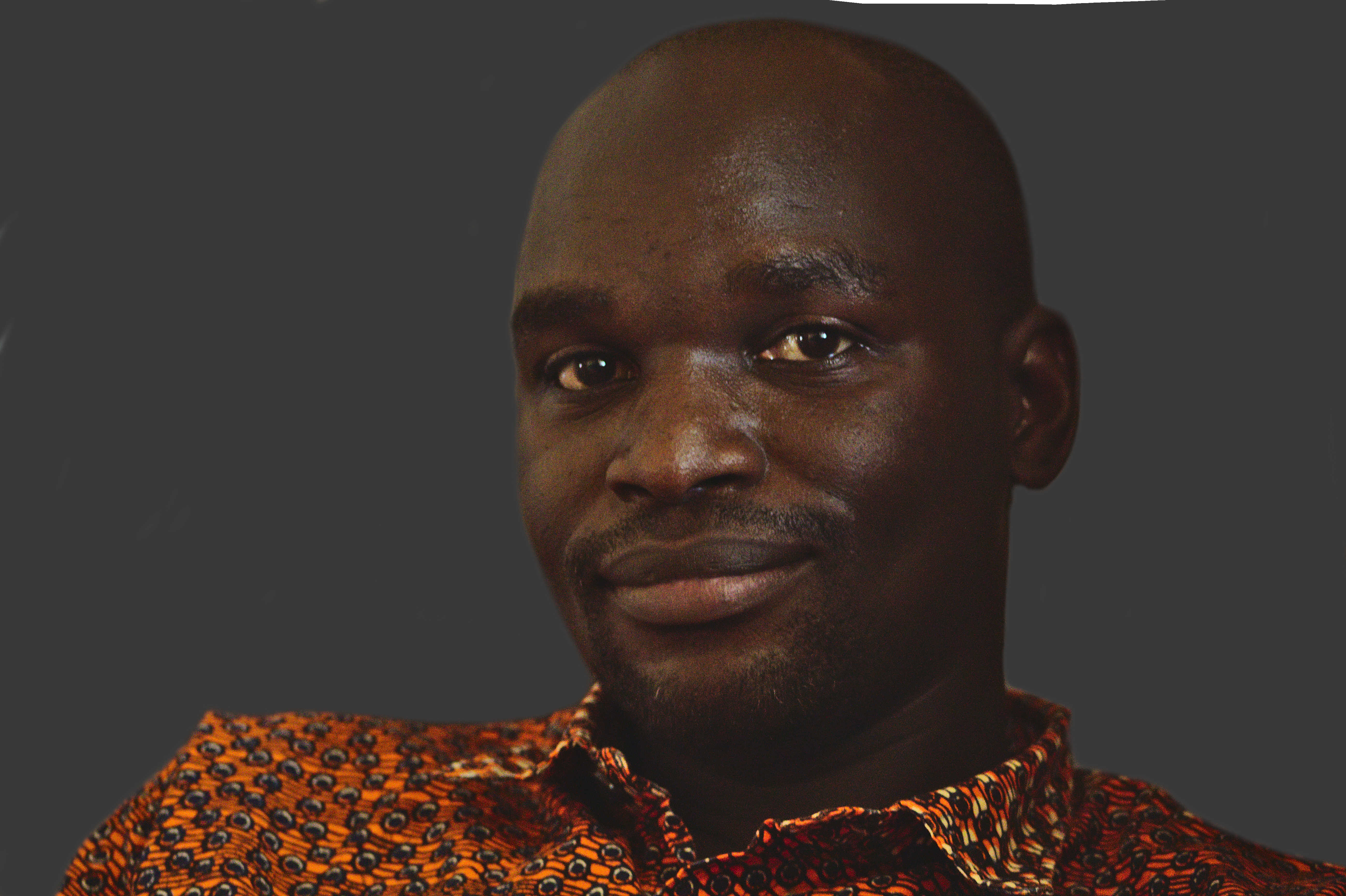
- Dila in 2019
- Born: Dilman Dila
- Education: Makerere University
- Occupations: Film maker, writer
- Writing career
- Genre: Fiction
- Notable works: Cranes Crest at Sunset, The Felistas Fable
- Website: dilmandila.com

Dilman Dila is a Ugandan writer, film maker and a social activist. He is the author of two collection of short stories, A Killing in the Sun and Where Rivers Go to Die, and of two novellas, Cranes Crest at Sunset, and The Terminal Move. He was shortlisted for the 2013 Commonwealth Short Story Prize for "A Killing in the Sun", longlisted for the Short Story Day Africa Prize in 2013, and nominated for the 2008 Million Writers Award for the short story "Homecoming". He was longlisted for the BBC International Radio Playwriting Competition with his first radio play, Toilets Are for Something Fishy. His film The Felistas Fable (2013) won four awards at the Uganda Film Festival 2014, for Best Screenplay, Best Actor, Best Feature Film, and Film of the Year (Best Director). It won two nominations at the Africa Movie Academy Awards for Best First Feature by a Director, and Best Make-up Artist. It was also nominated for the African Magic Viewers Choice Awards for Best Make-up artist, 2013. His first short film, What Happened in Room 13, is one of the most watched African films on YouTube. In 2015, he was longlisted for the Inaugural Jalada Prize for Literature for his story "Onen and his Daughter".

== Early life and education ==
Dilman was born in Tororo, Uganda. He grew up with his family on Bazaar Street, which harboured a multitude of cultures and nationalities. It is exposure at an early childhood to different stories from different tribes that gave him a strong foundation in storytelling. He attained primary education at Rock View Primary School, and secondary education at St. Peter's College, Tororo, before proceeding to Makerere University, where he did a BA in Social Sciences, majoring in Political Science (International Relations) and Economics.

Upon completing his university degree, he worked for human rights organisations, and for non-government developmental agencies for eight years, an experience that not only made him a social activist, but provided him with material for his writing and filmmaking.

== Writing ==
He was introduced into storytelling at an early age by the folktales that he used to hear from his parents, and from fellow children, in the town he grew up in, Tororo. He started writing when he was 15 years old. His first works appeared in print in The Sunday Vision in 2001, and have since featured in several e-zines and book anthologies. These include The African Roar anthology in 2013, Storymoja, and Gowanus Books.

He writes speculative fiction, especially in the genres of horror, science fiction, and fantasy. The story that won a shortlist with the Commonwealth Short Story Prize, "A Killing in the Sun", is a ghost tale. He published his first science fiction story, Lights on Water, in The Short Anthology. In 2014, he launched his first collection of speculative short stories, during the Storymoja Festival, in Nairobi, Kenya.

In 2013, he was shortlisted for the prestigious Commonwealth Short Story Prize and longlisted for the Short Story Day Africa Prize.

In 2013, he facilitated a short-story surgery workshop, together with Alexander Ikawah, in collaboration with Commonwealth Writers, at the Storymoja Hay Festival. and in 2014 he was a mentor in the Writivism project. He returned to the Storymoja Festival, where he was a festival guest in 2014, conducting a masterclass with Prajwal Parajuly.

In 2013, San Diego State University included his short story "Homecoming", in its syllabus for an English course.

== Film making ==
Dilman Dila is a self-taught film maker. He however greatly benefited from the Maisha Film Lab, where he learned the craft from experienced mentors from Indian Cinema, and from Hollywood. He attended five different labs with Maisha, spanning a period from 2006 until 2008, in the areas of screenwriting and directing, for both fiction and documentary. The other trainings he attained include the Durban Talent Campus 2008, MNet Screenwriters Workshop in 2009, European Social Documentary International in 2012, and Berlinale Talents in 2014.

Many regard his first short film, What Happened in Room 13 (2007), featuring the famous comedians Ugandan Richard Tuwangye, Anne Kansiime, Veronica Namanda, Hanningtong Bujingo, and Gerald Rutaro, as a masterpiece from Uganda's young industry. The Young Ones Who Won't Stay Behind (2008) was his first collaboration with the world-famous film maker Mira Nair. Dila spent two years in Nepal, after receiving funding from Voluntary Service Overseas (VSO), to work with local organisations on film making for social change. While there, he made several documentaries. Untouchable Love (2011) was selected for IDFA's Docs for Sale, 2011, where it picked a UK-based distributor. With The Sound of One Leg Dancing (2011), he won The Jury Award at the Nepal International Indigenous Film Festival in 2012. The Dancing Poet (2012) made its debut at the We Speak, Here online festival in 2014. The two years in Nepal helped him to hone his craft, before he felt that the next stories he wanted to package and send out into the world were explicitly African in makeup, even if they came from a shared perspective that informed his earlier work.

His first narrative feature, The Felistas Fable (2013) won two nominations at the Africa Movie Academy Awards for Best First Feature by a Director, and for Best Make-up Artist It was also nominated for the African Magic Viewers Choice Awards 2014 for Best Make-up Artist.

== Awards and recognition ==
=== Writing ===
- Nominated for the 2008 Million Writers Awards: Notable online fiction.
- Longlisted for the Short Story Day Africa prize, 2013
- Shortlisted Commonwealth Short Story Prize 2013
- Longlisted for BBC International Radio Playwriting Competition 2014
- Nominated for the 2024 Philip K. Dick Award

=== Film ===
- Winner of The Jury Award (Bronze drum) at the Nepal International Indigenous Film Festival, with The Sound of One Leg Dancing, 2012
- Winner of Film of the Year (Best Director) at the Uganda Film Festival 2014 for The Felistas Fable
- Winner of Best Feature Film at the Uganda Film Festival 2014 for The Felistas Fable
- Winner of Best Screenplay at the Uganda Film Festival 2014 for The Felistas Fable
- Nominated for Best First Feature by a Director at the Africa Movie Academy Awards 2014, for the film The Felistas Fable
- His film, The Felistas Fable, was nominated for Best Make-up Artist at the Africa Movie Academy Awards 2014 and at the African Magic Views Choice Awards, 2014

== Published works ==
=== Novellas, Chapbook ===
- —— (2013). Cranes Crest at Sunset. Storymoja Publishers. ISBN 9789966001818.
- —— (2013). The Terminal Move. Fox & Raven Publishing. ISBN 9780987008985.
- —— (2020). A Fledgling Abiba.
- —— (2021). The Future God of Love.

=== Short story collections ===
- —— (2014). A Killing in the Sun. Black Letter Media. ISBN 9780987019875.
- —— (2023). Where Rivers Go to Die. Rosarium. ISBN 9780578368030.

=== Short stories ===
- "The First War", in The Sunday Vision, January 2001
- "The Soldier's Wife", in The Sunday Vision, February 2001
- "The Campaign Agent", in The Sunday Vision, May 2001
- "Death in the Moonlight", in The Sunday Vision, May 2001
- "Stu's Honeymoon", in The Swamp, 2004
- "Bloodline of Blades", in ShadowSword, October 2005
- "Lights on Water", in The Short Story anthology, 2014
- "Fragments of Canvas", in Dark Fire, January 2005
- "Homecoming", Gowanus Books, 2007, and nominated for the 2008 Million Writers Award: Notable Online Fiction of 2007
- "In Search of a Smoke", Gowanus Books, 2007
- "The Young Matchmaker". The Kathmandu Post. 4 July 2010. Archived from the original on 19 March 2016 – via HighBeam Research.
- "Stones Bounce on Water", Storymoja.com, April 2011
- "Billy is Three Weeks Dead", in Ann Dawson, ed. (2006). Dead Men (and Women) Walking. Bards and Sages. ISBN 9781847289063.
- "The Broken Pot", in Jennings, Karen, ed. (2013). Feast, Famine & Potluck. Short Story Day Africa. ISBN 9780620588867.
- "The Puppets of Maramudhu", in Emmanuel Sigauke, ed. (2013). African Roar 2013. StoryTime. ISBN 9780987008985.
- "Lights on Water", in The Short Story, 2014
- "Red Bati" in Dominion: An Anthology of Speculative Fiction From Africa and the African Diaspora, 2020
- "Yad Madit" in Africanfuturism: An Anthology, (2020, Brittle Paper)

== Filmography ==
=== Producer/Director/Writer ===
- Under Sarah's Bed (2007, Uganda), 1 minute, film
- Home is a Fine Place to Die (2007, Uganda), 3 minutes, film
- Listening to Her Voice (2008, Uganda), 12 minutes, film
- Street Strings (2008, Uganda), 15 minutes, documentary
- Untouchable Love (2011, Nepal), 90 minutes, documentary
- The Sound of One Leg Dancing (2011, Nepal), 30 minutes, documentary
- The Dancing Poet (2012, Nepal/Uganda), 60 minutes, documentary
- The Felistas Fable (2013, Uganda), 90 minutes, fiction
- Saving Mugisha (2013, Uganda), 18 minutes, fiction

=== Writer/Director ===
- How Will I Get a Drink? (2007, Uganda), 5 minutes, documentary
- The Young Ones Who Won't Stay Behind (2008, Uganda), 15 minutes, documentary
- What Happened in Room 13 (2007, Uganda), 18 minutes, film

=== Writer ===
- After the Silence (2006, Uganda), 34 minutes, film
