= Craig Laurance Gidney =

American writer

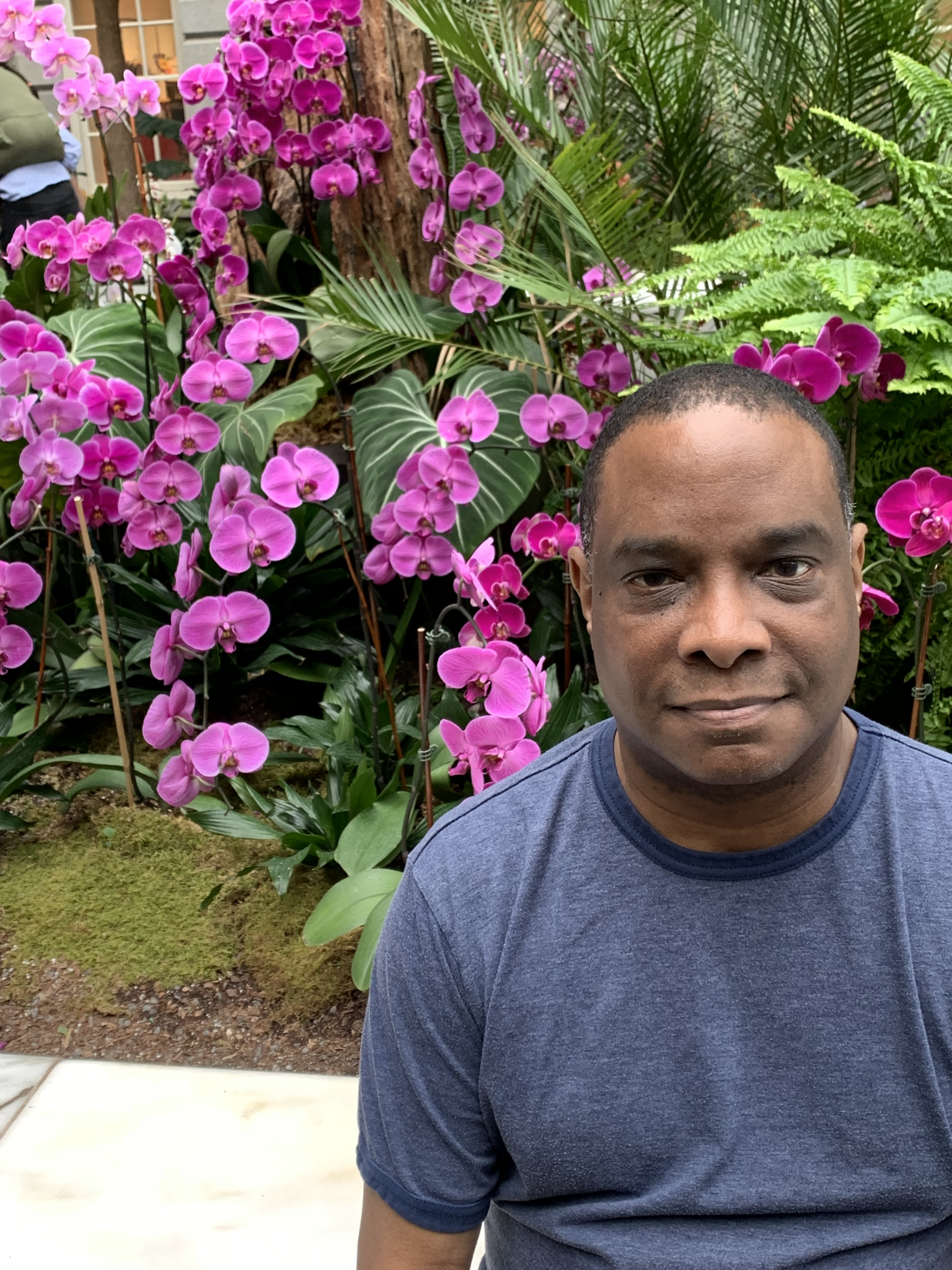
- Laurance at the Smithsonian
- Occupation: Writer
- Writing career
- Language: English
- Genres: Science fiction, fantasy, horror
- Notable awards: Independent Publisher Book Awards
- Website: craiglaurancegidney.com

Craig L. Gidney is an American speculative fiction novelist and short story writer. He is openly gay.

His works are known for mixing genres, containing elements of horror, fantasy, folklore, and magical realism. The collection Sea, Swallow Me features short stories in diverse settings and sub-genres, including queer historical fiction as well as speculative fiction. Gidney counts Octavia Butler and Toni Morrison among his influences. His work often incorporates research on the queer history of the Harlem Renaissance.

== Works ==
- Sea, Swallow Me & Other Stories (Lethe Press, 2008)
- Skin Deep Magic (Rebel Satori Press, 2014)
- Bereft (Tiny Satchel Press, 2013)
- The Nectar of Nightmares (Strange Alphabets Press, 2018)
- A Spectral Hue (Word Horde, 2019)

== Awards and nominations ==
- Susan C. Petrey Scholarship, Clarion West Writers Workshop (1996)
- Gaylactic Spectrum Finalist for “A Bird of Ice”, 2008
- Lambda Literary Awards Finalist for Sea, Swallow Me & Other Stories, 2008
- Lambda Literary Awards Finalist for Skin Deep Magic, 2014
- Bronze Moonbeam Medal for Bereft, 2014
- Silver Independent Publisher Book Awards for Bereft, 2014
- Won World Fantasy Award for Best Anthology for Storyteller: A Tanith Lee Tribute Anthology edited by Julie C. Day with Craig Laurance Gidney & Carina Bissett, 2026.
