= Margrét Helgadóttir =

Norwegian-Icelandic author and editor (born 1971)

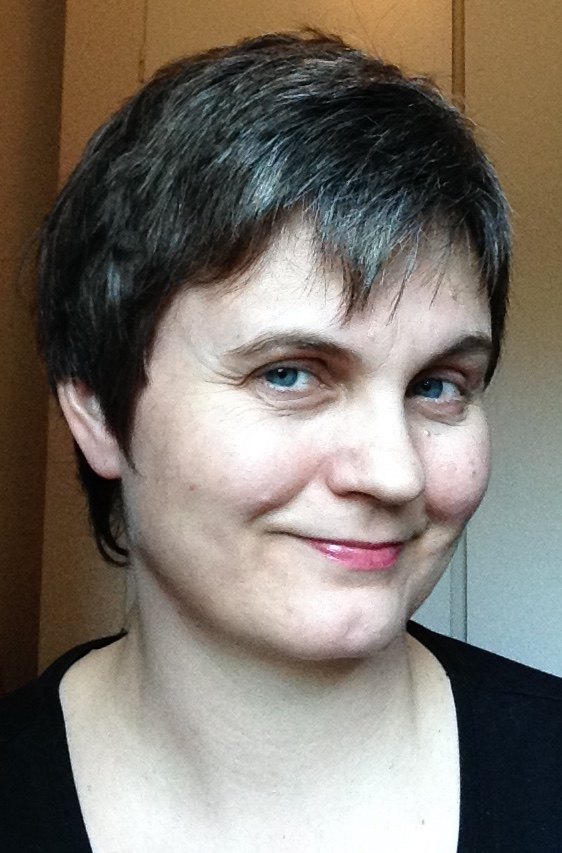
- Margret Helgadottir
- Born: Ingibjörg Margrét Helgadóttir; November 10, 1971 (age 54); Yirgalem, Ethiopia
- Education: Cand.polit.
- Occupations: Short-story writer, author, editor, anthologist
- Writing career
- Genres: Science fiction Speculative fiction Horror fiction
- Website: margrethelgadottir.wordpress.com

Margrét Helgadóttir is Norwegian-Icelandic, a four times British Fantasy Award-nominated author and anthology editor, and winner of the Starburst's Brave New Words Award.

== Biography ==
Helgadóttir was born in Ethiopia to Norwegian and Icelandic parents. She has written about her background as Missionary kid and crosscultural child, and how it has influenced her writing, and said: “... the scars and blessings it has given me to be a child who moved lots between cultures whilst trying to develop my own identity. ... Many of my characters struggle with grief and a feeling of being lost, like in The Stars Seem So Far Away.”

She holds a Cand.polit. degree in Pedagogy from the University of Oslo. She has worked as teacher, and in several Norwegian ministries and directorates in Oslo, and in the Nordic Council of Ministers in Copenhagen, Denmark.

Helgadóttir is a charter member of the African Speculative Fiction Society.

She lives in Oslo, and has lived in Ethiopia, Senegal, Denmark and Norway.

== Work ==
Helgadóttir started writing fiction in English (her native language is Norwegian) in 2012, when she was one of the winners of a writing competition held by UK-based Fox Spirit Books. Her stories have since then appeared in several anthologies and magazines, such as Luna Station Quarterly, Gone Lawn Journal, The Girl at the End of the World, and Sunspot Jungle - The Ever Expanding Universe of Fantasy and Science Fiction. Her prose is called lyrical and haunting.

Helgadóttir's debut book, The Stars Seem So Far Away, from 2015, was nominated for British Fantasy Awards in 2016, and is an apocalyptic road tale set in a far-future Arctic world, told through linked tales of five survivors. The book can be seen as a hybrid of a novel and a collection. Mark Bould wrote: "This is why the slightly unusual structure works so well. The characters – and the novel – move from profound disconnection to reconnection." Interzone (magazine) said: "Whether these are stories, chapters, fragments or something else, this book is still stunningly original”, and: “imagine J.G. Ballard rewrote The Odyssey”, while E.P. Beaumont wrote: “The stripped-down language and huge landscapes link this short novel to the world of epic poetry and saga."

Helgadóttir is also an anthology editor, her work including the seven volumes in the anthology series The Fox Spirit Books of Monsters, where she invited authors and artists to write stories based on their own folklore and culture. The idea of the series is to feature creatures and monsters from around the world that have not received much spotlight in the western culture. The Future Fire says: "... this series is a needed intervention into Anglo-American-centric monster stories", while Bookshy writes: “The thing is growing up in Nigeria, European and American monsters never really terrified me because they were far away. ... So African Monsters terrified me in a way that a horror story hasn't in a long while because I could really relate to the monsters”.

The series contain stories by authors such as Cory Doctorow, Darcie Little Badger, Liliana Colanzi, Lewis Shiner, Nnedi Okorafor, Tade Thompson, Ken Liu, Xia Jia, Aliette de Bodard, Usman T. Malik, Tina Makereti, and Maria Galina. Three of the volumes have been nominated for British Fantasy Awards, and Helgadóttir was awarded Starburst (magazine)'s inaugural Brave New Words Award for her editor work on Pacific Monsters. The award is made to an “individual who produces break-out literature that is New and Bold.”

== Selected works ==
Short stories:

- “A Lion Roars in Longyearbyen” in Slate, Dec 2022. Republished in anthology Nordic Visions. The Best of Nordic Speculative Fiction, eds. Margrét Helgadóttir. Solaris, Oct 2023. ISBN 1837860297
- “A Sailor Girl Goes Ashore” in anthology The Girl at the End of the World. Volume 1, eds. Adele Wearing, Fox Spirit Books, July 2014. ISBN 1909348554 Republished in anthology Everyone: Worlds Without Walls, eds. Tony C. Smith. District of Wonders, Dec 2017. ISBN 1527214672
- “Arnhild” in anthology In An Unknown Country, Fox Pockets volume 7, Fox Spirit Books, Feb 2016. ISBN 1909348864
- “Cold Waters” in Negative Suck, Winter issue, Dec 2012.
- “Daybreak” in Luna Station Quarterly, Issue 020, Dec 2014.
- “Death Wish” in Gone Lawn journal, Issue 21, May 2016. Republished in anthology The Black Room Manuscripts Volume Four, eds. J.R. Park and Tracy Fahey. Sinister Horror Company, Oct 2018. ISBN 1912578034
- “Grandma’s Tricks” in In-flight Literary Magazine, Issue four, July 2015.
- “Lost Bonds” in anthology Guardians, Fox Pockets volume 3, Fox Spirit Books, Feb 2014. ISBN 1909348376 Republished in anthology Sunspot Jungle - The Ever Expanding Universe of Fantasy and Science Fiction, volume two, eds. Bill Campbell. Rosarium Publishing, June 2019. ISBN 1732638802
- “Monster” in Tuck Magazine, February issue, 2013.
- “Nightmare” in anthology Things in the Dark, Fox Pockets volume 6, Fox Spirit Books, Dec 2015. ISBN 1909348856
- “Nora” in anthology Piracy, Fox Pockets volume 1, Fox Spirit Books, June 2013. ISBN 1909348244
- “Ocean Sky” in anthology Under the Waves, Fox Pockets volume 5, Fox Spirit Books, May 2015. ISBN 1909348791
- “Shadow” in anthology Impossible Spaces, eds. Hannah Kate, Hic Dragones, July 2013. ISBN 0957029284
- “The Home of the Foxes” in anthology Tales of the Fox & Fae, eds. Adele Wearing, Fox Spirit Books, Jan 2014. ISBN 1909348341
- “The Lion” in anthology Shapeshifters, Fox Pockets volume 2, Fox Spirit Books, Nov 2013. ISBN 1909348228
- “The Lottery Winner” in Luna Station Quarterly, Issue 025, Mar 2016.
- “The Pact” in The Linnet’s Wings, Autumn issue, Oct 2013.
- “The Rescue” in Luna Station Quarterly, Issue 013, Mar 2013. Republished in anthology The Best of Luna Station Quarterly. The First Five Years, Luna Station Press, July 2015. ISBN 1938697596 Republished in anthology European Science Fiction #1 – Knowing the Neighbours, eds. Francesco Verso. Future Fiction, July 2021. ISBN 9788832077254
- “Worker of the Year” in Gone Lawn journal, Summer issue #15, July 2014.

Books:

- The Stars Seem So Far Away by Margret Helgadottir, Fox Spirit Books, Feb 2015. ISBN 1909348767

Non fiction:

- “Look to Africa!” Essay in Far Horizons Magazine. Issue 30, April 2018.
- “Monsters of the World.” In the anthology Making Monsters: A Speculative and Classical Anthology. Eds. Emma Bridges and Djibril al-Ayad. Futurefire.net Publishing and The Institute of Classical Studies, University of London (2018). ISBN 0995726507

== Anthologies edited ==
- Nordic Visions. The Best of Nordic Speculative Fiction (2023), Solaris. ISBN 1837860297
- Winter Tales (2016), Fox Spirit Books. ISBN 1909348880
- The Fox Spirit Books of Monsters, Fox Spirit Books, seven volumes:
1. European Monsters (co-edited with Jo Thomas) (2014) ISBN 1909348724
2. African Monsters (co-edited with Jo Thomas) (2015) ISBN 1909348848
3. Asian Monsters (2016) ISBN 1909348996
4. Pacific Monsters (2017) ISBN 1910462128
5. American Monsters Part 1 (2018) ISBN 1910462217
6. American Monsters Part 2 (2019) ISBN 1910462292
7. Eurasian Monsters (2020) ISBN 1910462314

== Awards ==
Shortlists (finalist):

- British Fantasy Awards 2016: Best Collection (The Stars Seem So Far Away)
- British Fantasy Awards 2016: Best Anthology (African Monsters)
- British Fantasy Awards 2017: Best Anthology (Asian Monsters)
- British Fantasy Awards 2018: Best Anthology (Pacific Monsters)

Awards:

- Sheffield Fantasy and Science Fiction Social Club (SFSF) Awards 2016: Best anthology (African Monsters)
- Sheffield Fantasy and Science Fiction Social Club (SFSF) Awards 2017: Best anthology (Pacific Monsters)
- Starburst Fantasy Awards 2018: Brave New Words Award (editor work on Pacific Monsters)

Stories in anthologies Helgadóttir has edited have also been shortlisted to several awards, including the Caine Prize for African Writing (2017: Chikodili Emelumadu for “Bush Baby” in African Monsters), Aurealis Award (2017: Michael Grey for "Grind" in Pacific Monsters), Australian Shadows Award (2017: Rue Karney for "The Hand Walker" in Pacific Monsters), and Sir Julius Vogel Awards (2018: AJ Fitwater for "From the Womb of the Land, Our Bones Entwined" in Pacific Monsters).
