= Ife-Iyoku, the Tale of Imadeyunuagbon =

2019 novella by Oghenechovwe Donald Ekpeki

- Author: Oghenechovwe Donald Ekpeki
- Language: English
- Series: Dominion: An Anthology of Speculative Fiction from Africa and the African Diaspora
- Release number: 5
- Genre: Fantasy/Science fiction
- Publisher: Aurelia Leo
- Publication date: 17 August 2020
- Publication place: Nigeria
- Media type: Print (Paperback), E-book
- Awards: Otherwise Award; Nommo Award

Ife-Iyoku, the Tale of Imadeyunuagbon is a fantasy novella by Nigerian speculative fiction writer Oghenechovwe Donald Ekpeki. It was first published Selene Quarterly in August 2019, and republished in Dominion: An Anthology of Speculative Fiction From Africa and the African Diaspora anthology which was published by Aurelia Leo in 2020. The novella received critical reviews.

== Plot summary ==
The novella is set in a post-apocalyptic world particularly after one of the world wars. After the war, the remains of Africa settled in Ife-Iyoku, a place in the Oyo Empire.

== Reception ==
It was nominated for the Nebula Award for Best Novella. it was also shortlisted for Theodore Sturgeon Award It was also nominated for the BSFA Award. It won the 2020 Otherwise Award and the 2021 Nommo Award for Best Novella.
