= Nepal International Indigenous Film Festival =

The Nepal International Indigenous Film Festival (NIIFF) is an annual film festival in Kathmandu organised by the Indigenous Film Archive that has been held every year since 2007, one of a number of indigenous film festivals to have been created since the turn of the 21st century. The criteria for films shown at the festival are that they must be by indigenous film-makers, or centre upon "indigenous issues, knowledge, wisdom, good practices, and culture". The goal of this, according to the festival organizers, is to "counteract 'the exclusion, injustice, and discrimination faced by Indigenous Peoples'".

== History ==
2007
Screenings included Kripa, a Gurung language film (subtitled in Nepali) directed by Maotse Gurung.
2008
There were 21 indigenous films and 27 international ones shown.
2009
The international films included Bolivian documentary Building Dignity.
