= Kalamu ya Salaam =

American poet and activist (born 1947)

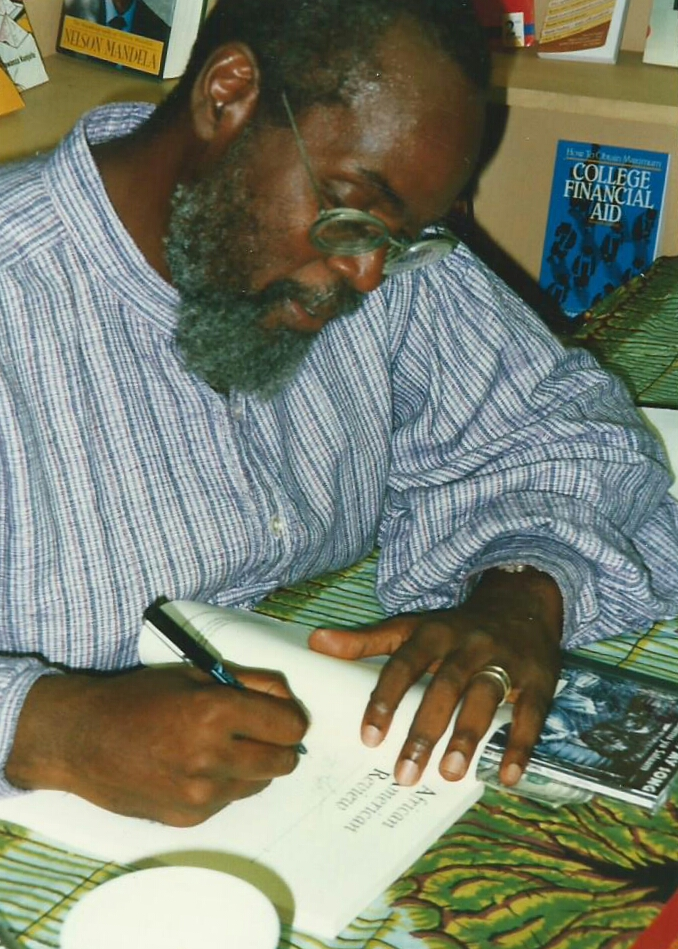
- Born: Vallery Ferdinand III; March 24, 1947 (age 79); New Orleans, Louisiana, United States
- Education: Carleton College; Delgado Junior College
- Occupations: Poet; author; filmmaker; teacher
- Website: www.kalamu.com

Kalamu ya Salaam (born March 24, 1947) is an American poet, author, filmmaker, and teacher from the 9th Ward of New Orleans. A well-known activist and social critic, Salaam has spoken out on a number of racial and human rights issues. For years, he did radio shows on WWOZ. Salaam is the co-founder of the NOMMO Literary Society, a weekly workshop for Black writers.

== Background ==
Born Vallery Ferdinand III in New Orleans, Louisiana, he graduated from high school in 1964, joined the U.S. Army and served in Korea. He attended Carleton College (1964–69) and Delgado Junior College, where he earned an Associate Arts degree in business administration. He was the editor of The Black Collegian magazine for 13 years (1970–83), and has written for many publications including Negro Digest/Black World, First World, The Black Scholar, Black Books Bulletin, Callaloo, Catalyst, The Journal of Black Poetry, Nimrod, Coda, Encore, The New Orleans Tribune, Wavelength, The New Orleans Music Magazine, The Louisiana Weekly newspaper. He is co-founder/editor of Runagate Press.

He is the moderator of Neo-Griot, a Black literature information blog.

== Selected bibliography ==
- The Blues Merchant: Songs for Blkfolk. New Orleans: BLKARTSOUTH, 1969.
- Hofu ni kwenu: My Fears for You. New Orleans: Ahidiana, 1973.
- Pamoja tutashinda: Together We Will Win. New Orleans: Ahidiana, 1973.
- Ibura. New Orleans: Ahidiana, 1976.
- Tearing the Roof off the Sucker: The Fall of South Africa. New Orleans: Ahidiana, 1977.
- South African Showdown: Divestment Now. New Orleans: Ahidiana, 1978.
- Revolutionary Love: Poems and Essays. New Orleans: Ahidiana-Habari, 1978.
- Herufi: An Alphabet Reader. New Orleans: Ahidiana, 1979.
- Iron Flowers: A Poetic Report on a Visit to Haiti. New Orleans: Ahidiana, 1979.
- Our Women Keep Our Skies from Falling: Six Essays in Support of the Struggle to Smash Sexism and Develop Women. New Orleans: Nkombo, 1980.
- Our Music is No Accident. New Orleans: New Orleans Cultural Foundation, 1988. [Images by Keith Calhoun and Chandra McCormick]
- What is Life? Reclaiming the Black Blues Self. Chicago: Third World Press, 1994.
- Tarzan Can - Not Return to Africa But I Can. 1996.
- He's The Prettiest: A Tribute to Big Chief Allison "Tootie" Montana's 50 Years of Mardi Gras Indian Suiting. New Orleans: New Orleans Museum of Art, 1997.
- 360° A Revolution Of Black Poets. Alexandria, Va.: Black Words; New Orleans: Runagate Press, 1998.
- Magic of Juju: An Appreciation of the Black Arts Movement. Chicago: Third World Press, 1998.
- New Orleans Griot: The Tom Dent Reader. New Orleans: UNO Press, 2018.
- Be About Beauty. New Orleans: UNO Press, 2018.
