= Zelda Knight =

American writer and editor

Olivia E. Raymond who writes under the pen name Zelda Knight or Author Z. Knight is an American writer and editor.

== Education ==
Knight holds an MA in Public History from the University of Louisville and is currently post-doctorate student in Pan-African Studies from the same school.

== Career ==
She is known as the co-editor of Dominion: An Anthology of Speculative Fiction From Africa and the African Diaspora and Africa Risen. She is the publisher of Aurelia Leo, a speculative fiction publisher based in Louisville.

== Bibliography ==
- Dominion: An Anthology of Speculative Fiction From Africa and the African Diaspora
- African Risen

== Awards and nominations ==
She won the British Fantasy Award for "Best Anthology" in 2021 for Dominion. She was a nominee for "Best Anthology" category at the 2021 Locus Awards for Dominion. and the 2020 This Is Horror awards. In 2023, Africa Risen was nominated for the 54th NAACP Image Awards for Outstanding Literary Work.
