= Nisi Shawl =

African-American writer, editor, and journalist (born 1955)

- Born: 1955 (age 70–71); Kalamazoo, Michigan, U.S.
- Education: Residential College, University of Michigan College of Literature, Science, and the Arts
- Writing career
- Genre: Speculative fiction
- Notable awards: Otherwise Award (2008)

Nisi Shawl (born 1955) is an African American writer, editor, and journalist. They are best known as an author of science fiction and fantasy short stories who writes and teaches about how fantastic fiction might reflect real-world diversity of gender, sexual orientation, race, physical ability, age, and other sociocultural factors.

== Early life and education ==
Shawl was born in Kalamazoo, Michigan. They started attending the Residential College of the University of Michigan's College of Literature, Science, and the Arts in 1971 at the age of 16, but did not graduate.

They were, however, a 1992 graduate of the Clarion West Writers Workshop and are a member of the Science Fiction and Fantasy Writers of America. They are a board member of Clarion West and one of the founders of the Carl Brandon Society.

== Short stories ==
Shawl's short stories have appeared in Asimov's Science Fiction, the Infinite Matrix, Strange Horizons, Semiotext(e) and numerous other magazines and anthologies. Brian Charles Clark of the fiction review site Curled Up With a Good Book, praised their debut collection, Filter House (2008) – which gathered 11 previously published and three original short fiction pieces – saying that: "Shawl’s keen sense of justice and their adamant anti-colonialism always ride just beneath the surface of their stories. Never didactic, Shawl possesses the gift of a true storyteller: the ability to let the warp and weft of plot and character do their moral work for them."

== Writing the Other ==
Shawl is the co-author (with Cynthia Ward) of Writing the Other: Bridging Cultural Differences for Successful Fiction, a creative writing handbook derived from the authors' workshop of the same name, in which participants explore techniques to help them write credible characters outside their own cultural experience. Reviewer Genevieve Williams of speculative fiction magazine Strange Horizons summed up about this guidebook: "The practices advocated and concepts presented in Writing the Other may seem PC to some, but following them will help to ensure that an author gives more than lip service to diversity and is thoughtful about the creation and development of societies, cultures, and characters (which we all should be anyway). Much of what Shawl and Ward advocate is, quite simply, good practice: the avoidance of cliches, flat characters, unintended effects, and other hallmarks of lazy writing."

== Everfair ==
Shawl's first novel, Neo-Victorian, Belgian Congo–set, steampunk story Everfair, was released in September 2016 by Tor Books, with a cover illustration by Hong Kong artist Victo Ngai.

Everfair is an alternate history of the African Congo, Europe, and the United States, during the late nineteenth/early twentieth century, where Shawl's science fictional turning point is that "the native populations (of the Congo) had learned about steam technology a bit earlier." Their novel imagines that British Fabian Socialists team up with African American Christian missionaries to purchase land in the Congo Basin from Leopold II of Belgium, thus creating a speculative new nation in their version of history, where citizens could experiment with the freedoms they had lacked in their original homelands, as well as benefit from a key technology of the industrial revolution, namely steam engines.

== Contributions to women's, multicultural, and global speculative fiction ==
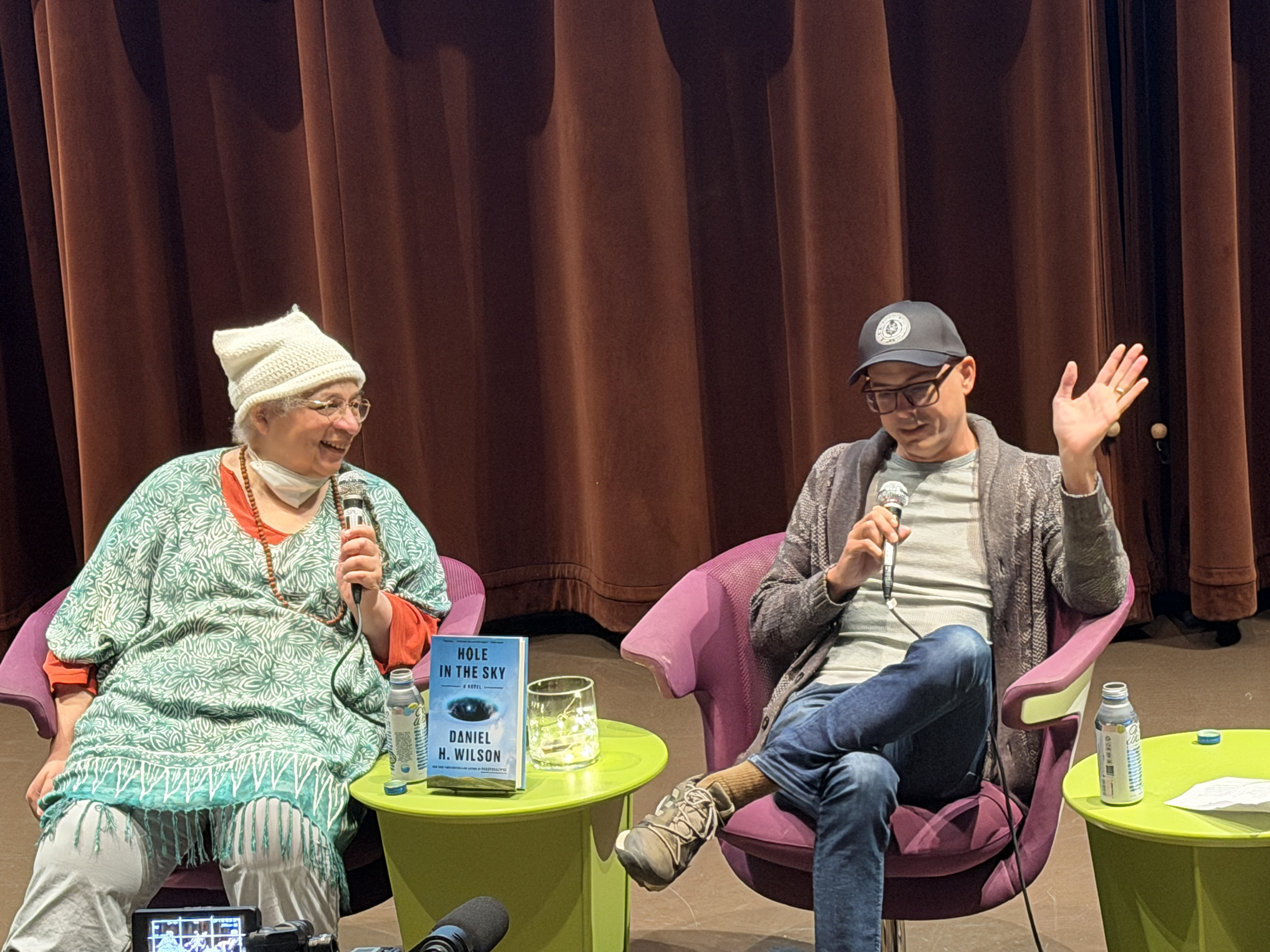
Daniel H. Wilson in conversation with Nisi Shawl at the Seattle Library on Oct. 16, 2025.

Shawl at World Fantasy Convention 2026

In 2009, Shawl donated their archive to the department of Rare Books and Special Collections at Northern Illinois University.

In 2011, their longtime work in the women's speculative fiction was recognized, when Shawl was selected as Guest of Honor at Wiscon 35. In 2015, recognized as one of the "go to" teachers and mentors within the speculative fiction community on pedagogical issues of diversity, they served as guest speaker both in the "Black to the Future: An Imagination Incubator" ("Ferguson is the Future") symposium of multicultural speculative fiction artists, academics, and creative writers, at Princeton University (held on September 14, 2015) and in the "Creating Futures Rooted in Wonder" symposium of fairy tale, science fiction, and indigenous storytellers and scholars, at the University of Hawai'i (held from September 16–19, 2015), where they performed in author readings with Pacific Islander, Native Hawaiian, and other indigenous writers, as well as led creative writing workshops.

Shawl's novel Everfair joins with the growing movement of international speculative fiction by writers of color, including editorial efforts by Jaymee Goh of Malaysia and Joyce Chng of Singapore (author-anthologists behind the 2015 collection of Southeast Asian steampunk published in English, The Sea is Ours: Tales of Steampunk Southeast Asia), to repurpose the science fiction trope of alternate history in critical ways that foreground issues of colonialism, globalization, and culture.

== Afrofuturist and feminist science fiction anthologies ==
Shawl has edited several anthologies of speculative fiction, especially collections of Afrofuturist, feminist, LGBT, and African American speculative fiction short stories, including recent homages to pioneering black/queer science fiction novelists: Samuel R. Delany, in the collection Stories for Chip: A Tribute to Samuel R. Delany (2015), co-edited with Bill Campbell; and Octavia E. Butler, in the collection Strange Matings: Science Fiction, Feminism, African American Voices, and Octavia E. Butler (2015), co-edited by Rebecca J. Holden. Shawl's anthology work has been part of their longtime participation within both the feminist and the African American science fiction writing communities, evidenced in their editing of WisCon Chronicles Vol. 5: Writing and Racial Identity (2011, generated from WisCon, America's most venerable feminist science fiction convention); as well as in their stories' publication within women science fiction writers' literary experiments, such as Talking Back: Epistolary Fantasies (2006, by feminist science fiction publisher Aqueduct Press) and within African American speculative fiction collections, notably the groundbreaking Dark Matter: A Century of Speculative Fiction from the African Diaspora (2000). Dark Matter spawned two follow-up entries, including 2022's Africa Risen: A New Era of Speculative Fiction.

== Personal life and influences ==
They live in Seattle, Washington, where they review books for The Seattle Times as a freelance contributor.

Shawl is bisexual and uses they/them pronouns. They stated in 2018 that they increasingly identify as genderfluid.

Among those who have influenced their work, they have named writers Colette, Monique Wittig, and Raymond Chandler; as well as speculative fiction authors Gwyneth Jones, Suzy McKee Charnas, Joanna Russ, Samuel R. Delany, Howard Waldrop, and Eileen Gunn.

== Awards ==
Their stories have been shortlisted for the Theodore Sturgeon Award, the Gaylactic Spectrum Award, and the Carl Brandon Society Parallax Award. Writing the Other received special mention for the James Tiptree Jr. Award.

In 2008, they won the James Tiptree Jr. Award for Filter House, which was also shortlisted for a World Fantasy Award. In 2009, their novella Good Boy was additionally nominated for a World Fantasy Award. Shawl's 2016 novel, Everfair, was nominated for a Nebula Award. They were awarded a 2018 Kate Wilhelm Solstice Award by the SFWA.

Shawl was a finalist for the Ember Award, given by the Ignyte Awards, in both 2020 and 2025.

Their most recent novel, Making Amends, was nominated for the 2025 Endeavour Award.

== Select bibliography ==
=== Anthologies ===
- —, ed. (March 18, 2019). New Suns: Original Speculative Fiction by People of Color. Solaris Books. ISBN 9781781086384.

=== Short fiction collections ===
- Filter House, 2008, Aqueduct Press
- Our Fruiting Bodies, 2022, Aqueduct Press

=== Short fiction ===
- "I Was a Teenage Genetic Engineer," Semiotext(e) SF, New York, NY: Columbia University, April 1989,
- "The Rainses'," Asimov's Science Fiction Magazine, April 1995 (appeared in FILTER HOUSE)
- "The Pragmatical Princess," Asimov's Science Fiction Magazine, January 1999 (appeared in FILTER HOUSE)
- "At the Huts of Ajala," Dark Matter: A Century of Speculative Fiction from the African Diaspora, New York, : Warner Books, July 2000 (appeared in FILTER HOUSE)
- "Shiomah's Land," Asimov's Science Fiction Magazine, March 2001 (appeared in FILTER HOUSE)
- "Vapors," Wet: More Aqua Erotica, Mary Anne Mohanraj (editor), Three Rivers Press, NY, NY.
- "The Beads of Ku," Rosebud Magazine, Issue 23, April 2002 (appeared in FILTER HOUSE)
- "Momi Watsu," Strange Horizons (website) August 2003 (appeared in FILTER HOUSE)
- "Deep End," So Long Been Dreaming: Postcolonial Science Fiction and Fantasy, edited by Nalo Hopkinson and Uppinder Mehan, 2004, Arsenal Pulp Press, Vancouver, BC, Canada. (appeared in FILTER HOUSE)
- "Maggies," Dark Matter: Reading the Bones, edited by Sheree R. Thomas, 2004, NY: Warner Books. (appeared in FILTER HOUSE)
- "Matched," The Infinite Matrix (excerpt from the novel The Blazing World, co-sponsored by the Office of Arts and Cultural Affairs), May 2005.
- "Wallamelon," Aeon Speculative Fiction #3, May 2005 (website) (appeared in FILTER HOUSE)
- "Cruel Sistah," Asimov's SF Magazine, October/November 2005; Year's Best Fantasy & Horror #19, New York, NY: St. Martin's Press, August 2006.
- "But She's Only a Dream," Trabuco Road (website) March 2007 (appeared in FILTER HOUSE)
- "Little Horses" Detroit Noir, Akashic Books, November 2007 (appeared in FILTER HOUSE)

=== Novels ===
- Everfair, Tor, 2016
- Kinning, Tor, 2024
- Making Amends, Aqueduct Press 2025

=== Novellas ===
- The Day and Night Books of Mardou Fox, Rosarium Publishing, 2024

=== Non-fiction ===
- Writing the Other: A Practical Guide, with co-author Cynthia Ward, Aqueduct Press, Seattle, WA, December 2005.
- "To Jack Kerouac, to Make Much of Space and Time," Talking Back: Epistolary Fantasies, L. Timmel Duchamp (editor), Aqueduct Press, Seattle, WA, March 2006.
