= Dominion: An Anthology of Speculative Fiction from Africa and the African Diaspora =

2020 speculative fiction anthology

- Cover for Dominion Anthology
- Editors: Oghenechovwe Donald Ekpeki; Zelda Knight
- Language: English
- Genre: Speculative fiction and poetry anthology
- Publisher: Aurelia Leo
- Publication date: 2020
- Publication place: United States
- Media type: Print (Paperback), e-book
- Pages: 264
- ISBN: 9781946024886

Dominion: An Anthology of Speculative Fiction from Africa and the African Diaspora is a 2020 speculative fiction anthology edited by Oghenechovwe Donald Ekpeki and Zelda Knight. It contains thirteen works of short fiction, and a foreword by Tananarive Due. It was first published by Aurelia Leo in 2020.

== Contents ==
The anthology consists of thirteen works, including short stories, poems and novellas. Nine of the stories were originally published in Dominion, while four had been previously published.

- Foreword by Tananarive Due
- "Trickin'" by Nicole Givens Kurtz
- "Red_Bati" by Dilman Dila
- "A Maji Maji Chronicle" by Eugen Bacon - (First published in Backstory Magazine 1, no. 1, 2016)
- "The Unclean" by Nuzo Onoh - (First published in Unhallowed Graves, 2015)
- "A Mastery of German" by Marian Denise Moore
- "Convergence in Chorus Architecture" by Dare Segun Falowo
- "Emily" by Marian Denise Moore
- "To Say Nothing of Lost Figurines" by Rafeeat Aliyu
- "Sleep Papa, Sleep" by Suyi Davies Okungbowa - (First published in Lights Out: Resurrection, 2016)
- "Clanfall: Death of Kings" by Odida Nyabundi
- "The Satellite Charmer" by Mame Bougouma Diene
- "Thresher of Men" by Michael Boatman
- "Ife-Iyoku, the Tale of Imadeyunuagbon" by Oghenechovwe Donald Ekpeki - (First published in Selene Quarterly Magazine, August 2019)

== Background ==
Co-editor Olivia Raymond, under the pen name Zelda Knight, had the idea for an anthology of speculative fiction that centered Black experiences. After surviving a grease fire that left her and her family scarred, she wanted to start a project which represented "[her] Christianity, [her] Blackness, [her] Womanhood". While recovering from flash burns, she read about the historical The 1619 Project, which partly inspired the themes of Dominion. Knight approached Oghenechovwe Donald Ekpeki to co-edit. Knight had previously published Ekpeki's short story "Ife-Iyoku, the Tale of Imadeyunuagbon" in Selene Quarterly Magazine, and the story was also included in Dominion.

In an interview from September 2020, Ekpeki and Knight confirmed that Volume 2 of Dominion was in development, and would include both new and returning writers.

== Reception ==
The anthology received mostly positive reviews from critics. Fiona Moore of the British Science Fiction Association gave the anthology a positive review, particularly for its handling of Afrocentric and Afrofuturist themes, and its "re-interpretation of colonialist [science fiction] tropes such as vampires and AI." Moore compared it to So Long Been Dreaming, another anthology of speculative fiction stories from authors of color.

It was included on Den of Geek's "Best Non-Western and POC Fantasy Books in 2020." Sarah Deeming of the British Fantasy Society praised the scope of the anthology, as well as the individual quality of its collected short stories. Deeming had particular praise for Ono's "Unclean", on account of its portrayal of patriarchy and the conflict between native beliefs and Christianity.

== Awards ==
The anthology received several awards and nominations. It won the British Fantasy Award for "Best Anthology" in 2021. It was nominated for "Best Anthology" at the 2021 Locus Awards, and the 2020 This Is Horror awards.

Individual stories published in the anthology were also nominated for awards and subsequently republished. Ekpeki's "Ife-Iyoku, the Tale of Imadeyunuagbon" was nominated for a Nebula Award for Best Novella. Both "Ife-Iyoku, the Tale of Imadeyunuagbon" and Dilman Dila's "Red_Bati" were nominated for a BSFA Award for Best Short Fiction. "A Mastery of German" by Marian Denise Moore was republished in Jonathan Strahan's The Year's Best Science Fiction: Volume 2.
