= Sheree Thomas =

American writer and editor

Sheree Renée Thomas
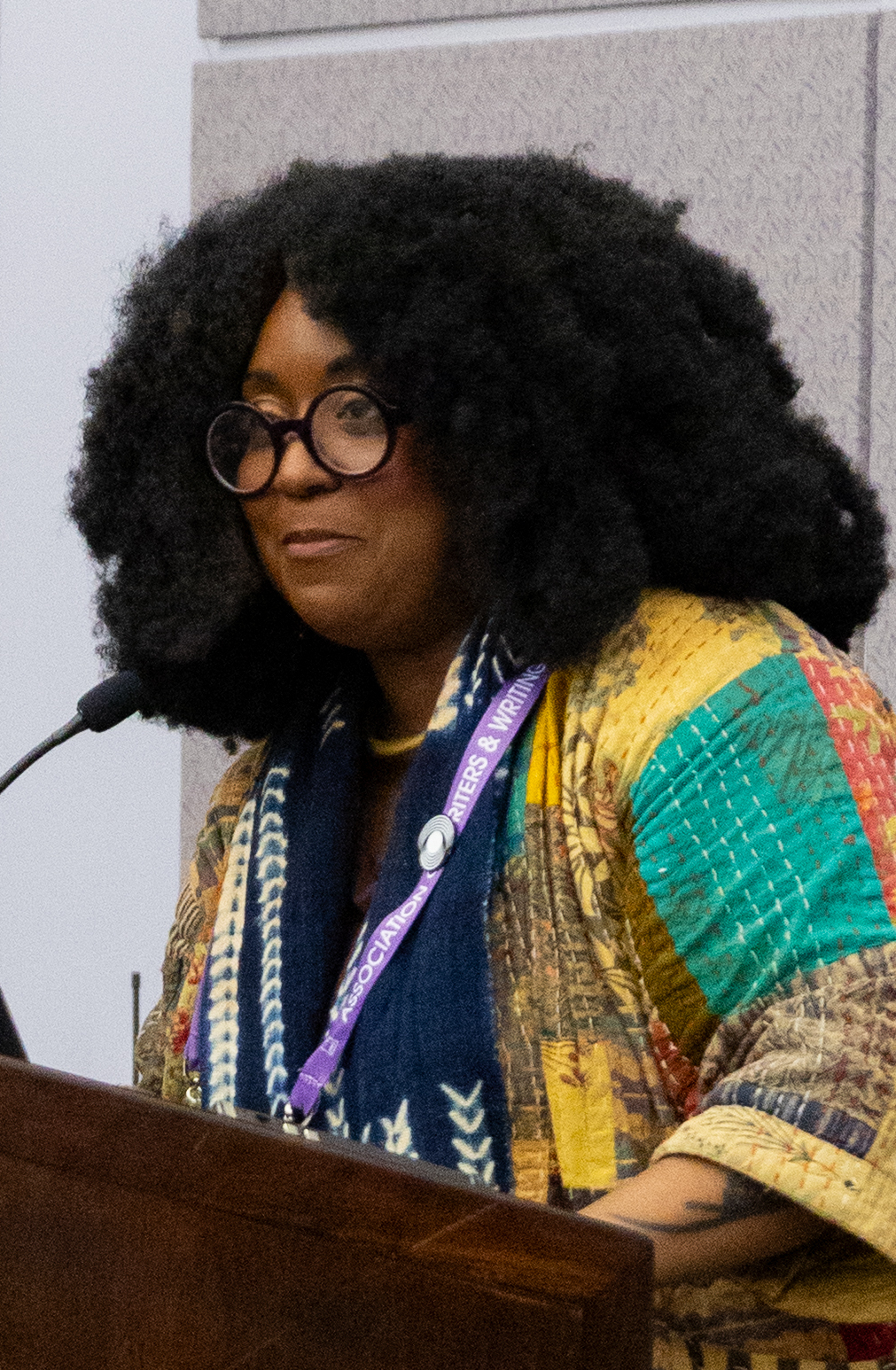
- Thomas at AWP 2025
- Born: September 30, 1972 (age 53); Memphis, Tennessee, U.S.
- Occupations: Writer, Editor, Publisher
- Writing career
- Genres: Fiction, Short Story, Poetry
- Notable awards: World Fantasy Award
- Website: shereereneethomas.com

Sheree Renée Thomas (born September 30, 1972) is an American writer, book editor, and publisher. In 2020, Thomas was named editor of The Magazine of Fantasy & Science Fiction.

== Biography ==
Born in Memphis, Tennessee, Thomas' father joined the Air Force, forcing her to travel extensively during her childhood. After spending twenty years in New York, she now resides in her hometown. Throughout her writing career, she has advocated for diversity and inclusion within the science fiction community, "good stuff is always being published. We want more “good stuff” and mo’ different good stuff, thank you! Work that reflects other lenses, other values, other world views in addition to the other good stuff that is traditionally published." However, she does not sustain her views on only African voices, but hopes to incorporate global perspectives, such as South Asian and Belgium steampunk, or Cuban science fiction, "voices that might not have been visible two decades ago." She also credits the world around being inspiration for some of her writing and the obligations writers have to address even complex topics of racism, "You want to read work that reflects yourself, your perspective, your point of view and the community around you. And if you don't see it in the work in front of you, as a writer, you're challenged to write it yourself."

== Career ==
Thomas is the editor of the Dark Matter: A Century of Speculative Fiction from the African Diaspora anthology (2000) and Dark Matter: Reading the Bones, Dark Matter, winners of the 2001 and the 2005 World Fantasy Award for Best Anthology, which collect works by many African-American writers in the genres of science fiction, horror and fantasy. Dark Matter received the 2005 and the 2001 World Fantasy Award and was named a New York Times Notable Book of the Year, and became the first Black writer to receive this recognition.

Thomas is the author of Nine Bar Blues: Stories from an Ancient Future (Third Man Books, 2020), the multigenre collections Sleeping Under the Tree of Life, longlisted for the 2016 James A. Tiptree, Jr. Award and Shotgun Lullabies: Stories & Poems, is publisher of Wanganegresse Press, and has contributed to national publications including The Washington Post, The New York Times, Book World, Black Issues Book Review, QBR, and Hip Mama. Her fiction and poetry has been widely anthologized and appears in "The Big Book of Modern Fantasy (1945-2010)," in Ishmael Reed's Konch, Drumvoices Revue, Obsidian III, African Voices, storySouth, and other literary journals, and has received Honorable Mention in the Year's Best Fantasy and Horror, 16th and 17th annual collections. She also serves as the Associate Editor of Obsidian: Literature & Arts in the African Diaspora, founded in 1975. In addition to writing and editing, she has worked in the book publishing industry, as a bookseller, and writing teacher.

== Sources ==
- Bringing Challenging Feminist Science Fiction to the Demanding Reader (Aqueduct Press)
- Thomas, Sheree Renée (The Encyclopedia of Science Fiction)
