= Nommo Awards =

African literary award

The Nommo Awards
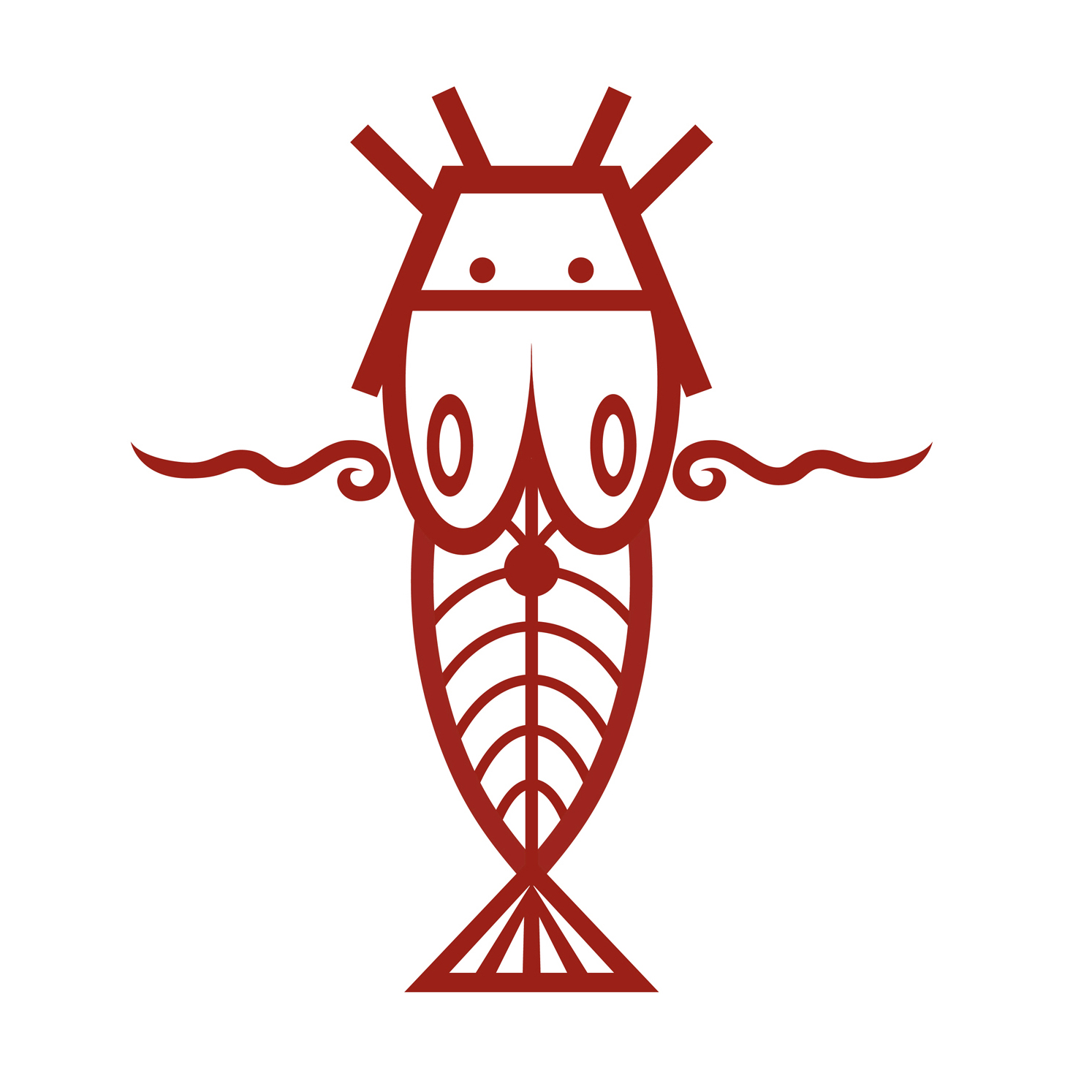
- Awarded for: Best speculative fiction work by Africans
- Presented by: The African Speculative Fiction Society
- First award: 2017
- Website: www.africansfs.com

The Nommo Awards are literary awards presented by The African Speculative Fiction Society. The awards recognize works of speculative fiction by Africans, defined as "science fiction, fantasy, stories of magic and traditional belief, alternative histories, horror and strange stuff that might not fit in anywhere else."

The Nommo Awards have four categories: Best Novel, Novella, Short Story, and Graphic Novel. They are named after the Nommo, ancestral spirits from Dogon cosmology who take a variety of forms, including appearing on land as fish, walking on their tails.

== The African Speculative Fiction Society ==
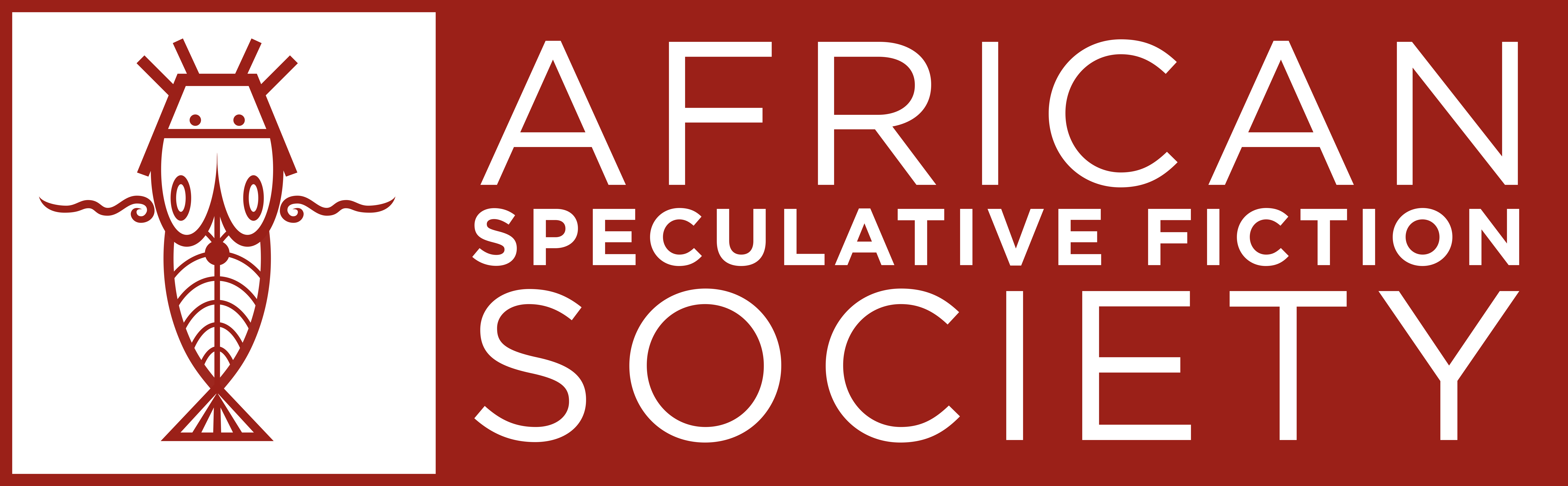
The African Speculative Fiction Society Logo designed by Stephen Embleton August 2016

The African Speculative Fiction Society (ASFS) promotes science fiction and fantasy by Africans. Its members include writers, editors, artists and publishers. Established August 15, 2016 with 58 charter members, the ASFS and its Nommo Awards is a body for African science fiction/fantasy professionals.

Members nominate and vote on the Nommo Awards for African Speculative Fiction.

“The ASFS will provide a place where writers, readers, and scholars can come together to find information, connect with each other, and act as watchdogs for their collective interests.” Chinelo Onwualu, co-founder of Omenana

== Logo design ==
The Nommo Awards logo and ASFS logos were designed in 2016 by Stephen Embleton. The logo is an image of the Nommo in Dogon cosmology, twins who on land can take the form of fish walking on their tails.

"The Nommo are mythological ancestral spirits (sometimes referred to as deities) worshipped by the Dogon people of Mali. The word Nommos is derived from a Dogon word meaning "to make one drink." The Nommos are usually described as amphibious, hermaphroditic, fish-like creatures. Folk art depictions of the Nommos show creatures with humanoid upper torsos, legs/feet, and a fish-like lower torso and tail. The Nommos are also referred to as “Masters of the Water”, “the Monitors”, and "the Teachers”. Nommo can be a proper name of an individual, or can refer to the group of spirits as a whole. For purposes of this article “Nommo” refers to a specific individual and “Nommos” is used to reference the group of beings."

== Winners and short list nominees ==
=== Novel ===
The Novel Award is also known as The Ilube Nommo Award for Best Speculative Fiction Novel by an African. It is named for and sponsored by Tom Ilube.

Year	Author	Novel	Publisher	Ref.
2017	Tade Thompson*	Rosewater	Orbit	
2017	A. Igoni Barrett	Blackass	Graywolf Press	
2017	Shadreck Chikoti	Azotus, The Kingdom	Pan African Publishers	
2017	Nikhil Singh	Taty Went West	Rosarium Publishing	
2017	Nick Wood	Azanian Bridges	NewCon Press	
2018	Tochi Onyebuchi*	Beasts Made of Night	Penguin Young Readers Group	
2018	Gavin Chait	Our Memory Like Dust	Doubleday	
2018	Deon Meyer	Fever	Grove/Atlantic, Inc.	
2018	Nnedi Okorafor	Akata Warrior	Penguin Young Readers Group	
2018	Deji Bryce Olokotun	After the Flare	The Unnamed Press	
2018	Masha du Toit	The Real	CreateSpace Publishing	
2019	Akwaeke Emezi*	Freshwater	Grove Press	
2019	Tomi Adeyemi	Children of Blood and Bone	Henry Holt and Co	
2019	Nechama Brodie	Knucklebone	Pan Macmillan	
2019	Imraan Coovadia	A Spy in Time	Rare Bird Books	
2019	Cat Hellisen	Empty Monsters	Amazon	
2019	Masha du Toit	The Strange	Independently Published	
2020	Suyi Davies Okungbowa*	David Mogo, Godhunter	Abaddon	
2020	Nerine Dorman	Sing Down the Stars	Tafelberg	
2020	Masande Ntshanga	Triangulum	Penguin Random House South Africa & Two Dollar Radio	
2020	Tochi Onyebuchi	War Girls	Razorbill	
2020	Namwali Serpell	The Old Drift	Hogarth	
2020	Tade Thompson	The Rosewater Insurrection	Orbit	
2021	Akwaeke Emezi*	The Death of Vivek Oji	Riverhead	
2021	Stephen Embleton	Soul Searching	Guardbridge	
2021	Nikhil Singh	Club Ded	Luna	
2022	T.L. Huchu*	The Library of the Dead	Tor	
2022	T. J. Benson	The Madhouse	Penguin South Africa	
2022	Namina Forna	The Gilded Ones	Delacorte/Usborne	
2022	Suyi Davies Okungbowa	Son of the Storm	Orbit US/Orbit UK	
2022	Cheryl S. Ntumy	They Made Us Blood and Fury	Self Published	
2022	Tade Thompson	Far from the Light of Heaven	Orbit US/Orbit UK	
2024 (Note: Because no awards were presented in 2023, works published in 2022 and 2023 are both eligible for the 2024 award)	Wole Talabi*	Shigidi and the Brass Head of Obalufon	DAW	
2024	Stephen Embleton	Bones and Runes	Abibiman Publishing	
2024	Chikodili Emelumadu	Dazzling	Wildfire	
2024	Suyi Davies Okungbowa	Warrior of the Wind	Orbit	
2024	Ukamaka Olisakwe	Don't Answer When They Call Your Name	Griots Lounge	
2024	Eloghosa Osunde	Vagabonds!	Riverhead	
2025	Tlotlo Tsamaase*	Womb City	Kensington	
2025	Erhu Kome	The Smoke That Thunders	Norton Young Readers	
2025	Nikhil Singh	Dakini Atoll	Luna Press Publishing	
2025	Umar Abubakar Sidi	The Incredible Dreams of Garba Dakaskus	Masobe	
2026	Marvellous Michael Anson	Firstborn of the Sun		
2026	Modupe H. Ayinde	A Song of Legends Lost		
2026	Nkereuwem Albert	The Bone River		
2026	Nnedi Okorafor	Death of the Author		
2026	Paul Olisaeloka Anozie	Black Navel		
2026	T.L. Huchu	Secrets of the First School		

=== Novella ===
Year	Author(s)	Novella	Publisher	Ref.
2017	Nnedi Okorafor*	Binti	Tor.com Publishing	
2017	Mame Bougouma Diene	Hell Freezes Over	StoryTime	
2017	Dilman Dila	The Flying Man of Stone	StoryTime	
2017	Muthi Nhlema	Ta O'Reva	Freeeditorial.com	
2017	Tade Thompson & Nick Wood	The Last Pantheon	StoryTime	
2018	Tade Thompson*	The Murders of Molly Southbourne	Tor.com Publishing	
2018	Sofia Samatar	Fallow	Small Beer Press	
2018	Nnedi Okorafor	Binti: Home	Tor.com Publishing	
2019	Nerine Dorman*	The Firebird	Amazon	
2019	Caldon Mull	Neid-Fire	Amazon	
2019	Nnedi Okorafor	Binti: The Night Masquerade	Tor.com Publishing	
2019	Sofia Samatar	Hard Mary	Lightspeed	
2020	Wole Talabi*	Incompleteness Theories	Incomplete Solutions	
2020	Kerstin Hall	The Border Keeper	Tor.com Publishing	
2020	Caldon Mull	Weatherman	Self-Published	
2021	Oghenechovwe Donald Ekpeki*	Ife-Iyoku: The Tale of Imadeyunuagbon	Dominion	
2021	David A. Atta	Guardians: The Awakening	Makere	
2021	Dilman Dila	A Fledgling Abiba	Guardbridge	
2021	Tochi Onyebuchi	Riot Baby	Tordotcom	
2021	Tlotlo Tsamaase	The Silence of the Wilting Skin	Pink Narcissus	
2022	Nnedi Okorafor*	Remote Control	Tordotcom	
2022	Dilman Dila	The Future God of Love	Luna	
2022	Kola Heyward-Rotimi	An Exploration of Nicole Otieno’s Early Filmography (1232-1246)	Strange Horizons (9/13/21)	
2022	Erhu Kome	Not Seeing is a Flower	Eraserhead	
2022	Nuzo Onoh	The Abomination	F&SF9 (10/21)	
2024	Stephen Embleton*	Undulation		
2024	Eugen Bacon	Broken Paradise	Luna Press	
2024	Oghenechovwe Donald Ekpeki & Joshua Uchenna Omenga	Land of the Awaiting Birth		
2024	Moses Ose Utomi	The Lies of the Ajungo	Tordotcom	
2025	Suyi Davies Okungbowa*	Lost Ark Dreaming	Tor Publishing Group	
2025	Ivana Akotowaa Ofori	The Year of Return	Android Press	
2025	Tobi Ogundiran	In the Shadow of the Fall	Titan Books	
2025	Sofia Samatar	The Practice, the Horizon, and the Chain	Tordotcom	
2026	Moses Ose Utomi	The Memory of the Ogisi		
2026	Nnedi Okorafor	One Way Witch		
2026	Tobi Ogundiran	At the Fount of Creation		

=== Short Story ===
Year	Author	Short Story	Publication	Ref.
2017	Lesley Nneka Arimah*	"Who Will Greet You At Home"		
2017	Tendai Huchu*	"The Marriage Plot"		
2017	Innocent Immaculate Acan	"Sundown"		
2017	Blaize Kaye	"Ndakusuwa"		
2017	Wole Talabi	"Wednesday's Story"		
2018	Wole Talabi*	"The Regression Test"		
2018	Nerine Dorman	"On the Other Side of the Sea"		
2018	Sibongile Fisher	"A Door Ajar"		
2018	Chinelo Onwualu	"Read Before Use"		
2018	Henrietta Rose-Innes	"Snake Story"		
2019	Oghenechovwe Donald Ekpeki*	"The Witching Hour"	Cosmic Roots and Eldritch Stones	
2019	Tiah Marie Beautement	"Momento Mori"	Omenana Magazine	
2019	Tendai Huchu	"Njuzu"	AfroSFV3	
2019	Blaize Kaye	"Brand New Ways (to lose you over and over again)"	Omenana	
2019	Derek Lubangakene	"Origami Angels"	Omenana	
2019	Biram Mboob	"The Luminal Frontier"	AfroSFV3	
2019	Cristy Zinn	"The Girl Who Stared at Mars"	AfroSFV3	
2020	Chikodili Emelumadu*	"Sin Eater"	Omenana Magazine	
2020	Ada Nnadi*	"Tiny Bravery"	Omenana	
2020	Ivana Akotowaa Ofori	"Principles of Balance"	Jalada	
2020	Suyi Davies Okungbowa	"The Haunting of 13 Olúwo Street"	Fireside	
2020	Deji Bryce Olukotun	"Between the Dark and the Dark"	Lightspeed	
2020	Wole Talabi	"When We Dream We Are Our God"	Apex	
2021	Innocent Chizaram Ilo*	"Rat and Finch Are Friends"	Strange Horizons (3/2/20)	
2021	Tlotlo Tsamaase*	"Behind Our Irises"	Africanfuturism: An Anthology	
2021	Tiah Marie Beautement	"The Bend of Water"	Omenana (8/30/20)	
2021	Tendai Huchu	"Corialis"	Fiyah (Autumn '19)	
2021	Tobi Ogundiran	"The Goatkeeper’s Harvest"	The Dark (9/20)	
2022	Pemi Aguda*	"Masquerade Season"	Tor.com (3/24/21)	
2022	Oghenechovwe Donald Ekpek	"O2 Arena"	Galaxy's Edge (11/21)	
2022	Mbozie Haimbre	"Shelter"	Disruption	
2022	Shingai Njeri Kagunda	"And This Is How to Stay Alive"	Fantasy (11/20)	
2022	Tobi Ogundiran	"The Many Lives of an Abiku"	Beneath Ceaseless Skies (7/30/20)	
2022	Makena Onjerika	"The Brother"	Professor Charlatan Bardot’s Travel Anthology to the Most (Fictional) Haunted Buildings in the Weird, Wild World	
2022	Wole Talabi	"An Arc of Electric Skin"	Asimov's (9-10/21)	
2022	Tlotlo Tsamaase	"Dreamports"	Apex (12/21)	
2024	Gabrielle Emem Harry*	"A Name is a Plea and a Prophecy"	Strange Horizons, 2023	
2024	Moustapha Mbacké Diop	"Blackwater Children"	Haven Speculative Fiction, 2022	
2024	Oghenechovwe Donald Ekpeki	"Destiny Delayed"	Asimov's Science Fiction, 2022	
2024	Victor Forna	"Kɛrozin Lamp Kurfi"	Apex Magazine, 2023	
2024	Somoto Iheuze	"Like Stars Daring to Shine"	Fireside Fiction 2022 and Escape Pod 2023	
2024	Solomon Uhiara	"Loom"	Dark Matter Magazine, 2022	
2024	Naomi Eselojor	"My Mother's Love"	Hexagon, 2022	
2024	Chinaza Eziaghighala	"Osimiri"	British Science Fiction Association’s Fission 2 Vol 1 Anthology.	
2024	Cheryl S. Ntumy	"The Way of Baa'gh"	Mothersound: The Sauútiverse Anthology, Android Press, 2023	
2025	Chisom Umeh*	"From Across Time"	Clarkesworld	
2025	Plangdi Neple	"Bodies of Sand and Blood"	Cast of Wonders	
2025	Mwenya Chikwa	"The Future Ancients"	WTBAP	
2025	Damilola Oyedotun	"Warning Notes from an Annihilator Machine"	Lightspeed	
2026	Adelehin Ijasan	"A Heap of Petrified Gods"		
2026	Kevin Rigathi	"If Memory Serves"		
2026	Plangdi Neple	"Full, Empty Houses"		
2026	Moustapha Mbacké Diop	"Apostasy in Fruit"		
2026	Somto Ihezue	"We Begin Where Infinity Ends "		
2026	T.L. Huchu	"The Cancellation of Michael Z"		

=== Graphic Novel ===
Year	Artist(s) & Author(s)	Graphic Novel	Publisher	Ref.
2017	Chronic No. 3 Various writers & artists*	The Corpse Exhibition		
2017	Ibrahim Ganiyu, Chike Newman Nwankwo & Akinwade Ayodeji Akinola	June 12		
2017	Xavier Ighorodje & Stanley Obende	Avonome		
2017	Jide Martin & Toheeb Deen Ipaye	Might of Guardian Prime		
2018	Kwabena Ofei & Setor Fiadzigbey*	Lake of Tears		
2018	Wale Awelenje & Jide Martin	Guardian Prime Genesis	The Comic Republic	
2018	Michael Balogun & Adeleye Yusuf	Ireti Bidemi	The Comic Republic	
2018	Tobe Ezeogu & Keith Issac	Hero Kakere	The Comic Republic	
2018	Tobe Ezeogu & Ozo Ezeogu	Eru	The Comic Republic	
2018	Robert S. Malan & John Cockshaw	Quest of the Sign of the Shining Beast		
2019	Nnedi Okorafor & Leonardo Romero*	Shuri	Marvel Comics	
2019	Marguerite Abouet, Mathieu Sapin, Judith Taboy, & Marie Bédrune	Akissi: Tales of Michief	Flying Eye Books	
2019	Farida Bedwei & Ravi Allotey	Karmzah	Afrocomix App, Leti Arts	
2019	Tobe Max Ezeogu & Ozo Ezeogu	Eru	The Comic Republic	
2019	Cassandra Mark & Tobe Max Ezeogu	Tàtàshé	The Comic Republic	
2019	Loyiso Mkize, Mohale Mashigo, & Clyde Beech	Kwezi	New Africa Books	
2019	Luke Molver	Shaka Rising	StoryPress Africa	
2019	Nnedi Okorafor, André Araújo, Mario Del Pennino, Tana Ford, & Aaron Covington	Black Panther: Long Live the King	Marvel Comics	
2019	Roye Okupe & Chima Kalu	Malika Warrior Queen Part Two	YouNeek Studios	
2019	Austine Osas, Abiodun Awodele, & Yusuf Temitope	Under the Sun	Pedacomics Ltd	
2019	Yvonne Wanyoike, Kendi Mberia, & Salim Busuru	Rovik	Vibondu Comics, Avandu	
2020	Morakinyo Araoye, Steven Akinyemi, & Ogim Ekpezu*	Danfo	TAG Comics	
2020	Ssentongo Charles	Sanu	Elupe Comics	
2020	Beserat Debebe & Stanley Obende	Hawi	Etan Comics	
2020	Mika Hirwa	Kami	Mira Hirwa	
2020	Kiprop Kimutai & Salim Busuru	Beast from Venus	Avandu Vosi	
2020	Bill Masuku	Captain South Africa	Enigma Comix	
2020	Bill Masuku	Welcome to the Dead World	Sam Graphico Anthology	
2020	Ziki Nelson & Jason Lamy	Nani	Kugali Comics	
2021	Nana Akosua Hanson & AnimaxFYB*	MoonGirls	Drama Queens	
2021	Murewa Ayodele & Dotun Akande	New Men	Action Lab – Danger Zone	
2021	Mazuba Chimbeza	Titan	Black Hut	
2021	Qintu Collab	Meanwhile…	MaThoko’s	
2021	Anna Mbale & Mwiche Songolo	Alex	Black Hut	
2021	Mwiche Songolo	Black Sheep	Black Hut	
2022	Roye Okupe & Godwin Akpan*	Iyanu: Child of Wonder, Volume 2	Dark Horse	
2022	Awele Emili	The Ijournal	AweleEmili.com	
2024	Mamode Ogbewele and Chigozie Amadi*	Grimm's Assistant	Mode Comics, 2023	
2024	Daniël Hugo	Die Strandloper	Dream Press & Daniël Hugo, 2022	
2024	Roye Okupe and Sunkanmi Akinboye	WindMaker volume 1	Dark Horse Comics, 2022	
2025	John Uche and Francis Goodluck*	Celestial Eyes Vol. 1	The Machine Publishing	
2025	Dotun Akande and Murewa Ayodele	Akogun: Brutalizer of Gods	Oni Press	
2025	Murewa Ayodele, Mamode Ogbewele, Dotun Akande, and Samuel Iwunze	You Have Ten Years	Collectible Comics	
2026	Gerald Vreden and Hakeem Rafai	Rise of The Mafu #1: The Awakening		
2026	Juni Ba	The Fables of Erlking Wood		
2026	John Uche and Francis Goodluck	Celestial Eyes Vol. 2: The Second Cycle		
2026	John Uche and Stone Otor, Francis Goodluck, Lord Blue, Jeremiah Abah & Gabriel Onche	Worlds: A One-shot Anthology		
