= Binti =

Binti may refer to:

- Binti, female title of respect "daughter of" in Malaysian names
- Binti Jua, female western gorilla in the Brookfield Zoo, outside Chicago
- Binti (2019 film), Belgian film
- Binti (2021 film), a Tanzanian drama film
- Binti Trilogy, a series of novellas by Nnedi Okorafor
  - Binti (novella), the first in the trilogy
  - Binti: Home, the second novella in the series
  - Binti: The Night Masquerade, the third and final novella in the series
