= Third Generation of Nigerian Writers =

Modern Nigerian literature classification

The Third Generation of Nigeria Writers is an emerging phase of Nigerian literature, in which there is a major shift in both the method of publishing and the themes explored. This set of writers are known for writing post-independence novels and poems. (Note: They have also been referred to as Twenty-first century writer, Fourth generation writers and Fifth generation writers) This generation is believed to be influenced by the western world, politics and the preceding generation of Mbari Club writers, Flora Nwapa and Buchi Emecheta. The emergence of the third generation of Nigerian writers has changed the publishing sector with a resurgence of new publishing firms such as Kachifo Limited, Parrésia Publishers, Cassava Republic Press and Farafina Books. These new writers create new genres and methods that deal with racism, class, abuse, and violence.

== Etymology ==
The word was coined by Nigeria author Professor Pius Adesanmi and Chris Dunton in their publication titled Nigeria's Third Generation Writing: Historiography and Preliminary Theoretical Considerations in 2005.

== Beginning ==
Since the early 1990s, several novels have been published to mark the advent of the third generation of Nigerian writers. During this time, some Nigerian writers wrote breakaway literature writings, which were quite different from the norm; such writings include: The Famished Road (1991) by Ben Okri, The Icarus Girl (2005) by Helen Oyeyemi, GraceLand (2004) by Chris Abani and Masters of the Board also by Chris Abani amongst other.

== Breakout ==
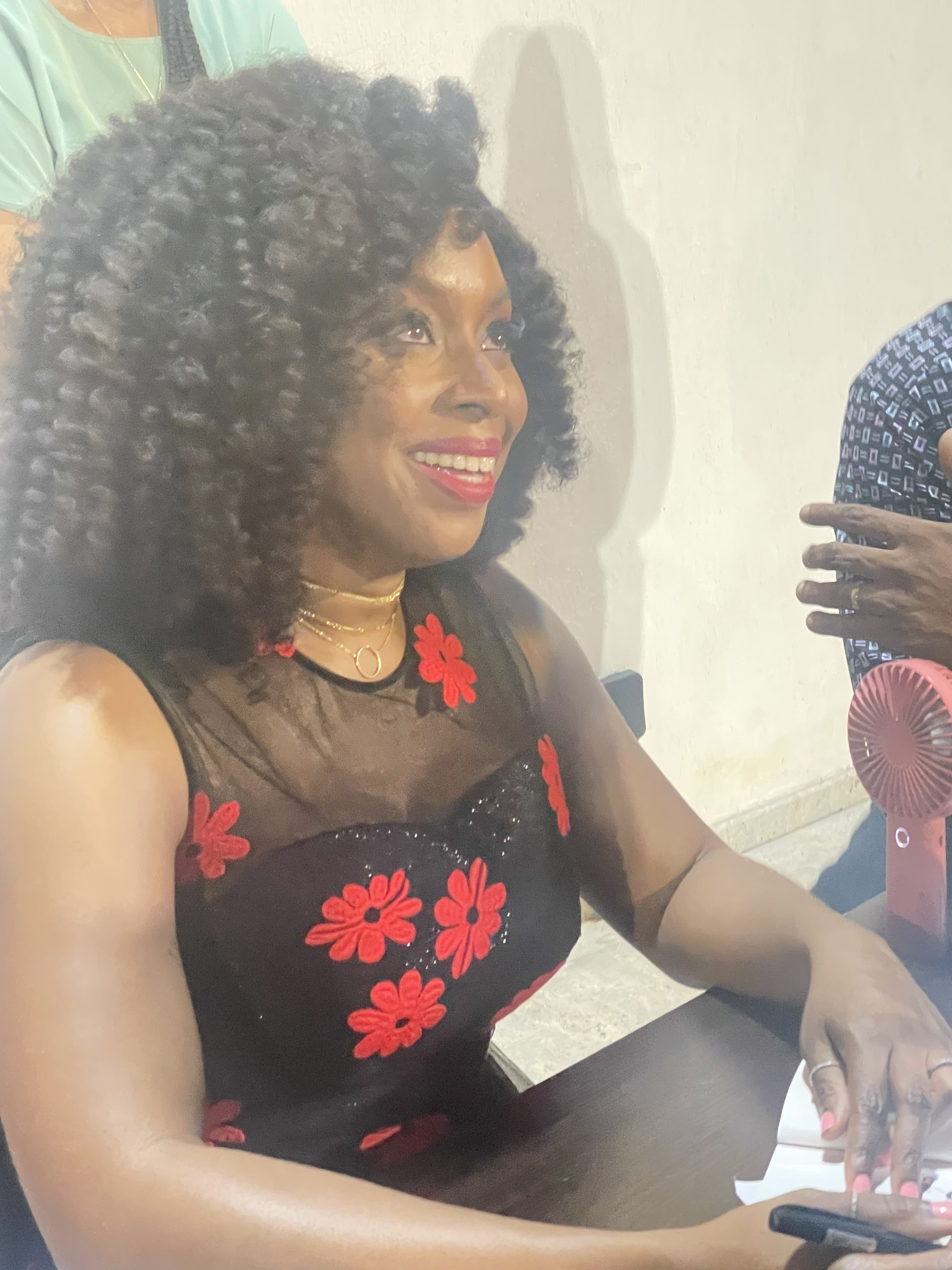
Chimamanda Ngozi Adichie, one of the third generation of Nigerian writers

The third generation of Nigerian writers have experimented with different genres and styles. The most prominent of the third generation of writers is conceived to be Chimamanda Ngozi Adichie, who started off with Purple Hibiscus. Another is Okey Ndibe, whose debut novel Arrows of Rain "has been applauded as a faithful representation of social consciousness and political activism that run through the third-generation of Nigerian novelists". Helon Habila, whose Waiting for an Angel has been said to be interwoven with that of Adichie's and Ndibe's. Another of the notable events is the emergence of Africanfuturism, a genre pioneered by Nigerian American writer Nnedi Okorafor. This has led to the introduction of speculative fiction to the Nigerian literary space, with writers such as Suyi Davies Okungbowa, Mazi Nwonwu, Oghenechovwe Donald Ekpeki, Chinelo Onwualu, Tade Thompson, A. Igoni Barrett, Dandy Jackson Chukwudi taking on the new genre. Mazi Nwonwu, writing for Strange Horizons, described the new set of stories as being part of a "tradition of spinning tales." In Comics, third generation comics exist: Comic Republic Global Network, a Lagos-based publisher, is prominent in creating Africanfuturist superheroes like Guardian Prime. Laguardia, a comic book by Nnedi Okorafor, is also associated with Africanfuturism.

== Use of new media ==
The third generation of Nigerian writers has used new media technology as a medium to showcase their stories and poetry to a worldwide audience. This new medium has introduced the use of literary magazines such as Omenana, Saraba, and Jalada, as a means of publishing and distributihg independently. This has been criticised by such Nigerian critics as Sinatu Ojikutu, Charles Nnolim, Ikhide Ikheloa, Niyi Osundare and Olu Obafemi.

== See also ==
- Nigerian Literature
- Igbo literature
- Yoruba literature
- Efik literature
