= Wole Talabi =

Nigerian author (born 1986)

- Born: Oluwole Talabi; 28 February 1986 (age 40); Warri, Delta State, Nigeria
- Other name: The Alchemist
- Education: Obafemi Awolowo University (BA); Imperial College London (MSc)
- Occupations: Author, editor
- Notable work: Africanfuturism: An Anthology (2020); Shigidi and the Brass Head of Obalufon (2023); Convergence Problems (2024)
- Website: wtalabi.wordpress.com

Oluwole Talabi (born 28 February 1986) is a Nigerian science fiction writer, engineer, and editor, who is considered among the Third Generation of Nigerian Writers.

== Early life and education ==
Talabi was raised in Warri, Delta, a city in southern Nigeria, where his father was a chemical engineer, before later moving to Benin City and then later Lagos. He studied chemical engineering at Obafemi Awolowo University and earned a master's degree with distinction at Imperial College London.

== Career ==
Talabi then worked as an engineer, and partway through his career began to write professionally. He stated that he had never been formally trained in writing except for two online classes from the University of Edinburgh and the University of Michigan, but he had written stories since learning to read as a child.

His works include an amount of short stories; the anthologies These Words Expose Us: An Anthology (2014), Lights Out: Resurrection (2016), Africanfuturism: An Anthology (2020).

Incomplete Solutions, published in 2019, was Talabi's first published collection of short stories, covering five years of his writing. The stories are from a range of speculative genres but also include non-speculative romance, and they explore contradicting philosophies and levels of hope, but often have themes of choice and identity. They embed Nigerian culture and perspectives without explaining them to unfamiliar readers. Adri Joy, reviewing for Strange Horizons, praised the intriguing, fun and varied nature of the stories, while wishing for fewer male-centered or chauvinistic perspectives.

Talabi published his debut novel Shigidi and the Brass Head of Obalufon in 2023. Shigidi is a Yoruba god of nightmares who wants to get out of his minimum wage job at the Orisha Spirit Company. Shigidi's lover Nneoma, a succubus, helps him pull off a heist so he can leave: they have been tasked with stealing back the heavily protected brass head of Obalufon from the British Museum. Chris Kluwe, reviewing for Lightspeed, praised the novel and said the pair's relationship and themes of capitalism and colonialism drive the story. Gary K. Wolfe, reviewing for Locus, praised the book's balance of genre elements, keeping the "kinetic mix of noir heist fiction, erotic romance, political intrigue, and supernatural fireworks without distracting too much from the genuinely affecting relationship between Nneoma and Shigidi." Architra Mittra, for Strange Horizons, also praised the book's balance of genre and its entertaining exploration of heavy themes, but criticized the stereotypical elements of the main relationship.

Convergence Problems, a collection released in 2024, focused on more traditional science fiction themes, with ideas, characterization, and Nigerian culture driving the pieces.

He was described in Scientific American as "an author who blends transhumanism and the Turing test".

Talabi has been a manager of a database of speculative fiction by African authors on the African Speculative Fiction Society website. Talabi is a founding charter member of the society.

== Personal life ==
He married Rocío Vizuete Fernandez in 2023 in Madrid, Spain. Talabi has previously lived in Mexico, England, and Malaysia.

== Awards and recognition ==
Awards and recognition
| Year | Work | Award | Category | Result | Ref. |
|---|---|---|---|---|---|
| 2017 | "Wednesday's Story" | Nommo Award | Short Story | Finalist | |
| 2018 | "Wednesday's Story" | Caine Prize | — | Shortlisted | |
| 2018 | "The Regression Test" | Nommo Award | Short Story | Won | |
| 2020 | Incompleteness Theories | Nommo Award | Novella | Won | |
| 2020 | "When We Dream We Are Our God" | Nommo Award | Short Story | Finalist | |
| 2021 | Africanfuturism: An Anthology | Locus Award | Anthology | Finalist | |
| 2022 | "An Arc of Electric Skin" | Locus Award | Short Story | Finalist | |
| 2022 | "An Arc of Electric Skin" | Nommo Award | Short Story | Finalist | |
| 2022 | "Blowout" | Jim Baen Memorial Short Story Award | — | Honorable Mention | |
| 2022 | "Drift-Flux" | Canopus Award | Short-Form Fiction | Finalist | |
| 2022 | "Preliminary Observations From An Incomplete History of African SFF" | BSFA Award | Non-Fiction | Shortlisted | |
| 2022 | "A Dream of Electric Mothers" | Nebula Award | Novelette | Nominated | |
| 2022 | "A Dream of Electric Mothers" | Sidewise Award for Alternate History | Short Form | Won | |
| 2023 | "A Dream of Electric Mothers" | Hugo Award | Novelette | Finalist | |
| 2023 | "A Dream of Electric Mothers" | Locus Award | Novelette | Finalist | |
| 2023 | Mothersound: The Sauútiverse Anthology | BSFA Award | Collection | Shortlisted | |
| 2023 | "Preliminary Observations From An Incomplete History of African SFF" | Ignyte Award | Creative Nonfiction | Finalist | |
| 2023 | "Prisoners in the Temple of the Muses" | BSFA Award | Non-fiction (short) | Shortlisted | |
| 2023 | "Saturday's Song" | Nebula Award | Novelette | Nominated | |
| 2023 | Shigidi and the Brass Head of Obalufon | BSFA Award | Novel | Shortlisted | |
| 2023 | Shigidi and the Brass Head of Obalufon | Nebula Award | Novel | Nominated | |
| 2024 | Convergence Problems | BSFA Award | Collection | Shortlisted | |
| 2024 | Mothersound: The Sauútiverse Anthology | British Fantasy Award | Anthology | Shortlisted | |
| 2024 | Mothersound: The Sauútiverse Anthology | Locus Award | Anthology | Finalist | |
| 2024 | Shigidi and the Brass Head of Obalufon | British Fantasy Award | Fantasy Novel | Shortlisted | |
| 2024 | Shigidi and the Brass Head of Obalufon | Crawford Award | — | Honorable Mention | |
| 2024 | Shigidi and the Brass Head of Obalufon | Ignyte Award | Adult Novel | Finalist | |
| 2024 | Shigidi and the Brass Head of Obalufon | Locus Award | First Novel | Finalist | |
| 2024 | Shigidi and the Brass Head of Obalufon | Nommo Award | Novel | Won | |
| 2024 | Shigidi and the Brass Head of Obalufon | World Fantasy Award | Novel | Finalist | |
| 2024 | "Unquiet on the Eastern Front" | BSFA Award | Short Fiction | Shortlisted | |
| 2025 | —N/a | Ignyte Award | Community Award | Nominated | |
| 2025 | Convergence Problems | Locus Award | Collection | Finalist | |
| 2025 | Descent | BSFA Award | Shorter Fiction | Shortlisted | |
| 2025 | Descent | Nebula Award | Novella | Nominated | |
| 2025 | "Encore" | Locus Award | Novelette | Finalist | |
| 2025 | Shigidi and the Brass Head of Obalufon | Aldiss Award | — | Shortlisted | |
| 2026 | "Blowout" | Seiun Award | Translated Short Story | Finalist | |
| 2026 | Descent | Ignyte Award | Novella | Finalist | |

After winning his third Nommo Award in 2024, and having won in all three prose categories, he announced that he would decline any future nominations to clear the field for new writers.

== Bibliography ==
=== Novels ===
- — (8 August 2023). Shigidi and the Brass Head of Obalufon. DAW Books. ISBN 9780756418939.
- Forthcoming: — (27 October 2026). The Fist of Memory. DAW Books. ISBN 9780756418243.

=== Collections ===
- — (4 June 2019). Incomplete Solutions. Luna Press Publishing. ISBN 9781911143550.
- — (13 February 2024). Convergence Problems. DAW Books. ISBN 9780756418830.

=== Anthologies ===
- —, ed. (1 September 2014). These Words Expose Us: An Anthology. CreateSpace. ISBN 9781500207175.
- —, ed. (13 October 2016). Lights Out: Resurrection. CreateSpace. ISBN 9781539342724.
- —, ed. (19 October 2020). Africanfuturism: An Anthology. Brittle Paper. Full text online.
- —, ed. (21 November 2023). Mothersound: The Sauútiverse Anthology. Android Press. ISBN 9781958121603.

=== Short Fiction ===
This list includes short fiction published in anthologies, magazines, and websites. Short works that are original to Talabi's own collections are not included here.

The Weekdays

- — (16 December 2014). "Thursday". The Kalahari Review.
- — (May 2016). "Wednesday's Story". Lightspeed. No. 72.
  - Reprinted: "Wednesday's Story". Redemption Song and Other Stories: The Caine Prize for African Writing 2018. New Internationalist. 2 July 2018. ISBN 9781780264615.
- — (May 2023). "Saturday's Song". Lightspeed. No. 156.
  - Reprinted: Ekpeki, Oghenechovwe Donald; Eziaghighala, Chinaza, eds. (4 March 2025). "Saturday's Song". The Year's Best African Speculative Fiction (2023). Phoenix Pick. ISBN 9781649731715.

BLOMBOS 7090 and 4020

- — (March 2019). "Debut". Overseas Magazine.
- — (8 October 2024). "Encore". In Das, Indrapramit (ed.). Deep Dream: Science Fiction Exploring the Future of Art. MIT Press. ISBN 9780262549080.
  - Reprinted: — (April 2025). "Encore". Omenana Magazine. No. 32.
  - Reprinted: — (13 June 2025). "Encore". In Kaster, Allan (ed.). The Year's Top Hard Science Fiction Stories 9. Infinivox. ISBN 9781884612824.

Standalone short fiction

- — (December 2011). "The Human Thing". TheNakedConvos.
  - Reprinted: — (12 October 2015). "The Human Thing". Sub-Saharan Magazine.
- —; Odukwe, Chioma; Oyekole, Oyekola; Oluwole, Bankola; Fatona, Adeyemi; Falowo, Damilare; Ekwe, Martin (August 2012). "False Lives" (PDF). AfroSays. Illustrated by Laolu Senbanjo.
- — (13 November 2012). "Transmission". BellaNaija Prose.
- — (December 2012). "Sakura". TheNakedConvos.
- — (19 November 2013). "Silence". BellaNaija Prose.
  - Reprinted: These Words Expose Us: An Anthology
- — (December 2013). "Connectome, Or, The Facts in the Case of Miss Valerie DeMarco, (Ph.D)". TheNakedConvos.
- — (April 2014). "Zombies". Klorofyl.
- — (April 2014). "Gamma: Or, Love in the Age of Radiation Poisoning". The Kalahari Review.
- — (December 2014). "Crocodile Ark". Omenana Magazine. No. 1. Illustrated by David Motutu.
- — (December 2014). "Lights in the Sky". TheNakedConvos.
- — (February 2015). "Eye". Liquid Imagination. No. 24.
- — (June 2015). "Liar". Wazi.
- — (June 2015). "A Short History of Migration in Five Fragments of You". Omenana Magazine. No. 3.
- — (July 2015). "The In-Between Places". Klorofyl. No. 5.
- — (August 2015). "Parse. Error. Reset". Terraform.
  - Reprinted: — (16 August 2022). "Parse. Error. Reset.". In Merchant, Brian; Evans, Claire L. (eds.). Terraform: Watch/Worlds/Burn. MCD x FSG Originals. ISBN 9780374602666.
- — (22 February 2016). "Nested". Sci Phi Journal.
- — (1 June 2016). "If They Can Learn". In Hoster, Chester W.; Stauber, Katy (eds.). Futuristica: Volume 1. Metasagas Press. ISBN 9781939120069.
- — (5 September 2016). "Necessary and Sufficient Conditions". In Kahora, Billy (ed.). Imagine Africa 500: Speculative Fiction from Africa. Pan African Publishers. ASIN B01LNE7B4Y.
  - Reprinted: — (12 February 2019). "Necessary and Sufficient Conditions". Apex Magazine.
- — (5 September 2016). "I, Shigidi". Abyss & Apex Magazine.
- — (October 2016). "The Million Eyes of a Lonely and Fragile God". Stupefying Stories.
- — (November 2016). "The Last Lagosian". Omenana Magazine. No. 8.
- — (January 2017). "The Regression Test". The Magazine of Fantasy & Science Fiction.
  - Reprinted: — (July 2017). "The Regression Test". The Manchester Review.
  - Reprinted: — (15 June 2021). "The Regression Test". In Ross, Tia (ed.). Black Sci-Fi Short Stories. Flame Tree Publishing. ISBN 9781839644801.
  - Reprinted: — (1 November 2022). "The Regression Test". In Tidhar, Lavie (ed.). The Best of World SF: Volume 2. Head of Zeus. ISBN 9781803280318.
  - Reprinted: — (14 February 2023). "The Regression Test". Computing and Technology Ethics: Engaging through Science Fiction. By Burton, Emmanuelle; et al. MIT Press. ISBN 9780262048064.
- — (2 March 2017). "Home Is Where My Mother's Heart Is Buried". FIYAH Literary Magazine. No. 2: Spilling Tea.
- — (August 2017). "Nneoma". Space and Time.
- — (March 2018). "The Harmonic Resonance of Ejiro Anaborhi". The Magazine of Fantasy & Science Fiction.
  - Reprinted: — (21 February 2019). "The Harmonic Resonance of Ejiro Anaborhi". Escape Pod (Podcast). No. 668. Hosted by Mur Lafferty. Narrated by Maxine Moore.
- — (7 April 2018). Chattopadhyay, Bodhisattva; Maisey, Hilde (eds.). "Når Vi Drømmer, Er Vi Selv Gud" [When We Dream We Are Our God]. 10 undersøkelser: Alle grenser er midlertidige [10 Investigations: All Borders Are Temporary]. Klassekampen.
  - Reprinted: — (29 May 2019). "When We Dream We Are Our God". Apex Magazine.
- — (1 December 2018). "Drift-Flux". In Hartmann, Ivor W. (ed.). AfroSFv3. Storytime. ISBN 9789198291339.
- — (27 October 2019). "Abeokuta52". Omenana Magazine. No. 14.
  - Reprinted: — (26 September 2023). "Abeokute52". In Shurin, Jared (ed.). The Big Book of Cyberpunk. Vintage Books. ISBN 9780593467237.
- — (17 December 2019). "Tends to Zero". In Gable, Scott; Dombrowski, C. (eds.). Nowhereville: Weird Is Other People. Broken Eye Books. ISBN 9781940372488.
- — (March 2021). "Comments on Your Provisional Patent Application for An Eternal Spirit Core". Clarkesworld Magazine. No. 174.
- — (September 2021). "An Arc of Electric Skin". Asimov's Science Fiction.
  - Reprinted: — (14 April 2022). "An Arc of Electric Skin". Apex Magazine.
  - Reprinted: — (May 2022). "An Arc of Electric Skin". Forever Magazine. No. 88.
  - Reprinted: — (12 December 2023). "An Arc of Electric Skin". In Ekpeki, Oghenechovwe Donald; Bacon, Eugen; Davis, Milton (eds.). The Year's Best African Speculative Fiction (2022). CAEZIK SF & Fantasy. ISBN 9781647100766.
- — (November 2022). "Performance Review". Wordcraft Writers Workshop. Google Research.
- — (15 November 2022). "A Dream of Electric Mothers". In Thomas, Sheree Renée; Knight, Zelda; Ekpeki, Oghenechovwe Donald (eds.). Africa Risen: A New Era of Speculative Fiction. Tordotcom. ISBN 9781250833006.
  - Reprinted: — (22 March 2023). "A Dream of Electric Mothers". Reactor.
  - Reprinted: — (October 2023). "A Dream of Electric Mothers". In Botanova, Kateryna; Kamara, Varri; Latimer, Quinn (eds.). Sahara: A Thousand Paths Into the Future. Sternberg Press; Culturescapes. ISBN 9781915609205.
- — (July 2023). "Blowout". Analog Science Fiction and Fact.
  - Reprinted: — (23 August 2024). "Blowout". In Kaster, Allen (ed.). The Year's Top Tales of Space and Time 4. Infinivox. ISBN 9781884612589.
- — (15 February 2024). "How To Win The G'idiidigbo Challenge: A Practical Guide". In Brozek, Jennifer (ed.). 99 Fleeting Fantasies: A Fantasy Anthology. Pulse Publishing. ISBN 9781950701070.
- — (27 October 2024). Unquiet on the Eastern Front. Subterranean Press. ISBN 9781645242734.
- — (May 2025). "Descent". Clarkesworld Magazine. No. 224.
