= Warrior of the Wind =

2023 fantasy novel by Suyi Davies Okungbowa

- Cover of the 2023 Orbit edition
- Author: Suyi Davies Okungbowa
- Language: English
- Publication date: 2023

Warrior of the Wind is a 2023 fantasy novel written by Nigerian writer Suyi Davies Okungbowa. It is the sequel to Son of the Storm and the second instalment in the Nameless Republic series.

It was nominated for the 2024 Nommo Awards.
