= Tlotlo Tsamaase =

Motswana speculative fiction writer

Tlotlo Pearl Tsamaase
- Occupations: Novelist; short story writer; poet
- Writing career
- Language: English
- Genres: Science fiction; fantasy
- Notable awards: Bessie Head Short Story Award; Nommo Award
- Website: tlotlotsamaase.com

Tlotlo Tsamaase is a Motswana speculative fiction writer and poet.

Her fiction has appeared in Clarkesworld Magazine, Strange Horizons, Africanfuturism: An Anthology, and Africa Risen.

== Life and career ==
Tsamaase earned a bachelor's degree in architecture from the University of Botswana as well as an MFA in creative writing from Chapman University.

Her first novella, The Silence of the Wilting Skin, was published in 2021 by Pink Narcissus Press and was nominated for a Lambda Literary Award for Speculative Fiction.

Her first novel, Womb City, was published by Erewhon Books in 2024 and was nominated for a Locus Award for Best First Novel. It was also a finalist for the 2025 Ignyte Award for Outstanding Novel – Adult.

Her second novel, House of Margins, was published by Erewhon books in 2026.

Her fiction has appeared in publications such as Clarkesworld Magazine, The Best of World Science Fiction Volume 1, Futuri uniti d'Africa, Terraform, Strange Horizons, Africanfuturism: An Anthology, Africa Risen, The Dark Magazine, and The Year's Best African Speculative Fiction.

She is represented by Naomi Davis of BookEnds Literary Agency.

== Awards and nominations ==
Year	Nominated work	Category	Award	Result	Notes	Ref.
2011	Unlettered Skies of the Sublime	Best Novel	Bessie Head Short Story Awards	Won		
2017	I Will Be Your Grave	Best Poem	Rhysling Award	Nominated		
2017	"Virtual Snapshots"		Nommo Award	Nominated	Longlist	
2021	The Silence of the Wilting Skin	LGBTQ Speculative Fiction	Lambda Award	Nominated		
2021	The Silence of the Wilting Skin	Best Novella	Nommo Award	Nominated		
2021	"Behind Our Irises"	Best Short Story	Nommo Award	Won	Joint winner	
2022	"Dreamports"	Best Short Story	Nommo Award	Nominated		
2023	"Peeling Time (Deluxe Edition)"		Caine Prize	Nominated	Shortlist	
2025	Womb City	Best First Novel	Locus Award	Nominated	Top ten finalist	
2025	Womb City	Best Novel	Nommo Award	Won		

== Selected works ==
=== Short stories ===
- "Who Will Clean Our Spirits When We Are Gone?" in The Dark Magazine (2019)
- "Eclipse Our Sins" in Clarkesworld Magazine (2019)
- "The River of Night" in The Dark Magazine (2020)
- "Behind Our Irises" in Africanfuturism: An Anthology edited by Wole Talabi (2020)
- "The River of Night" in The Year's Best African Speculative Fiction edited by Oghenechovwe Donald Ekpeki (2021)
- "Peeling Time (Deluxe Edition)" in Africa Risen edited by Sheree Thomas, Zelda Knight, and Oghenechovwe Donald Ekpeki (2022)
- "Dreamports" in Apex Magazine (2022)

=== Novels and novellas ===
- The Silence of the Wilting Skin (2020)
- Womb City (2024)
- House of Margins (2026)
