= Shigidi and the Brass Head of Obalufon =

2023 novel by Wole Talabi

- Author: Wole Talabi
- Publisher: DAW Books
- Publication date: 8 Aug 2023
- Pages: 320
- ISBN: 9780756418939

Shigidi and the Brass Head of Obalufon is a 2023 novel by Wole Talabi, the author's debut novel. The novel won the 2024 Nommo Award for Best Novel. It was a finalist for the Crawford Award and the World Fantasy Award for Best Novel.

== Plot ==
The novel is told out of chronological order; the first scene in the novel is a flash forward of Shigidi and Nneoma fleeing through spirit-side London. For ease of reading, the plot is summarized here in chronological order.

=== February 1021; Ethiopia ===
Nneoma is a succubus. Her sister Lilith has a lover, Samael, who is in service to Dil Na'od. Gudit seizes power from Dil Na'od. Lilith agrees to fight with Samael out of love; she is killed in the ensuing battle. Nneoma rejects the idea of romantic love, believing it led to her sister's death.

=== November 14, 1909; Algeria ===
Aleister Crowley and his lover Victor Neuberg encounter Nneoma, who is being held captive by a local magician. They free her; she offers them knowledge of demonic summoning through sexual magic. Victor flees, but Crowley follows her into the desert.

=== December 1, 1947; Hastings, England ===
Nneoma visits an elderly Crowley. She gives him spirit particles from young men she has killed in exchange for a future favor. This greatly extends his lifespan.

=== October 31, 2016; spirit world ===
Shigidi is a nightmare god in the employ of the Orisha Spirit Company. His company is in decline due to the lack of human believers. Furthermore, as a minor deity, Shigidi is underpaid and overworked. A jealous husband prays for Shigidi to kill his adulterous wife. Shigidi arrives to kill the woman, but finds that her affair partner is Nneoma. The two fight over their competing claims to the woman's spirit. In exchange for the woman's spirit, Nneoma offers to have sex with Shigidi, breaking his connection to the spirit company. He accepts.

=== November 20, 2016; Lagos, Nigeria ===
Shigidi and Nneoma are attacked by Oba, Oya, and Ososhi (a hunter orisha) as revenge for breaking his contract with the company. Shigidi almost kills Oba before her husband Shango, CEO of the Orisha Spirit Company, appears. Shigidi steals Shango's hand but almost dies in the fight. He prays to Olorun, chairman of the board and former CEO, for help. Nneoma makes a deal with Olorun to secure their safety.

=== July 1, 2017; spirit world ===
Olorun attends a meeting of the spirit company's board. He proposes changing business strategies to counteract growing secularism in their territory. Olorun blames Shango's policies and judges him to be a corrupt bureaucrat. Olorun moves for a vote of no confidence in Shango, which succeeds when Olorun casts the tie-breaking vote. The two orishas battle in the conference room. Olorun eventually proves victorious and takes control as the CEO.

=== July 4–5, 2017; London, UK ===
Olorun calls in the debt owed by Shigidi and Nneoma. They are instructed to break into the British Museum and steal a brass head, which contains some of Olorun's powers. The museum is protected by British spiritual guards and will require an escape route through both the physical and spiritual sides of reality. Olorun insists that the heist happen on the same night.

Nneoma recruits Aleister Crowley to assist with the heist. Early on the morning of July 5, they reach the Temple of the Golden Dawn. They steal a tome that grants them access to the spirit side of London. They must be back from the spirit-side by sunrise, or the tome will return to the physical world without them.

Aleister moves to spirit-side London. In the physical realm, Nneoma and Shigidi infiltrate the British Museum. They retrieve the brass head of Obalufon. They are then attacked by demons Gog and Magog, part of the British defense system. Shigidi kills Magog but loses his arm in the process. They escape to the spirit side of London with assistance from Aleister.

Shigidi, Nneoma, and Aleister are pursued by Gog. Nneoma confesses her love to a wounded Shigidi, despite her previous rejection of love after Lilith's death. Gog crashes his chariot into Aleister's car. Shigidi is impaled by the brass head; he uses its powers to kill Gog. Shigidi, Nneoma, and Aleister return to the physical world just before dawn breaks.

Olorun is furious that the brass headdress has been broken. It contained all of his war powers, some of which have been transferred to Shigidi. Olorun requires his war aspect in order to continue his business strategy against Shango. Olorun begins extracting the war essence. Shigidi's love for Nneoma allows him to hold onto his personal identity and survive the extraction. Olorun leaves a tiny iota of war essence inside Shigidi, with plans for a future partnership.

== Major themes ==
Archita Mittra of Strange Horizons wrote of the novel's themes of anti-capitalism and anti-imperialism. When he is first introduced, Shigidi is a minor god whose work is not valued: "the lion’s share of the profits that accrue from his work are enjoyed by his boss Shango—and Shango’s wives." Despite Shigidi's supernatural powers, he is still "chained to an exploitative system without any hopes or ambitions for the future." Mittra notes that Nneoma's pitch to Shigidi offers "a way to resist capitalism, particularly the corporatized ownership of one’s time and autonomy that a strict 9-to-5 occupation typically involves." The novel also portrays the difficulties of a freelance career, including lack of job security.

Mittra also critiqued the way that femininity and sexuality are portrayed in the story. In Mittra's view, the "femme fatale trope is sometimes subverted here, [but] the way she weaponizes her nubile looks to control gods and men by sexual coercion—while also being vulnerable enough to settle for Shigidi—seems to me a product of a male power fantasy." The same review further critiques the novel's treatment of beauty standards, writing that Shigidi's physical transformation "sits a little uneasily with me, as such cosmetic procedures seem to uphold the very patriarchal beauty standards that affect all genders, and in which certain bodies (particularly disabled ones) are perceived as being undesirable."

== Reception and awards ==
Publishers Weekly gave the novel a starred review, noting that "Talabi's freshness is in his language, his caustically amusing protagonist ... and his commitment to having more fun than noir usually allows. Readers are in for a rollicking thrill ride."

Writing for Lightspeed, Chris Kluwe called the novel "a rollicking heist/love story that has much more going on beneath its surface than you might expect." Kluwe notes that the novel explores themes of capitalism and colonialism, stating that "Talabi pulls no punches when addressing how these two forces impact those not lucky enough to be on the benefitting side." Kluwe also notes that while Shigidi is the title character, "the book is just as much Nneoma’s story as it is his. Talabi does masterful work weaving in gender expectations with subversions of the same in order to highlight issues of female bodily autonomy and social perceptions of women who dare desire sexuality the way men do." Also writing for Lightspeed, Aigner Loren Wilson praised the incorporation of Nigerian mythology, spiritualism, and folklore into the story. Wilson praised the novel's method of telling the story out of chronological order, stating that "some people might be thrown off by the story starting at the end and going back to the beginning, but to me, the structure of the story nailed the heist genre so well that it heightened everything." Wilson concluded that "the book’s themes of revenge, self-discovery, and the power of belief are thought-provoking and timely." Archita Mittra of Strange Horizons critiqued the novel's portrayal of beauty standards and sexuality, while concluding that the novel "is a memorable one that operates on many levels—a heist thriller, an action-adventure tale, an erotic romance, an examination of the colonial fallout and its insidious transformation to multinational capitalism, and a story of self-improvement and fulfilling one’s true potential."

Reviewers Kluwe, Mittra, and Gary K. Wolfe of Locus noted that the book will draw comparisons to American Gods by Neil Gaiman. Wolfe notes that Talabi is part of "an impressive and growing number of international authors [who] have been exploring the problems faced by gods from a range of cultures." Wolfe compares the novel's Orisha Spirit Company to both a multinational corporation and "a hopeless government bureaucracy". The review also praised the fast pace as well as the relationship between Shigidi and Nneoma. Wolfe concludes his review by stating that "Talabi keeps in balance his kinetic mix of noir heist fiction, erotic romance, political intrigue, and supernatural fireworks without distracting too much from the genuinely affecting relationship between Nneoma and Shigidi, who are a pair we wouldn’t mind seeing again, and won’t forget anytime soon."

Katherine Sleyko of Library Journal noted that the novel is "partly about a heist, but the theft is secondary to the long histories of the gods and their religious companies." Sleyko felt that "the story sometimes feels like a series of character studies interrupted by an ongoing crime." She concluded her review by calling the novel "interesting new godpunk with some rough edges."

Year	Award	Category	Result	Ref.
2023	BSFA Award	Novel	Shortlisted	
2023	Nebula Award	Novel	Nominated	
2024	British Fantasy Award	Fantasy Novel	Shortlisted	
2024	Crawford Award	—	Honorable Mention	
2024	Ignyte Award	Adult Novel	Finalist	
2024	Locus Award	First Novel	Finalist	
2024	Nommo Award	Novel	Won	
2024	World Fantasy Award	Novel	Finalist	
2025	Aldiss Award	—	Shortlisted	
