= The Silence of the Wilting Skin =

2020 speculative fiction novella by Tlotlo Tsamaase

- Author: Tlotlo Tsamaase
- Language: English
- Genre: Speculative fiction
- Publisher: Pink Narcissus Press
- Publication date: 2020
- Publication place: United States
- Awards: Finalist for Lambda Literary Award for Speculative Fiction
- ISBN: 978-1-939056-17-7

The Silence of the Wilting Skin is a 2020 speculative fiction novella by Tlotlo Tsamaase, published by Pink Narcissus Press. It was a finalist for the 2021 Lambda Literary Award for Speculative Fiction and a 2021 Nommo Award finalist for Best Novella. It was named one of the best speculative fiction books of 2020 by Silvia Moreno-Garcia and Lavie Tidhar for The Washington Post.

== Synopsis ==
The story is set in an unnamed African city, divided into two racially segregated districts by a train line that carries the spirits of the Black community's dead, including the former boyfriend and some family members of the protagonist. She is an artist, as is her current girlfriend, and both use their art and their relationship to fight off increasing loss of identity, including some people turning invisible or the color coming off others' skin. They are also threatened by the gentrification and co-opting of their city and culture by the white government in the other district, which also threatens to destroy the train line carrying their ancestors. The protagonist turns to insomnia in order to fight against these problems.

== Style and themes ==
The novella is written in a poetic, dreamlike style. It discusses racism, queer identity, colonialism, and erasure of culture. Characters are not given names; instead they are referred to by descriptors, such as "Girlfriend" or "Grandmother."

A reviewer from Strange Horizons writes that "each chapter [is] an impressionistic thought-experiment exploring different facets of the world that Tsamaase’s characters occupy—but they provide sufficient thematic synchronicity to bring each concept into a kind of agreement with the others. The novella invokes ghostly trainlines, but it also entertains the idea of drinking the love of past lovers to keep one’s own love alive, and cultures where the living struggle to stay afloat because they also have to pay dues for the dead. It invokes shadow-less people and people-less shadows, the abrupt loss of skin-colour, sight, and opacity as normalized rites of passage for a dying people."

== Reception ==
The Silence of the Wilting Skin was a finalist for the 2021 Lambda Literary Award for Speculative Fiction. It was also a 2021 Nommo Award finalist for Best Novella. It was named one of the best science fiction, fantasy, or horror books of 2020 by The Washington Post, in a list compiled by prominent speculative fiction writers Silvia Moreno-Garcia and Lavie Tidhar, who described it as an "impressive and memorable debut."

Publishers Weekly writes that The Silence of the Wilting Skin is "lyrical and incisive . . . this atmospheric anticolonialist battle cry is a tour de force."

Strange Horizons writes that "[Tsamaase's] prose, like her poetry, prioritizes recurring images, terms, and themes over character, setting, and plot consistency . . . The Silence of the Wilted Skin [cannot] be considered an 'easy' read, even when engaged without expectations of consistency along the usual lines of character and plot. This novella is, however, a read that will get under your—ah—skin."
