= Bessie Head Short Story Awards =

Botswana literary award

Bessie Head Short Story Awards (Bessie Head Literature Awards from 2007 to 2013) is a Botswana literary award founded in 2007. It is administered by the Bessie Head Heritage Trust. The Trust was established in June 2007 to promote the life and work of Bessie Head. The goal of the award is to help preserve Bessie Head's legacy in Botswana, and to encourage the development of Botswana literature in various genres in English.

From 2007 to 2013 the awards were given for best novel, short story, poetry and children's story. The poetry and children's story awards were bi-annual, the novel and short story awards are annual.

Beginning in 2015, the award focused changed to a short-story award.

== History ==
In 2012, it was announced there would be no awards for the year. Reasons given include the withdraw of the financial sponsor Pentagon Publishers; and a lack of organization to handle the large number of submissions. They announced "We intend to resume the Literature Awards as soon as this is possible, hopefully in 2013."

== Winners ==
2007

- Novel: Khonani Ontebetse for Born with a Husband
- Short Story: Bontekanye Botumile for "Which Doctor"
- Poetry: Monty Fanikiso Moswela for "Meeting in Francistown"

2008

- Novel: Phidson Mojokeri for Curse of a Dream
- Short Story: Lauri Kubuitsile for "Solar Heater"
- Poetry: Ita Mannathoko for "Kgalagadi, the Great Thirst"

2009

- Novel: Cheryl Selase Ntumy for Crossing
- Short Story: Gothataone Moeng for "Putting On Faces"
- Poetry: Luda Sekga for "He Was My Oppressor"

2010

- Novel: Tshetsana Senau for Travelling To The Sun: The Diary Of Ruth
- Short Story: Legodile Seganabeng for "The Moon Has Eyes"
- Children's Story: Jenny Robson for "The Right Time"

2011

- Novel: Tlotlo Pearl Tsamaase for Unlettered Skies of the Sublime
- Short Story: Boikhutso Robert for "The Zambezi Crocodiles"
- Poetry: John Hutcheson for "The Massacre of Innocents", "The Man", "Curse"

2012

- No awards

2013

- Novel: Veronica Jane McLean for The Hot Chain
- Short Story: Moreetsi Pius Gabang for "Lesilo mo Maun"
- Children's Story: Margaret Baffour-Awuah for "Two Frogs Go A'Wandering"

2014

- No award

2015

- First: Donald Molosi for the story "The Biggest Continent"
- Second: Siyanda Mohutsiwa, for "And Then We Disappeared into Some Guy's Car"
- Third: Vamika Sinha, for "Love and Other Almosts"

2016

- Caiphus Mmino Mangenela for the story "A Mother Amongst the Stars"
