= Our Lady of Mysterious Ailments =

2022 novel by T. L. Huchu

Our Lady Of Mysterious Ailment
- First edition
- Author: T. L. Huchu
- Language: English
- Series: Edinburgh Night
- Release number: 2
- Genre: Fantasy
- Set in: Scotland
- Publisher: Tor Books
- Publication date: 3 March 2022
- Publication place: Scotland
- Media type: Print (hardback)
- Pages: 384
- ISBN: 978-1-250-76779-0
- Preceded by: The Library of the Dead

Our Lady of Mysterious Ailments is a dystopian futuristic fantasy novel by Zimbabwean author T. L. Huchu. The first edition was published in 2022 by Tor Books. It is Huchu's fourth novel and the second instalment in the Edinburgh Nights series which is set in Scotland.
