= Mazi Nwonwu =

Nigerian author and journalist

- Born: Chiagozie Fred Nwonwu; Nkwe, Enugu, Nigeria
- Citizenship: Nigeria
- Education: Government College, Kaduna
- Alma mater: Nnamdi Azikiwe University
- Occupations: Writer, journalist
- Writing career
- Pen name: Mazi Nwonwu
- Language: English, Igbo
- Genres: Science fiction, fantasy

Chiagozie Fred Nwonwu who writes under the pen name Mazi Nwonwu is a Nigerian writer, curator and editor. He is the co-founder and managing editor of Omenana Magazine. In 2017, he was listed as one of the most powerful people in the media space alongside Stephanie Busari and Fisayo Soyombo by YNaija.

== Early life and career ==
Nwonwu was born in Nkwe, a village in Enugu, Enugu State. He attended the Government College, Kaduna (now Barewa College) then moved on to Nnamdi Azikiwe University to study Linguistics. He has worked as the managing editor at Olisa.tv. He co-founded Omenana Magazine in 2014 with Chinelo Onwualu. He is also a journalist at BBC. BBC described him as one of the authors writing a new Nigeria. He is considered to be among the Third Generation of Nigerian Writers.

In 2026, he was again named by YNaija as one of the 100 most impactful people in Nigerian media.

== Bibliography ==
- How to Make a Space Masquerade (Narrative Landscape Press, 2024)
- Africanfuturism: An Anthology (Brittlepaper, 2020)
- AfroSF: Science Fiction by African Writers (StoryTime, 2013)
