= The Maestro, The Magistrate & The Mathematician =

2014 novel by Tendai Huchu

- First edition
- Author: Tendai Huchu
- Language: English
- Genre: Literary fiction
- Publisher: Amabooks Publishers
- Publication date: 1 December 2014
- Publication place: Zimbabwe
- Media type: Print (Paperback)
- Pages: 284 pp
- ISBN: 9780797495005

The Maestro, The Magistrate & The Mathematician is a novel written by Zimbabwean writer Tendai Huchu. Huchu's second novel, it was published in 2014 by Amabooks Publishers and republished by Parthian Books in 2015.
