= Womb City =

2024 science fiction novel

- First edition cover
- Author: Tlotlo Tsamaase
- Language: English
- Publisher: Kensington Publishing Corp.
- Publication date: 2024
- ISBN: 978-1-64566-056-9 (first edition, hardcover)

Womb City is a 2024 science fiction novel by Motswana writer Tlotlo Tsamaase.

== Themes and analysis ==
Zoe L. Tongue of the University of Leeds has described the novel as an "Afrofuturist narrative exploring AI and bodily autonomy," in particular "the use of AI for patriarchal manipulation." Ian Mond of Locus Magazine described the novel's "driving theme" as "how society, even so-called utopias, seek to disempower women and remove their bodily autonomy, to the degree they will fight amongst themselves for the few scraps of power that remain." Nedine Moonsamy of the University of Johannesburg has written that, in the novel, "beneath the surface of technological change and systemic order, the country is riddled with corruption that is primarily driven by money and a masculine entitlement to women’s bodies. The scale of evil manipulation is so large that the status quo must be brought to its knees by those brave enough to challenge it," comparing to the 2014 novel Lagoon by Nnedi Okorafor and the 2009 film Pumzi by Wanuri Kahiu.

Jenna N. Hanchey of Arizona State University has written that the novel "demonstrates how misogyny’s fear of the feminine is connected to the possibility that the feminine can move," saying that "the feminine in Womb City is tightly controlled. It must be, in order for the men in power to avoid its touch, driven as they are by fear: '[S]haring power means loss of power to them, a form of weakness—if we give them space, where will we sit? What will we do? Who are we, then?' Their staggering anxiety incites staggering violences to avoid facing that final question: who are we, if the feminine may touch us, even us?" Hanchey also noted that the novel was "deeply situated within Botswanan culture... In the Botswanan context of Womb City, body-hopping stems from the pools of Matsieng, an ancient deity. Matsieng is similar to Nelah in being both feminine and gender-expansive: Matsieng uses Xe/Xer/Xem pronouns (much like the novel’s author) but is also narrated in feminine ways, as when Nelah reflects on Xer being buried for millennia: 'Why must women—even powerful ones—always live out our existences buried?'" Sinclair Adams of Strange Horizons has written that the novel "shows how inequality is propagated by long-standing systems, rather than just a network of a few corrupt individuals" and that Tsamaase's writing touches on themes of "identity, bodily autonomy, romantic and familial relationships, Afrofuturism, and even criminology," while also noting that "The Botswana setting, too, is central to the novel’s message and success. Matsieng, the name of a deity and a location in Womb City, is also a real historical site in Botswana that contains over a hundred petroglyphs that are thousands of years old. It is believed to be the birthplace of humankind."

In an interview with Gizmodo, Tsamaase stated that "the plot of Womb City comes from wondering what the future might hold by extrapolating our current reality’s issues into an advanced world, examining it through the lenses of gender identity, crime, toxic elements of culture, etc... when it comes to women’s bodies it’s always a display of power to own them in one way or another—and a corrupt motivation to restrict their autonomy, whether through culture or politics—which to me always feels very violent. The power of technology can be used for good—it brings convenience to our lives, allows people from different parts of the world to interact, etc.— so I think technology and the human body can both be in competition and in conversation with each other." In the same interview, Tsamaase stated that "I’ve never seen representation of my home country in English language SFF... I have vivid memories of visiting the Matsieng Footprints, a cultural site just located outside Botswana’s capital city, Gaborone. The Matsieng Footprints was a fitting place for a big reveal of a generations-long dark secret that the protagonist encounters in the book, since Matsieng deals with folklore and creation of people. It’s also surrounded by watering holes, which play a pivotal role in Womb City."

== Critical reception ==
Writing for Lightspeed Magazine, Aigner Loren Wilson wrote that the novel "balances a science fiction dystopian world with both a ghost story and a dark comedy of errors, and does so in a way that doesn’t confuse the reader," calling it an "introspective Africanfuturist horror for readers who love stories that take a swing at reductive views on gender and crime without hiding the awfulness those issues bring up." Kirkus Reviews reviewed the novel saying that "the twists and turns are compelling, and the setting of future Botswana is intriguing yet grounded in reality, especially regarding global inequalities... Simplicity in theme is balanced by worldbuilding that seamlessly combines problematic technology with Motswana legend."

Ian Mond of Locus Magazine wrote that "I found the first third of Womb City hard going," but that "I inhaled the second half of the novel," saying that "the reveals come thick and fast" and describing the prose as "incandescent, furious." Sinclair Adams of Strange Horizons described the novel as a "masterful story of science-fiction splendor and horror... Expertly toeing the line between didacticism and commentary, Tsamaase’s is a narratively innovative novel that sets a new standard for the genre," while also noting that "Certainly the first fourth of the book might even be a bit slow, as we engage with a lot of worldbuilding, but the descriptions of this world are cutting-edge." Writing in The New York Times, Gabino Iglesias wrote that there were "a few instances of clunky writing and repetition," but that "The author seamlessly blends a body-hopping ghost story about revenge with a narrative about the importance of memory. It’s such an original first novel, and I’ll be reading whatever comes next."

Womb City won the 2025 Nommo Award for Best Novel.
