= Convergence Problems =

2024 short-story collection by Wole Talabi

- Author: Wole Talabi
- Audio read by: Ben Arogundade
- Cover artist: Jim Tierney
- Language: English
- Genre: Science fiction
- Publisher: DAW Books
- Publication date: 13 Feb 2024
- Pages: 320 (Hardcover)
- ISBN: 9780756418830

Convergence Problems is a 2024 short-story collection by Wole Talabi. It contains sixteen stories, some of which are original to the collection. Convergence Problems was shortlisted for the 2024 BSFA Award for Best Collection and was a finalist for the 2025 Locus Award for Best Collection. The stories combine hard science fiction with mythology and traditional spiritual practices, and are considered examples of Afrofuturism.

== Contents ==
- Introduction: On Convergence Problems
- "Debut"
- "An Arc of Electric Skin"
- "Saturday's Song"
- "Lights in the Sky"
- "Blowout"
- "Gamma (or: Love in the Age of Radiation Poisoning)"
- "Ganger"
- "Abeokuta52"
- "Tends to Zero"
- "Nigerian Dreams"
- "Performance Review"
- "Silence"
- "Embers"
- "The Million Eyes of a Lonely and Fragile God"
- "Comments on Your Provisional Patent Application for an Eternal Spirit Core"
- "A Dream of Electric Mothers"

== Major themes ==
Aran Ward Sell stated that a recurring theme among Talabi's stories was parental loss, particularly the death of a mother figure. In the stories, siblings grieving the loss of their mother often experience miscommunications. Sell noted that many stories explore the "incomprehensibility of living in a world in which your mother is dead".

Sell also noted that many stories feature Nigerian middle class protagonists, including engineers, physicians, and scientists. Specifically, these characters are often university graduates. For example, the protagonist of "Embers" studies fossil fuels, but his professional life is disrupted by the discovery of a new energy source.

== Background and publication history ==
In an interview with Arley Sorg of Clarkesworld Magazine, Talabi stated that he selected the stories in Convergence Problems to fit the title. According to the author, the included stories "explore the difficulties and challenges around technological or supernatural variations of the world."

Three stories are original to the collection; the other thirteen had been previously published. Several stories were revised prior to publication. The story "Embers" was originally published as a 2,000 word short story; the version in Convergence Problems has been expanded to more than 9,000 words. "Lights In The Sky" and "Gamma, Or, Love in the Age of Radiation Poisoning" have also been revised for this collection.

The story "Performance Review" was written with the assistance of generative AI. Talabi participated in a workshop run by Google and utilized Google Wordcraft to create the story. Talabi stated that he participated in order to give Google feedback which would empower other writers.

== Reception and awards ==
Eric Smith of the Chicago Review of Books gave the collection 5 stars, stating that its stories combine "new and old ideas, thoughts, and concepts". Talabi incorporates hard science fiction, mythology, and traditional spiritual practices into various stories. Smith wrote that all of the stories serve as examples of Afrofuturism.

Kirkus Reviews called the collection "fascinating and riveting," noting that the stories are accessible "even to those with no background in Nigeria or Africanfuturism." The review noted that Talabi centers traditionally marginalized perspectives, including women and LGBTQ characters.

Gary K. Wolfe reviewed the collection for Locus, stating that Talabi links "his SF ideas to Nigerian traditions and culture." Wolfe commented on "Nigerian Dreams", which is largely a discussion between two characters. He compared the setting to The World Inside by Robert Silverberg, noting that both stories are set in a large megastructure; Talabi gives the idea a "uniquely Nigerian angle." Wolfe noted that the collection generally explores Talabi's science fiction ideas, but that he is equally at home in a wide variety of genres, as evidenced by the fantasy elements in "Saturday's Song".

Bill Capossere of fantasyliterature.com gave the collection 3.5 out of 5 stars. The review felt that the stories were generally consistent in quality, noting that "Saturday's Song" was a standout story. Capossere praised the Nigerian settings and the inclusion of Yoruba folklore, but noted that Talabi's science fiction stories sometimes felt overly technical.

Writing for Strange Horizons, Aran Ward Sell criticized the prose and noted that many stories seem like they "have their eyes set on screen adaptation rather than on the unique potentials of language and literature". Sell felt that "Saturday's Song" was a weak entry, criticizing it for lack of depth and syrupy-sweet prose. Sell felt that the best stories in the collection were "Gamma" and "Ganger", noting that Talabi is best when writing pure science fiction. The review criticized the ordering of stories within the collection, noting that it frontloaded the weaker entries. The reviewer concluded that Convergence Problems is an inconsistent book, but that Talabi's newest stories were his best and that he is improving as a writer.

Alexis Ong of Reactor stated that the collection "does a superb job at giving fresh life to familiar science fiction concepts" but was an uneven reading experience. Ong commented on the novella "Ganger", praising its black humor and complex tone. At the same time, the reviewer felt that the pace was "bogged down in over-exposition". Ong criticized the use of generative AI to write "Performance Review", stating that "you would think that someone who so capably crafts tech dystopias and ecologically ruined hellscapes would recognize the many problems of using AI for shits and giggles..."

Convergence Problems was shortlisted for the 2024 BSFA Award for Best Collection and was a finalist for the 2025 Locus Award for Best Collection.
