= Foreign Gods, Inc. =

2014 novel by Okey Ndibe

- Author: Okey Ndibe
- Language: English
- Genre: Fiction
- Publisher: Soho Press
- Publication date: 7 October 2014
- Publication place: Nigeria
- Media type: Print (Paperback)
- Pages: 357
- ISBN: 9781616954581
- Preceded by: Arrows of Rain

Foreign Gods, Inc. is a 2014 novel written by Nigerian author Okey Ndibe.

== Plot ==
Foreign Gods, Inc. is about Ike, a Nigerian who faced some difficulty after traveling to New York and working as a taxi driver. He comes back to steal the statue of an ancient war deity from his home village and sell it to a New York business man for money.
