= The Library of the Dead =

2021 novel by Tendai Huchu

- First edition
- Author: T. L. Huchu
- Language: English
- Series: Edinburgh Nights
- Genre: Fantasy fiction
- Published: 2021
- Publisher: Tor Books
- Pages: 330
- Awards: Alex Award; Nommo Award for Best Novel
- ISBN: 9781250767769
- Followed by: Our Lady of Mysterious Ailments

The Library of the Dead is a novel written by T. L. Huchu. It is his third novel and the first volume in the Edinburgh Nights series. It was first published by Tor Books in 2021. The novel is set in a dystopian Edinburgh.

== Plot ==
Fourteen-year-old Ropa performs an exorcism for a wealthy family. On the way home, she is robbed by police officers.

A ghost named Nicola Stuart asks Ropa to help find her missing son, Oliver. Oliver disappeared while playing with his friend Mark. Ropa declines on the grounds that Nicola has no living relatives who can pay for the services. Ropa lives in a community of squatters, along with her grandmother and her younger sister Izwi. Gran convinces Ropa to help Nicola, even without pay.

Ropa sneaks into Mark's house, learning that he has been afflicted with a terrible curse. His body remains young, but his head appears to be that of an old man.

Ropa's friend Jomo sneaks her into the Library of the Dead, which may contain information about Mark's condition. The Library is a sacred space for practitioners of magic. Although Ropa is a ghost talker, members of her profession are not allowed. They are caught by Jomo's father, Dr. Maige. Dr. Maige arrests Ropa and informs her that the penalty for trespassing is death.

A magician named Sir Callendar intervenes. He senses that Ropa can practice chivanhu, a type of folk magic passed down from Ropa's grandmother. Therefore, she is allowed on Library grounds. A library employee gives Ropa a book and a severed ear before dismissing her.

She returns to the Library, where Callander declines to help with Ollie's case. He does, however, give Ropa an unusual scarf. Ropa meets Siobhan Kavanagh, a television star with an unnaturally youthful appearance and a national audience. Ropa then meets healer Priya Kapoor, who agrees to help. Priya and Ropa visit Red Rob, the leader of a criminal enterprise. Rob is caring for a young girl named Katie who has been afflicted with the aging spell.

Ropa goes to Arthur Lodge, the mansion where Katie was afflicted by the curse. Ropa sees a vision of her mother, who has been missing for years. She runs inside, where she immediately falls into the basement and injures herself. She is rescued by a butler, Wilson, but she finds that has been cursed so she cannot leave the house. Ropa is forced into servitude. She meets Grace, another imprisoned girl. Wilson teaches her to complete various chores. Grace is taken by a man called the Midnight Milkman.

Wilson tells Ropa about the Brounie, the spirit of the house which gives it power. Ropa enters the spirit plane to confront the Brounie. The Brounie is eaten by spirits, but Ropa escapes. Back in the physical world, Ropa escapes from the collapsing house.

Ropa and Priya attempt to track down the Milkman through Priya's contacts with local drug dealers. They are ambushed by a milk truck, which attempts to run them down. The Milkman emerges to attack them. Ropa’s scarf grabs the Milkman, who is killed in the ensuing confrontation. Ropa drops Priya at a hospital and continues her search for the children.

Ropa and Jomo follow a lead to an abandoned farm. Inside a barn, she finds several cursed children, including Oliver. She learns that Siobhan is the villain: she has been using the children’s life force to fuel her own youth and fame. They engage in a magical duel. Ropa pushes Siobhan out of a window. As she dies, Siobhan's appearance changes to that of an elderly woman.

Ropa brings Ollie to see the ghost of his mother. Nicola says farewell before moving on.

== Reception and awards ==
Writing for The Scotsman, Stuart Kelly wrote that the book combines the subgenera of "urban supernatural fantasy and apocalyptic dystopia". Kelly praised the novel for its portrayal of a dystopian Edinburgh, noting that it uses fantastic storytelling elements to critique inequality and social disparities.

Richard Marcus of the Seattle Post-Intelligencer praised the novel's originality in the crowded young adult dystopian literary genre. Marcus praised the way in which the protagonist incorporated elements of her Zimbabwean heritage into the practice of magic, as well as her distinctive voice.

The novel won a 2022 Alex Award and the 2022 Nommo Award for Best Novel.
