= Suyi Davies Okungbowa =

Nigerian author

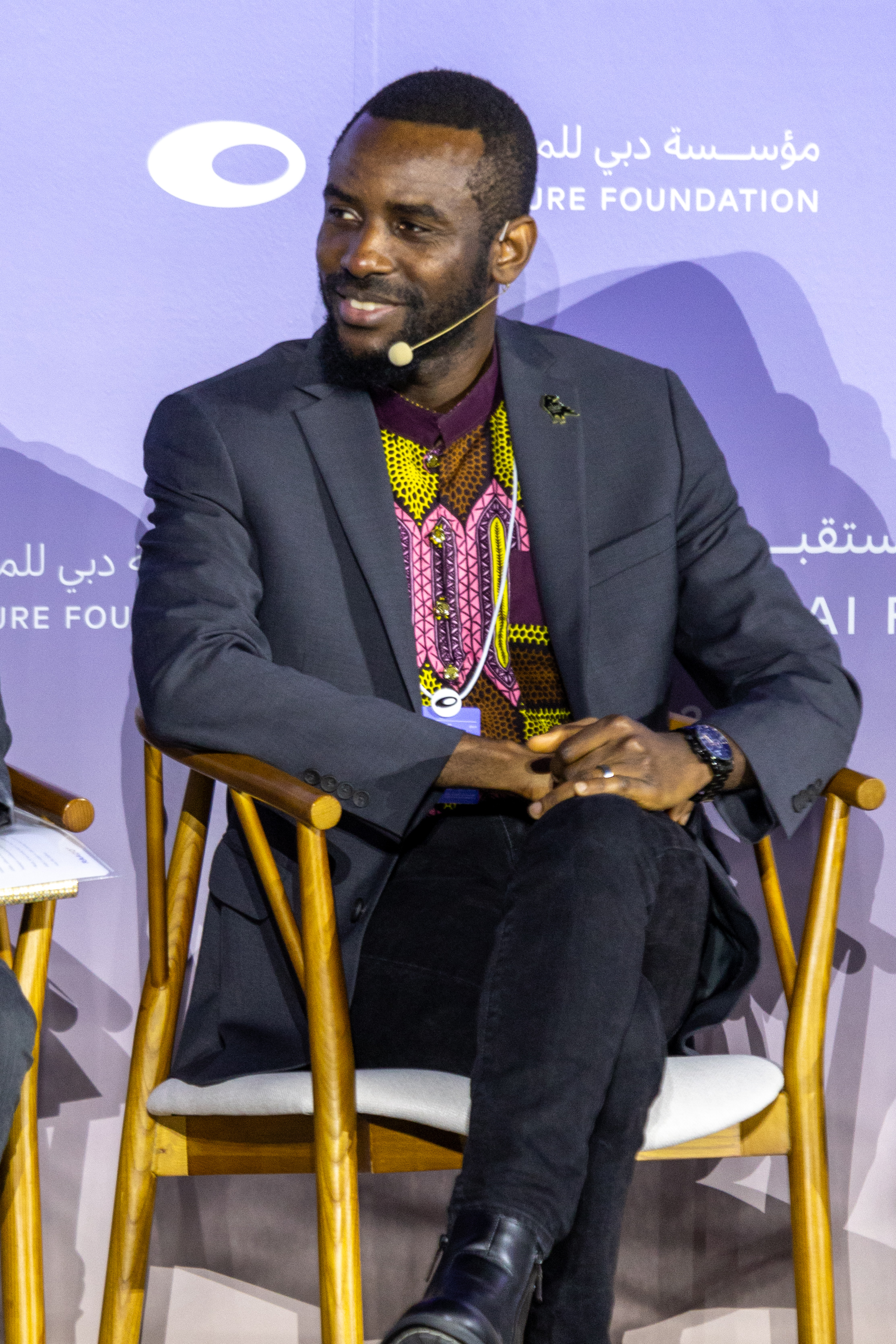
- Okungbowa at the Dubai Future Forum (2024)
- Born: Osasuyi Okungbowa; 1989 (age 36–37); Benin City, Nigeria
- Education: University of Benin; University of Arizona
- Occupations: Author & Scholar
- Years active: 2015-present
- Known for: African speculative fiction
- Notable work: Son of the Storm; David Mogo, Godhunter; Black Panther: Tales of Wakanda; Stranger Things: Lucas on the Line
- Awards: Nommo Award nominee; Ignyte Award; Nommo Award 2x winner
- Website: suyidavies.com

Suyi Davies Okungbowa (born Osasuyi Okungbowa in Benin City, Nigeria) is an author and professor of Creative Writing at the University of Ottawa. His debut novel, David Mogo, Godhunter was published in July 2019; he has also written for younger readers (under the author name Suyi Davies) like Minecraft: The Haven Trials. His work is heavily influenced by the histories and cultures of West Africa and Nigeria, and discusses themes of identity, challenging difference and finding home. WIRED referred to him as "one of the most promising new voices coterie of African SFF writers."

== Early life ==
Okungbowa was born and raised in Benin City, Edo State in the southern part of Nigeria. His early life orbited the University of Benin, after which he went on to obtain a bachelor's in civil engineering from the same university between 2006 and 2011. He later moved to Lagos, then went on to study at the University of Arizona in Tucson for an MFA in creative writing.

== Personal life ==
Okungbowa currently lives and works in Ottawa, Canada. Prior to that, he spent time in the US, the UK and in various cities in Nigeria. He has also worked in various fields, from engineering to professional services to marketing communications to digital learning. He is currently an assistant professor of creative writing at the University of Ottawa in Ontario.

== Career ==
Okungbowa's debut novel, David Mogo, Godhunter was released by Abaddon imprint of Rebellion Publishing on July 9, 2019 in the US and two days later in the UK and Europe. The novel follows the titular demigod, who is also a god hunter, as he scours the streets of Okungbowa's native Lagos, Nigeria, in the aftermath of an event called The Falling where thousands of orishas have fallen to the city.

The novel received good reception, with venues like WIRED commenting that, "a number of books have been termed 'godpunk,' but Suyi Davies Okungbowa's novel may be the subgenre's platonic deific ideal," while Publishers Weekly mentioned that "this story is captivating, and readers who enjoy non-Western fantasy, mythpunk, and tales of found family will find it delightful." However, there were critical mentions of the story structure, which was a novel in three parts, almost akin to a collection of novellas (F(r)iction's Giancarlo Riccobon called it "three books for the price of one") and the treatment of some of the minor characters. But overall, the consensus was that the authorial voice was fresh and welcome, especially in a white-dominated sub-genre.

"American urban fantasy, like any established genre, can get predictable," L.E.H Light of BlackNerdProblems said in a lengthy, favourable review. "David Mogo, Godhunter is anything but."

In October 2020, David Mogo, Godhunter was announced as the winner of the 2020 Nommo Award for Best Speculative Novel by an African (the Ilube Award).

The first book in the trilogy, Son of the Storm, was released in May 2021, to mostly positive acclaim. NPR Books said of it: "Okungbowa's control of power, relationships, plot twists, and politics throughout gets high marks." Library Journal, which gave the novel a starred review, highly recommended it for "fans of epic fantasy based on non-European mythologies...readers who enjoy protagonists on troubled journeys...or anyone who likes to chew on stories with complex shenanigans." Tor.com's Alex Brown said it was "epic fantasy that breaks the rules," praising Okungbowa's worldbuilding and attention to detail. Publishers Weekly called it a "series starter [that] promises more good things to come." The second novel in the trilogy was published November 2023. It has so far received rave reviews, including a starred review from Kirkus, who called it "broad and imaginative in scope."

Okungbowa's first novella, Lost Ark Dreaming, was published in 2024. Okungbowa described the science fiction novella as "my attempt to examine the pathways to healing and restoration of land and people, embracing both advanced technologies and indigenous practices." It won the 2025 Ignyte Award and the Nommo Award both for Best Novella, and was nominated for various other awards, including a Nebula Award, all under the "Best Novella" category.

== Other works ==
Okungbowa also writes for young audiences under the author name Suyi Davies, disclosing that he "decided to separate my works for younger audiences from my work for adult audiences in this way." His first full-length work for younger audiences is the middle-grade novel, Minecraft: The Haven Trials. Prior to this, he published shorter works in collections like Black Boy Joy.

As an academic, Okungbowa has also published various papers and essays of a scholarly nature.

== Partial bibliography ==
=== Novels & Novellas ===
- David Mogo, Godhunter, 2019 (winner of the 2020 Nommo Award for Best Novel)
- Minecraft: The Haven Trials, 2021
- Stranger Things: Lucas on the Line, 2022
- Lost Ark Dreaming, 2024 (winner of the 2025 Ignyte Award for Outstanding Novella and the 2025 Nommo Award in the same category; finalist for the 2025 Nebula Award for Best Novella).
- Black Panther: The Intergalactic Empire of Wakanda, 2025
- The Nameless Republic series
  - Son of the Storm (The Nameless Republic #1), 2021
  - Warrior of the Wind (The Nameless Republic #2), 2023
  - Season of the Serpent (The Nameless Republic #3), 2026

=== Selected short work ===
- “Lady Koi-Koi: A Book Report,” Apex Magazine, June 2023
- “Exposition Tax: The hidden burden of writing from the margins,” Ex Marginalia: Essays from the edge of speculative fiction (ed. Chinelo Onwualu, February 2023)
- “Choke,” Tor.com, September 2022
- "The Case of the Moaning Marquee," in Travel Anthology to the Most (Fictional) Haunted Buildings in the Weird, Wild World
- "Five Thousand Light-Years to Home," in Black Boy Joy
- "Stronger In Spirit," in Black Panther: Tales of Wakanda
- "Mytek the Mighty" (comic) in 2000AD Smash! Special
- "The Secret Life of the Unclaimed," in A World of Horror
- "The Haunting of 13 Oluwo Street," in Fireside Magazine
- "Dune Song," in Apex Magazine (Also: Year's Best Science Fiction and Fantasy, ed by Jonathan Strahan, 2020)
- "Where Are Our Black Boys on Young Adult Science Fiction and Fantasy Novel Covers?" in Tor.com
- "'Post' for Whom? Examining the Socioeconomics of a Post-Apocalypse" in Strange Horizons
