= Africanfuturism: An Anthology =

2020 Africanfuturism anthology

- Editor: Wole Talabi
- Language: English
- Subject: Africanfuturism
- Genre: Africanfuturism
- Set in: Futuristic-Africa
- Publisher: Brittle Paper
- Publication date: 2020
- Publication place: Nigeria
- Media type: e-Book
- Pages: 113

Africanfuturism: An Anthology is an Africanfuturism anthology edited by Nigerian author Wole Talabi. It contains eight works of short fiction, plus an introduction written by Talabi. It was published by Brittle Paper in October 2020.

== Contents ==
The anthology consists of eight original works of Africanfuturism short fiction. A reprint of Nnedi Okorafor's definition of Africanfuturism was included.

- Introduction by Wole Talabi
- "Egoli" by T. L. Huchu
- "Sunrise" by Nnedi Okorafor
- "Yat Madit" by Dilman Dila
- "Rainmaker" by Mazi Nwonwu
- "Behind Our Irises" by Tlotlo Tsamaase
- "Fort Kwame" by Derek Lubangakene
- "Fruit of the Calabash" by Rafeeat Aliyu
- "Lekki Lekki" by Mame Bougouma Diene

== Background ==
The anthology was published during the ten years anniversary of Brittle Paper. The anthology is the first anthology that "...directly engage with the idea of Africanfuturism." The name of the anthology was inspired by the subgenre coined by Nnedi Okorafor.

== Awards ==
Africanfuturism was a finalist for the 2021 Locus Award for Best Anthology.
