= Binti Trilogy =

Africanfuturist science-fiction novellas by Nnedi Okorafor

- Binti (2015); Binti: Home (2017); Binti: The Night Masquerade (2018)
- Author: Nnedi Okorafor
- Country: Nigeria
- Language: English
- Genre: Science fiction
- Publisher: Tor Books
- Published: 2015–2018
- Media type: Print (hardcover and paperback), audiobook, e-book
- No. of books: 3

The Binti trilogy or Binti Series is a trilogy of Africanfuturist science fiction novellas by Nigerian American author Nnedi Okorafor. Beginning with Binti and ending with Binti: The Night Masquerade, it follows the heroine Binti as she leaves Earth to attend a prestigious university in space.

== Plot Summaries ==
=== Binti (2015) ===
In Binti, Binti is the first member of the Himba people to be accepted into the prestigious intergalactic university Oomza Uni. Upon being notified of her acceptance, Binti runs away from home and boards a transport ship to Oomza Uni. While in transit, the ship is hijacked by the Meduse, a jellyfish-like alien species that was previously at war with the Khoush, another human ethnic group. After the Meduse murder all other inhabitants of the ship, Binti retreats into her private living quarters. She subsequently discovers that a piece of ancient technology she had brought with her from Earth, referred to as her edan, enables direct communication with the Meduse, and that her otjize, a type of mixed clay made from the soil of her homeland, has healing properties when applied to the tentacles of the Meduse. She makes a friend in one of the younger, more hot-headed Meduse, named Okwu, and subsequently brokers a tentative truce between herself and the hijacker; the truce entails Binti's profound physical transformation. Upon arrival at the university, she is able to negotiate a short lasting peace between the Meduse and the human race, after which she begins her studies at Oomza Uni in earnest.

=== Binti: Home (2017) ===
Binti: Home follows the return of Binti back home to face her family and elders after her first year at the off-world Oomza University. Her reconciliation is complicated by her family's hostility, her physical transformation and the presence of her Meduse friend, Okwu. Travelling into the desert, she meets her father's disavowed relatives and under their guidance confronts intra-tribal prejudice and undergoes her second profound physical transformation. Meanwhile, the war between the Meduse and the Khoush erupts, with Binti's family caught in the middle.

=== Binti: The Night Masquerade (2018) ===
The last book in the trilogy, Binti: The Night Masquerade follows Binti as she comes back home exploring her abilities as a harmonizer and must find a way to stop a war waged by the Khoush from destroying Okwu and his race of Meduse.

== Compilation ==
The three novellas were later published as a single edition titled Binti: The Complete Trilogy with the inclusion of a short story "Binti: Sacred Fire".

== Series Listing ==
1. Binti – published in 2015
  1.5. "Binti: Sacred Fire" – published in 2019 as a new short story in the collection Binti: The Complete Trilogy; serves as an interlude between Binti and Home
2. Binti: Home – published in 2017
3. Binti: The Night Masquerade – published in 2018
