= The Hairdresser of Harare =

2010 novel by Tendai Huchu

- First edition
- Author: Tendai Huchu
- Language: English
- Publisher: Weaver Press (2010), Ohio University Press (2015)
- Publication date: 2010
- Publication place: Zimbabwe
- Media type: Print
- Pages: 189
- ISBN: 9781779221094

The Hairdresser of Harare is a novel by Tendai Huchu, first published in 2010. It chronicles an account of contemporary Zimbabwe seen through the eyes of the eponymous character of the book, a hairdresser working in Harare. The novel explores themes of poverty, economic inequality, homophobia, gender roles, and the long-term effects of colonialism.

== Plot summary ==
The novel follows the life of Vimbai, a talented hairdresser working at a salon in Harare, Zimbabwe. Vimbai takes pride in her work and her status as the best hairdresser in the salon, but her world is turned upside down with the arrival of Dumisani, a charming and flamboyant new hairdresser. As Dumisani's popularity grows and he becomes a rival to Vimbai, tensions arise between them, leading to a complex relationship that challenges Vimbai's assumptions about herself and her place in society.
