= David Mogo, Godhunter =

2019 novel by Suyi Davies Okungbowa

- Author: Suyi Davies Okungbowa
- Language: English
- Genre: Fantasy, Godpunk
- Publisher: Abaddon Books
- Publication date: 2019
- Publication place: Nigeria

David Mogo, Godhunter is the debut novel of Nigerian writer Suyi Davies Okungbowa. It was released by Abaddon Books, an imprint of Rebellion Publishing in Oxford, UK on July 9, 2019 in the US and two days later in the UK and Europe.

== Plot ==
The novel follows the titular demigod, who is also a god hunter, as he scours the streets of Okungbowa's native Lagos, Nigeria, in the aftermath of an event called The Falling where thousands of orishas have fallen to the city.

== Reception ==
The novel received good reception, with venues like WIRED commenting that, "a number of books have been termed 'godpunk,' but Suyi Davies Okungbowa's novel may be the subgenre's platonic deific ideal," while Publishers Weekly mentioned that "this story is captivating, and readers who enjoy non-Western fantasy, mythpunk, and tales of found family will find it delightful." However, there were critical mentions of the story structure, which was a novel in three parts, almost akin to a collection of novellas. F(r)iction's Giancarlo Riccobon called it "three books for the price of one") and the treatment of some of the minor characters. But overall, the consensus was that the authorial voice was fresh and welcome, especially in a white-dominated sub-genre.

"American urban fantasy, like any established genre, can get predictable," L.E.H Light of BlackNerdProblems said in a lengthy, favourable review. "David Mogo, Godhunter is anything but."

In October 2020, David Mogo, Godhunter was announced as the winner of the 2020 Nommo Award for Best Speculative Novel by an African (the Ilube Award).

== Awards ==
2020 Nommo Award for Best Speculative Novel by an African (the Ilube Award), won.
