= Lost Ark Dreaming =

2024 science fiction novella by Suyi Davies Okungbowa

- Author: Suyi Davies Okungbowa
- Language: English
- Genre: Science Fiction
- Publisher: Tordotcom Publishing
- Publication date: 21 May 2024
- Pages: 192 (hardcover)
- ISBN: 978-1-250-89075-7

Lost Ark Dreaming is a 2024 dystopian science fiction novella by Suyi Davies Okungbowa. The novel received critical praise, winning both the 2025 Ignyte Award and Nommo Award for Best Novella.

== Plot ==
Decades before the start of the story, a climate catastrophe caused sea levels to rise. Many people now live in the Pinnacle, a partially submerged high rise outside Lagos. Wealthy politicians and powerful citizens live on the upper levels, while impoverished Lowers live below sea level on the bottom floors.

Yekini and Ngozi, two government bureaucrats, are assigned to work together. An emergency alert summons them to the Lower floors, where they meet Level 9 forewoman Tuoyo. A hull breach occurred and was quickly sealed, but Yekini and the others discover that it was not an age-related structural failure. Rather, a sea creature has invaded the Pinnacle. These creatures are known as Yemoja's Children; they are poorly studied, but highly dangerous.

Pinnacle leadership refuses to evacuate the affected floor and begins to flood that level, hoping to flush out the Child at the cost of hundreds of citizens’ lives. Yekini is rescued by the Child, which calls itself Omíwálé. Omíwálé gives Yekini the Queen Conch, an artifact that relates the history of the Children. The first Children were created by the goddess Yemoja when enslaved Africans were thrown over the side of slave ships. Omíwálé asks Yekini and her companions to share this history with the Pinnacle. The group makes its way back to the Midder levels. Tuoyo and Omíwálé agree to serve as a distraction while Yekini and Ngozi broadcast the truth to the tower.

Tuoyo, Omíwálé, and Ngozi are captured as they buy time for Yekini. Just as the police reach her, Yekini uses the power of the Queen Conch to reveal to the tower citizens the history of the Children and the corruption of Pinnacle leadership.

== Major themes ==
In a review for the Los Angeles Review of Books, Jenna N. Hanchey discussed the way in which water is used symbolically in the story. For example, Yekini "is sent to investigate a strange leak in the Lowers—water piercing through the structures meant to keep it at bay. Water teaches us: sometimes structures stand in the way of relations we need." The review also examines the concept of "liquid organizing" from the research of Joëlle M. Cruz and Chigozirim Utah Sodeke. Liquid organizing is defined as "a means of understanding how Africans operate on the margins, engaging in fluid relations that emerge from contextual factors and deep interconnections with one another, rather than being defined top-down by roles within a system and their attendant duties." Hanchey writes that the relationship between Yekini, Ngozi, and Tuoyo can be viewed through the lens of liquid organizing, as they come from three different levels of the tower and cross social barriers in order to challenge the top-down hierarchy of the Pinnacle.

== Style ==
The narrative shifts between the perspectives of the three main characters. Additionally, it contains brief interludes that "fill us in on the past via poetic memories or recorded history from archives."

== Reception and awards ==
Publishers Weekly called the novella a "powerhouse tale of social inequality". The review noted that the work contains "so many meaty themes—among them the power of history, gods, memory, and story-telling—that some inevitably get short shrift". Nevertheless, the review praised the interaction between the three major characters and wrote the "readers will be gratified".

Writing for Locus, Paul Di Filippo writes that Lost Ark Dreaming draws from the heritage of thrillers such as Die Hard which take place in a single setting. It also draws from the Big Dumb Object trope in science fiction while "also managing to tackle issues of climate change, inequality, and authoritarianism." Di Filippo felt that the antagonist in Pinnacle leadership was more of a "stock figure" but praised the "vivid personages, combined with vivid setting, combined with urgent plotting". In a separate review for Locus, Gary K. Wolfe compared the work to the 1927 film Metropolis in its "idea of social stratification enforced through architecture". Wolfe praised the way in which Okungbowa utilizes interludes from present-day Nigeria to "credibly map a path from here to there" with regards to a future dystopia.

A review in Reactor Magazine praised the novel's exploration of complex themes including imperialism, capitalism, colonialism, and climate change; the reviewer notes that while some novellas cannot handle such complexity, Lost Ark Dreaming "handles many big ideas well". The review stated that the work "does lean rather heavily on similar narratives, some quite recent, like Rivers Solomon’s The Deep and Snowpiercer." Writing for the Washington Post, author Charlie Jane Anders states that "the strength of Lost Ark Dreaming lies in Okuongbowa's careful attention to the details of how the systems in this huge, isolated building function." Anders felt that the supernatural elements in the finale were a "left turn" that blunted some of the earlier social realism. Anders writes that "despite that, the story of three characters from different social classes learning to work together remains compelling."

Year	Award	Category	Result	Ref.
2024	Nebula Award	Novella	Nominated	
2025	Ignyte Award	Novella	Won	
2025	Nommo Award	Novella	Won	
2025	RUSA Reading List	Science Fiction	Shortlisted	
