= Dazzling (novel) =

2023 novel by Chikodili Emelumadu

- Author: Chikodili Emelumadu
- Language: English
- Genre: Literary fiction
- Set in: Nigeria
- Publisher: Wildfire
- Publication date: 14 February 2023
- Publication place: United Kingdom
- Media type: Print (paperback)
- Pages: 368
- ISBN: 9781472289650

Dazzling is a 2023 novel written by Nigerian-British writer Chikodili Emelumadu and published by Wildfire in 2023. The novel focuses of Treasure, who is married to a spirit and Ozoemena, who is initiated into the Leopard Society which gives her a shamanistic connection with the Igbo goddess, Idemili. Ozoemena is tasked with finding a tether for the Leopard spirit she hosts.
