= Binti: The Night Masquerade =

2018 science fiction novella by Nnedi Okorafor

- First edition
- Author: Nnedi Okorafor
- Audio read by: Robin Miles
- Cover artist: David Palumbo
- Language: English
- Series: Binti Trilogy
- Genre: Science Fiction
- Publisher: Tor.com
- Publication date: January 2018
- Publication place: Nigeria
- Pages: 208
- ISBN: 978-0-7653-9313-5
- Preceded by: Binti: Home

Binti: The Night Masquerade is a science fiction novella written by Nnedi Okorafor. The novella was published in 2018 by Tor.com, and it is the final novella in the Binti trilogy that began with 2015's Binti and 2017's Binti: Home. When the full collection Binti: The Complete Trilogy was published, Okorafor added another short story titled "Binti: Sacred Fire".

== Plot ==
Binti comes back home exploring her abilities as a harmonizer and must find a way to stop a war waged by the Khoush from destroying Okwu and his race of Meduse.

== Reception ==
The Night Masquerade received a starred review from Booklist. It recommended reading Binti and Home first, but went on to praise Okorafor's "painterly imagery" to reach a satisfying ending to the trilogy. In Locus, Liz Bourke called it an uplifting novella that was deeply compelling thanks to vivid and unadorned prose and strong pacing. AudioFile also praised the vivid imagery as well as the resilience of the characters as performed in the audiobook, calling it unique and refreshing.

On the other hand, reviewing the novella for NPR, Amal El-Mohtar had mixed feelings, saying "After loving Home as much as I did, I wanted more from this, more rigor, more thoughtfulness, more craft." She felt annoyed with the story at times as a casual reader, but from an academic perspective, she found the limits of narrative thought-provocative. Publishers Weekly also had a mixed review with the "dizzying array" of incidents and inadequate foreshadowing, but ultimately felt the work was "vivid, funny, and memorable."

It received nominations for Best Novella in 2018 from the Hugo Awards, the British Fantasy Awards, and the Nommo Awards.

== Series ==
1. Binti – published in 2015
  1.5. "Binti: Sacred Fire" – published in 2019 as a new short story in the collection Binti: The Complete Trilogy; serves as an interlude between Binti and Home
2. Binti: Home – published in 2017
3. Binti: The Night Masquerade – published in 2018
