= Arrows of Rain =

2000 novel by Okey Ndibe

- Author: Okey Ndibe
- Language: English
- Series: African Writers Series
- Genre: Literary fiction
- Publisher: Heinemann Publisher
- Publication date: 2000
- Publication place: Nigeria
- ISBN: 0-435-90657-7
- OCLC: 44629058
- Followed by: Foreign Gods, Inc.

Arrows of Rain is a novel by Nigerian author Okey Ndibe. Published in 2000, it is his debut novel.
