= Binti (novella) =

2015 science fiction novella by Nnedi Okorafor

- Paperback edition
- Author: Nnedi Okorafor
- Cover artist: David Palumbo
- Language: English
- Series: Binti Trilogy
- Genre: Science fiction, Horror
- Publisher: Tor Books
- Publication date: 2015
- Publication place: Nigeria
- Pages: 96
- Awards: Hugo Award for Best Novella; Nebula Award for Best Novella; Nommo Award for Best Novella
- ISBN: 978-0-7653-8525-3
- Followed by: Binti: Home

Binti is an Africanfuturist science fiction novella by Nigerian American writer Nnedi Okorafor. The novella was published in 2015 by Tor.com. Binti is the first novella in Okorafor's Binti novella series.

Binti won multiple prominent literary awards, including the Hugo Award for Best Novella and the Nebula Award for Best Novella. A television adaptation is reportedly under development at Hulu.

Anyaugo Okorafor, the author's daughter, is credited in the acknowledgements for "essentially coming up with the plot of this novella".

== Plot ==
A young woman named Binti is the first member of the Himba people from Earth to be accepted into the prestigious intergalactic university Oomza Uni. Upon being notified of her acceptance, Binti runs away from home and boards a transport ship bound for Oomza Uni. While in transit, the ship is hijacked by the Meduse, a jellyfish-like alien species that was previously at war with the Khoush, another human ethnic group. After the Meduse murder all the other inhabitants of the ship, Binti retreats to her private living quarters. She subsequently discovers that a piece of ancient technology she had brought with her from Earth, referred to as her edan, enables direct communication with the Meduse, and that her otjize, a type of clay mixture made from the soil of her homeland, has healing properties when applied to the Meduse's tentacles. She befriends one of the younger, more hot-headed Meduse, named Okwu, and subsequently brokers a tentative truce between herself and the hijackers; the truce entails a profound physical transformation for Binti. Upon arriving at the university, she is able to negotiate a short-lived peace between the Meduse and the human race, after which she begins her studies at Oomza Uni in earnest.

== Awards and nominations ==
- 2016 Hugo Award winner for Best Novella
- 2015 Nebula Award winner for Best Novella
- 2016 BookTube SFF Award winner for Best Novella (popular vote)
- 2015 BSFA Award finalist for Best Short Story
- 2016 British Fantasy Award finalist for Best Novella
- 2016 Locus Award finalist for Best Novella
- 2017 Nommo Award winner for Best Novella

== Sequels ==
The novella has 2 sequels. The first, Binti: Home, was released on January 31, 2017. The third installment, Binti: The Night Masquerade, was released in January 2018. Subsequently, DAW/Penguin/PRH published an omnibus edition of the three novellas with an additional short story titled "Binti: Sacred Fire", which serves as an interlude between Binti and Home.
