= Otjize =

Butterfat-ochre paste worn by Himba

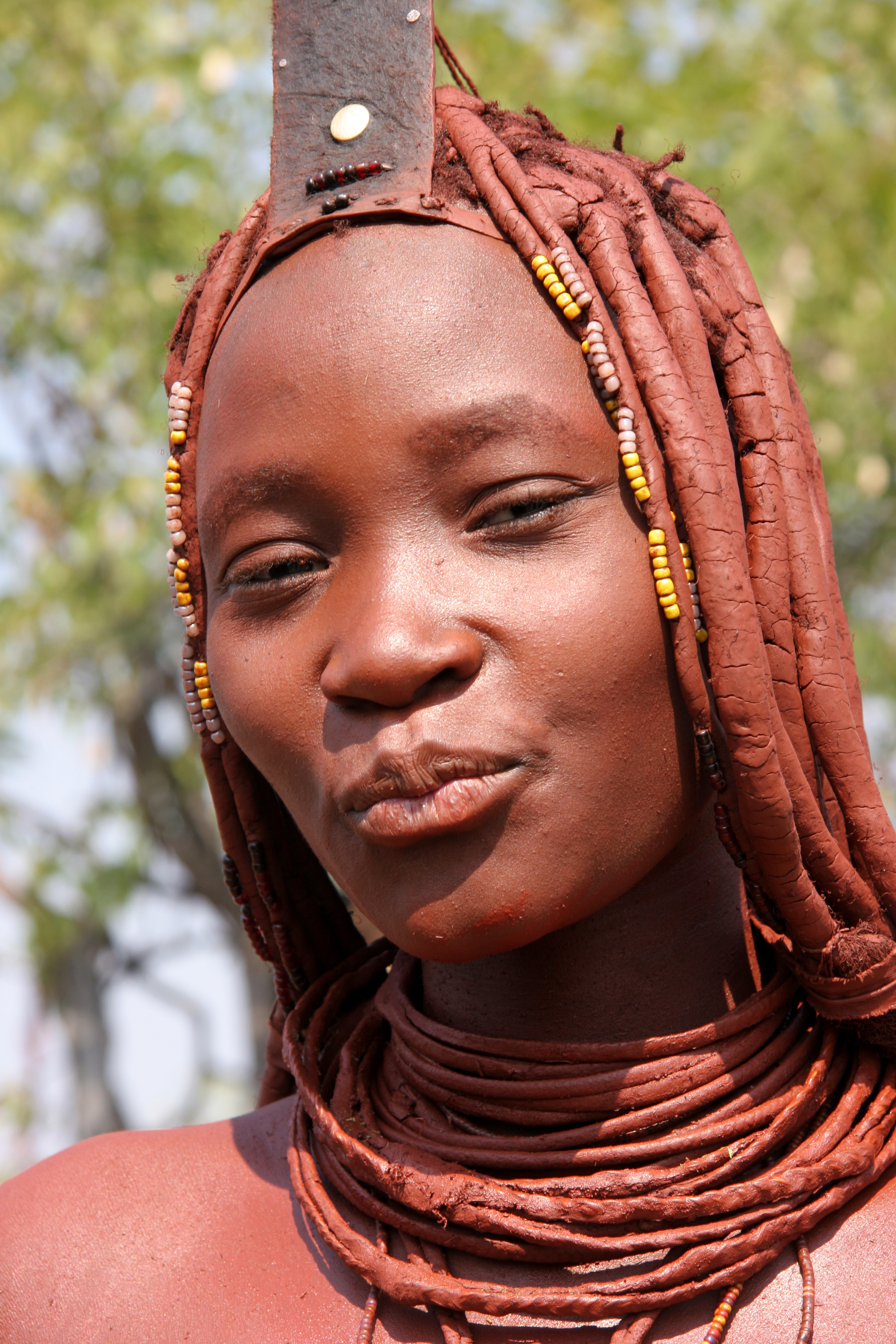
Hair styling of a Himba woman using otjize

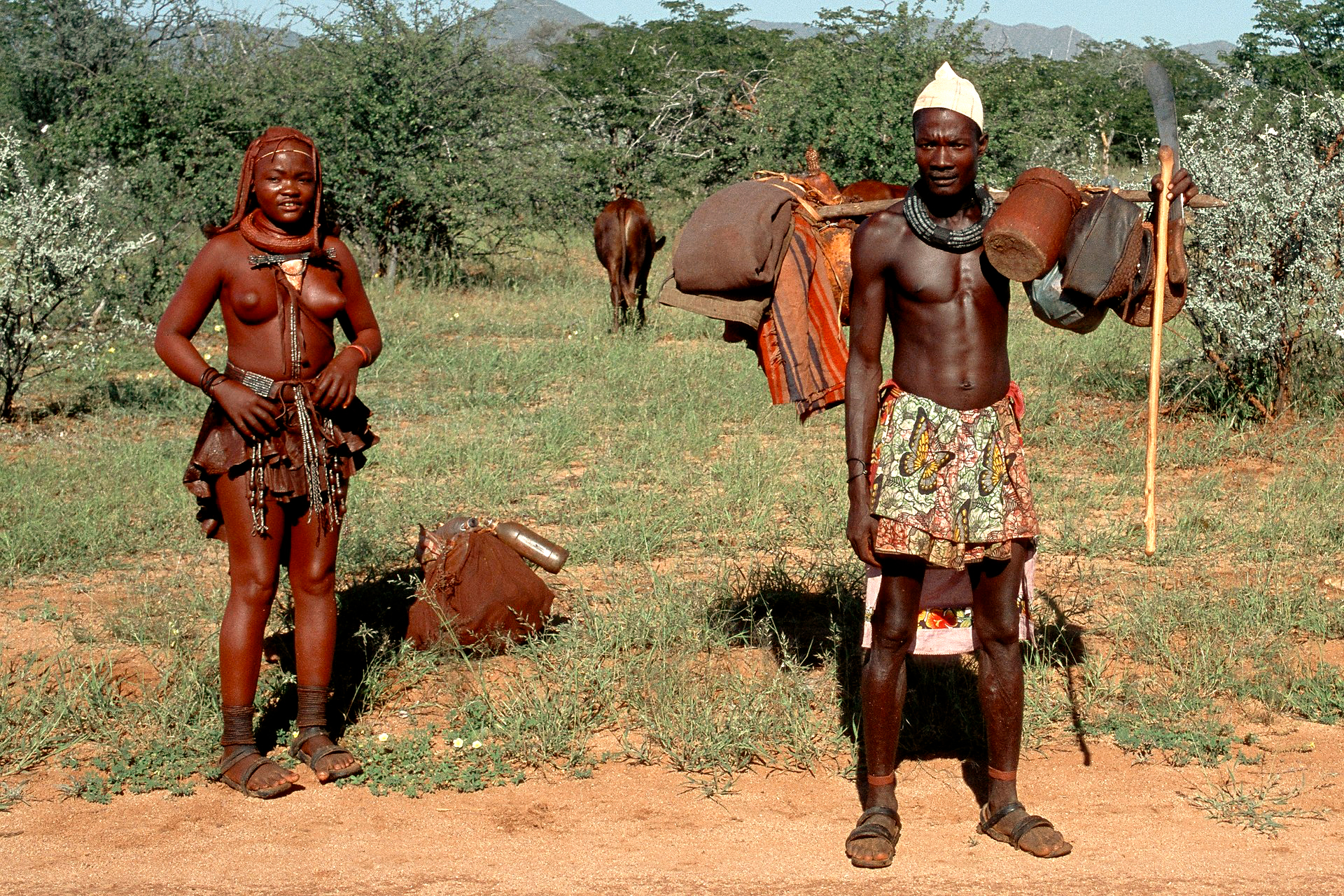
The female herder wears otjize

Otjize is a mixture of butterfat and ochre pigment used by the Himba people of Namibia to protect themselves from the harsh desert climate. The paste is often perfumed with the aromatic resin of Commiphora multijuga (omuzumba). The Himba apply otjize to their skin and hair, which is long and plaited into intricate designs. Himba women start designing their hair from puberty using the red clay as well as adding on the hair of goats for stylistic purposes. Other documented uses of otjize include initiation ceremonies, the burial of human corpses, and as a mosquito repellent. The use of otjize by both men and women has been documented, with the decline in use by men beginning in the 1960s and attributed to "the presence of the South African Defence Force in the region and the subsequent employment of many men as trackers and soldiers".

Otjize is also used for hygienic purposes due to water scarcity. Over time, otjize flakes off, removing dirt and dead skin. Wood ash is used to wash the hair.

== In literature ==
In Nnedi Okorafor's Hugo Award–winning novella Binti (2015), the protagonist's use of otjize represents an "animist spirituality [that] radically decenters human exceptionality while simultaneously imbricating people thoroughly with their material world". For scholar S. R. Toliver, Binti's success in creating otjize on a planet away from her home planet "symbolizes a metaphorical rebirth of the Himba culture in a new land" and "is a lasting remnant of home and healing in a land that was initially defined by surveillance and control".

== Scientific study ==
In 2022 a team of South African and French scientists published a study of otjize's physical properties, concluding that "such a red ochre exhibits an exceptional UV filtration and a significant IR reflectivity substantiating its effectiveness as an effective UV-blocking and solar heat IR reflector in support of the low skin cancer rate within the Namibian Himba community".

== See also ==
- Masonjoany – Cosmetic wood paste worn in Madagascar, Comoros, and Mayotte
