= Chikodili Emelumadu =

British-Nigerian speculative fiction writer

- Chịkọdịlị Emelụmadụ
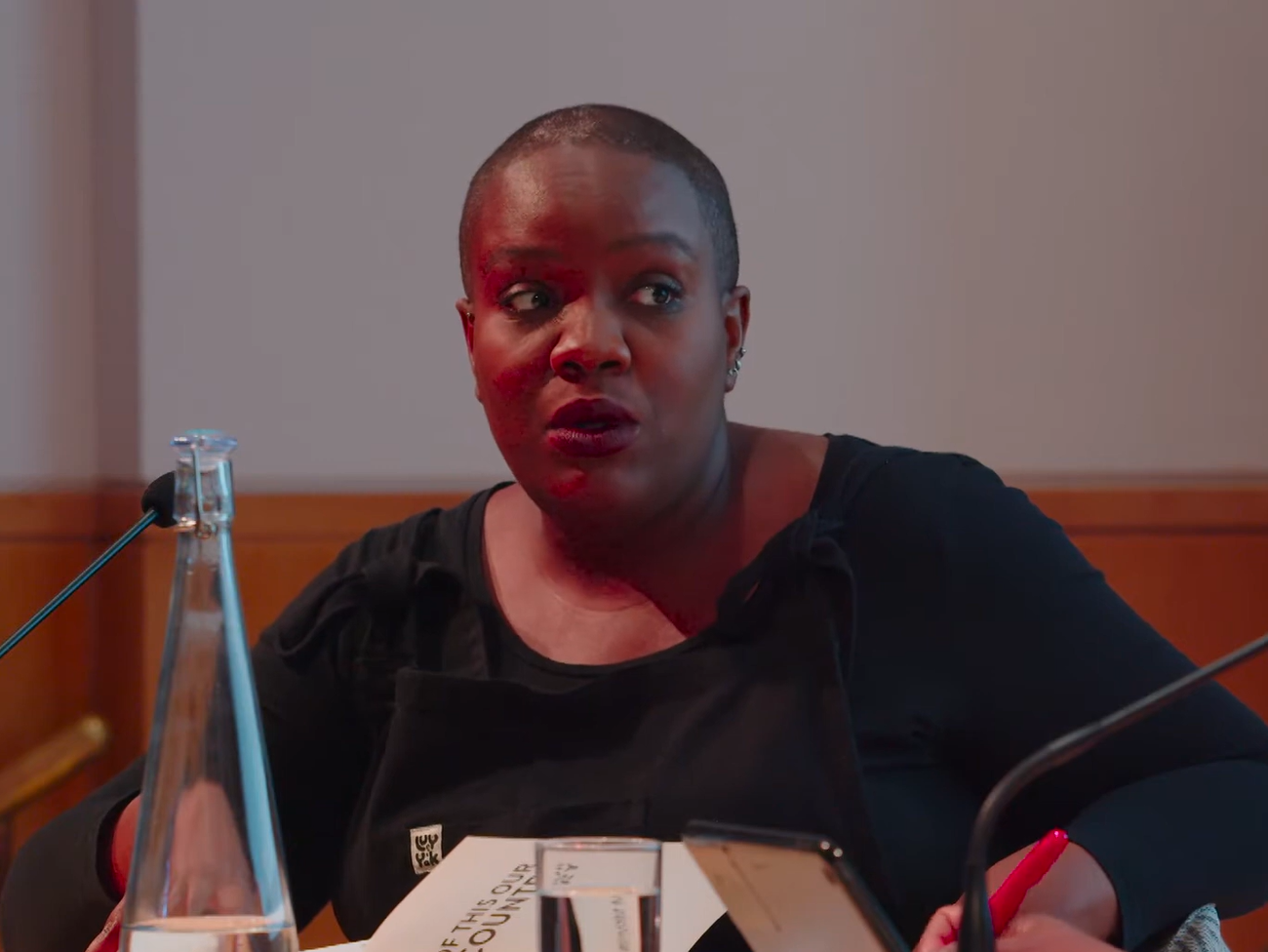
- Chikodili Emelumadu speaking at Africa Writes Festival 2021
- Education: Nnamdi Azikiwe University; Newcastle University; Harlow College
- Writing career
- Genre: Speculative fiction
- Notable work: Dazzling (2023)

Chịkọdịlị Emelụmadụ, also spelled Chikodili Emelumadu, is a British Nigerian speculative fiction writer.

== Early life and education ==
Emelumadu was born in Worksop, Nottinghamshire, England, and was raised in Awka, Nigeria. She is of Igbo heritage. Emelumadu was educated at two Nigerian boarding schools before attending Nnamdi Azikiwe University, graduating with a BA in English language and literature. She later returned to England in 2004 to study for a master's degree in cross cultural communication and international relations at University of Newcastle upon Tyne, as well as a postgraduate diploma in journalism at Harlow College.

== Career ==
Emelumadu worked for some time as a journalist for BBC World Service before quitting at the age of 27 to pursue writing fiction full time.

Emelumadu's short story "Candy Girl" was shortlisted for the Shirley Jackson Awards (2015). Her work has also been shortlisted for the Caine Prize for African Writing (2017 for "Bush Baby" and 2020 for "What to do when your child brings home a Mami Wata"), and a Nommo award (2020). In 2019, she won the inaugural Curtis Brown First Novel prize for her manuscript entitled Dazzling, receiving a cash prize of £3,000 in addition to representation from Curtis Brown agency. Dazzling was eventually published in 2023 and is praised for Emelumadu's use of "Igbo mythology, spirituality, and storytelling" in her writing.

Emelumadu served as juror for the Shirley Jackson Awards in 2018 and 2020.

In 2026, Emelumadu published a novella with the Eden Book Society, a literary hoax created by Dead Ink Books, alongside authors Grady Hendrix, John Darnielle, Nina Allan, Rowan Hisayo Buchanan and Alison Rumfitt. The six novellas were published pseudonymously, leaving readers to guess which author wrote which.

== Personal life ==
As of 2024, Emelumadu lives in Newhaven, East Sussex in England with her children.

== Selected bibliography ==
=== Novels ===
- Dazzling. Hachette UK. 2023. ISBN 978-1-0354-0207-6.

=== Short stories ===
- "Big School". Writers Mosaic. Royal Literary Fund. 2022.
- "Bush Baby". African Monsters. FS Books of Monsters. Fox Spirit. 2016. ISBN 978-1909348844.
- "Candy Girl". Apex Magazine. No. 66. 2014.
- "Sin Eater". Omenana Magazine. No. 13. 2019.
- "Soursop". Apex Magazine. No. 80. 2016. Archived from the original on 31 May 2023.
- "Story, Story: A tale of mothers and daughters". Omenana Magazine. No. 2. 2015.
- "What to do when your child brings home a Mami Wata" ( (PDF)). The Shadow Booth. Vol. 2. 2018. ISBN 9781705427453. Archived from the original on 24 June 2020.
