= Okey Ndibe =

Nigerian writer

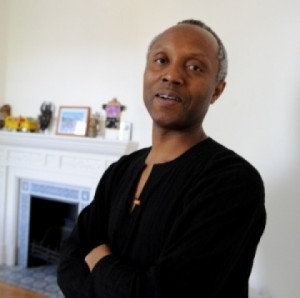
- Author photo for Foreign Gods, Inc.
- Born: 1960 (age 65–66); Yola, Nigeria
- Citizenship: Nigerian
- Education: University of Massachusetts Amherst (MFA, PhD)
- Occupations: Novelist, columnist, essayist
- Writing career
- Genre: Political fiction
- Notable works: Arrows of Rain (novel, 2000); Foreign Gods, Inc. (novel, 2014); Never Look an American in the Eye (memoir, 2016)
- Website: okeyndibe.com

Okechukwu "Okey" Ndibe (born 1960) is a novelist, political columnist, and essayist of Igbo ethnicity. Ndibe was born in Yola, the capital city of Adamawa State, north-eastern Nigeria. He is the author of Arrows of Rain and Foreign Gods, Inc., two critically acclaimed novels published in 2000 and 2014 respectively.

== Career ==
Ndibe worked in Nigeria as a journalist and magazine editor, and came to the United States in 1988 at the invitation of famous Nigerian writer Chinua Achebe. In the United States, Ndibe helped to found African Commentary, a magazine described as "award-winning and widely acclaimed". Ndibe holds both an MFA in writing and a PhD in literature from the University of Massachusetts Amherst. He continued to write for magazines and papers in the United States, winning the 2001 Association of Opinion Page Editors award for best opinion essay in an American newspaper for his piece "Eyes to the Ground: The Perils of the Black Student".

Ndibe has worked as a professor at several colleges, including Connecticut College, Bard College at Simon's Rock, Trinity College in Hartford, Connecticut, and Brown University. He is currently the Shearing Fellow at the Black Mountain Institute at University of Nevada, Las Vegas.

Ndibe is an author of short fiction, novels, poetry and political commentary. He is a regular columnist for NEXT, a Nigerian newspaper. He also contributes to many other publications, including The Hartford Courant, The Fabian Society Journal, Black Issues Book Review, BBC Online. He has contributed poetry to An Anthology of New West African Poets. His first novel, entitled Arrows of Rain, was published in 2000. His second novel, Foreign Gods, Incorporated, was published by Soho Press in 2014; it was named one of the best books of the year by such publications as The New York Times, Inquirer, Cleveland Plain Dealer, and Mosaic, as well as being included in National Public Radio's list of best books of 2014.

== Publication and reception ==
His fiction has been praised by Nobel laureate Wole Soyinka ("...quite a while since I sensed creative promise on this level"), John Edgar Wideman ("first rate fiction"), Ngugi wa Thiong'o ("Moliere-like"), Janet Maslin of the New York Times ("razor-sharp"), Los Angeles Times ("Ndibe seems to have a boundless ear for the lyrical turns of phrase of the working people of rural Nigeria"), and Paste magazine ("just about perfect"), among many others. Janet Maslin, the Philadelphia Inquirer, National Public Radio, Mosaic magazine, Cleveland Plain Dealer, among others, named Foreign Gods, Inc. one of the best 10 or most remarkable books of 2014. The Houston, Texas-based USAfricaonline.com named Ndibe its "African Writer of 2014".

Ndibe is co-editor (with the Zimbabwean writer Chenjerai Hove) of a collection of essays entitled Writers, Writing on Conflicts and Wars in Africa (Adonis Abbey, 2009). Ndibe relocated to the United States in 1988 to serve as founding editor of African Commentary, a magazine described as "award-winning and widely acclaimed." His essay "My Biafran Eyes," about his childhood experience of war, is published in Best of the Web 2008 (Dzanc Books). His poetry is published in New West African Poets, edited by the Gambian writer Tijan Sallah. Ndibe has taught at Brown University in Providence, Rhode Island, Trinity College in Hartford, Connecticut, Simon's Rock of Bard College in Great Barrington, MA, Connecticut College, New London, CT, and the University of Lagos (as a Fulbright scholar). He is currently working on a novel titled Return Flights as well as a memoir, Going Dutch and other American Mis/Adventures.

== Selected publications ==
- Ndibe, Okey (2014). Foreign Gods, Inc. New York City. ISBN 978-1-61695-313-3. OCLC 853618620.
- Ndibe, Okey (2000). Arrows of rain. Oxford: Heinemann. ISBN 0-435-90657-7. OCLC 44629058.
