= Binti: Home =

2017 science fiction novella by Nnedi Okorafor

- First edition
- Author: Nnedi Okorafor
- Cover artist: David Palumbo
- Language: English
- Series: Binti Trilogy
- Genre: Science Fiction
- Publisher: Tor.com
- Publication date: January 2017
- Publication place: Nigeria
- Pages: 176
- ISBN: 9780765393104
- Preceded by: Binti
- Followed by: Binti: The Night Masquerade

Binti: Home is a 2017 science fiction novella written by Nnedi Okorafor and published by Tor.com. Binti: Home is the sequel to Okorafor's Binti from 2015, and is followed by Binti: The Night Masquerade, published in 2018.

== Plot ==
Binti, a young Himba woman from Earth, returns home to face her family and elders after her first year at the off-world Oomza University. Struggling with unpredictable bouts of anger, Binti decides she wants to complete the traditional Himba pilgrimage so she will be cleansed. Binti’s Meduse friend, Okwu, comes to Earth with her as an ambassador for his people. The pair must travel on The Third Fish, the ship where Binti survived the traumatic murder of her peers by the Meduse. Binti continues to panic and have nightmares on her journey home, constantly dropping into a meditation called “treeing.” When Binti arrives at home, she joins her family at her welcoming dinner. Her sister, Vera, and her other siblings express anger that Binti left home. Vera tells Binti that her selfishness has left their father unwell, as she was supposed to take over their family shop. Later, Binti accidentally drops her edan, and it shatters into pieces. While trying to fix it, she then sees a strange figure outside her window. Binti identifies the figure as The Night Masquerade, which only men are supposed to be able to see. At this time, the Desert People, whom the Himba view as primitive and mentally unstable, come to take Binti away. Binti goes with the Desert People, including her grandmother, to their village. Her grandmother says Binti can fix her edan if she finally embraces her heritage as a desert person, or as Zinariya. Binti is “initiated” and undergoes a transformation. With her new abilities, Binti senses that Okwu is in trouble. Binti rushes home to stop the Khoush from killing Okwu.

== Reception ==
Amal El-Mohtar, reviewing the novella for NPR, and Catherine Grant who reviewed it for the New York Journal of Books, both praised Okorafor's writing and her flouting of genre boundaries, but found the cliffhanger ending somewhat unsatisfying.

Binti: Home was a finalist for both the Hugo Award for Best Novella and the Locus Award for Best Novella in 2018.

== Series ==
1. Binti – published in 2015
  1.5. "Binti: Sacred Fire" – published in 2019 as a new short story in the collection Binti: The Complete Trilogy; serves as an interlude between Binti and Home
2. Binti: Home – published in 2017
3. Binti: The Night Masquerade – published in 2018
