= Chinelo Onwualu =

Nigerian editor and writer

Chinelo Onwualu is a Nigerian editor and a speculative fiction writer. She is the co-founder and previous editor-in-chief of Omenana Magazine. She is also co-editor at Anathema Magazine.

== Early life and career ==
Onwualu was born in Nigeria. She co-founded Omenana Magazine with Mazi Nwonwu. She is currently the nonfiction editor of Anathema Magazine and a staff writer at NPR. Her works has appeared at Uncanny Magazine, Slate Magazine and Strange Horizons. She is a contributor in the New Sun anthology which has gathered positive reviews.

== Awards and honours ==
She was a nominee of the Nommo Awards, British Science Fiction Award, and Short Story Day Africa Award. She is a finalist for the 2021 Ignyte Award for the Community Award category with Andrew Wilmot. Her short story "What The Dead Man Said" was listed as among the five post-A apocalyptic and dystopian stories by African authors by Tor.com. She was among the authors that attended the Houston book event of 2021. Her book "What The Dead Man Said" was selected as one of the best science fiction and fantasy books of 2019 by The Washington Post.
