= Omenana Magazine =

Nigerian speculative fiction Magazine

- Issue 18 on 18 July 2021
- Managing Editor: Fred Chiagozie Nwonwu.
- Former editors: Chinelo Onwualu
- Categories: Speculative fiction; science fiction and fantasy
- Frequency: Tri-monthly
- Founder: Fred Chiagozie Nwonwu; Chinelo Onwualu
- Founded: 2014; 12 years ago
- First issue: November 30, 2014; 11 years ago
- Company: Seven Hills Media
- Country: Nigeria
- Based in: Lagos
- Language: English
- Website: omenana.com

Omenana Magazine is a speculative fiction online magazine that publishes stories by writers from Africa and the African diaspora. It is edited and published by Fred Chiagozie Nwonwu. It was founded in 2014 by Fred Chiagozie Nwonwu and Chinelo Onwualu.

The magazine publishes original works by authors such as Tochi Onyebuchi Oghenechovwe Donald Ekpeki, Ayodele Olofintuade, Chikodili Emelumadu and Tendai Huchu.

The magazine published nine issues within three years.
