= Son of the Storm =

2021 novel by Suyi Davies Okungbowa

- First edition
- Author: Suyi Davies Okungbowa
- Language: English
- Series: Nameless Republic trilogy
- Genre: Fiction
- Publisher: Hachette Book Group, Orbit Books
- Publication date: 11 May 2021
- Publication place: Nigeria
- Pages: 496
- ISBN: 9780316540391
- OCLC: 13475110

Son of the Storm is a 2021 novel by Nigerian author Suyi Davies Okungbowa.

== Plot ==
The novel takes place in the fictional continent of Oon, which is presumably pre-colonial Africa, inhabited by three distinct people: Mainlanders, Desertlanders and Shashis; a combination of Mainlanders and Desertlanders. In the continent, Bassa is featured to be the strongest among the whole city-countries in the continent. The country is mainly inhabited by the Bassai, with immigrants who have to pass through different stages of Castes in the country. The Yalekutés who are not allowed to study, act as helpers known as Seconds to the Bassais and Pokotin caste as the working-class immigrants who are not allowed to study either. Danso, a shashi who is allowed to study because he was caught with the codex of Nogowu the mad Emperor of Bassa discovers that the things he learnt as a Jali Novitiate in the University of Bassa were actually true and not tales and myths as posed by the Jali Elders when a yellow skin from the Nameless Islands is seen in Bassa. Nem the Fixer lays her hand on the grey ibor; learning how to use it. She kills the Speaker of the nation of Bassa and made the city-country to believe it was the yellowskin. The yellowskin, who is injured from a fight with Nem goes to Danso’s house. Danso, who is supposed to be with his intended – Esheme – the daughter of Nem the Fixer, helps the yellowskin escape from Bassa with his Second – Zaq – through the Breathing Forest. On their journey through the forest, a lightning bat known as a Skopi attacks them. The yellowskin, Lilong, who is a amber iborworker kills it with her blade. The Skopi gets on to Danso, thus activating the red ibor in his hand – giving him the power to control the bat. Esheme takes over the Great Dome proclaiming herself Esheme the Red Emperor. She then goes after Danso and Lilong. Danso and Lilong escapes with a few Whudans.

== Characters ==
- Danso – a Shashi scholar and main protagonist.
- Esheme – a Idu scholar, Danso’s intended, and the main antagonist.
- Liliong – a yellowskin and Danso’s friend.
- Nem the Fixer – Esheme’s mother.
- DaaHabba – Danso's father.
- Oboda – Nem and Esheme's bodyguard.
- Zaq – Danso’s bodyguard.
- Igan – Esheme's lover, a hunthand, and non-binary.
- Biemwensé – a Shashi and previous Supreme Magnanimous.
- Dǫta – the First Elder.
- Ikobi – Esheme's mentor at University of Bassa.
- Ariase – Dota's bodyguard.
- Basuaye the Cockroach – the head of the Coaliation of a New Bassa.
- Afanfan — Biemwensé’s errand boy.
- Owude - Biemwensé’s second errand boy.
- Elder Oduvie – a Jali Elder at University of Bassa.
- Kakutan - a Shashi and current Supreme Magnanimous.
- Oke – Daughter of Abuso: the Speaker of Bassa.
- Abuso – the nation’s speaker.

== Reception ==
The book received several positive reception. NPR Books said of it: "Okungbowa's control of power, relationships, plot twists, and politics throughout gets high marks." Library Journal, which gave the novel a starred review, highly recommended it for "fans of epic fantasy based on non-European mythologies...readers who enjoy protagonists on troubled journeys...or anyone who likes to chew on stories with complex shenanigans." Tor.com's Alex Brown said it was "epic fantasy that breaks the rules," praising Okungbowa's worldbuilding and attention to detail. Publishers Weekly called it a "series starter [that] promises more good things to come."

== Awards and recognition ==
- Top New Fantasy Book by Den of Geek.
- Best Science Fiction And Fantasy Books by BuzzFeed News.
- The 30 Most Anticipated SFF Books of 2021 by Tor.com.
