= Tendai Huchu =

Zimbabwean author (born 1982)

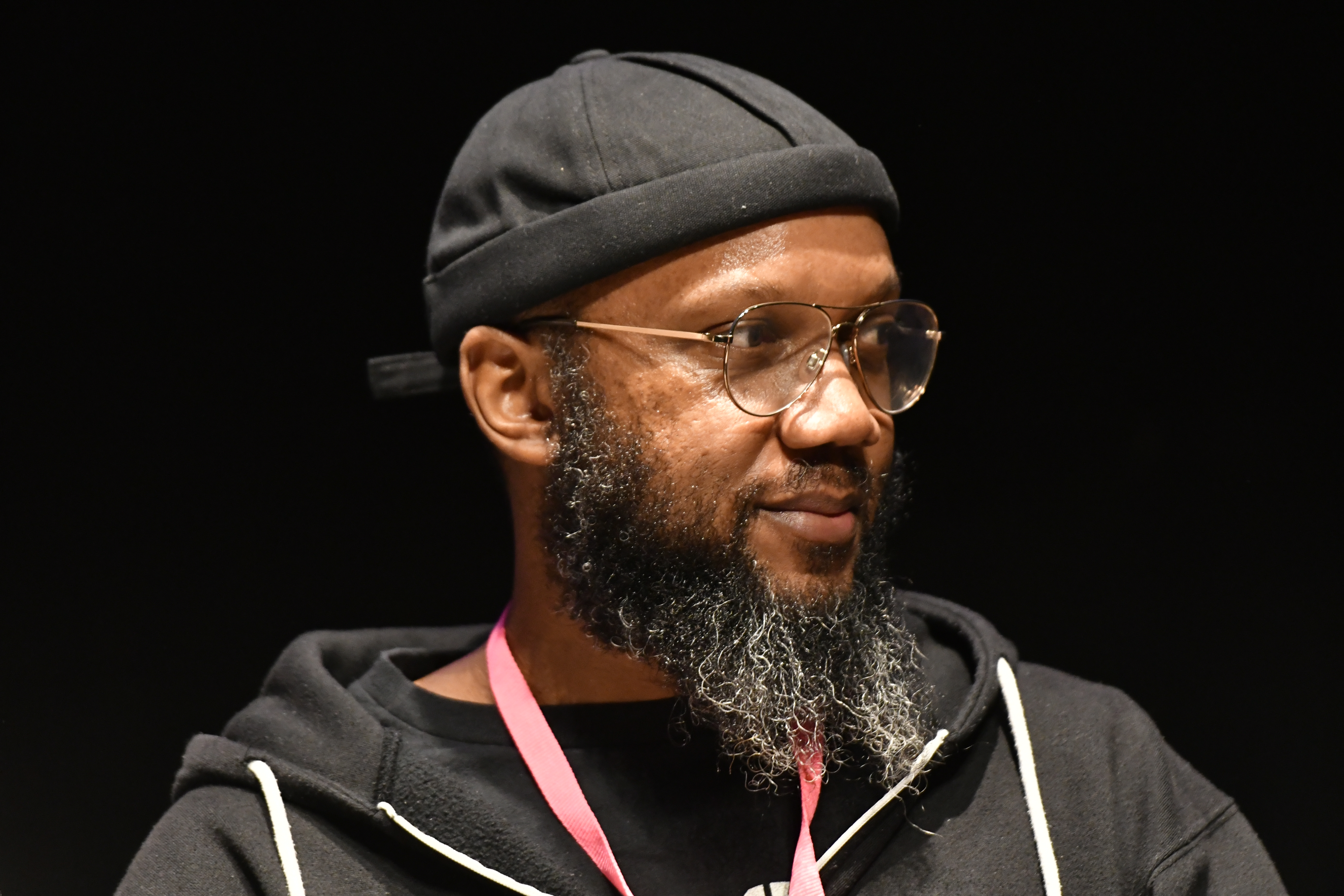
- Huchu in 2024
- Born: 28 September 1982 (age 44); Bindura, Zimbabwe
- Education: University of Zimbabwe
- Occupation: Author
- Writing career
- Notable works: The Hairdresser of Harare (2010), The Maestro, The Magistrate & The Mathematician (2014)

Tendai Huchu (born 28 September 1982), who also writes as T. L. Huchu, is a Zimbabwean author, known for his novels The Hairdresser of Harare (2010), The Maestro, The Magistrate & The Mathematician (2014), and The Edinburgh Nights series.

== Early life ==
Huchu was born in Bindura, Zimbabwe in 1982. He received most of his education in English, rather than Shona, his first language. Huchu emigrated to the UK in 2002 for economic opportunities.

== Career ==
Tendai Huchu's first novel, The Hairdresser of Harare, was released in 2010 to critical acclaim, and has been translated into German, French, Italian and Spanish. His short fiction in multiple genres and nonfiction have appeared in Enkare Review, The Manchester Review, Ellery Queen's Mystery Magazine, Gutter, Interzone, AfroSF, Wasafiri, Warscapes, The Africa Report and elsewhere. In 2013, he received a Hawthornden Fellowship and a Sacatar Fellowship. He was shortlisted for the 2014 Caine Prize.

As of 2015, he is a podiatrist in Edinburgh.

Huchu's second novel, The Maestro, the Magistrate & the Mathematician, concerns a group of Zimbabweans living in Scotland, one of whom is secretly a spy. Jeanne-Marie Jackson contends that Huchu tests the genre of globality with the structure of the novel, and by weaving together narration about the three friends in the book, he can let their lives contrast and disrupt each other.

Huchu wrote "The Sale" for AfroSF, which was edited by Ivor Hartmann and the first published anthology of African speculative fiction. The story concerns a man protesting the sale of the Great Zimbabwe to China under a colonial regime where the US and China control reproduction and force men to take feminizing hormones.

Huchu's Edinburgh Nights series is a set of five books about Ropa Moyo, a teenager who uses her ability to talk to ghosts to solve mysteries and eventually gets tangled in the magical rivalries between Scotland and England. The series began with The Library of the Dead, a dark urban fantasy introducing Moyo as a 14-year old who passes messages between the living and the dead using an mbira to help her family pay rent.

Huchu reflected that he would prefer to write in Shona but had received most of his literary education and exposure in English, making it so "your thinking is in English, not Shona; it's what the system was designed for." He says opportunities for writers in Shona are very limited, with the main publishing audience being school curricula, and only one literary journal accepting Shona fiction: Munyori. For the Jalada language project, he translated a short story by Ngũgĩ wa Thiong’o into Shona.

== Awards ==
Year	Work	Award	Category	Result	Ref.
2014	"The Intervention"	Caine Prize	—N/a	Shortlisted	
2017	"The Marriage Plot"	Nommo Award	Short Story	Won (Note: Tied with “Who Will Greet You at Home” by Lesley Nneka Arimah)	
2019	"Njuzu"	Nommo Award	Short Story	Shortlisted	
2019	"HostBods"	Grand Prix de l’Imaginaire	Foreign Short Fiction	Shortlisted	
2021	"Corialis"	Nommo Award	Short Story	Shortlisted	
2021	The Hairdresser of Harare	Children's Africana Book Award	Best Book for New Adults	Won	
2022	The Library of the Dead	Nommo Award	Novel	Won	
2022	The Library of the Dead	Alex Award	—N/a	Won	
2023	Our Lady of Mysterious Ailments	Hurston/Wright Legacy Award	Speculative Fiction	Won	
2026	Secrets of the First School	BSFA Award	Best Fiction For Younger Readers	Shortlisted	
2026	Secrets of the First School	Nommo Award	Novel	Shortlisted	
2026	The Cancellation of Michael Z.	Nommo Award	Short Story	Shortlisted	

== Publications ==
Edinburgh Nights series

- The Library of the Dead. New York, Tor Books, 2021, ISBN 9781250767783
- Our Lady of Mysterious Ailments, New York, Tor Books, 2022, ISBN 9781250767790
- The Mystery at Dunvegan Castle, London, Pan Macmillan, 2023, ISBN 9781529097726
- The Legacy of Arniston House, New York, Tor Books, 2024, ISBN 9781250883094
- Secrets of the First School, New York, Tor Books, 2025, ISBN 9781250440914

Standalone works

- The Hairdresser of Harare. Oxford, Weaver Press, 2010
- The Maestro, The Magistrate & The Mathematician. Cardigan, AmaBooks, 2014
