= Furrow (disambiguation) =

A furrow is a line cut in soil when ploughed in order to plant a crop.

Furrow may also refer to:

- The Furrow, an Irish Roman Catholic theological periodical
- Furrows (film), a 1951 Spanish film
- The Furrows, a 2022 novel by Namwali Serpell

== People with the surname ==
- Buford O. Furrow, Jr. (born 1961), American neo-Nazi
- James Furrow, American theologian

== See also ==
- Cleavage furrow, the indentation of the cell's surface that begins the progression of cleavage
