= Jane Eyre =

1847 novel by Charlotte Brontë

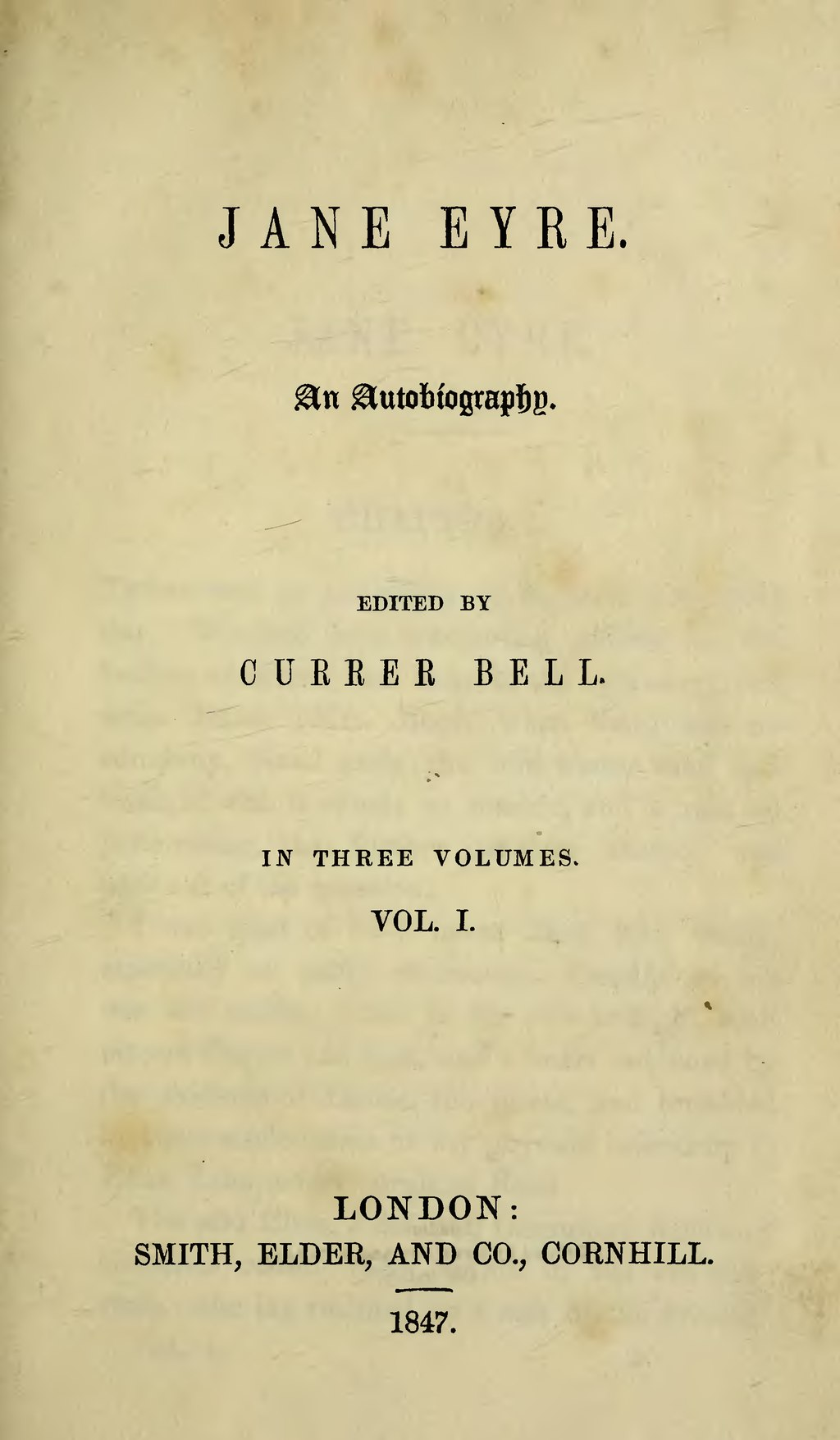
- Title page of the first edition, 1847
- Author: Charlotte Brontë
- Language: English
- Genre: Gothic; Bildungsroman; Romance
- Set in: Northern England, early 19th century (Note: The exact time setting of the novel is impossible to determine, as several references in the text are contradictory. For example Marmion (pub. 1808) is referred to in Chapter 32 as a "new publication", but Adèle mentions crossing the Channel by steamship, impossible before 1816.)
- Publisher: Smith, Elder & Co.
- Publication date: 19 October 1847
- Publication place: United Kingdom
- Media type: Print
- OCLC: 3163777
- Dewey Decimal: 823.8
- Followed by: Shirley
- Text: Jane Eyre at Wikisource

Jane Eyre (/ɛər/ AIR; originally published as Jane Eyre: An Autobiography) is a novel by the English writer Charlotte Brontë. It was published under her pen name "Currer Bell" on 19 October 1847 by Smith, Elder & Co. of London. The first American edition was published in January 1848 by Harper & Brothers of New York. Jane Eyre is a bildungsroman that follows the experiences of its eponymous heroine, including her growth to adulthood and her love for Mr Rochester, the brooding master of Thornfield Hall.

The novel revolutionised prose fiction, being the first to focus on the moral and spiritual development of its protagonist through an intimate first-person narrative, where actions and events are coloured by a psychological intensity. Literary critic Daniel S. Burt has called Charlotte Brontë "the first historian of the private consciousness" and the literary ancestor of writers such as Marcel Proust and James Joyce.

The book contains elements of social criticism with a strong sense of Christian morality at its core, and it is considered by many to be ahead of its time because of Jane's individualistic character and how the novel approaches the topics of class, sexuality, religion and feminism. Jane Eyre, along with Jane Austen's Pride and Prejudice, is one of the most famous romance novels. It is considered one of the greatest novels in the English language, and in 2003 was ranked as the tenth best-loved book in Britain by the BBC in The Big Read poll.

== Plot ==
Jane Eyre is divided into 38 chapters. It was originally published in three volumes in the 19th century, consisting of chapters 1 to 15, 16 to 27, and 28 to 38.

The second edition was dedicated to William Makepeace Thackeray.

The novel is a first-person narrative from the perspective of the title character. Its setting is somewhere in the north of England, late in the reign of George III (1760–1820). It has five distinct stages: Jane's childhood at Gateshead Hall, where she is emotionally and physically abused by her aunt and cousins; her education at Lowood School, where she gains friends and role models but suffers privations and oppression; her time as governess at Thornfield Hall, where she falls in love with her mysterious employer, Edward Fairfax Rochester; her time in the Moor House, during which her earnest but cold clergyman cousin, St John Rivers, proposes to her; and ultimately her reunion with, and marriage to, her beloved Rochester. Throughout these sections it provides perspectives on a number of important social issues and ideas, many of which are critical of the status quo.

The five stages of Jane's life are as follows:

=== Gateshead Hall ===
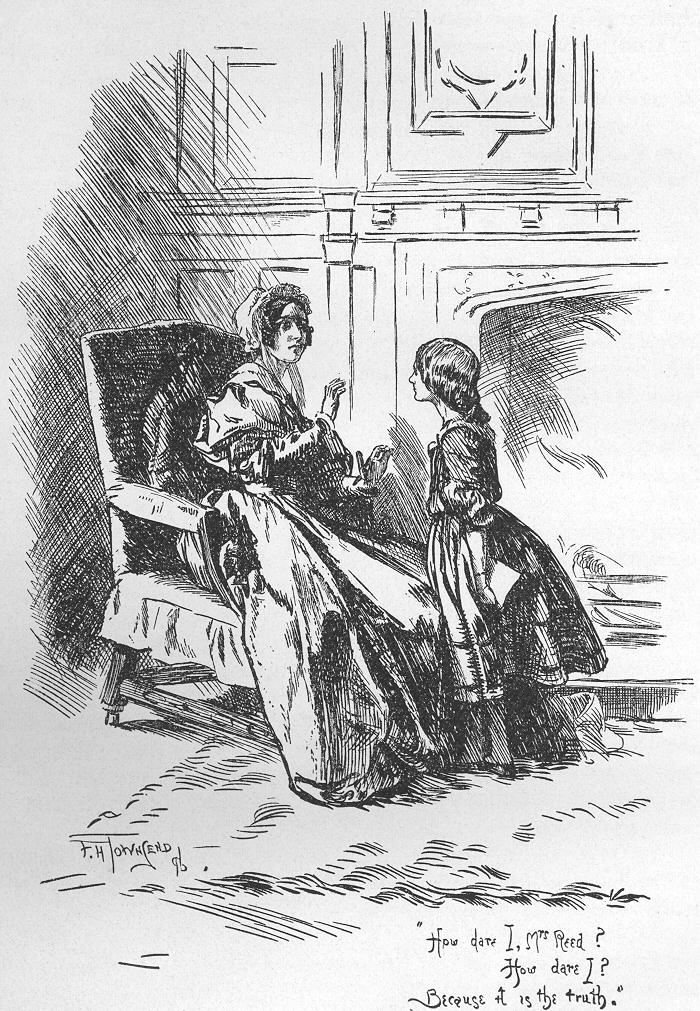
Young Jane argues with her guardian, Mrs Reed of Gateshead, illustration by F. H. Townsend

Jane Eyre, aged 10, lives at Gateshead Hall with her maternal uncle's family, the Reeds, as a result of her uncle's dying wish. Jane was orphaned several years earlier when her parents died of typhus. Jane's uncle, Mr Reed, was the only one in the Reed family who was kind to Jane. Jane's aunt, Sarah Reed, dislikes her and treats her as a burden. Mrs Reed also discourages her three children from associating with Jane. As a result Jane becomes defensive against her cruel judgement. The nursemaid, Bessie, proves to be Jane's only ally in the household, even though Bessie occasionally scolds Jane harshly. Excluded from the family activities, Jane lives an unhappy childhood. One day, as punishment for defending herself against the bullying of her 14-year-old cousin John, the Reeds' only son, Jane is locked in the red room in which her late uncle had died; there she faints from panic after she thinks she has seen his ghost. The red room is significant because it lays the grounds for the "ambiguous relationship between parents and children" which plays out in all of Jane's future relationships with male figures throughout the novel. She is subsequently attended to by the kindly apothecary, Mr Lloyd, to whom Jane reveals how unhappy she is living at Gateshead Hall. He recommends to Mrs Reed that Jane should be sent to school, an idea Mrs Reed happily supports.

Mrs Reed then enlists the aid of the harsh Mr Brocklehurst, the director of Lowood Institution, a charity school for girls, to enrol Jane. Mrs Reed cautions Mr Brocklehurst that Jane has a "tendency to deceit", which he interprets as Jane being a liar. Before Jane leaves, however, she confronts Mrs Reed and declares that she'll never call her "aunt" again. Jane also tells Mrs Reed and her daughters, Georgiana and Eliza, that they are the ones who are deceitful, and that she will tell everyone at Lowood how cruelly the Reeds treated her. Mrs Reed is hurt badly by these words but has neither the courage nor the tenacity to show it.

=== Lowood Institution ===
At Lowood Institution, a school for poor and orphaned girls, Jane soon finds that life is harsh. She attempts to fit in and befriends an older girl, Helen Burns. During a class session her new friend is criticised for her poor stance and dirty nails and receives a lashing as a result. Later Jane tells Helen that she could not have borne such public humiliation, but Helen philosophically tells her that it would be her duty to do so. Jane then tells Helen how badly she has been treated by Mrs Reed, but Helen tells her that she would be far happier if she did not bear grudges.

In due course Mr Brocklehurst visits the school. While Jane is trying to make herself look inconspicuous, she accidentally drops her slate, thereby drawing attention to herself. She is then forced to stand on a stool and is branded a sinner and a liar. Later Miss Temple, the caring superintendent, facilitates Jane's self-defence and publicly clears her of any wrongdoing. Helen and Miss Temple are Jane's two main role models who positively guide her development despite the harsh treatment she has received from many others.

The 80 pupils at Lowood are subjected to cold rooms, poor meals and thin clothing. Many students fall ill when a typhus epidemic strikes; Helen dies of consumption in Jane's arms. When Mr Brocklehurst's maltreatment of the pupils is discovered, several benefactors erect a new building and install a sympathetic management committee to moderate Mr Brocklehurst's harsh rule. Conditions at the school then improve dramatically.

=== Thornfield Hall ===
After six years as a pupil and two as a teacher at Lowood, Jane decides to leave in pursuit of a new life, growing bored with her life at Lowood. Her friend and confidante, Miss Temple, also leaves after getting married. Jane advertises her services as a governess in a newspaper. The housekeeper at Thornfield Hall, Alice Fairfax, replies to Jane's advertisement. Jane takes the position, teaching Adèle Varens, a young French girl.

One night, while Jane is carrying a letter to the post from Thornfield, a horseman and dog pass her. The horse slips on ice and throws the rider. Despite the rider's surliness, Jane helps him get back onto his horse. Later, back at Thornfield, she learns that this man is Edward Rochester, master of the house. Adèle was left in his care when her mother, a famous dancer, abandoned her. It is not immediately apparent whether Adèle is Rochester's daughter.

At Jane's first meeting with Mr Rochester he teases her, accusing her of bewitching his horse to make him fall. Jane stands up to his initially arrogant manner. Despite his strange behaviour, Mr Rochester and Jane soon come to enjoy each other's company and they spend many evenings together.

Odd things start to happen at the house, such as a strange laugh being heard, a mysterious fire in Mr Rochester's room (from which Jane saves Rochester by rousing him and throwing water on him) and an attack on a house-guest named Mr Richard Mason.

After Jane saves Mr Rochester from the fire, he thanks her tenderly and emotionally, and that night Jane feels strange emotions of her own towards him. The next day, however, he leaves unexpectedly for a distant party and several days later returns with the whole party, including the beautiful and talented Blanche Ingram. Just as she realises that she is in love with Mr Rochester, Jane sees that he and Blanche favour each other and starts to feel jealous, particularly because she also sees that Blanche is snobbish and heartless.

Jane then receives word that Mrs Reed has suffered a stroke and is calling for her. Jane returns to Gateshead Hall and remains there for a month to tend to her dying aunt. Mrs Reed confesses to Jane that she wronged her, bringing forth a letter from Jane's paternal uncle, Mr John Eyre, in which he asks for her to live with him and be his heir. Mrs Reed admits to telling Mr Eyre that Jane had died of fever at Lowood. Soon afterward Mrs Reed dies, and Jane helps her cousins after the funeral before returning to Thornfield.

Back at Thornfield Jane broods over Mr Rochester's rumoured impending marriage to Blanche Ingram. However one midsummer evening Rochester baits Jane by saying how much he will miss her after getting married and how she will soon forget him. The normally self-controlled Jane reveals her feelings for him. To her surprise, Rochester reciprocates, having courted Blanche only to make Jane jealous, and proposes marriage. Jane is at first sceptical of his sincerity, before accepting his proposal. She then writes to her Uncle John, telling him of her happy news.

As she prepares for her wedding Jane's forebodings arise when a strange woman sneaks into her room one night and rips Jane's wedding veil in two. As with the previous mysterious events, Mr Rochester attributes the incident to Grace Poole, one of his servants. During the wedding ceremony, however, Mr Mason and a lawyer declare that Mr Rochester cannot marry because he is already married to Mr Mason's sister, Bertha. Mr Rochester admits this is true but explains that his father tricked him into the marriage for her money. Once they were united he discovered that she was rapidly descending into congenital madness, and so he eventually locked her away in Thornfield, hiring Grace Poole as a nurse to look after her. When Grace gets drunk, Rochester's wife escapes and causes the strange happenings at Thornfield.

It turns out that Jane's uncle, Mr John Eyre, is a friend of Mr Mason's and was visited by him soon after Mr Eyre received Jane's letter about her impending marriage. After the marriage ceremony is broken off, Mr Rochester asks Jane to go with him to the south of France and live with him as husband and wife, even though they cannot be married. Jane is tempted but realises that she will lose herself and her integrity if she allows her passion for a married man to consume her and she must stay true to her Christian values and beliefs; moreover, by going with him, any real promise of security from the estate in England would be lost. Refusing to go against her principles, and despite her love for Rochester, Jane leaves Thornfield Hall at dawn before anyone else is up.

=== Moor House ===
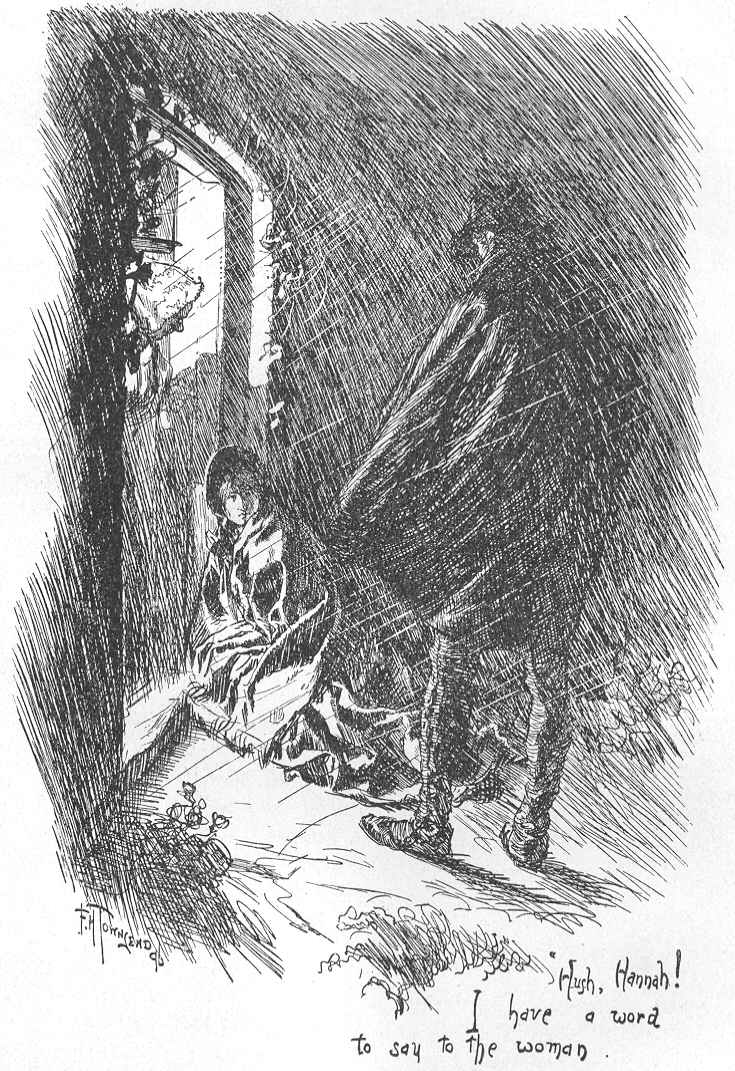
St John Rivers admits Jane to Moor House, illustration by F. H. Townsend

Jane travels as far from Thornfield Hall as she can using the little money she had previously saved. She accidentally leaves her bundle of possessions on the coach and is forced to sleep on the moor. She unsuccessfully attempts to trade her handkerchief and gloves for food. Exhausted and starving, she eventually makes her way to the home of Diana and Mary Rivers but is turned away by the housekeeper. She collapses on the doorstep, preparing for her death. Clergyman St John Rivers, Diana and Mary's brother, rescues her. After Jane regains her health, St John finds her a teaching position at a nearby village school. Jane becomes good friends with the sisters, but St John remains aloof.

The sisters leave for governess jobs, and St John becomes slightly closer to Jane. St John learns Jane's true identity and astounds her by telling her that her uncle, John Eyre, has died and left her his entire fortune of 20,000 pounds (equivalent to US $2.24 million in 2022). When Jane questions him further, St John reveals that John Eyre is also his and his sisters' uncle. They had once hoped for a share of the inheritance but were left virtually nothing. Jane, overjoyed by finding that she has living and friendly family members, insists on sharing the money equally with her cousins, and Diana and Mary come back to live at Moor House.

=== Proposals ===
Thinking that the pious and conscientious Jane will make a suitable missionary's wife, St John asks her to marry him and to go with him to India, not out of love, but out of duty. Jane initially accepts going to India but rejects the marriage proposal, suggesting they travel as brother and sister. As Jane's resolve against marriage to St John begins to weaken, she seems to hear Mr Rochester's voice calling her name. Jane then returns to Thornfield Hall to see if Rochester is all right, only to find blackened ruins. She learns that Rochester sent Mrs Fairfax into retirement and Adèle to school a few months following her departure. Shortly afterwards, his wife set the house on fire and died after jumping from the roof. While saving the servants and attempting to rescue his wife, Rochester lost a hand and his eyesight.

Jane reunites with Rochester, and he is overjoyed at her return, but fears that she will be repulsed by his condition. "Am I hideous, Jane?", he asks. "Very, sir; you always were, you know", she replies. Now a humbled man, Rochester vows to live a purer life, and reveals that he has intensely pined for Jane ever since she left. He had even called out her name in despair one night, the very call that she heard from Moor House, and heard her reply from miles away, signifying the connection between them. Jane asserts herself as a financially independent woman and assures him of her love, declaring that she will never leave him. Rochester proposes again, and they are married. The narrator breaks the fourth wall and in a famous metafictional manner directly addresses the reader: "Reader, I married him." They live blissfully together in an old house in the woods called Ferndean Manor. The couple stay in touch with Adèle as she grows up, as well as Diana and Mary, who each gain loving husbands of their own. St John moves to India to accomplish his missionary goals, but is implied to have fallen gravely ill there. Rochester regains sight in one eye two years after his and Jane's marriage, enabling him to see their newborn son.

== Major characters ==
In order of first line of dialogue:

=== Introduced in first chapter ===
- Jane Eyre: The novel's narrator and protagonist. Orphaned as a baby, Jane struggles through her nearly loveless childhood and becomes a governess at Thornfield Hall. Small and facially plain, Jane is passionate and strongly principled and values freedom and independence. She also has a strong conscience and is a determined Christian. She is ten at the beginning of the novel, and nineteen or twenty at the end of the main narrative. As the final chapter of the novel states that she has been married to Edward Rochester for ten years, she is approximately thirty at its completion.
- Mrs Sarah Reed (née Gibson): Jane's maternal aunt by marriage, who reluctantly adopted Jane in accordance with her late husband's wishes. According to Mrs Reed, he pitied Jane and often cared for her more than for his own children. Mrs Reed's resentment leads her to abuse and neglect the girl. She lies to Mr Brocklehurst about Jane's tendency to lie, preparing him to be severe with Jane when she arrives at Brocklehurst's Lowood School.
- John Reed: Jane's fourteen-year-old first cousin who bullies her incessantly and violently, sometimes in his mother's presence. Addicted to food and sweets, causing him ill health and bad complexion. John eventually ruins himself as an adult by drinking and gambling and is rumoured to have killed himself.
- Eliza Reed: Jane's thirteen-year-old first cousin. Envious of her more attractive younger sister and a slave to a rigid routine, she self-righteously devotes herself to religion. She leaves for a nunnery near Lisle (France) after her mother's death, determined to estrange herself from her sister.
- Georgiana Reed: Jane's eleven-year-old first cousin. Although beautiful and indulged, she is insolent and spiteful. Her elder sister Eliza foils Georgiana's marriage to the wealthy Lord Edwin Vere when the couple is about to elope. Georgiana eventually marries a "wealthy worn-out man of fashion."
- Bessie Lee: The nursemaid at Gateshead Hall. She often treats Jane kindly, telling her stories and singing her songs, but she has a quick temper. Later, she marries Robert Leaven with whom she has three children.
- Miss Martha Abbot: Mrs Reed's maid at Gateshead Hall. She is unkind to Jane and tells Jane she has less right to be at Gateshead than a servant does.

=== Chapters 3–5 ===
- Mr Lloyd: A compassionate apothecary who recommends that Jane be sent to school. Later, he writes a letter to Miss Temple confirming Jane's account of her childhood and thereby clears Jane of Mrs Reed's charge of lying.
- Mr Brocklehurst: The clergyman, director, and treasurer of Lowood School, whose maltreatment of the pupils is eventually exposed. A religious traditionalist, he advocates for his charges the most harsh, plain, and disciplined possible lifestyle, but, hypocritically, not for himself and his own family. His second daughter, Augusta, exclaimed, "Oh, dear papa, how quiet and plain all the girls at Lowood look… they looked at my dress and mama's, as if they had never seen a silk gown before."
- Miss Maria Temple: The kind superintendent of Lowood School, who treats the pupils with respect and compassion. She helps clear Jane of Mr Brocklehurst's false accusation of deceit and cares for Helen in her last days. Eventually, she marries Reverend Naysmith.
- Miss Scatcherd: A sour and strict teacher at Lowood. She constantly punishes Helen Burns for her untidiness but fails to see Helen's substantial good points.
- Helen Burns: Jane's best friend at Lowood School. She refuses to hate those who abuse her, trusts in God, and prays for peace one day in heaven. She teaches Jane to trust Christianity and dies of consumption in Jane's arms. Elizabeth Gaskell, in her biography of the Brontë sisters, wrote that Helen Burns was 'an exact transcript' of Maria Brontë, who died of consumption at age 11.

=== Chapters 11–12 ===
- Mrs Alice Fairfax: The elderly, kind widow and the housekeeper of Thornfield Hall; distantly related to the Rochesters.
- Adèle Varens: An excitable French child to whom Jane is a governess at Thornfield Hall. Adèle's mother was a dancer named Céline. She was Mr Rochester's mistress and claimed that Adèle was Mr Rochester's daughter, though he refuses to believe it due to Céline's unfaithfulness and Adèle's apparent lack of resemblance to him. Adèle seems to believe that her mother is dead (she tells Jane in chapter 11, "I lived long ago with mamma, but she is gone to the Holy Virgin"). Mr Rochester later tells Jane that Céline actually abandoned Adèle and "ran away to Italy with a musician or singer" (ch. 15). Adèle and Jane develop a strong liking for one another, and although Mr Rochester places Adèle in a strict school after Jane flees Thornfield Hall, Jane visits Adèle after her return and finds a better, less severe school for her. When Adèle is old enough to leave school, Jane describes her as "a pleasing and obliging companion—docile, good-tempered and well-principled", and considers her kindness to Adèle well repaid.
- Grace Poole: "…a woman of between thirty and forty; a set, square-made figure, red-haired, and with a hard, plain face…" Mr Rochester pays her a very high salary to keep his mad wife, Bertha, hidden and quiet. Grace is often used as an explanation for odd happenings at the house such as strange laughter that was heard not long after Jane arrived. She has a weakness for drinking that occasionally allows Bertha to escape.
- Edward Fairfax Rochester: The master of Thornfield Hall. He has a "dark, strong, and stern" face. He married Bertha Mason years before the novel begins, although readers are unaware of this until much later. Rochester is an example of a Byronic hero.
- Leah: The housemaid at Thornfield Hall.

=== Chapters 17–21 ===
- Blanche Ingram: Young socialite whom Mr Rochester plans to marry. Though possessing great beauty and talent, she treats social inferiors, Jane in particular, with undisguised contempt. Mr Rochester exposes her and her mother's mercenary motivations when he puts out a rumour that he is far less wealthy than they imagine.
- Richard Mason: An Englishman whose arrival at Thornfield Hall from the West Indies unsettles Mr Rochester. He is the brother of Rochester's first wife, the woman in the attic, and still cares about his sister's well-being. During the wedding ceremony of Jane and Mr Rochester, he exposes the bigamous nature of the marriage.
- Robert Leaven: The coachman at Gateshead Hall, who brings Jane the news of the death of the dissolute John Reed, an event which has brought on Mrs Reed's stroke. He informs her of Mrs Reed's wish to see Jane before she dies.

=== Chapters 26–32 ===
- Bertha Antoinetta Mason: The first wife of Edward Rochester. After their wedding, her mental health began to deteriorate, and she is now violent and in a state of intense derangement, apparently unable to speak or go into society. Mr Rochester, who insists that he was tricked into the marriage by Bertha's family, who knew she was likely to develop this condition, has kept Bertha locked in the attic at Thornfield Hall for years. She is supervised and cared for by Grace Poole, whose drinking sometimes allows Bertha to escape. After Richard Mason stops Jane and Mr Rochester's wedding, Rochester finally introduces Jane to Bertha: "In the deep shade, at the farther end of the room, a figure ran backwards and forwards. What it was, whether beast or human being, one could not, at first sight, tell… it snatched and growled like some strange wild animal: but it was covered with clothing, and a quantity of dark, grizzled hair, wild as a mane, hid its head and face." Eventually, Bertha sets fire to Thornfield Hall and throws herself to her death from the roof. Bertha is viewed as Jane's "double": Jane is pious and just, while Bertha is savage and animalistic. Though her race is never mentioned, it is sometimes conjectured that she was of mixed race. Rochester suggests that Bertha's parents wanted her to marry him, because he was of "good race", implying that she was not pure white, while he was. There are also references to her "dark" hair and "discoloured" and "black" face. A number of writers during the Victorian period suggested that madness could result from a racially "impure" lineage, compounded by growing up in a tropical West Indian climate.
- Diana and Mary Rivers: Sisters in a remote moors house who take Jane in when she is hungry and friendless, having left Thornfield Hall without making any arrangements for herself. Financially poor but intellectually curious, the sisters are deeply engrossed in reading the evening Jane appears at their door. Eventually, they are revealed to be Jane's cousins. They want Jane to marry their stern clergyman brother so that he will stay in England rather than journey to India as a missionary. Diana marries naval Captain Fitzjames, and Mary marries clergyman Mr Wharton. The sisters remain close to Jane and visit her and Rochester every year.
- Hannah: The kindly housekeeper at the Rivers home; "…comparable with the Brontës' well-loved servant, Tabitha Aykroyd."
- St John Eyre Rivers: A handsome, though severe and serious, clergyman who befriends Jane and turns out to be her cousin. St John is thoroughly practical and suppresses all of his human passions and emotions, particularly his love for the beautiful and cheerful heiress Rosamond Oliver, in favour of good works. He wants Jane to marry him and serve as his assistant on his missionary journey to India. After Jane rejects his proposal, St John goes to India unmarried.
- Rosamond Oliver: A beautiful, kindly, wealthy, but rather simple young woman, and the patron of the village school where Jane teaches. Rosamond is in love with St John, but he refuses to declare his love for her because she would not be suitable as a missionary's wife. She eventually becomes engaged to the respected and wealthy Mr Granby.
- Mr Oliver: Rosamond Oliver's wealthy father, who owns a foundry and needle factory in the district. "…a tall, massive-featured, middle-aged, and grey-headed man, at whose side his lovely daughter looked like a bright flower near a hoary turret." He is a kind and charitable man, and he is fond of St John.

== Context ==
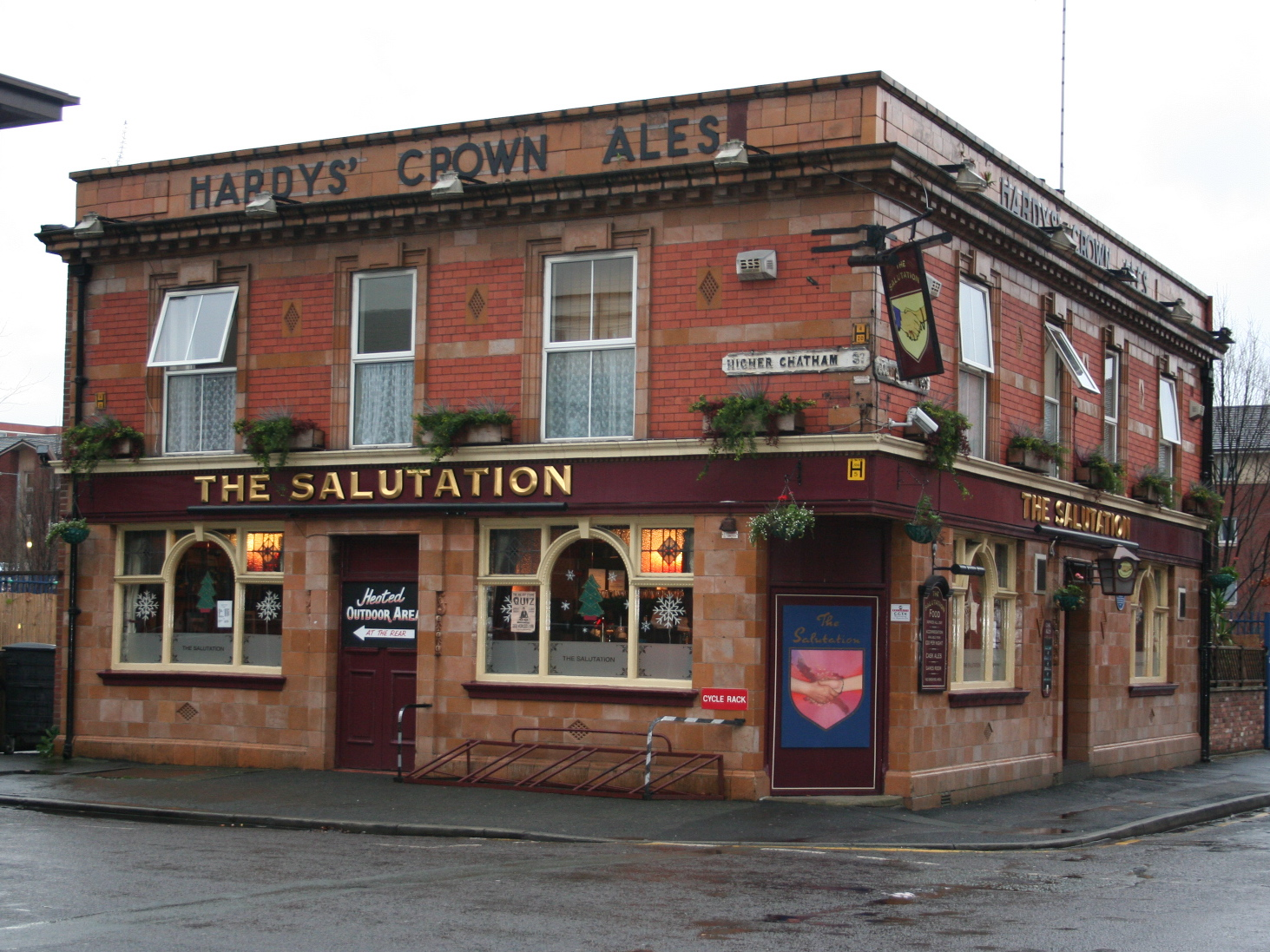
The Salutation pub in Hulme, Manchester, where Brontë began to write Jane Eyre; the pub was a lodge in the 1840s.

The early sequences, in which Jane is sent to Lowood, a harsh boarding school, are derived from the author's own experiences. Helen Burns's death from tuberculosis (referred to as consumption) recalls the deaths of Charlotte Brontë's sisters, Elizabeth and Maria, who died of the disease in childhood as a result of the conditions at their school, the Clergy Daughters School at Cowan Bridge, near Tunstall, Lancashire. Mr Brocklehurst is based on Rev. William Carus Wilson (1791–1859), the Evangelical minister who ran the school. Additionally, John Reed's decline into alcoholism and dissolution recalls the life of Charlotte's brother Branwell, who became an opium and alcohol addict in the years preceding his death. Finally, like Jane, Charlotte became a governess. These facts were revealed to the public in The Life of Charlotte Brontë (1857) by Charlotte's friend and fellow novelist Elizabeth Gaskell.

The Gothic manor of Thornfield Hall was probably inspired by North Lees Hall, near Hathersage in the Peak District in Derbyshire. This was visited by Charlotte Brontë and her friend Ellen Nussey in the summer of 1845, and is described by the latter in a letter dated 22 July 1845. It was the residence of the Eyre family, and its first owner, Agnes Ashurst, was reputedly confined as a lunatic in a padded second floor room. It has been suggested that the Wycoller Hall in Lancashire, close to Haworth, provided the setting for Ferndean Manor to which Mr Rochester retreats after the fire at Thornfield: there are similarities between the owner of Ferndean—Mr Rochester's father—and Henry Cunliffe, who inherited Wycoller in the 1770s and lived there until his death in 1818; one of Cunliffe's relatives was named Elizabeth Eyre (née Cunliffe). The sequence in which Mr Rochester's wife sets fire to the bed curtains was prepared in an August 1830 homemade publication of Brontë's The Young Men's Magazine, Number 2. Charlotte Brontë began composing Jane Eyre in Manchester, and she likely envisioned Manchester Cathedral churchyard as the burial place for Jane's parents and Manchester as the birthplace of Jane herself. The novel may also have been inspired by Charlotte's visit to Norton Conyers house in North Yorkshire in 1839 as governess to the then-tenants' grandchildren. The house has a family legend of a madwoman confined in the attics.

== Adaptations and influence ==
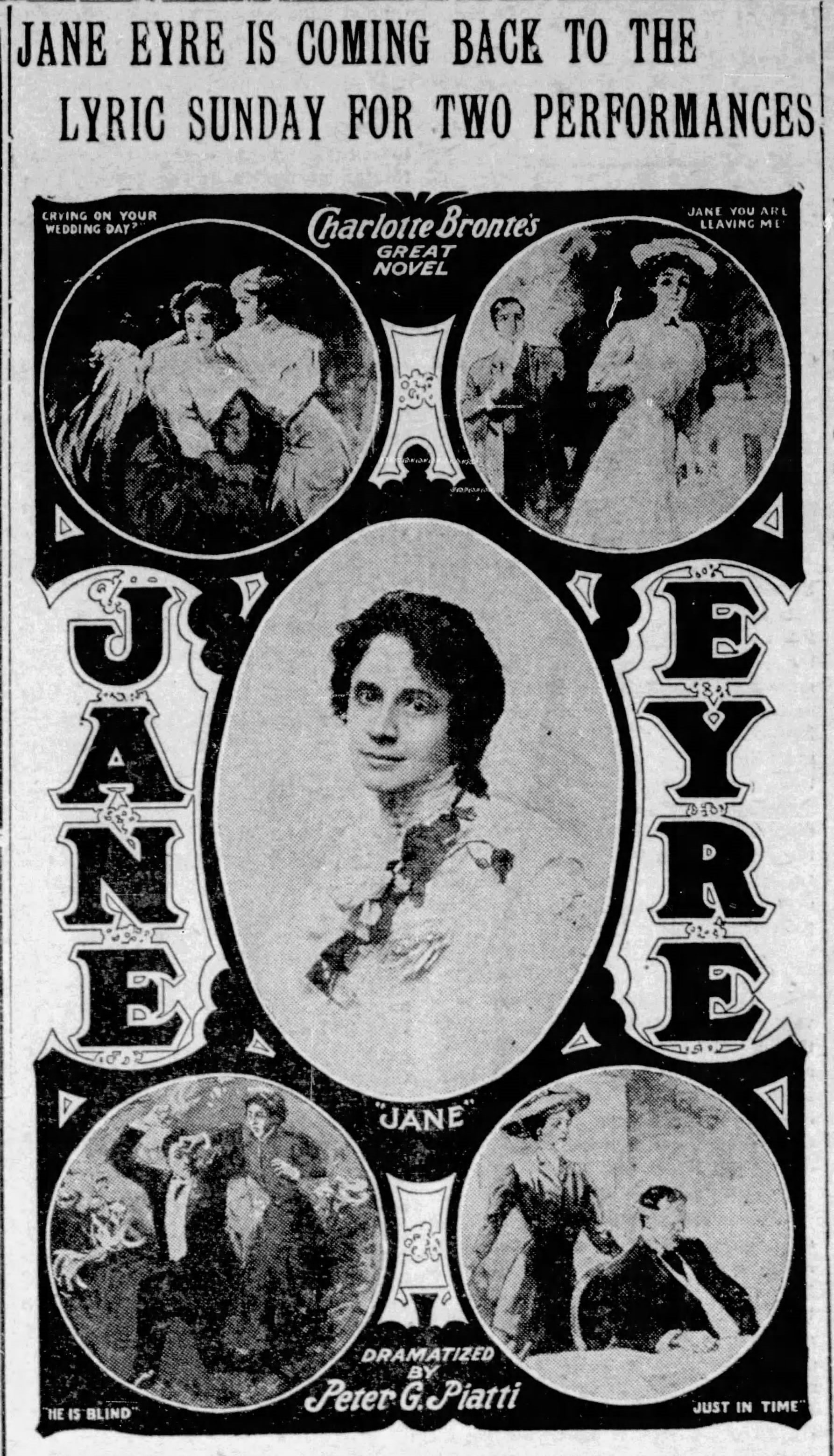
Advertisement for a theatre adaptation of Jane Eyre, 1908

The novel has been adapted into a number of other forms, including theatre, film, television, and at least three full-length operas. The novel has also been the subject of a number of significant rewritings and related interpretations, notably Jean Rhys's seminal 1966 novel Wide Sargasso Sea.

A famous line in the book is at the beginning of Chapter 38: "Reader, I married him." Many authors have used a variation of this line in their work. For example, Liane Moriarty discussed and used the line in her 2018 novel Nine Perfect Strangers.

The book Reader, I Married Him: Stories inspired by Jane Eyre, a 2016 anthology of short stories, edited by Tracy Chevalier, was also inspired by this line. It was commissioned to mark the 200th anniversary of Brontë's birth, and is published by The Borough Press, an imprint of HarperCollins.

Thai novel Ruk Diow Kong Jenjira was adapted by Nida in 1993. In 1996, it was made into a television drama on Channel 3 starred by Willie McIntosh and Sirilak Pongchoke.

The novel The French Dancer's Bastard (2006), by Emma Tennant, reimagines the back story of Adèle, exploring whether she was Rochester's love child and what her relationship with Jane Eyre is.

The most recent film adaptation, Jane Eyre, was released in 2011, directed by Cary Joji Fukunaga, and starred Mia Wasikowska as Jane Eyre and Michael Fassbender as Mr. Rochester. The film, actors, and costume design team were nominated and won various awards from 2011 to 2012.

== Reception ==
=== Contemporary reviews ===
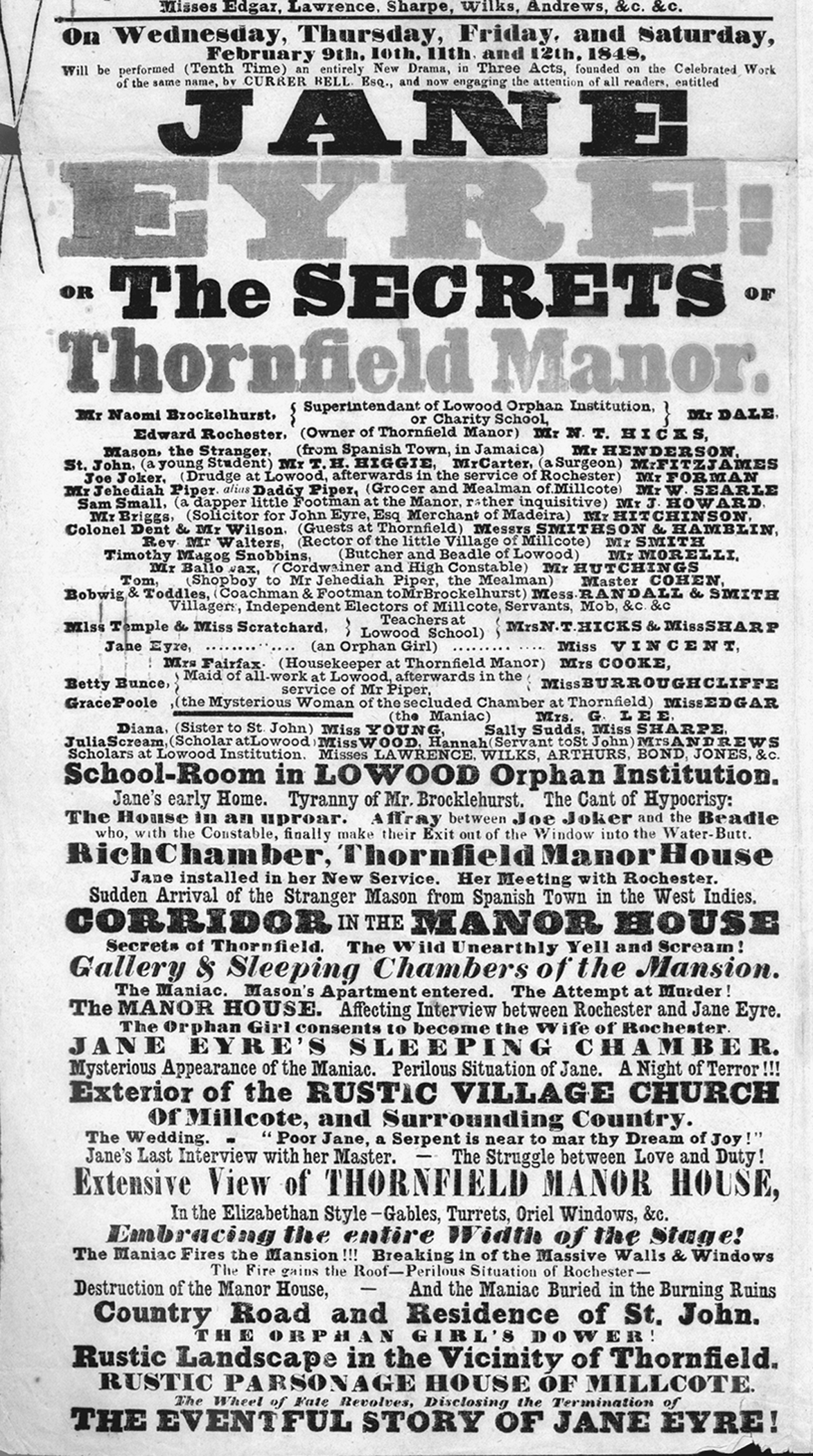
Jane Eyre at The Old Vic in 1848, starring Eliza Ann Vincent

Jane Eyre's initial reception contrasts starkly to its reputation today. In 1848, Elizabeth Rigby (later Elizabeth Eastlake), reviewing Jane Eyre in The Quarterly Review, found it "pre-eminently an anti-Christian composition," declaring: "We do not hesitate to say that the tone of mind and thought which has overthrown authority and violated every code human and divine abroad, and fostered Chartism and rebellion at home, is the same which has also written Jane Eyre."

An anonymous review in The Mirror of Literature, Amusement, and Instruction writes of "the extraordinary daring of the writer of Jane Eyre"; however, the review is mostly critical, summarising: "There is not a single natural character throughout the work. Everybody moves on stilts—the opinions are bad—the notions absurd. Religion is stabbed in the dark—our social distinctions attempted to be levelled, and all absurdly moral notions done away with."

There were some who felt more positive about the novel contemporaneously. George Henry Lewes said, "It reads like a page out of one's own life; and so do many other pages in the book." Another critic from the Atlas newspaper wrote: "It is full of youthful vigour, of freshness and originality, of nervous diction and concentrated interest ...It is a book to make the pulses gallop and the heart beat, and to fill the eyes with tears."

A review in The Era praised the novel, calling it "an extraordinary book", observing that "there is much to ponder over, rejoice over, and weep over, in its ably-written pages. Much of the heart laid bare, and the mind explored; much of greatness in affliction, and littleness in the ascendant; much of trial and temptation, of fortitude and resignation, of sound sense and Christianity—but no tameness."

The People's Journal compliments the novel's vigour, stating that "the reader never tires, never sleeps: the swell and tide of an affluent existence, an irresistible energy, bears him onward, from first to last. It is impossible to deny that the author possesses native power in an uncommon degree—showing itself now in rapid headlong recital, now in stern, fierce, daring dashes in portraiture—anon in subtle, startling mental anatomy—here in a grand illusion, there in an original metaphor—again in a wild gush of genuine poetry."

American publication The Nineteenth Century defended the novel against accusations of immorality, describing it as "a work which has produced a decided sensation in this country and in England... Jane Eyre has made its mark upon the age, and even palsied the talons of mercenary criticism. Yes, critics hired to abuse or panegyrize, at so much per line, have felt a throb of human feeling pervade their veins, at the perusal of Jane Eyre. This is extraordinary—almost preternatural—smacking strongly of the miraculous—and yet it is true... We have seen Jane Eyre put down, as a work of gross immorality, and its author described as the very incarnation of sensualism. To any one, who has read the work, this may look ridiculous, and yet it is true."

The Indicator, concerning speculation regarding the gender of the author, wrote: "We doubt not it will soon cease to be a secret; but on one assertion we are willing to risk our critical reputation—and that is, that no woman wrote it. This was our decided conviction at the first perusal, and a somewhat careful study of the work has strengthened it. No woman in all the annals of feminine celebrity ever wrote such a style, terse yet eloquent, and filled with energy bordering sometimes almost on rudeness: no woman ever conceived such masculine characters as those portrayed here."

=== Twentieth century ===
Literary critic Jerome Beaty believed the close first-person perspective leaves the reader "too uncritically accepting of her worldview", and often leads reading and conversation about the novel towards supporting Jane, regardless of how irregular her ideas or perspectives are. One reviewer has compared Jane Eyre to Shirley Conran's 1982 novel Lace in terms of their influence on women readers.

In 2003, Jane Eyre was ranked number 10 in the BBC's survey The Big Read, a survey to find British people's favourite novel.

During the period of the Cultural Revolution, Jane Eyre was banned in China on the grounds that it would corrupt the youth.

=== Twenty-first century ===
During the 2025-2026 school year, four school districts in the State of Texas in the United States banned Jane Eyre because it was deemed "unsuitable for young readers". By contrast, in the same year, the novel was made required reading for 14- and 15-year-olds in Chinese schools "as a counter to social media and its touting of "materialistic culture and money".

== Genres ==
=== Romance ===
Before the Victorian era, Jane Austen wrote literary fiction that influenced later popular fiction, as did the work of the Brontë sisters produced in the 1840s. Brontë's love romance incorporates elements of both the gothic novel and Elizabethan drama, and "demonstrate[s] the flexibility of the romance novel form."

=== Gothic ===
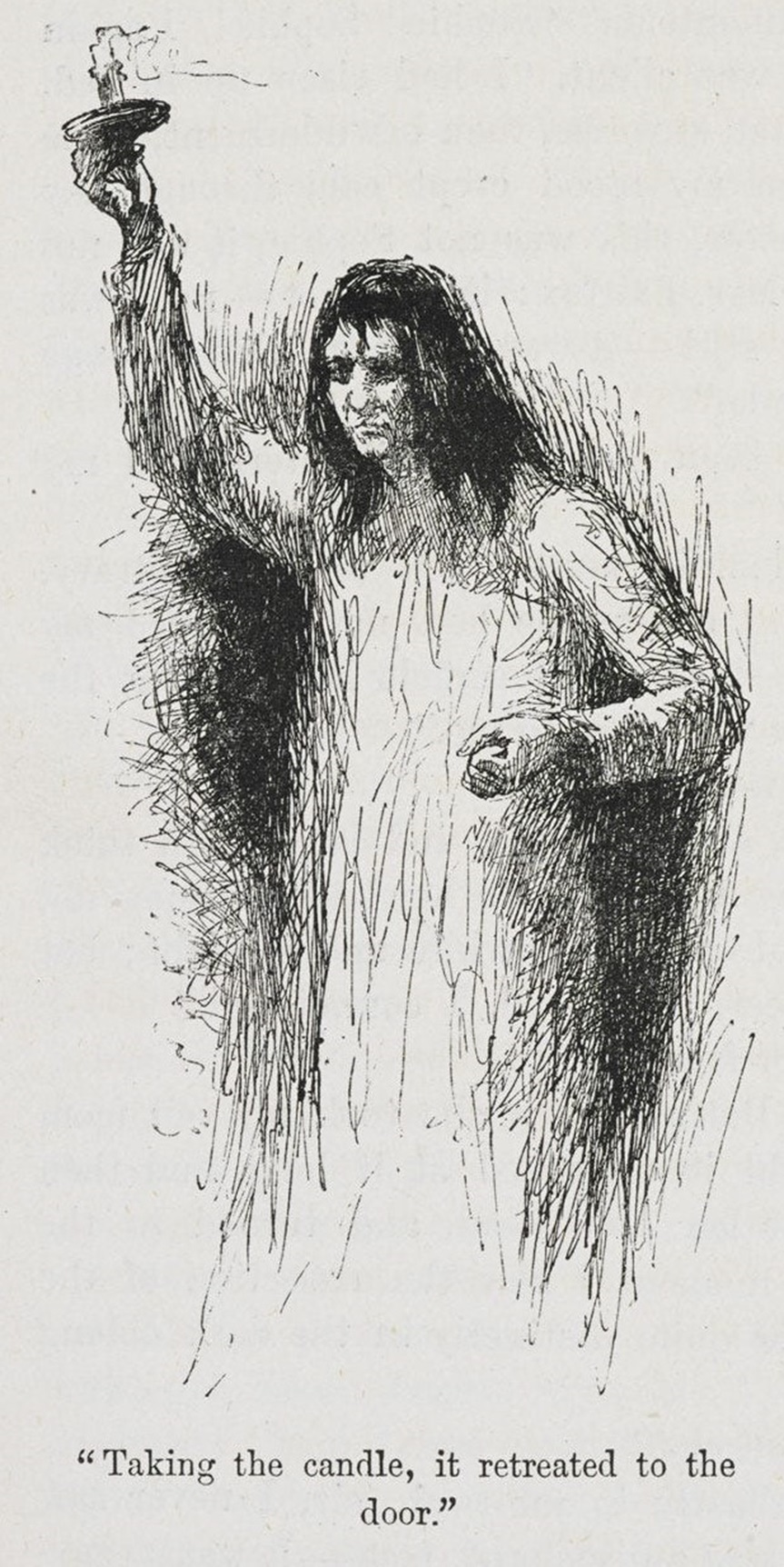
Bertha Mason, illustrated by Edmund H. Garrett

The Gothic genre uses a combination of supernatural features, intense emotions, and a blend of reality and fantasy to create a dark, mysterious atmosphere and experience for characters and readers. Jane Eyre is a homodiegetic narrator, which allows her to exist both as a character and narrator in the story world, and her narration establishes an emotional connection and response for the reader. This intentional narrative technique works in tandem with Gothic features and conventions. Jane and the reader are unaware of the cause behind the "demoniac laugh--low, suppressed, and deep" or "a savage, a sharp, a shrilly sound that ran from end to end of Thornfield Hall," though the reason comes from Bertha Mason. The element of the unknown works in conjunction to the possibility of the supernatural. The intensity of emotions and reactions to Gothic conventions can solely exist in the protagonist's imagination. Instances that a protagonist interprets to be their imagination turns into reality. Jane's experience in the red room represents an aspect of Gothic conventions as Jane feels fear towards being punished in the red room because she believes and imagines that the ghost of her dead uncle haunts the room.

The Gothic genre uses the Gothic double: a literary motif, which is described as the protagonist having a double, alter ego, or doppelgänger interpreted between Jane Eyre and Bertha Mason, where Bertha represents the other side of Jane and vice versa. The commonly used Gothic literary device, foreshadowing, creates an environment filled with tension, ominousity, and dread. After Jane agrees to marry Rochester, a horse-chestnut tree in an orchard is struck by lightning, splitting the tree in half. The lightning strike is ominous and foreshadows Jane and Rochester's separation.

The Gothic genre, in tandem with Patricia Murphy's "New Woman Gothic", establishes an opportunity to go against the Romantic's concept that the antagonist is usually a villainous father. The Gothic genre allows there to be a complex consideration of who or what hinders Jane's happiness. The barriers that Jane experiences, whether related to social class, societal and cultural norms, Bertha Mason, or Rochester, have antagonistic elements.

=== Bildungsroman ===
The Bildungsroman representation in Jane Eyre uses romantic elements that emphasise the journey of one pursuing the discovery of one's identity and knowledge. Jane Eyre desires the thrill and action that comes from being an active individual in society, and she refuses to allow the concept of gender and class to hinder her.

Bildungsroman was primarily viewed through male life progression, but feminist scholars have worked to counteract the male norm of bildungsroman by including female development. Experiences that deem a female narrative to be bildungsroman would be the female protagonist discovering how to manage living in a restrictive society. The novel's setting is the English society of the early 19th century, and with that time setting come specific restrictions women encountered during that time, such as the law of coverture, the lack of rights, and the restricted expectations placed on women. Jane Eyre does not specifically and directly deal with the restrictions of, for example coverture, but her character lives in a society where covertureexists, which inadvertently impacts social and cultural norms and expectations. Progression in the bildungsroman does not necessarily occur in a linear direction. Many narratives that employ bildungsroman do so through the protagonist's development of maturity, which is represented through the protagonist's experiences from childhood to adulthood; this progression is in conjunction with the novel's narrative technique set as an autobiography. Temporally, the beginning of the novel begins with Jane at age ten and ends with Jane at age thirty, but Jane's development of maturity goes beyond her age. For example, Jane's emotional intelligence grows through her friendship with Helen Burns as Jane experiences and processes the loss of her friendship with Helen.

Many times, the 19th-century female bildungsroman can be interpreted as the heroine's growth of self and education in the context of prospective marriage, especially when, in the context of 19th-century womanhood, a wife experiences new knowledge in the private sphere of her role. Jane develops knowledge and experience regarding a romantic journey before her almost marriage to Mr. Rochester; a physical, spiritual, and financial knowledge during her time with St. John; and lastly, with her marriage with Mr. Rochester at the end of the novel. Jane's search for excitement and understanding of life goes beyond her romantic journey. In the text, Jane's childhood beliefs about religion, as seen in her interactions with Mr. Brocklehurt, shift considerably in comparison to her friendship with Helen in Lowood as a child and in her marital and missionary rejection of St. John as an adult woman.

== Themes ==
=== Race ===
Throughout the novel there are frequent themes relating to ideas of ethnicity (specifically that of Bertha), which are a reflection of the society that the novel is set within. Mr Rochester claims to have been forced to take on a "mad" Creole wife, a woman who grew up in the West Indies, and who is thought to be of mixed-race descent. In the analysis of several scholars, Bertha plays the role of the racialised "other" through the shared belief that she chose to follow in the footsteps of her parents. Her apparent mental instability casts her as someone who is incapable of restraining herself, almost forced to submit to the different vices she is a victim of. Many writers of the period believed that one could develop mental instability or mental illnesses simply based on their race.

This means that those who were born of ethnicities associated with a darker complexion, or those who were not fully of European descent, were believed to be more mentally unstable than their white European counterparts were. According to American scholar Susan Meyer, in writing Jane Eyre, Brontë was responding to the "seemingly inevitable" analogy in 19th-century European texts which "[compared] white women with blacks in order to degrade both groups and assert the need for white male control". Bertha serves as an example of both the multiracial population and of a 'clean' European, as she is seemingly able to pass as a white woman for the most part, but also is hinted towards being of an 'impure' race since she does not come from a purely white or European lineage. The title that she is given by others of being a Creole woman leaves her a stranger where she is not black but is also not considered to be white enough to fit into higher society.

Unlike Bertha, Jane Eyre is thought of as being sound of mind before the reader is able to fully understand the character, simply because she is described as having a complexion that is pale and she has grown up in a European society rather than in an "animalistic" setting like Bertha. Jane is favoured heavily from the start of her interactions with Rochester, simply because like Rochester himself, she is deemed to be of a superior ethnic group than that of his first wife. While she still experiences some forms of repression throughout her life (the events of the Lowood Institution) none of them are as heavily taxing on her as that which is experienced by Bertha. Both women go through acts of suppression on behalf of the men in their lives, yet Jane is looked at with favour because of her supposed "beauty" that can be found in the colour of her skin. While both are characterised as falling outside of the normal feminine standards of this time, Jane is thought of as superior to Bertha because she demands respect and is able to use her talents as a governess, whereas Bertha is seen as a creature to be confined in the attic away from "polite" society.

Scholars have also noted the novel's overt references and allusions to slavery, arguably its North American iteration.

==== Wide Sargasso Sea ====
Jean Rhys intended her critically acclaimed novel Wide Sargasso Sea as an account of the woman whom Rochester married and kept in his attic. The book won the notable WH Smith Literary Award in 1967. Rhys explores themes of dominance and dependence, especially in marriage, depicting the mutually painful relationship between a privileged English man and a Creole woman from Dominica made powerless on being duped and coerced by him and others. Both the man and the woman enter marriage under mistaken assumptions about the other partner. Her female lead marries Mr Rochester and deteriorates in England as "The Madwoman in the Attic". Rhys portrays this woman from a quite different perspective from the one in Jane Eyre.

=== Feminism ===
The idea of the equality of men and women emerged more strongly in the Victorian period in Britain, after works by earlier writers, such as Mary Wollstonecraft. R. B. Martin described Jane Eyre as the first major feminist novel, "although there is not a hint in the book of any desire for political, legal, educational, or even intellectual equality between the sexes." This is illustrated in chapter 23, when Jane responds to Rochester's callous and indirect proposal:

Do you think I am an automaton? a machine without feelings?...Do you think, because I am poor, obscure, plain, and little, I am soulless and heartless? You think wrong—I have as much soul as you,—and full as much heart...I am not talking to you now through the medium of custom, conventionalities, nor even of mortal flesh;—it is my spirit that addresses your spirit; just as if both had passed through the grave, and we stood at God's feet, equal,—as we are.

The novel "acted as a catalyst" to feminist criticism with the publication by S. Gilbert and S. Gubar's The Madwoman in the Attic (1979), the title of which alludes to Rochester's wife. The Brontës' fictions were cited by feminist critic Ellen Moers as prime examples of Female Gothic, exploring woman's entrapment within domestic space and subjection to patriarchal authority, and the transgressive and dangerous attempts to subvert and escape such restriction. Both Wuthering Heights and Jane Eyre explore this theme.

=== Social class ===
Throughout the novel, Jane undergoes various social class transitions, in response to her life's varying situations. As a child, she mixes with middle class people through the Reed family, though Jane is not at the same level of social class as the rest of the Reed family. While at Lowood, she experiences the life of children whose guardians can afford the school fees of "fifteen pounds per year" but nonetheless are "charity children" "because fifteen pounds is not enough for board and teaching", living in poor conditions, and later working there as an adult as a teacher on a salary of fifteen pounds. She has an opportunity to be a private governess, and in so doing double her salary, but her governess position makes her aware of her ambiguous social position as a governess to a child with a wealthy guardian. After Jane leaves Thornfield Hall, she is stripped of her class identity as she travels across the moors and arrives at Moor House. But Jane receives an inheritance which she shares with her new-found family, and this offers a different form of independence.
