= Robert Serpell =

English-born Zambian psychologist (born 1944)

- Born: Robert Nicholas Serpell; 1944 (age 81–82); England
- Citizenship: Zambian
- Occupation: Professor of Psychology
- Employer: University of Zambia
- Spouse: Namposya Nampanya Serpell (m. 1973)
- Children: Five, incl. Zewelanji Serpell, Namwali Serpell

Robert Nicholas Serpell (born 1944 in England) is a Zambian citizen and professor of psychology at the University of Zambia. From 2003 to 2006 he was vice-chancellor of the said university. He also served from 2018 to 2025 as Chancellor of Eden University in Lusaka, Zambia.

He has conducted numerous studies on intelligence, literacy and child development in social and cultural context, finding that even within a given society, different cognitive characteristics are emphasized from one situation to another and from one subculture to another. These differences extend not just to conceptions of intelligence but to what is considered adaptive or appropriate in a broader sense. Serpell's work shows how conceptions of intelligence vary from culture to culture, and that the majority of these views do not reflect Western ideas.

Serpell and colleagues discovered that people in some African cultures, particularly those where Western schooling is not yet popular, prefer to emphasise the relationship between intellect and social ability. In Zambia's rural Katete District, for instance, the concept of nzelu includes both cleverness (chenjela) and responsibility (tumikila).

In 2017, Serpell received an award from the Society for Research in Child Development (SRCD) for "Distinguished Contributions to Understanding International, Cultural and Contextual Diversity in Child Development".

In 2025, Serpell received a Lifetime Research Achievement Award from the University of Zambia "in honour of a distinguised career marked by sustained and outstanding contributions to research and knowledge generation".

His research and publications extend into the fields of education for children with special needs, early childhood education and parenting, and educational policy, with special attention to the African region.

== Personal life ==
Serpell was born in England in 1944. In 1973, he married Namposya Nampanya Serpell, an economist. Together they had or adopted five children, including Zewelanji Serpell and Namwali Serpell. The family usually resided in Lusaka, Zambia, but spent 12 years in Baltimore, Maryland, USA, from 1989 to 2002. Details of Serpell's personal life, linked to his publications, are presented in a memoir published in 2024.

== Selected publications ==
- Serpell, R. (1977) "Estimates of intelligence in a rural community of eastern Zambia". In F. M. Okatcha (ed.), Modern psychology and cultural adaptation (pp. 179–216). Nairobi: Swahili Language Consultants and Publishers.
- Serpell, R. (1979). "How specific are perceptual skills? A cross-cultural study of pattern reproduction". British Journal of Psychology, 70, 365–380.
- Serpell, R. (1980). "Linguistic flexibility in urban Zambian children." Annals of the New York Academy of Sciences, 345, 97–119.
- Serpell, R. (1993). The Significance of Schooling: Life-journeys in an African Society. Cambridge, UK: Cambridge University Press.
- Serpell, R. (2000). "Intelligence and culture". In R. J. Sternberg (ed.), The Handbook of Intelligence (pp. 549–577). Cambridge, UK & New York, US: Cambridge University Press.
- Serpell, R., Baker, L., & Sonnenschein, S. (2005). Becoming literate in the city: the Baltimore Early Childhood Project. New York, NY: Cambridge University Press.
- Serpell, R. (2011). "Social responsibility as a dimension of intelligence, and as an educational goal: insights from programmatic research in an African society". Child Development Perspectives, 5 (2), 126–133.
- Serpell, R., & Jere-Folotiya, J. (2011). "Basic Education for Children with Special Needs in Zambia: Progress and Challenges in the Translation of Policy into Practice". Psychology and Developing Societies, 23(2) 211–245.
- Serpell, R. Mumba, P. and Chansa-Kabali, T. (2011). "Early Educational Foundations for the Development of Civic Responsibility: an African Experience." In C. A. Flanagan and B. D. Christens (eds), ' 'Youth civic development: work at the cutting edge. New Directions for Child and Adolescent Development, 134, 77–93.
- Serpell, R., & Marfo, K. (eds) (2014). "Child Development in Africa: Views from Inside". New Directions for Child and Adolescent Development, Volume 2014, Issue 146.
- Serpell, R., & Nsamenang, A. B. (2015). "The challenge of local relevance: using the wealth of African cultures in ECCE programme development". In Marope, P. T. M., & Kaga, Y. (eds). Investing against Evidence: the Global State of Early Childhood Care and Education (pp. 231–247). Paris: UNESCO.
- Serpell, R. (2020). "Literacy and Child Development in a Contemporary African Society". Child Development Perspectives, 14(2), 90–96.
- Serpell, R. (2021). "Culture-sensitive communication in applied developmental research". Human Development, 64(4–6), 222–237.
- Serpell, R. (2024). In search of integrity: a life-journey across diverse contexts. New York, NY: Cambridge University Press.
