= Reader, I Married Him =

2016 short story anthology edited by Tracy Chevalier

Reader, I Married Him: Stories Inspired by Jane Eyre
- Cover of 2016 UK hardback
- Editor: Tracy Chevalier
- Genre: Short story collection
- Publisher: The Borough Press
- Publication date: 2016
- ISBN: 978-0008150570

Reader, I Married Him: Stories Inspired by Jane Eyre is a 2016 anthology of short stories, edited by Tracy Chevalier, inspired by the line "Reader, I married him" from Jane Eyre by Charlotte Brontë, at the beginning of Chapter 38. It was commissioned to mark the 200th anniversary of the author's birth, and is published by The Borough Press, an imprint of HarperCollins.

== Authors ==
The authors of the stories are all women:

- Joanna Briscoe
- Tracy Chevalier
- Emma Donoghue
- Helen Dunmore
- Esther Freud
- Jane Gardam
- Linda Grant
- Kirsty Gunn
- Tessa Hadley
- Sarah Hall
- Susan Hill
- Elizabeth McCracken
- Nadifa Mohamed
- Audrey Niffenegger
- Patricia Park
- Francine Prose
- Namwali Serpell
- Elif Shafak
- Lionel Shriver
- Salley Vickers
- Evie Wyld
