= Namwali Serpell =

Zambian feminist academic and writer (born 1980)

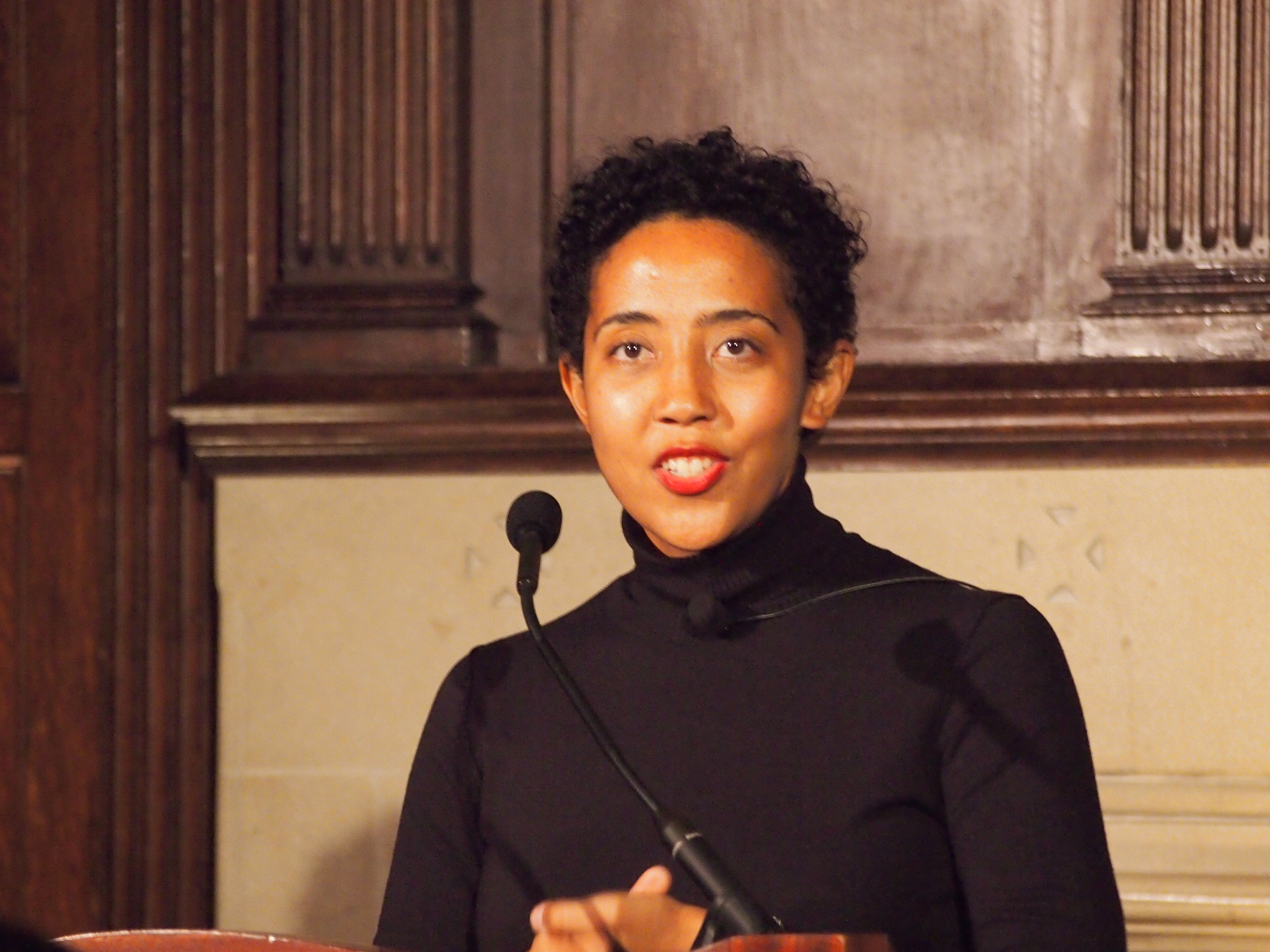
- Born: Namwali Serpell; 1980 (age 45–46); Lusaka, Zambia
- Citizenship: American
- Education: Yale University (BA); Harvard University (PhD)
- Occupations: Novelist and academic
- Parent(s): Robert Serpell and Namposya Nampanya Serpell
- Writing career
- Genres: Short story, novel
- Notable works: "The Sack" (2014); The Old Drift (2019); On Morrison (2026)
- Notable awards: Caine Prize for African Writing; Rona Jaffe Foundation Writers' Award; Windham–Campbell Literature Prize; Anisfield-Wolf Book Award; GPLA 2019, Belles-Lettres Category; Arthur C. Clarke Award
- Website: www.namwaliserpell.com

Namwali Serpell (born 1980) is an American and Zambian writer who teaches in the United States. In April 2014, she was named on Hay Festival's Africa39 list of 39 sub-Saharan African writers aged under 40 with the potential and talent to define trends in African literature. Her short story "The Sack" won the 2015 Caine Prize for African fiction in English. In 2020, Serpell won the Belles-lettres category Grand Prix of Literary Associations 2019 for her debut novel The Old Drift.

== Biography ==
=== Early years and education ===
Serpell was born in 1980 in Lusaka, Zambia, to Robert Serpell and his wife, Namposya Nampanya Serpell. Her British-Zambian father is a professor of psychology at the University of Zambia, and her mother was an economist. When Namwali was nine, her family moved to Baltimore, Maryland, in the United States, where she was educated. She completed her undergraduate degree in literature at Yale and her doctorate (PhD) in American and British literature at Harvard. Serpell became an American citizen in 2017.

=== Career ===
Serpell is a professor of English at Harvard University. From 2008 to 2020, she was a professor of English at University of California, Berkeley. She resides in the United States and visits Lusaka annually.

Serpell's short story "Muzungu" was shortlisted in 2010 for the Caine Prize, an annual award for African short fiction in English. In 2011, she received the Rona Jaffe Foundation Writers' Award, a prize for beginning women writers. Her story "The Sack" won the Caine Prize in 2015. Saying "fiction is not a competitive sport", Serpell announced she would share the $15,000 prize with the other shortlisted writers, Masande Ntshanga, F. T. Kola, Elnathan John, and Segun Afolabi. Serpell was the first Caine winner from Zambia. The "sack" of the title, according to Serpell, derives from a terrifying dream she had at 17, "and I didn't know if I was on the inside or the outside". It also has political implications: "I was studying American and British fiction, and [another graduate student] was studying African contemporary fiction, and her theory was that any time you saw a sack in African literature, it was a hidden reference to the transatlantic slave trade. I was kind of writing my story against that."

In 2014, Serpell published Seven Modes of Uncertainty, a critical work that examines "the relationship between literature's capacity to unsettle, perplex, and bewilder us, and literature's ethical value". The journal Novel: A Forum on Fiction called the book "a bravura performance".

Serpell is a contributor to the 2019 anthology New Daughters of Africa, edited by Margaret Busby. Serpell's "On Black Difficulty: Toni Morrison and the Thrill of Imperiousness" won the 2019 Brittle Paper Award for Essays & Think Pieces.

Serpell's debut novel, The Old Drift, was published in 2019. Reviewing it in The Guardian, novelist Nadifa Mohamed wrote: "Namwali Serpell’s first novel is a rambunctious epic that traces the intertwined histories of three families over three generations. ...Serpell is an ambitious and talented writer, with the chutzpah to work on a huge canvas." The Observer's review concluded: "By the end, set in a near future involving a new digital device embedded in the user's skin, we realise how slyly Serpell is testing our assumptions, before a cunning last-minute swerve forces us to question why we don't consider science fiction a viable mode for the great African novel."

In The Old Drift, Serpell experiments with different forms of narrative in order to help readers view the story from different viewpoints. NPR's Annalisa Quinn called Serpell's narrative style "florid, but the excess often comes with a point. These are indeed three ways humans think about space: As something legible and predictive, as a resource to exploit, and as a source of beauty and awe. You also get the sense that the descriptive excess is a conscious choice".

In March 2020, Serpell was one of eight writers to win a Windham–Campbell Literature Prize, one of the world's richest literary prizes, awarded annually, with each winner receiving $165,000. She was honored for fiction. The other winners were Yiyun Li, Maria Tumarkin, and Anne Boyer for nonfiction; Bhanu Kapil and Jonah Mixon-Webster for poetry; and Julia Cho and Aleshea Harris for drama. Serpell said, "I'm absolutely thrilled to receive this award and honored to join the company of these esteemed writers. The Windham-Campbell Prize has proven unique in celebrating writing in Africa based solely on its literary achievement; it's deeply gratifying to be taken seriously as an artist."

Serpell won the 2020 Anisfield-Wolf Book Award in the Fiction category for The Old Drift. On 23 September 2020, it was announced that The Old Drift had also won the Arthur C. Clarke Award, the UK's top prize for science fiction. Serpell responded on Twitter on 25 September that she had received news of the award "within an hour of hearing that the cops who killed Breonna Taylor weren't charged. To honor Breonna and the ongoing fight against state-sanctioned violence, I'm donating the £2020 prize money to bail funds for protestors. Join me", explaining the reason for her show of solidarity in a BBC interview: "I've been trying to figure out how to acknowledge both the honor that this award grants to my novel and the feeling that the political revolution I'm describing in the novel is yet to come…My novel is not exactly prophetic. It is just resonant with the questions and issues that have been with me as part of the culture that has formed me. And that culture, I want to say, is one where science fiction is a force that lets us probe real urgent political questions about equality and power and justice."

Serpell was inspired by the work of Toni Morrison, and has written about and taught courses on Morrison's work at Harvard. Sepell's book analyzing the author's works, On Morrison, was published in February 2026, when a review by Laila Lalami in The Guardian stated: "Serpell has managed to deliver a book that works on many levels: as a study of craft, as a critical appraisal, and as a tribute to an artist who was difficult in all the right ways." Douglas Field stated in The Times Literary Supplement: "On Morrison provides deft readings of the writer's major works, along with her less familiar plays and poetry, while addressing how the challenge of her writing is sometimes overstated by those who confuse complexity with obscurity."

== Awards and honors ==
In 2019, The Old Drift was included on The New York Times Book Review's "100 Notable Books" list and TIME's "100 Must-Read Books of the Year" list.

Serpell's second novel, The Furrows, published in 2022, was a finalist for the National Book Critics Circle Award for Fiction and longlisted for the Joyce Carol Oates Literary Prize. Publishers Weekly named The Furrows in their list of the top ten books of the year in any genre. It was selected for The New York Times's "10 Best Books of 2022" list. Vulture also named The Furrows as one of its best books of 2022.

In April 2026, Serpell was awarded the 2026 Guggenheim Fellowship in Fiction.

Awards for Serpell's writing
Year	Title	Award	Category	Result	Ref.
2010	"Muzungu"	Caine Prize for African Writing	—	Shortlisted	
2011	—	Rona Jaffe Foundation Writers' Award	Fiction	Won	
2015	"The Sack"	Caine Prize for African Writing	—	Won	
2019	"On Black Difficulty"	Brittle Paper Award for Essays & Think Pieces	—	Won	
2019	The Old Drift	Center for Fiction First Novel Prize	—	Longlisted	
2019	The Old Drift	Los Angeles Times Book Prize	Art Seidenbaum Award	Won	
2019	The Old Drift	Los Angeles Times Book Prize	Ray Bradbury Prize	Shortlisted	
2020	The Old Drift	Anisfield-Wolf Book Award	—	Won	
2020	The Old Drift	Arthur C. Clarke Award	—	Won	
2020	The Old Drift	Grand Prix of Literary Associations: Belles-Lettres	—	Won	
2020	The Old Drift	Windham–Campbell Literature Prize	Fiction	Won	
2020	Stranger Faces	National Book Critics Circle Award	Criticism	Shortlisted	
2020	"Take It"	Sunday Times Short Story Award	—	Shortlisted	
2022	The Furrows	National Book Critics Circle Award	Fiction	Shortlisted	
2023	The Furrows	Carol Shields Prize for Fiction	—	Longlisted	
2023	The Furrows	Joyce Carol Oates Literary Prize	—	Longlisted	

== Bibliography ==
=== Novels ===
- —— (2019). The Old Drift. Hogarth Press. ISBN 9781101907146.
- —— (2022). The Furrows. Hogarth Press. ISBN 9780593448915.

=== Short stories ===
- —— (2010). "Muzungu". A Life in Full and Other Stories: The Caine Prize for African Writing 2010. New Internationalist. pp. 31–47. ISBN 9781906523374.
- —— (2014). "The Sack" ( (PDF)). In Wakatama Allfrey, Ellah (ed.). Africa 39: New Writing from Africa South of the Sahara. Bloomsbury Publishing. pp. 288–297. ISBN 9781408869024. Archived from the original on 14 July 2015.
- —— (2016). "Account". Enkare Review.
- —— (2016). "Double Men". Reader, I Married Him. HarperCollins. ISBN 9780008173500.

=== Nonfiction ===
- —— (2008). The Ethics of Uncertainty: Reading Twentieth-century American Literature (phD dissertation). Harvard University.
- —— (2014). Seven Modes of Uncertainty. Harvard University Press. ISBN 9780674729094.
- —— (2020). Stranger Faces. Transit Books. ISBN 9781945492433.
- —— (1 December 2020). "Unbothered: The grace of black nonchalance". The Yale Review.
- —— (27 September 2021). "Race Off | The fantasy of race transformation". The Yale Review.
- —— (2026). On Morrison. Hogarth. ISBN 9780593732915.
