= The Furrows =

2022 novel by Namwali Serpell

- Author: Namwali Serpell
- Audio read by: Kristen Ariza, Ryan Vincent Anderson, and Dion Graham
- Language: English
- Genre: Literary fiction
- Publisher: Hogarth Press
- Publication date: September 27, 2022
- Publication place: United States
- Media type: Print (hardcover)
- Pages: 288 pp.
- ISBN: 9780593448915 (hardcover 1st ed.)

The Furrows is a 2022 novel by Namwali Serpell, an American and Zambian author.

== Plot ==
The Furrows follows the story of Cassandra Williams, also known as Cee, whose mother is a white painter, and her father is a Black academic. When Cee was twelve years old, she went swimming in the ocean with her younger brother, Wayne, who was only seven at the time. Unfortunately, as a storm suddenly intensified, Wayne mysteriously vanished, and Cee finds herself burdened with the blame for his apparent death. This tragic event shatters their family, leading to their parents' divorce.

Cee grows up in the suburbs of Baltimore, haunted by a lifetime of trauma stemming from her brother's disappearance. To cope with her pain, she seeks solace in elite therapy. As she navigates her adult life, Cee encounters men who bear a striking resemblance to Wayne. In fact, some of them even share his name. One of these men becomes romantically involved with Cee, adding further complexity to her already tangled emotions.

Within the narrative of The Furrows, timelines begin to blur, creating a sense of collapsing realities. The world itself appears to be in a state of disarray, with hints of an impending apocalypse permeating the story. These elements add to the overall atmosphere of uncertainty and unsettlement present throughout the novel.

== Critical reception ==
=== Los Angeles Times ===
"If The Old Drift put Serpell in conversation with Rushdie and García Márquez, The Furrows seems to stand on the shoulders of Virginia Woolf and Toni Morrison. Above all, Serpell is working with a confidence in and commitment to her project and to the story form. She understands what it is to always have hold of the reader. She does not pander or explain. Instead, the genius is in the book's bones, its DNA. There is a sort of palimpsest of thinking, reading: The ideas have been churning in the writer for years, but the agony of that work is nowhere to be found. Instead, Serpell gives exactly what she tells us at the outset, a stunningly acute depiction of how the endless layers of both grief and absence, the impossibly slippery act of trying to be a person, feel."

=== London Review of Books ===
"Namwali Serpell's highly accomplished, highly deceptive novel The Furrows starts with the trauma of childhood grief. Its subtitle – 'An Elegy' – invokes the literary genre that most strongly addresses a single emotion. This theme is inhabited and then abruptly undermined."

=== Financial Times ===
"It is in dwelling on the aftermath, and not the accident itself, that The Furrows comes alive — shifting and undoing our understanding of grief. "What hand has reached in and turned the world over?" Cee wonders towards the end of the novel. In telling this story, Serpell too has reached in and turned the world over."

=== The New Yorker ===
"Serpell reminds us on every page that nothing is less reliable than language—that every story is necessarily a betrayal. I don't want to tell you what happened. The result is a novel that reclaims and refashions the genre of the elegy, charging it with as much eros as pathos. Furrows are the tracks we make and the tracks we cover up, and the shifting ground of Serpell's novel denies every certainty save that the furrows are where we all live."

=== The Atlantic ===
"In The Furrows, Serpell code-switches with ease, an ultimately crucial skill in a story that abounds with fluctuating realities. The book swerves from a realistic chronicle that bears all the markers of a grief tale to one that seems infused with magic, from standard-English dialogue to a pitch-perfect rendering of African American Vernacular English. Serpell also references and builds upon pop culture's alternate-reality obsession, and the narrative vertigo that these stories induce in us. When I began reading the novel, I knew that Wayne had drowned in the ocean—but the power of Serpell's storytelling was such that as the narrative progressed, I stopped being so sure."

== Award ==
One of the New York Times' Ten Best Books of the Year

Year	Award	Category	Result	Ref.
2022	National Book Critics Circle Award	Fiction	Shortlisted	
2023	Carol Shields Prize for Fiction	—	Longlisted	
2023	Joyce Carol Oates Literary Prize	—	Longlisted	
