= Tracy Chevalier =

American-British novelist (born 1962)

Tracy Chevalier FRSL
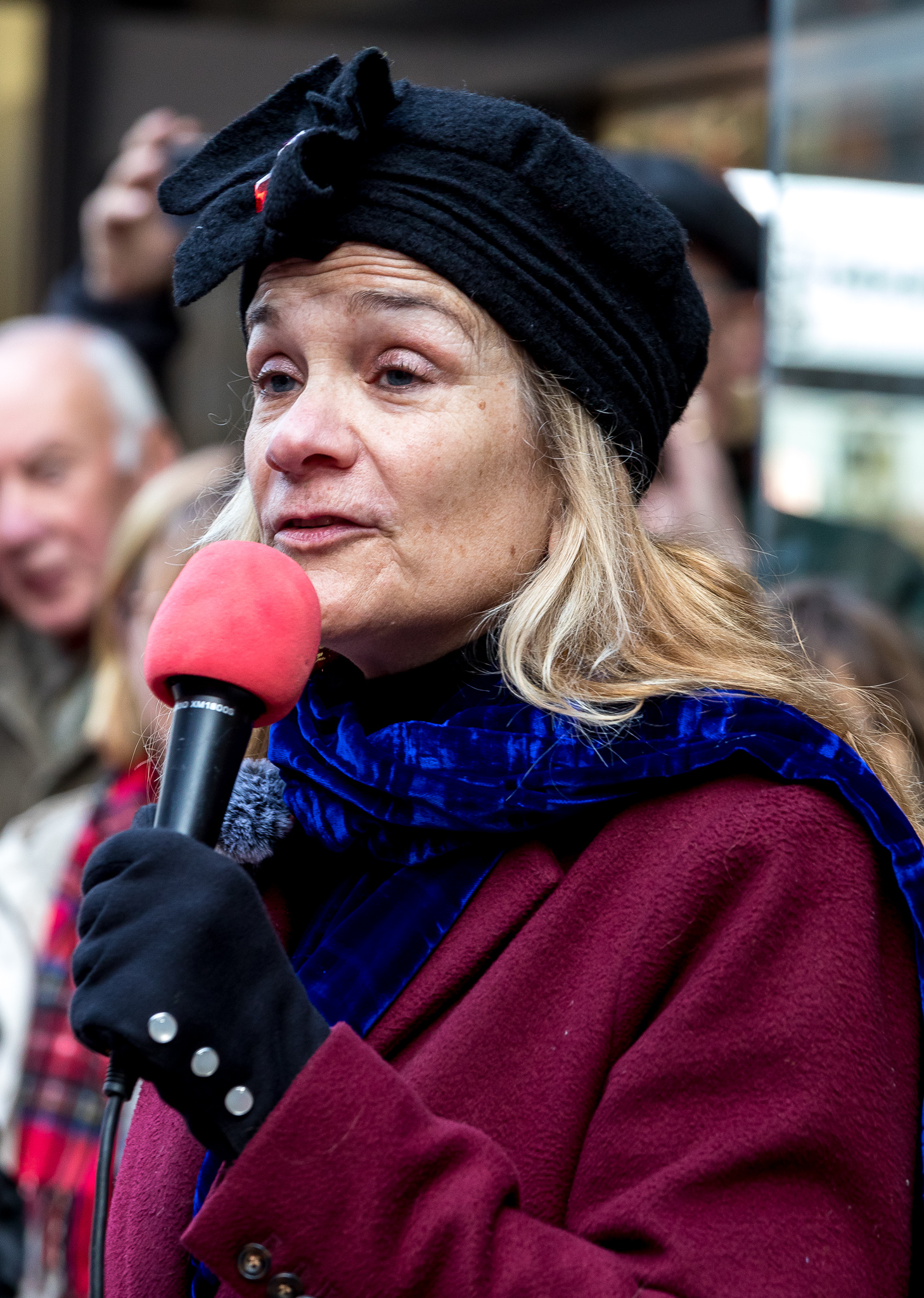
- Chevalier in 2025 by Helen Jones
- Born: Tracy Rose Chevalier; 19 October 1962 (age 63); Washington, D.C., U.S.
- Citizenship: American / British
- Education: Oberlin College (BA); University of East Anglia (MA)
- Occupation: Writer
- Spouse: Jonathan Drori
- Children: 1 son
- Writing career
- Language: English
- Genre: Historical fiction
- Notable work: Girl with a Pearl Earring (1999)
- Website: tchevalier.com

Tracy Rose Chevalier (born 19 October 1962) is an American-British novelist. She is best known for her second novel, Girl with a Pearl Earring, which was adapted as a 2003 film starring Scarlett Johansson and Colin Firth.

== Personal background ==
Chevalier was born on 19 October 1962, in Washington, D.C. She is the daughter of Douglas and Helen (née Werner) Chevalier. Her father was a photographer who worked with The Washington Post for more than 30 years. Chevalier has a sister and a brother. As of 2022, Chevalier lives in London with her husband, Jonathan Drori.

She graduated from Bethesda-Chevy Chase High School in Bethesda, Maryland, in 1980. After receiving her bachelor's degree in English from Oberlin College in 1984, she moved to England, where she began working in publishing. In 1993, she began studying Creative Writing, earning a master's degree from the University of East Anglia. Her tutors included novelists Malcolm Bradbury and Rose Tremain.

== Professional background ==
Following her graduation from Oberlin College, Chevalier moved to England, where she began working as an editorial assistant with Macmillan's Dictionary of Art, then later joined St. James Press, serving as a reference book editor.

Her first novel, The Virgin Blue, was published in the UK in 1997 and was chosen by W H Smith for their showcase of new authors. Her second novel, Girl with a Pearl Earring, was published in 1999. The work, which was based on the famous painting by Vermeer, has been translated into 38 languages. As of 2014, it has sold over five million copies worldwide. It won the Barnes & Noble Discover Award in 2000. In 2003, a film based on the novel was released, receiving three Academy Award nominations in 2004, along with ten BAFTAs and two Golden Globes. Her 2013 novel, The Last Runaway, was honored with the Ohioana Book Award and was chosen for the Richard and Judy Book Club for autumn 2013.

In 2011, Chevalier edited and contributed to Why Willows Weep, a collection of short stories by 19 authors, the sale of which raised money for the Woodland Trust, for which her husband served as a trustee.

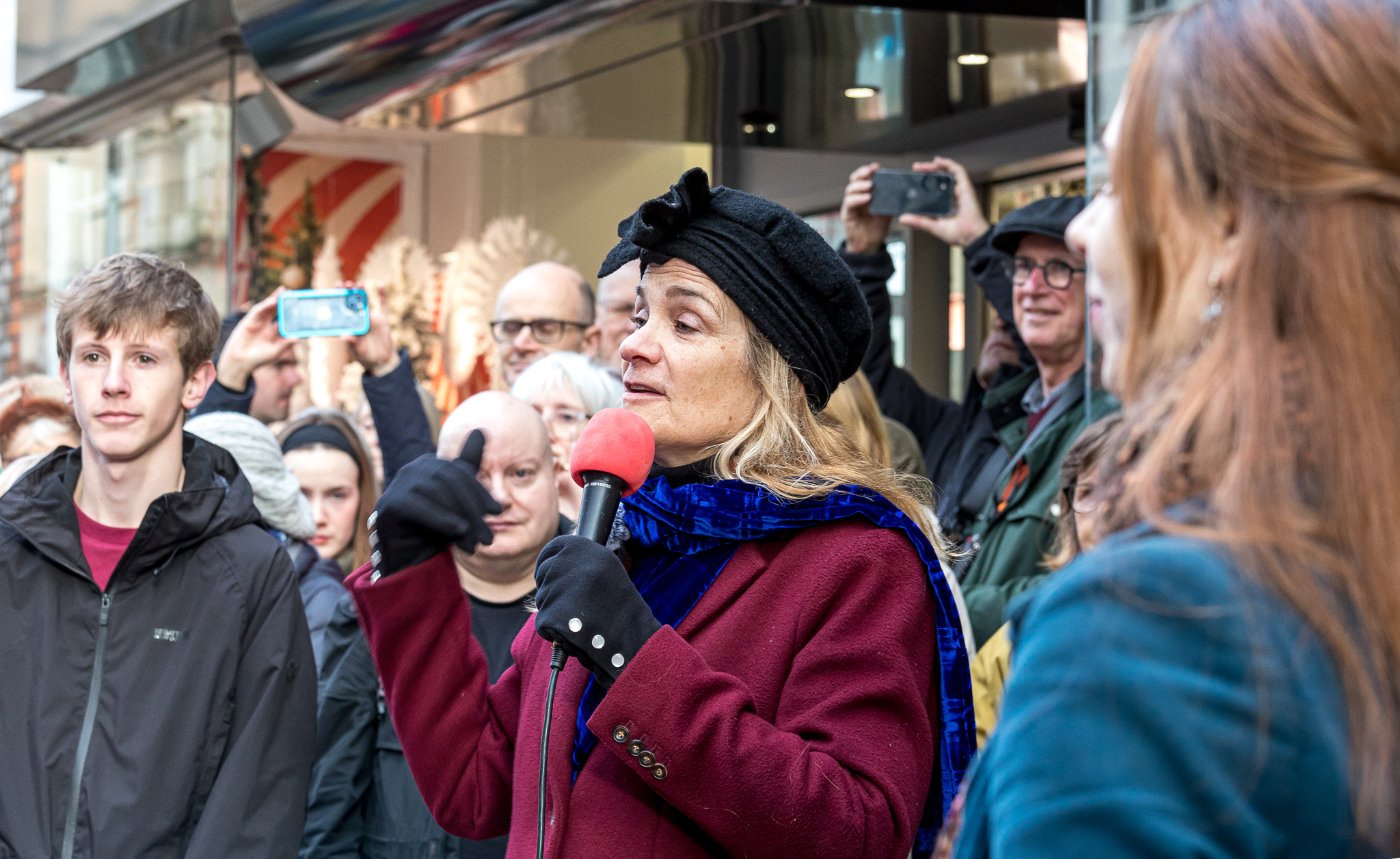
Tracy Chevalier at the unveiling of the Sylvia Townsend Warner statue in Dorchester in 2025

In 2025 she was a literary guest at the unveiling of a statue of Sylvia Townsend Warner in Dorchester in December 2025.

Other of her works that feature historical figures as characters include William Lobb and Johnny Appleseed in At the Edge of the Orchard, and William Blake in Burning Bright, and Louisa Pesel in A Single Thread.

== Memberships ==
Chevalier has been involved in representing authors as a member of various community organizations. In 2004, she began serving as the chairperson for the Management Committee for the UK's Society of Authors, serving in that capacity for four years. Girl with a Pearl Earring was chosen as one of the books given away in both the US and UK for World Book Night 2013. In 2015, she joined the British Library board as a Trustee. She is also an ambassador for the Woodland Trust, where her husband serves as a member of the board of directors.

== Honors and awards ==
- 1997: WH Smith Fresh Talent for The Virgin Blue
- 2000: Barnes & Noble Discover Award for Girl with a Pearl Earring
- 2008: Fellow, Royal Society of Literature
- 2013: Ohioana Book Award, for The Last Runaway
- 2013: Richard and Judy Book Club book for The Last Runaway
- 2013: Honorary Doctorate, Oberlin College and University of East Anglia

== Works ==
- The Virgin Blue (1997) ISBN 978-0452284449
- Girl with a Pearl Earring (1999) ISBN 978-0525945277
- Falling Angels (2001) ISBN 978-0525945819
- The Lady and the Unicorn (2003) ISBN 978-0007140909
- Burning Bright (2007) ISBN 978-0007245130
- Remarkable Creatures (2009) ISBN 978-0007178377
- The Last Runaway (2013) ISBN 978-0525952992
- At the Edge of the Orchard (2016) ISBN 978-0007350407
- New Boy (2017) ISBN 978-0553447637
- A Single Thread (2019) ISBN 978-0008153816
- The Glassmaker (2024) ISBN 978-0525558279

As editor

- Twentieth-Century Children's Writers, 3rd edition, St. James Press, 1989, ISBN 0912289953, LCCN 90-171621
- Reader, I Married Him: Stories Inspired by Jane Eyre, 2016, ISBN 978-0008150570

== See also ==
- Mary Anning and Elizabeth Philpot – main protagonists and first-person narrators of Chevalier's biographical novel Remarkable Creatures (2009)
