= The Old Drift =

2019 novel by Namwali Serpell

- First edition
- Author: Namwali Serpell
- Language: English
- Genre: Historical fiction, Science fiction
- Set in: Northern Rhodesia, Zambia 1903 - 2023
- Publisher: Hogarth Press
- Publication date: March 21, 2019
- Publication place: Zambia
- Media type: Print (hardcover and paperback), audiobook, e-book
- Pages: 576
- Awards: 2020 Arthur C. Clarke Award 2020 Anisfield-Wolf Book Award
- ISBN: 9781101907146

The Old Drift is a 2019 historical fiction and science fiction novel by Zambian author Namwali Serpell. Set in Northern Rhodesia/Zambia, it is Serpell's debut novel and follows the lives of three interwoven families in three generations. It won the 2020 Anisfield-Wolf Book Award as well as the Arthur C. Clarke Award.

== Plot ==
The novel is a saga that follows three families living in Zambia across three generations. These families are intertwined by the actions of the novel's first narrator, Percy M. Clark, who is based on a real man from Cambridge, England, who moved to Zambia (then Northern Rhodesia) in the early 20th century as one of Europe's many colonists across the African continent. In the novel's first chapter, Percy details some of his encounters as an early settler in The Old Drift, a settlement near Victoria Falls. He details the settlement's changing name, its growing population, and his racist views of the native Zambians. On one such occasion, Percy's actions at a bar one night cause a young girl to strike a young Zambian boy so hard that "he became an imbecile, forever smiling at the daisies," as Percy says. This Zambian boy reappears when Percy accidentally shoots him one day, and later learns that his name is N'gulube. This series of events is the cause behind the intertwining of the families, which is slowly revealed through the rest of the novel as Serpell details the lives of the family members on the family tree: the Grandmothers (Sibilla, Agnes, and Matha), the Mothers (Sylvia, Isabella, and Thandiwe), and their Children (Joseph, Jacob, and Naila).

== Reception ==
Reviewing it in The Guardian, Nadifa Mohamed wrote: "Namwali Serpell’s first novel is a rambunctious epic that traces the intertwined histories of three families over three generations. …Serpell is an ambitious and talented writer, with the chutzpah to work on a huge canvas." The Observer's review concluded, "By the end, set in a near future involving a new digital device embedded in the user’s skin, we realise how slyly Serpell is testing our assumptions, before a cunning last-minute swerve forces us to question why we don’t consider science fiction a viable mode for the great African novel."

In The Old Drift, Serpell experiments with different forms of narrative in order to help readers view the story from different viewpoints. NPR's Annalisa Quinn called Serpell's narrative style "florid, but the excess often comes with a point. These are indeed three ways humans think about space: As something legible and predictive, as a resource to exploit, and as a source of beauty and awe. You also get the sense that the descriptive excess is a conscious choice".

Writing for The New York Times, Dwight Garner praised the debut, saying "The reader who picks up The Old Drift is likely to be more than simply impressed. This is a dazzling book, as ambitious as any first novel published this decade. It made the skin on the back of my neck prickle."

== Awards ==
Year	Award	Category	Result	Ref.
2019	Center for Fiction First Novel Prize	—	Longlisted	
2019	Los Angeles Times Book Prize	Art Seidenbaum Award	Won	
2019	Los Angeles Times Book Prize	Ray Bradbury Prize	Shortlisted	
2020	Anisfield-Wolf Book Award	—	Won	
2020	Arthur C. Clarke Award	—	Won	
2020	Grand Prix of Literary Associations: Belles-Lettres	—	Won	
2020	Windham–Campbell Literature Prize	Fiction	Won	
