= Jonathan Drori =

British author, environmentalist, former BBC producer

Jonathan Drori is a British author, environmentalist, and former BBC executive producer.

== Books ==
- The Stuff that Stuff Is Made Of: The Things We Make With Plants (2025)
- Around the World in 80 Plants (2021)
- Around the World in 80 Trees (2018)
