= Zewelanji Serpell =

American developmental psychologist

- Occupation: Developmental Psychologist

Academic background
- Education: Clark University, Howard University

Academic work
- Institutions: Virginia Commonwealth University

Zewelanji Natashya Serpell (born 1974) is an American developmental psychologist whose scholarship examines the learning experiences of African American students in school and school-based interventions targeting executive functions.

In 2017-2018, she was appointed as Education Policy Fellow for the American Education Research Association Congressional Fellowship Program. She was on the United States House Committee on Education and the Workforce, working to craft legislation on higher education related issues, including Historically Black colleges and universities (HBCUs) and institutional accountability on accreditation. In 2019, Serpell received the Dalmas A. Taylor Distinguished Contributions Award, as part of the American Psychological Association Minority Fellowship Program.

== Biography ==
Serpell holds a Bachelor in Arts in psychology from Clark University. She received her Masters in Science, and later doctorate in developmental psychology at Howard University in Washington, D.C. in 2002. Her dissertation, titled Ethnicity and tool type as they relate to problem-solving, transfer and proxemic behavior in a communal learning context, was conducted under the supervision of A. Wade Boykin.

Serpell was an associate professor and former Director of Graduate Studies at Virginia Commonwealth University. Prior to this, she was an associate professor at Virginia State University. Before Virginia State, Serpell served on the faculty and as the associate director of the Alvin V Baird Attention and Learning Disabilities Center at James Madison University.

== Research ==
Serpell’s research focuses on understanding the sociocultural processes that influence the cognitive development and learning experiences of African American students in the school environment. Her work centers on the development of school-based interventions to improve executive functioning and academic achievement. She also utilizes developmental science research for policy interventions. Her research has been funded through the Institute for Education Sciences, and the National Science Foundation.

== Books ==
- Clauss-Ehlers, C. S., Serpell, Z. N., & Weist, M. D. (Eds.). (2013). Handbook of culturally responsive school mental health: Advancing research, training, practice, and policy. Springer.
- Evans, S., Weist, M., & Serpell, Z. (Eds.) (2007). Advances in school-based mental health interventions. Civic Research Institute.

== Selected publications ==
- Serpell, Zewelanji N. (2 January 2020). "Supporting the integration of evidence into federal educational policy and reform efforts: A navigational framework for educational researchers". Educational Psychologist. 55 (1): 40–48. doi:10.1080/00461520.2019.1700798. S2CID 213828956.
- Serpell, Zewelanji N.; Boykin, A. Wade; Madhere, Serge; Nasim, Aashir (November 2006). "The Significance of Contextual Factors in African American Students' Transfer of Learning". Journal of Black Psychology. 32 (4): 418–441. doi:10.1177/0095798406292466. S2CID 144784574.
- Serpell, Zewelanji N.; Esposito, Alena G. (October 2016). "Development of Executive Functions: Implications for Educational Policy and Practice". Policy Insights from the Behavioral and Brain Sciences. 3 (2): 203–210. doi:10.1177/2372732216654718. S2CID 147829346.
- Serpell, Zewelanji; Hayling, Charlayne C.; Stevenson, Howard; Kern, Lee (2009). "Cultural Considerations in the Development of School-Based Interventions for African American Adolescent Boys with Emotional and Behavioral Disorders". The Journal of Negro Education. 78 (3): 321–332. JSTOR 25608749.
- Serpell, Zewelanji N.; Mashburn, Andrew J. (February 2012). "Family–School Connectedness and Children's Early Social Development". Social Development. 21 (1): 21–46. doi:10.1111/j.1467-9507.2011.00623.x.
- Serpell, Zewelanji N.; Wilkerson, Trakita; Evans, Steven W.; Nortey-Washington, Melissa; Johnson-White, Rhonda; Paternite, Carl E. (December 2020). "Developing a Framework for Curtailing Exclusionary Discipline for African-American Students with Disruptive Behavior Problems: A Mixed-Methods Approach". School Mental Health. 12 (4): 661–676. doi:10.1007/s12310-020-09380-z. S2CID 255587464.
