= James Furrow =

American therapist

James L. Furrow is an American marriage and family therapist, contributor to the practice of emotionally focused therapy, and adjunct faculty at Seattle University. He was formerly the Evelyn and Frank Reed Professor of Martial and Family Therapy at Fuller Theological Seminary.

== Selected publications ==
- Furrow, James L.; Johnson, Susan M.; Bradley, Brent A., eds. (2011). The emotionally focused casebook: new directions in treating couples. New York: Brunner-Routledge. doi:10.4324/9780203818046. ISBN 9780415998758. OCLC 694172112.
- Johnson, Susan M.; Bradley, Brent A.; Furrow, James L.; Lee, Alison C.; Palmer, Gail; Tilley, Doug; Woolley, Scott R. (2005). Becoming an emotionally focused couple therapist: the workbook. New York: Routledge. doi:10.4324/9780203955161. ISBN 0415947472. OCLC 65645168.
- Furrow, James L.; Wagener, Linda M., eds. (2003). Beyond the self: perspectives on identity and transcendence among youth. Mahwah, NJ: Lawrence Erlbaum Associates. doi:10.4324/9780203764688. ISBN 080589599X. OCLC 56200919.
