= List of Afrofuturist literature =

Afrofuturism, as a genre, describes fictional works which encompass Black science fiction and may engage with any and all structural elements of the broader umbrella of subgenres (horror, fantasy, magical realism, historical fiction, etc.) classified under Black speculative fiction.

Afrofuturist literary works resist singular notions of a “Black” cultural experience. Instead, Afrofuturist narratives draw upon a variety of ethnic, national, regional histories and cosmologies, as well as indigenous religious frameworks. Thematically, Afrofuturist literature delves into revisionist or alternative history making, while galvanizing conversations on social injustice and Black liberation. Afrofuturist literature investigates questions of Black intellectual production, materiality, and intellectual ownership, while reimagining the potential futures of individuals within the Afrodiaspora.

The emerging genre of Afrofuturist literature is influenced by two strands, Afro-pessimism and Black optimism. Afro-pessimism asserts that the violence of colonialism and slavery contributes to a definition of Blackness as a state of non-being. In this state, Black individuals exist within and yet are alienated from the rest of society. In Afrofuturist literature, Afro-pessimism underscores a bleak view of futurity and any inherent possibility for Black self-determination and social advancement. In contrast, Black optimism reconsiders Blackness after slavery and colonialism relative to modernity, technology, and culture. Black optimism emphasizes Blackness as a complete and holistic state of being. It rejects the essentialism and inherent abjectness of socially-determined “Blackness” as portrayed in Afro-pessimism. Within the context of Afrofuturist literature, the Black imaginary and its creative expression are essential pivot points for self-determining futurity.

== List of Afrofuturist literature ==
Author(s)/Editor(s)	Year	Title
Butler, Octavia	1979	Kindred
Charles R. Saunders	1981	Imaro
Du Bois, W. E. B.	1920	Darkwater: Voices from Within the Veil
Ellison, Ralph	1952	Invisible Man
Hopkinson, Nalo	1998	Brown Girl in the Ring
Jemisin, N.K.	2015	The Fifth Season
Due, Tananarive	1997	My Soul to Keep
Farmer, Nancy	1994	The Ear, the Eye and the Arm
Wilson, Kai Ashante	2015	The Sorcerer of the Wildeeps
James, Marlon	2019	Black Leopard, Red Wolf
Schuyler, George	1931	Black No More
Adeyemi, Tomi	2018	Children of Blood and Bone
Tutuola, Amos	1952	The Palm-Wine Drinkard
Callender, Kacen	2019	Queen of the Conquered
Johnson, Mat	2011	Pym
Okri, Ben	1991	The Famished Road
Deonn, Tracy	2020	Legendborn
Whitehead, Colson	2011	Zone One
Bayron, Kalynn	2020	Cinderella is Dead
Ifueko, Jordan	2020	Raybearer
Monáe, Janelle	2022	The Memory Librarian: And Other Stories of Dirty Computer
Clarke, Matthew; Lynch, Nigel	2021	Hardears
Fielder, Tim	2021	Infinitum: An Afrofuturist Tale
Campbell, Bill; Hall, Edward Austin	2013	Mothership: Tales from Afrofuturism and Beyond
Olayiwola, Porsha	2019	i shimmer sometimes, too
Reed, Ishmael	1972	Mumbo Jumbo
Lord, Karen	2014	The Galaxy Game
Okupe, Roye	2015	E.X.O.: The Legend of Wale WIlliams
Johnson, Dawn Alaya	2020	Trouble The Saints
Kwame, Mbalia	2020	Tristian Strong Destroys the World
Banks, Leslie	2003	The Vampire Huntress Legend Series: Minion
Mbalia, Kwame	2019	Tristan Strong Punches a Hole in the Sky
Ireland, Justina	2018	Dread Nation
James, Marlon	2022	Moon Witch, Spider King
Barnes, Steven	2002	Lion's Blood
Allen, Jeffery Renard	2014	Song of the Shank
Jackson, Kosoko	2022	Survive the Dome
Forma, Namina	2021	The Gilded Ones
Shawl, Nisi	2016	Everfair
Nisi Shawl	2008	Filter House
Hairston, Andrea	2006	Mindscape
Broaddus, Maurice	2022	Sweep of Stars
Ireland, Justina	2020	Deathless Divide
Okorafor, Nnedi	2015	Binti
Solomon, Rivers	2017	An Unkindness of Ghosts
Delany, Martin R.	1859	Blake; or the Huts of America
Thomas, Sheree R.	2000	Dark Matter (prose anthologies)
Chesnutt, Charles	1899	The Conjure Woman
Turnbull, Cadwell	2021	No Gods, No Monsters
Mosley, Walter	2001	Futureland
Thomas, Sheree	2022	Africa Risen
Drew, Kimberly; Wortham, J	2020	Black Futures
Clarke, Matthew; Lynch, Nigel	2021	Hardears: A Graphic Novel
Jesse J. Holland	2017	Black Panther: Who is the Black Panther?
Onyebuchi, Tochi	2017	Beasts Made of Night
Samuel R. Delany	1975	Dhalgren
Allen; Cherelle	2019	Black From the Future: A Collection of Black Speculative Writing
Sutton E. Griggs	1899	Imperium in Imperio
P. Djèlí Clark	2020	Ring shout
C. L. Polk	2020	The Midnight Bargain
Cadwell Turnbull	2019	The Lesson
Cadwell Turnbull	2023	We Are the Crisis
