= Ignyte Award for Outstanding Novel – Adult =

Annual literary award for speculative fiction

- Awarded for: Works over 40,000 words for an adult audience, written by up to 2 authors
- Country: United States
- Presented by: FIYAH Literary Magazine
- First award: 2020; 6 years ago
- Most recent winner: Stephen Graham Jones (The Buffalo Hunter Hunter)
- Website: ignyteawards.fiyahlitmag.com

The Ignyte Award for Outstanding Novel — Adult is a literary award given annually as part of the Ignyte Awards.

== Winners and finalists ==
* Winners

Year	Author	Work	Ref.
2020	Silvia Moreno-Garcia*	Gods of Jade and Shadow	
2020	S. A. Chakraborty	The Kingdom of Copper	
2020	R. F. Kuang	The Dragon Republic	
2020	Fonda Lee	Jade War	
2020	Rebecca Roanhorse	Storm of Locusts	
2021	Rebecca Roanhorse*	Black Sun	
2021	N. K. Jemisin	The City We Became	
2021	Hao Jingfang (author)	Vagabonds	
2021	Ken Liu (translator)	Vagabonds	
2021	Stephen Graham Jones	The Only Good Indians	
2021	C. L. Polk	The Midnight Bargain	
2022	P. Djèlí Clark*	A Master of Djinn	
2022	Ryka Aoki	Light from Uncommon Stars	
2022	Zen Cho	Black Water Sister	
2022	C. L. Clark	The Unbroken	
2022	Rivers Solomon	Sorrowland	
2023	N.E. Davenport*	The Blood Trials	
2023	Simon Jimenez	The Spear Cuts Through Water	
2023	R. F. Kuang	Babel	
2023	Vaishnavi Patel	Kaikeyi	
2023	Nghi Vo	Siren Queen	
2024	Vajra Chandrasekera*	The Saint of Bright Doors	
2024	Moniquill Blackgoose	To Shape a Dragon's Breath	
2024	S. L. Huang	The Water Outlaws	
2024	Wole Talabi	Shigidi and the Brass Head of Obalufon	
2024	Cadwell Turnbull	We Are the Crisis	
2025	Gautam Bhatia*	The Sentence	
2025	August Clarke	Metal from Heaven	
2025	Nalo Hopkinson	Blackheart Man	
2025	Justinian Huang	The Emperor and the Endless Palace	
2025	Tlotlo Tsamaase	Womb City	
2026	Stephen Graham Jones*	The Buffalo Hunter Hunter	
2026	M.H. Ayinde	A Song of Legends Lost	
2026	Oyinkan Braithwaite	Cursed Daughters	
2026	Linda H. Codega	Motheater	
2026	Tochi Onyebuchi	Harmattan Season	
