= The Adventures of Amina al-Sirafi =

2023 novel by Shannon Chakraborty

- Author: Shannon Chakraborty
- Language: English
- Series: The Adventures of Amina al-Sirafi
- Release number: 1
- Set in: 12th century; Indian Ocean; Socotra
- Publisher: Harper Voyager
- Publication date: 7 Mar 2023
- Publication place: United States
- Pages: 496
- ISBN: 9780062963505

The Adventures of Amina al-Sirafi is a 2023 historical fantasy novel by Shannon Chakraborty. It is the first novel in a planned trilogy.

The novel was a finalist for the 2024 Hugo Award for Best Novel.

== Plot ==
In a frame story, pirate captain Amina al-Sirafi narrates her tale to the scribe Jamal.

After retiring, Amina lives a quiet life with her daughter Marjana. A woman named Salima tells Amina that her granddaughter Dunya is missing. Dunya’s father was Asif, one of Amina’s crew members who died under unclear circumstances. Dunya has disappeared after meeting with a Frankish mercenary and occultist named Falco Palamenestra. Amina recruits a team of her former crewmates to retrieve Dunya. These include Dalila, an expert poisoner; Tinbu, her first mate; and Majed, her navigator. They sail aboard the Marawati.

Amina learns that Dunya is leading Falco to the Moon of Saba, a pearl rumored to have magical powers. The pearl is said to have been given to Queen Bilqis by the moon manzil Al-Dabaran. The Marawati tracks Falco to Socotra. There, Amina is confronted by a demon named Raksh. Raksh is Amina’s husband, Marjana’s father, and the creature responsible for Asif’s death. He is still bound to Amina by their marriage contract and unbeknownst to Raksh, the existence of their daughter.

The Marawati rescues Dunya. She tells Amina that the Moon of Saba is not a pearl at all, but a wash basin that holds the spirit of Al-Dabaran. Dunya admits that she was not kidnapped; she went with Falco willingly because she has been questioning her gender identity and is fleeing an arranged marriage. Falco and his captive marid capture the Marawati. In exchange for Dunya’s cooperation, Falco agrees to let the Marawati’s crew live. He stabs Amina and throws her overboard.

Amina and Raksh wash ashore on a magical island. Amina drinks water from the island, which grants her magical powers. This violates the laws of the peri who rule the island; they believe in a strict separation between human and magical realms. Amina is granted permission to leave the island in exchange for hunting down five magical artifacts, including the Moon of Saba.

Amina has a flashback to the night that Asif died. Asif had died from a plague, but as a result of a contract with Raksh, his corpse rose from the dead and became violent. Amina was forced to burn the reanimated corpse, traumatizing herself and the rest of the crew.

Back on Socotra, Amina reaches Dunya and Falco just as they retrieve the Moon of Saba. Amina and Dunya destroy the Moon of Saba, free Al-Dabaran, and kill Falco. Amina and her crew agree to continue hunting down magical relics. Amina returns to her family. Dunya embraces the name Jamal and lives as a trans man. Amina refuses to return him to Salima. She begins to recount her adventures to Jamal and Marjana.

== Style ==
The story is narrated by Amina in first person narration as she speaks to a scribe. Throughout the book, interludes relate tales of the Moon of Saba.

== Background ==
The novel is set in the same universe as Chakraborty's Daevabad Trilogy, though it is set several centuries earlier.

In an interview with Kalyani Saxena, Chakraborty explains that she wrote the book during the COVID-19 pandemic, mostly between the hours of 4 A.M. and 6 A.M. before her daughter's online school began. This inspired the theme of motherhood which is explored in the novel. Chakraborty also stated that Amina's journey away from Islam and back to faith is "an intrinsic part of my religion and my journey ... I wanted to show that you can fail and you can do terrible things and you can still even struggle ... but that that’s okay."

== Reception ==
Bookpage gave the novel a starred review, calling it "a swashbuckling high seas quest that’s rousing, profound, and irresistible." The review praised the chemistry between the main characters as well as the "impressively researched history" underpinning the setting. Kirkus gave the novel a starred review, writing that the novel has "swashbuckling that puts Sindbad to shame". The review praised Chakraborty's decision to use a middle-aged mother as a protagonist as opposed to the more common "young, inexperienced hero or ... grizzled loner veteran". Amina "exists in a society where women are expected to stay home and tend to family", and must balance her love for her daughter and her love for adventure.

Writing for the New York Times, author Tochi Onyebuchi noted that "there's a reason why 'one last job' remains such a popular and powerful subgenre". Onyebuchi also noted that "what is most refreshing about [the novel] is how concerned Amina is for the state of her soul." Despite the fact that she often drinks alcohol and misses prayer, he feels that "Amina's religiosity feels intimate and lived-in". He also praised the "adroit commentary on class conflict, piety, warfare and gender politics, particularly how these things are perpetuated through myth and storytelling". A review by Chris Kluwe in Lightspeed notes that the novel feels "like a heist movie à la Ocean’s Eleven or The Italian Job." Kluwe also commented on the snappy dialogue and the novel's complex portrayal of the major characters. Lacy Baugher Milas of Paste Magazine wrote that the novel is "one part traditional heist story and one part magical adventure". She believes that the novel pushes back against the traditional tropes in pirate stories, which can include "swordfights, rum, probably some treasure, [and] maybe a little misogyny". In contrast to many fantasy stories, in which the heroine may start as a young woman who goes on a journey of self-discovery, the novel starts in the middle of Amina's life. This is "a perspective and a character type we see very infrequently in this genre".

A review in Grimdark Magazine praised the "nuanced treatment of queer characters within the historical and religious context of the story" as well as the "weaving in of stories, using the past as something of a mythologized tale to create a larger-than-life version of Amina". Publishers Weekly praised the novel, stating "this swashbuckling adventure is sure to delight". The review positively commented on the cast, the plot, and the dry humor.

A review for Tor.com notes that the ending is "maybe a little too wacky", but praised the characterization of Amina and her crew.
