= War Girls =

2019 novel by Tochi Onyebuchi

- War Girls
- Author: Tochi Onyebuchi
- Language: English
- Series: War Girls series
- Genre: Science fiction
- Publisher: Razorbill
- Publication date: September 8, 2019
- Publication place: Nigeria
- Media type: Print (Paperback)
- Pages: 464
- ISBN: 9780451481672
- Preceded by: Crown of Thunder
- Followed by: Riot Baby

War Girls is a 2019 science fiction novel by Nigerian-American author Tochi Onyebuchi. The novel depicts a post-apocalyptic future world that has been environmentally devastated by nuclear conflict and global warming. The North American and European powers responsible for the devastation have escaped to colonies in space and exploited the nations left on Earth for their scarce remaining resources. In the novel, characters Ify and Onyii navigate a Nigeria torn apart by a resurgent Nigerian Civil War. The novel explores themes of colonialism, climate change, war, and posthumanism. It is an Africanfuturist work of climate fiction.

== Plot ==
In a post-apocalyptic 2172, Nigeria is in the midst of a decades-long civil war between the national government and Biafran separatists, sparked by ethnic tensions and conflict over the powerful mineral Chukwu. Many people have undergone cyberization after sustaining war injuries related to war or radiation, in a process known as "augmentation".The story alternates between the perspectives of Ify and Onyii, inhabitants of a camp for War Girls, a group of orphaned teenagers who were once child soldiers in the Biafran military.

=== Part I ===
Ify uses her Accent, a device she invented which enables her to hack into cyberized organisms, to access a Nigerian network, unintentionally revealing the War Girls' location to the Nigerian military. Nigerian mechs attack the camp, and the War Girls meet them in battle. A squad of soldiers led by the Nigerian commander Daren capture Ify. Many of the War Girls are killed in the fighting, but Onyii is spared by Daurama, Daren's sister, and manages to escape with comrades Chinelo, Kesandu, and Obioma. Daurama and Daren take Ify with them back to the Nigerian capital of Abuja.

During the flight to Abuja, Daren and Daurama reveal to Ify that she had been kidnapped by the Biafrans, and they try convince Ify to study in Nigeria by taking advantage of her "hunger" to learn. However, their conversation is interrupted when an explosion rocks the aircraft, sending it into a tailspin. Meanwhile, the War Girls are taken in by the Biafran military, and Onyii decides to fight for them in order to avenge Ify, whom she presumes dead.

=== Part II ===
Four years later, Ify is a student in Abuja, while Onyii fights for the Biafran military as a mech pilot alongside Chinelo, Kesandu, and Obioma. The War Girls are given abds, robotic children programmed to protect them.

The Biafran military, seeking to force a ceasefire with Nigeria, sets out to expose the illegal military partnership between Nigeria and the Commonwealth Space Colonies. They send the War Girls and their abds to infiltrate a Nigerian oil derrick where the shipments of mechs from the Colonies are being stored. Daurama is killed during fighting in the derrick, and the girls take workers from the Colonies hostage.

Daren and Ify learn of the attack on the oil derrick during a security conference, and Daren rushes out to fight the Biafran infiltrators. Ify chases after Daren, but falls unconscious after connecting to him through a surveillance helmet. The War Girls use this connection to broadcast images of the Colonies' mechs. Daren arrives to engage the Biafrans in battle, and several War Girls and abds die in the fighting. The remaining Biafrans escape after killing the hostages.

Ify is arrested for treason and subjected to interrogation and torture. Daren turns Ify against Onyii by using her accent to reveal that Onyii had killed her parents, and she sets out to the Biafran border to enact vengeance. The remaining War Girls are ordered to kill their abds, but Onyii allows her abd Agu to go free. A ceasefire is called.

=== Part III ===
Nine months later, Onyii and Chinelo are in the process of adjusting to peacetime life in the Biafran capital of Enugu, and begin to fall in love. Ify continues to hunt down Onyii, and meets up with Dr. Xifeng, who has come to Nigeria from China on a humanitarian mission to document the war. Ify also meets Agu on the road to Enugu.

Ify confronts Onyii in her apartment, intent on killing her, but Onyii is able to escape through a window after Agu sacrifices himself to break her fall. Meanwhile, the Nigerians launch an assault on Enugu, breaking the ceasefire, and Chinelo is gravely wounded in the attack. Onyii uses a mech to fly to the border, where she confronts the Nigerians. There, Onyii encounters Daren, who reveals that he had implanted Ify with a tracking device, and had been using her all along to locate Onyii. Onyii kills Daren, and uses his mech to find Ify, who had returned to the ruins of their old camp.

After a tense exchange between Ify and Onyii, Ify is arrested by the Biafran authorities, and sentenced to death. However, Onyii and her old mentor Adaeze rescue Ify from execution, and take her to Adaeze's cottage. Their hideout is discovered by Biafran soldiers, and Ify and Onyii are forced to flee through the Redlands, a nuclear wasteland. The girls take refuge with Xifeng, who helps Onyii smuggle Ify onto a Gabonese spaceship to the Colonies. Onyii stays behind on Earth, knowing that she will soon succumb to cancer from her exposure to radiation in the Redlands.

== Characters ==
Onyii: The protagonist of the novel. A Biafran soldier who is especially skilled at piloting mechs. Referred to by her enemies as the "Demon of Biafra" due to her skills on the battlefield.

Ify: The second protagonist of the novel. An ethnically Nigerian scientific genius who is saved from being killed and raised by Onyii in the war girls' camp.

Daren: The main antagonist of the novel. A celebrated Nigerian general who captures Ify from the Biafrans and assimilates her into Nigerian life. Leads the Nigerian war effort against the Biafrans.

Daurama: Daren's sister. She shows strong resentment towards Ify throughout the novel, much to Ify's chagrin and confusion.

Adaeze: A former Biafran war girl who inspired Onyii to join the Biafran war effort.

Agu: Onyii's assigned synthetic human that is programmed to protect her.

Chinelo: Onyii's comrade, best friend, and eventual lover.

Xifeng: Chinese humanitarian who came to Nigeria to document the civil war in hopes of gaining aid from other nations.

== Setting ==
The book opens in a futuristic Nigeria of 2172. Much of the Western Hemisphere has been destroyed by nuclear war and global warming. North America and Europe are uninhabitable due to radiation, while China and Southeast Asia remain habitable. The Western powers, called the Commonwealth Countries, have escaped to space, where they have established the Space Colonies. Much of Nigeria is irradiated, except for a lush Middle Belt. Ify dreams of using her technological prowess to reverse the damage of climate change in Nigeria. The novel conveys the dangers of nuclear warfare and climate change, as well as how Western powers may avoid culpability for rendering Earth uninhabitable.

== Themes ==
War Girls explores on the themes of war, climate change, colonialism, and posthumanism.

War

The novel depicts a bloody and intractable civil war between the Nigerian state and Biafran separatists. In the novel's extended battle scenes, science-fictional technologies intensify the brutality of war. Onyebuchi also explores the consequences of war when he renders a refugee crisis in the wake of a ceasefire and portrays caravans of displaced people seeking safety and reunion with their loved ones.

Climate change

The world of War Girls has been destroyed by nuclear warfare and global warming. Half the planet has been rendered uninhabitable due to radiation, and the global elite are seen to continue their exploitation of natural resources, especially the sacred mineral Chukwu in Biafra. The novel comments on the unequal and disproportionate impact of climate change by showing that wealthy nations have migrated to space, where they have begun the process of colonization anew.

Colonialism

Onyebuchi links the history of colonization and imperialism to nuclear annihilation and the climate crisis. Western imperial powers are seen to be responsible for environmental destruction but, under the auspices of the Commonwealth Countries, they have also managed to escape to space. There they have reconstituted the social and racial hierarchies of Earth.

Posthumanism

The novel blurs the line between human and machine, particularly in its rendering of Augments–humans who have been partially cyberized–and in its rendering of abds, synths who look like young boys and who seem, at times, to demonstrate agency and emotion. Characters struggle with how to classify these characters, and the novel explores what happens when the category of human is denied them.

== Glossary of sci-fi terms ==
Aerial mechs - Massive humanoid robots used for battle in the sky.

Accent - Tiny piece of tech, small ball, placed inside the ear. Allows one to see anything in the camp's network, can hack others

Augments - Technologically enhanced prosthetics, used to repair damage from war or radiation.

Beast - A chimeric, cybernetic creature with the head of a horse and the body of a lion. Attacks Ify.

Bees (augment) - Can sense humidity and radiation in the environment.

Big-Big - A nuclear and climate event that caused the sky to bleed and people to flee Earth.

Chukwu - A rare and powerful mineral, named for the supreme creator deity in Igbo mythology. Chukwu powers all of Nigeria, and the war between the Biafrans and Nigerians, was, in part, sparked by conflict over it. It can be ground and ingested to be used as a healing agent.

Comms - Communication systems between soldiers.

Enyemaka - A robot/android that protected Onyii, made out of spare technology that the girls could find

Eto-Eto - A clay doll capable of being infused with genetic material via nanobots.

Fiber optic cables - Uses energy from Chukwu to release water from the soil.

Green-and-Whites - Nigerian mechs, so-called because they are painted with the green and white of the Nigerian flag.

Middle Belt - Strip of lush, habitable land between Biafra and larger Nigeria.

Obelisk - A tower in the War Girls' camp that turns Chukwu into power.

Red-bloods - Those who have not undergone augmentation.

Redlands - A zone of highly irradiated nuclear wasteland located beyond Biafra. The region is completely uninhabitable without special protection.

Signal dampener - A machine that hides the War Girls' camp from the Nigerian authorities.

Space Colonies - Enormous space habitats for those who were able to escape Earth after the Big-Big.

Synths - Automata in human bodies. The abds are synths.

Terminal - Console station set up on a small dais, where the control panel stands. Control panel for the camp.

== Reception ==
In a review for The New York Times, writer Margaret Wappler praised the novel for its "invaluable insight into the devastation of war for the most vulnerable victims," but criticized its action scenes as unclear and some of the characters as "underdeveloped." Writing for Africa Access Review, Toyin Falola, a professor of African Studies at the University of Texas at Austin, hailed the novel as an "ingeniously crafted… philosophical, exciting adventure" and praised its exploration of the "themes of identity" with respect to "race, ethnicity, and technology."

The novel was a finalist for the 2020 young adult novel Locus Award, and was on the shortlist for the 2020 Neukom Institute Literary Arts Awards. The novel was awarded Honor Book for Older Readers by the 2020 Children's Africana Book Awards.
