= A Ruin, Great and Free =

2025 fantasy novel by Cadwell Turnbull

- First edition cover art
- Author: Cadwell Turnbull
- Cover artist: Kathryn Galloway English
- Language: English
- Series: Convergence
- Release number: 3rd in series
- Genre: Urban fantasy
- Publisher: Blackstone Publishing
- Publication date: September 16, 2025
- Publication place: United States
- Pages: 374
- ISBN: 9781094175904
- Preceded by: We Are the Crisis

A Ruin, Great and Free is an urban fantasy novel by American author Cadwell Turnbull. It was published by Blackstone Publishing on September 16, 2025. It is the third and final entry in the Convergence Saga. An audiobook narrated by Dion Graham was released on November 15, 2025.

== Development ==
Turnbull had outlined the final scene of the novel while writing No Gods, No Monsters, the first book in the Convergence Saga. He cites X-Men: Days of Future Past, N.K. Jemisin's Inheritance Trilogy, and The Leftovers TV series as inspirations for the novel.

== Synopsis ==
It is two years after the events of We Are the Crisis and the Black Hand has driven monsters and their allies into small towns hidden by magic. Some of the residents of a refuge called Moon are sneaking into neighboring towns, threatening to expose their refuge to the Black Hand, while the Cult of Zsouvox want to turn Moon into a battleground in their war against the Order of Asha. Meanwhile, in the universe of The Lesson, Turnbull's debut novel, Patrice Paige uses technology left behind by the alien Ynaa after their first contact with humanity in order to increase her political influence and shield the Earth from future alien encounters. Both of these universes, and indeed all universes, are threatened by the Zsouvox, a divine creation that seeks to devour everything.

== Reception ==
The audiobook edition of the novel was nominated for an Audie Award for Fantasy.

Kirkus Reviews called the novel "profoundly creative, but not entirely easy or satisfying to grasp." Kristi Chadwick of Library Journal called the novel "stunning in its emotional depth". In his review for Reactor, Tobias Carroll called the novel as "ambitious" but stated that it "requires some patience". Jenna Hanchey of Ancillary Review of Books called the novel "mind-bending".
