= Racebook: A Personal History of the Internet =

2025 book by Tochi Onyebuchi

- Author: Tochi Onyebuchi
- Language: English
- Genre: Essay; memoir; non-fiction
- Publisher: Roxane Gay Books
- Publication date: 21 Oct 2025
- Pages: 256 (Hardcover)
- ISBN: 9780802166258

Racebook: A Personal History of the Internet is a 2025 non-fiction book by Tochi Onyebuchi. A collection of essays, it examines the evolution of the Internet and the author's experience with race in the online world.

== Contents ==
The collection includes essays which discuss Onyebuchi's personal growth and development alongside the development of the Internet. These essays are presented in roughly reverse chronological order, divided into sections labeled as Web 3.0, Web 2.0, and Web 1.0.

== Background ==
In an interview with NPR host Juana Summers, Onyebuchi noted that prior to the year 2012, "I existed on the internet as a sort of skinless, raceless entity." After the killing of Trayvon Martin and the subsequent trial and acquittal, his perception of the Internet changed. Onyebuchi realized that there was a much greater diversity of opinion regarding the outcome of the case than he had previously realized. This was also a turning point in which he realized that the Internet could be used for organization and activism.

== Publication History ==
Several essays in the collection were previously published before being included in the collection.

- "Pretty Woman: On the Allure of Androids" was published by Reactor in May 2019.
- "White Bears in Sugar Land: Juneteenth, Cages, and Afrofuturism" was published by Reactor in June 2019.
- "Select Difficulty" was published by Reactor in August 2019.
- "I Have No Mouth, and I Must Scream: The Duty of the Black Writer During Times of American Unrest" was published by Reactor in June 2020.
- "I Have a Rendezvous with Death" appeared in Ploughshares in April 2024.

== Reception and awards ==
Publishers Weekly gave the collection a starred review, calling it a "must-read." The review wrote that Onyebuchi offers a nostalgic look at earlier forms of the Internet, and that the essays trace the development of the Internet "from a resource for learning to a tool for social justice activism to a mechanism for commercializing attention." The review commented on the essay "I Have No Mouth and I Must Scream: The Duty of the Black Writer During Times of American Unrest," calling it a "standout" and praising the author's "searing honesty."

Kirkus praised the author's impressive cultural vocabulary, which references both classic and contemporary media. The review particularly praised several of the essays. In "I Have No Mouth and I Must Scream," Onyebuchi "contemplates the role of the Black writer in the context of cultural artifacts ranging from Ralph Ellison’s Invisible Man to videos of 'police-initiated executions' of Black citizens." The essay "Select Difficulty" uses the video game The Last of Us to examine Onyebuchi's relationship with his father, who died when the author was a child. Kirkus noted that some of the essays are more cohesive than others, but concluded that the collection was "lively and astute."

The essay "I Have No Mouth and I Must Scream: The Duty of the Black Writer During Times of American Unrest" won the 2021 Ignyte Award for Outstanding Creative Nonfiction. The collection was a finalist for the 2026 Locus Award for Best Non-fiction.
