= Indian Constitution: A Conversation with Power =

Non-fiction book (2025)

The Indian Constitution: A Conversation with Power
- Author: Gautam Bhatia
- Language: English
- Subject: Indian Constitution, constitutional law, political theory
- Genre: Non-fiction
- Publisher: HarperCollins India
- Publication date: 2025
- Publication place: India

Indian Constitution: A Conversation with Power is a non-fiction book authored by Indian constitutional lawyer and scholar Gautam Bhatia, published in February 2025 by HarperCollins India. The book examines the Indian Constitution through the conceptual lens of power—its formation, distribution, and contestation within India's constitutional framework.

== Content and themes ==
The book analyzes the Indian constitutional structure by exploring six major themes: federalism, parliamentarianism, pluralism, institutions, rights, and the people. Bhatia presents the Constitution as a framework that, despite a formally balanced design, has historically enabled the centralization of authority, particularly within the Union executive. The book also discusses how judicial interpretations have contributed to this trend in various contexts.

One chapter, titled Interlude: Yesterday’s Tomorrow, considers constitutional alternatives and historical developments that did not materialize. It reflects on documents such as the Mysore Constitution of 1920 and constitutional reform efforts in the aftermath of the Emergency in the late 1970s.

== Reception ==
Indian Constitution: A Conversation with Power received favorable reviews from Indian academic and media publications.

The Tribune praised the book for its combination of historical case studies and constitutional analysis, noting Bhatia’s argument that both the constitutional text and judicial interpretations have contributed to a longstanding trend of centralization.

The Hindustan Times highlighted the book’s ability to explain complex legal concepts in an accessible manner and noted its discussion of executive dominance and unwritten constitutional conventions.

The Week described the book as a "bold critique of power and democracy," and emphasized its comparative approach and capacity to provoke reflection on the future of Indian constitutionalism.
