= As the Last I May Know =

2019 fantasy short story by S. L. Huang

"As the Last I May Know" is a 2019 fantasy short story by S. L. Huang, about nuclear deterrence. It was first published on Tor.com. The story takes inspiration from a suggestion by academic Roger Fisher on how to prevent nuclear war.

== Synopsis ==
Nyma is a ten-year-old child who must accompany the President of her nation everywhere he goes, because a capsule with weapon launch codes has been surgically implanted in her heart, such that if the President wants to use those weapons, he must first kill her.

== Reception ==
"As The Last I May Know" won the 2020 Hugo Award for Best Short Story.
