= The Water Outlaws =

2023 novel by S. L. Huang

- Author: S. L. Huang
- Language: English
- Genre: Fantasy
- Published: 22 Aug 2023
- Publisher: Tor Books
- Publication place: United States
- ISBN: 9781250180421

The Water Outlaws is a 2023 novel by S. L. Huang, the author's debut novel. It is a genderbent reimagining of the classic Chinese novel Water Margin. The novel received critical praise and was a finalist for the 2023 Nebula Award for Best Novel, 2024 Ignyte Award for Best Novel, and 2024 Locus Award for Best Fantasy Novel.

== Plot ==
=== The Water Outlaws ===
In the city of Bianliang during the Song Dynasty, Master Arms Instructor Lin Chong teaches a martial arts class for women. Her trainees include Lu Da, warrior monk who fights with a staff and god's tooth. God's teeth are mystical stones that grant their wielders supernatural strength and other powers.

Lin Chong's friend Lu Junyi is a wealthy socialite, writer, and activist. Lin Chong accompanies her to a meeting with the corrupt Marshal Gao Qiu. Gao Qiu attempts to rape Lin Chong. When she defends herself, he has her arrested and demands her execution. Lu Junyi bribes officials to sentence Lin Chong to a prison camp instead.

Lu Junyi sends Lu Da to ensure Lin Chong's safety on the journey to the prison camp. Lu Da is also secretly a member of the Liangshan bandits, a group of honorable outlaws who fight against corrupt governmental systems. On orders from Gao Qiu, the guards try to murder Lin Chong. Lu Da saves her; they become sworn sisters, giving Lin Chong access to the power of the god's tooth.

Lin Chong is taken to Mount Liang, where she also joins the bandits. There, she meets several people including Wang Lun, the bandits’ founder; Song Jiang, an exiled poet; Chao Gai, chief of the village of Dongxi; and Wu Yong, the group's Tactician.

Chancellor Cai Jing, an official second only to the Emperor, blackmails Lu Junyi into researching the creation of god's teeth. She becomes the head of a secret research institution. She and her assistants begin making synthetic god's teeth, called god's fangs, but their early experiments fail and kill the wielders.

The bandits plan to rob a shipment of money belonging to Cai Jing. They pose as a group of wine merchants and offer drugged wine to the soldiers, allowing them to steal the money. The soldiers are led by commander Yang Zhi. Lin Chong sees that Yang Zhi is also a woman who has been mistreated by the Empire and convinces her to join the bandits. Cai Jing captures Bai Sheng, a wine merchant involved in the robbery, and tortures her for information before killing her. He sees the robbery as a personal slight and becomes set on destroying the bandits.

Wang Lun sees Lin Chong as a threat to her leadership. She manipulates Lin Chong into a fight. Lin Chong kills Wang Lun; Chao Gai becomes the new bandit leader. Cai Jing sends soldiers to destroy Dongxi, where Chai Gao is the village chief. The Liangshan bandits arrive too late; Dongxi is destroyed and its inhabitants have been massacred. Chao Gai releases trapped spirits to kill all the soldiers. As revenge for the destruction of the village, the bandits kill and cannibalize Bai Sheng's traitorous husband.

Despite significant safety concerns, Cai Jing orders Lu Junyi to finalize her research. He plans to attack the Liangshan bandits with a god's fang. Lin Chong and Wu Yong go to Bianling to recruit Lu Junyi. Lu Junyi declines to join them, but eventually decides to print pro-Liangshan propaganda with her printing press. Lin Chong and Wu Yong rescue one of Lu Junyi's researchers from prison. They are captured and brought to Cai Jing's workplace. Lu Junyi's assistants attempt to kill Cai Jing by using the god's fangs as a suicide bomb. Though much of their research is destroyed, Cai Jing survives.

Wu Yong and Lin Chong escape back to Mount Liang. They organize a layered defense of Mount Liang and its surrounding marshes. Many Imperial soldiers die in the ensuing battle. Chao Gai is killed; Song Jiang takes command. Despite their heavy losses, Imperial troops still greatly outnumber the Liangshan bandits. Wu Yong organizes a desperate raid to kill Cai Jing.

Lin Chong and Lu Da use the power of the god's tooth to run across the surface of the water, allowing them to reach Cai Jing's encampment. Lin Chong fights Gao Qiu, who wields a god's fang. She goads him into drawing too much power, killing much of the Imperial army in the resulting explosion. Cai Jing is wounded; Lu Junyi kills him.

Lu Junyi's propaganda leads to a wave of support of Liangshan. The public blames Cai Jing for trying to usurp the power of gods; the Emperor allows Liangshan to remain unscathed. In an epilogue, the bandits continue to fight corruption on behalf of villagers oppressed by corrupt officials.

=== The River Judge ===
This prequel novelette tells the story of Li Li, who eventually joins the Liangshan bandits and becomes a minor character in “The Water Outlaws.”

9 year old Li Li is the daughter of an innkeeper, who is often violent and drunk. Her father murders an Imperial magistrate. Li Li helps her mother to bury the body. When Imperial investigators arrive, Li Li's father kills them as well. Due to their rural location, these disappearances are not noticed in Bianliang.

Over the years, Li Li's father kills many people and she helps bury the bodies. When she is fifteen, the Empire finally sends a replacement magistrate. Her father kills the new magistrate and his companions. Due to a meat shortage, Li Li butchers the corpses and serves them to the inn's guests.

Li Li is visited by the ghost of the dead magistrate, who was stabbed in the back. She tells the ghost that her father was the killer. The ghost leads the newest investigators to a corpse buried in the inn's yard. The investigators kill Li Li's mother; she kills them in turn. Li Li's father flees, and she begins running the inn.

Years later, Li Li's father returns to take control of the business once again. Li Li kills him, butchers the body, and eats him.

== Major themes ==
Alana Joli Abbott wrote that the novel explores the concept of patriarchy and gender roles. The review gives several examples of this, noting that "Lin Chong has had to fight for every bit of success she has earned, only to be foiled by a mediocre man who holds authority over her, just because he’s a favorite of the Emperor." Abbott states that the novel has a "#MeToo sensibility that resonates clearly."

According to Laura Hubbard, The Water Outlaws explores the dichotomy "between what is good and what is lawful."

Despite often claiming to work for the good of the emperor and the empire, Lin Chong and her compatriots do not always (or even usually) stay within the confines of the law. They lie, cheat and even kill to maintain the peace that they have carved out for themselves within a society they see as corrupt.

Hubbard explains that Lin Chong joins the bandits and redefines herself, noting that their purpose is always just even if their methods lie outside the law.

== Background ==
In an interview with Clarkesworld, Huang stated "I’ve long been a strong fan of remix culture. I believe we’re always in conversation with everything else." Huang expressed an admiration for the original work, while noting its inherent misogyny. Of the original 108 bandits in Water Margin, Huang notes that 105 are male. Huang commented on the desire to gender-bend the story by stating "In my view of feminist and queer history, it is not strange at all to find a large group of women and/or queer people in a patriarchal society—instead, it is very natural. We always find each other!"

== Publication history ==
Later editions of the novel include a prequel novelette entitled The River Judge, which was first published in 2024.

== Reception and awards ==
Publishers Weekly gave the novel a starred review, writing that Huang "brilliantly retells the 14th-century Chinese classic Water Margin for a 21st-century audience." The review praised the diverse cast of characters, writing that Huang "brings a large and varied ensemble cast to vibrant life, skillfully including queer identities in a way that feels historically and mythically resonant..." Laura Hubbard of BookPage also gave the novel a starred review, calling it "a glorious, wuxia-inspired saga of femme and queer resistance in the face of oppression."

Liz Bourke of Locus compared the bandits of Liangshan to the Robin Hood mythos, while noting that they are "rather more complex and rather less straightforwardly heroic than many renditions of the Heroic Outlaw myth often are." Bourke praised the large cast of characters, particularly noting that Li Junyi's journey "is a fascinating examination of a privileged person with progressive ideals finding themselves in a situation where their ideals point one way and most of their incentives (like keeping their lifestyle, or even their life) point the other." Alana Joli Abbott of Paste felt that the novel was timely, stating that the "characters are marginalized, and they’re familiar, going through struggles in the early 1100s that readers still face in 2023: incompetent leaders with too much power, arrogant bureaucrats seeking to weaponize knowledge, and heroes who will stand up to those in power and say no." Tan Shan Hao of Strange Horizons praised the novel's exploration of gender. The review also praised the side characters of Lu Junyi and Lu Da, who both contrast with Lin Chong and provide examples of genuine friendships.

Work	Year	Award	Category	Result	Ref.
The Water Outlaws	2023	BSFA Award	Novel	Longlisted	
The Water Outlaws	2023	Nebula Award	Novel	Finalist	
The Water Outlaws	2024	Dragon Award	Fantasy Novel	Nominated	
The Water Outlaws	2024	Ignyte Award	Novel	Finalist	
The Water Outlaws	2024	Locus Award	Fantasy Novel	Finalist	
The River Judge	2025	Locus Award	Novelette	Finalist	
