= Ignyte Award for Outstanding Creative Nonfiction =

Annual literary award for speculative fiction

- Awarded for: Essays or nonfiction academic works related to the field of speculative fiction
- Country: United States
- Presented by: FIYAH Literary Magazine
- First award: 2020; 6 years ago
- Most recent winner: Gautam Bhatia (The Secret History of Indian Science Fiction )
- Website: ignyteawards.fiyahlitmag.com

The Ignyte Award for Outstanding Creative Nonfiction is a literary award given annually as part of the Ignyte Awards.

== Winners and finalists ==
* Winners

Year	Author	Work	Publisher	Ref.
2020	Tananarive Due*	"Black Horror Rising"	Uncanny Magazine, May-June 2019	
2020	Layla Al-Bedawi	"Tongue-Tied: A Catalog of Losses"	Fireside, January 2019	
2020	Charlie Jane Anders	Our Opinions Are Correct	—	
2020	Annalee Newitz	Our Opinions Are Correct	—	
2020	Rochelle Spencer	AfroSurrealism: The African Diaspora’s Surrealist Fiction	Routledge	
2020	Ebony Elizabeth Thomas	The Dark Fantastic	New York University Press	
2021	Tochi Onyebuchi*	"I Have No Mouth, and I Must Scream: The Duty of the Black Writer During Times of American Unrest"	Tor.com, June 2020	
2021	Tamara Jerée	"How to Make a Family: Queer Blood Bonds in Black Feminist Vampire Novels"	Strange Horizons, January 2020	
2021	Suyi Davies Okungbowa	"The African Superhero and the Legacy of Captain Africa"	Tor.com, August 2020	
2021	Tochi Onyebuchi	"Fine Weather, Isn't It?"	SWFA Bulletin #215	
2021	Nibedita Sen	"Life, Liberty and the Pursuit of Excellence"	Uncanny Magazine, September-October 2020	
2022	Vida Cruz*	"We Are the Mountain: A Look at the Inactive Protagonist"	Fantasy Magazine, August 2021	
2022	Monte Lin	"Where Will You Place Us When We Are Dead?"	Strange Horizons, June 2021	
2022	Arley Sorg	"What You Might Have Missed"	Uncanny Magazine, November-December, 2021	
2022	Fargo Tbakhi	"Roundtable: The Palestinian Speculative"	Strange Horizons, March 2021	
2022	N. A. Mansour	"Roundtable: The Palestinian Speculative"	Strange Horizons, March 2021	
2022	Rasha Abdulhadi	"Roundtable: The Palestinian Speculative"	Strange Horizons, March 2021	
2022	Troy L. Wiggins	"The Necessity of Slavery Stories"	Uncanny Magazine, July-August 2021	
2023	Dante Luiz*	"The H Word: Horror in a Country that Is Not Afraid of Death"	Nightmare Magazine, January 2022	
2023	Chesley Oxendine	"Indigeneity in SFF Gaming: The Ongoing Need for Respectful, Native-Centered Storytelling"	SFWA	
2023	Wole Talabi	"Preliminary Observations From An Incomplete History of African SFF"	SFWA	
2023	Joy Sanchez Taylor	"The Line Between Science Fiction and Fantasy Is Blurring and I’m Into It"	Apex Magazine, December 2022	
2023	LaDarrion Williams	"When Black Boys Find Magic"	FIYAH, Winter 2022	
2024	Lysz Flo*	"The Magic is in the Roots: Cultural Reconnection Through Magical Realism"	FIYAH, Winter 2023	
2024	Tania Chen	"Symmetry, Horror, and Identity"	Apparition Lit, April 2023	
2024	Maya Gittelman	"To Every Other Jobu Tupaki After Jamie Lee Curtis’s Oscar Win"	Tor.com, March 2023	
2024	L. Marie Wood	"The H Word: The ~~Fear~~ Horror of Change"	Nightmare Magazine, September 2023	
2024	Yi Izzy Yu	"The Substitute"	Unquiet Spirits	
2025	Eugen Bacon, ed.*	Afro-Centered Futurisms in Our Speculative Fiction	Bloomsbury Academic	
2025	Ted Chiang	"Why A.I. Isn’t Going to Make Art"	The New Yorker, August 2024	
2025	George M. Johnson	Flamboyants: The Queer Harlem Renaissance I Wish I’d Known	Farrar, Straus, Giroux	
2025	Charley Palmer (illustrator)	Flamboyants: The Queer Harlem Renaissance I Wish I’d Known	Farrar, Straus, Giroux	
2025	Micaiah Johnson	"All Insurrections Are Not Created Equal: On Writing Resistance After January 6th"	Reactor, October 2024	
2025	Shrinidhi Narasimhan	"In Other Wor(l)ds"	Strange Horizons, September 2024	
2026	Gautam Bhatia*	The Secret History of Indian Science Fiction	Alter Magazine, November 2025	
2026	Tanvir Ahmed	"Photon Torpedoes Break the Space Muqarnas: SFF Audiovisuals and Anti-Muslim Violence"	Strange Horizons, November 2025	
2026	Terry Bisson	The Outspoken and the Incendiary: Interviews with Radical Speculative Fiction Writers	PM	
2026	Susana M. Morris	Positive Obsession: The Life and Times of Octavia E. Butler	Amistad	
2026	Shyheim Williams	"A Conjuror’s Manifesto: Notes on the Afrosurreal"	Strange Horizons, June 2025	
