= The Kingdom of Copper =

2019 novel by S.A. Chakraborty

- Author: S. A. Chakraborty
- Language: English
- Series: The Daevabad Trilogy
- Release number: 2
- Genre: Fantasy
- Publisher: HarperVoyager
- Publication date: 2019
- Publication place: United States
- Pages: 640
- ISBN: 0062678132
- Preceded by: The City of Brass
- Followed by: The Empire of Gold

The Kingdom of Copper is an American fantasy novel written by S. A. Chakraborty. It is the Second of The Daevabad Trilogy, the sequel to The City of Brass and is followed by The Empire of Gold in 2020.

== Publication ==
The Kingdom of Copper was published by HarperCollins subsidiary HarperVoyager, on January 22, 2019. It is six hundred and forty pages long, features illustrations and maps, is printed in hardcover and paperback, and is available in digital download.

== Reception ==
A review by Paul Di Filippo in Locus says that the novel "digs into societal issues: economics and underclasses and power trips" and as such, invites comparison to The Traitor Baru Cormorant.

The Kingdom of Copper was nominated for the 2020 Ignyte Award for Outstanding Novel – Adult.
