= Murder by Pixel =

2022 novelette by S. L. Huang

"Murder by Pixel: Crime and Responsibility in the Digital Darkness" is a 2022 science fiction short story by S. L. Huang, about chatbots. It was first published in Clarkesworld Magazine.

== Synopsis ==
Rather than being a standard narrative, the story is presented as a work of investigative journalism, exploring the case of "Sylvie", an autonomous chatbot who has cyberbullied several people into suicide.

== Reception ==
"Murder by Pixel" was a finalist for the Nebula Award for Best Novelette of 2022, the 2023 Hugo Award for Best Novelette, and the 2023 Ignyte Award for Outstanding Novelette.

Locus called it "a skeleton of a story that exists to support a significant amount of real-world research", but emphasized that it is "[a]n intense and interesting look at a critical issue." Tangent Online noted that "nothing in the premise is beyond today's computer technology", and stated that although "[t]he topic is an important one (...) there seems to be no good reason to present it as a lightly fictionalized work rather than as nonfiction."
