= Eugen Bacon =

Tanzanian-Australian author

- Born: Eugen Matoyo; Tanzania
- Education: Strathmore University
- Occupations: Author; computer scientist
- Awards: 2023 British Fantasy Award for Best Non-fiction; 2025 BSFA Award for Best Short Non-fiction; 2025 Ignyte Award for Outstanding Creative Nonfiction; 2025 Locus Award for Best Non-fiction

Eugen Bacon (née Matoyo) is an African-Australian computer scientist and author of speculative fiction.

For her writing career, Bacon has won the British Fantasy Award, British Science Fiction Award, Ignyte Award, Locus Award, and SFWA Kate Wilhelm Solstice Award. She has been a finalist for other literary awards including the Aurealis Award, Ditmar Award, Nommo Award, Otherwise Award, Philip K. Dick Award, Shirley Jackson Award, Victorian Premier's Literary Awards, and World Fantasy Award.

== Early life and education ==
Eugen Bacon was born Eugen Matoyo. She was born near Mount Kilimanjaro in Tanzania. As a toddler, she moved with her family to Nairobi, Kenya. Her family later returned to Tanzania, while Bacon remained in boarding school there. She later lived in the UK before moving to Melbourne, Australia.

She studied Information Technology at Strathmore University in Kenya. She holds a Master of Science in distributed computer systems from the University of Greenwich. She worked in various IT roles. She later completed a Master of Arts in writing and a PhD in writing. In 2021, she stated that she worked as a corporate communications manager in addition to writing and editing.

She speaks English and Swahili.

== Writing career ==
She has published short fiction and novels in various genres within the literary speculative fiction field, including black speculative fiction and afrofuturism. She also writes nonfiction including essays, scholarly articles, book chapters and books.

In 2021, Bacon was a writer-in-residence at the Katharine Susannah Prichard Writer's Centre. She was the recipient of a 2024 Otherwise Fellowship. She served as the chair of the jury for the 2025 Otherwise Awards.

== Bibliography ==
=== Novels and novellas ===
- — (23 July 2019). Claiming T-Mo. Meerkat Press. ISBN 9781946154132.
- — (8 December 2020). Ivory's Story. NewCon Press. ISBN 9781912950768.
- — (15 March 2022). Mage of Fools. Meerkat Press. ISBN 9781946154842.
- — (7 February 2023). Broken Paradise. Luna Press Publishing. ISBN 9781913387327.
- — (1 August 2023). Serengotti. Transit Lounge Publishing. ISBN 9780645565362.
- Bacon, Eugen; Hook, Andrew (27 October 2023). Secondhand Daylight. Cosmic Egg Books. ISBN 9781803413556.
- — (2 September 2025). The Nga'phandileh Whisperer. Stars and Sabers Publishing. ISBN 9798991441940.
- — (16 September 2025). Novic. Meerkat Press. ISBN 9781965740019.

=== Short fiction ===
Collections

- Bacon, Eugen; Davies, Milton (6 October 2020). Hadithi & The State of Black Speculative Fiction. Luna Press Publishing. ISBN 9781913387334.
- — (1 December 2020). Black Moon: Graphic Speculative Flash Fiction. Illustrated by Elena Betti. IFWG Publishing International. ISBN 9781925956658.
- — (1 December 2020). The Road to Woop Woop & Other Stories. Meerkat Press. ISBN 9781946154316.
- — (14 December 2021). Saving Shadows. Illustrated by Elena Betti. NewCon Press. ISBN 9781914953057.
- — (8 September 2022). Chasing Whispers. Raw Dog Screaming Press. ISBN 9781947879447.
- — (20 June 2023). Danged Black Thing. Apex Book Company. ISBN 9781955765114.
- — (19 September 2024). A Place Between Waking and Forgetting. Raw Dog Screaming Press. ISBN 9781947879782.

Stories

- — (28 February 2021). "Unlimited Data". In Davis, Milton (ed.). Cyberfunk!. Mvmedia. ISBN 9781734627985.
- — (1 October 2020). "A Visit in Whitechapel". In Whates, Ian (ed.). London Centric: Tales of Future London. NewCon Press. ISBN 9781912950720.
- — (May–June 2021). "When the Water Stops". The Magazine of Fantasy & Science Fiction.
- — (10 August 2021). "The Failing Name". Fantasy Magazine. Vol. 70.
- — (21 September 2021). "Baba Klep". In Oghenechovwe, Donald Ekpeki (ed.). The Year's Best African Speculative Fiction (2021). Jembefola Press. ISBN 9781647100742.
- — (28 March 2022). "Naked Earth". In Chrulew, Matthew (ed.). Phase Change: Imagining Energy Futures. Twelfth Planet Press. ISBN 9781922101730.
- — (19 July 2022). "The Devil Don't Come With Horns". In Liaguno, Vince A.; Mason, Rena (eds.). Other Terrors: An Inclusive Anthology. William Morrow Paperbacks. ISBN 9780358658894.
- — (22 April 2023). "Human Beans". In Nováková, Julie; Law, Lucas K.; Forest, Susan (eds.). Life Beyond Us: An Original Anthology of SF Stories and Science Essays. Laksa Media Groups Inc. ISBN 9781988140476.
- — (21 November 2023). "Sina, the Child with No Echo". In Talabi, Wole (ed.). Mothersound: The Sauútiverse Anthology. Android Press. ISBN 9781958121603.

=== Anthologies (edited) ===
- Eugen Bacon; Gene Rowe, eds. (7 June 2022). Fission #2 Volume 1: Stories from the British Science Fiction Association. HWS Press. ISBN 9781910987162.
- Gene Rowe; Eugen Bacon, eds. (19 December 2022). Fission #2 Volume 2: Stories from the British Science Fiction Association. HWS Press. ISBN 9781910987186.
- Eugen Bacon; Gene Rowe, eds. (24 September 2023). Fission #3: Stories from the British Science Fiction Association. HWS Press. ISBN 9781910987193.
- Eugen Bacon; Gene Rowe, eds. (15 July 2024). Fission #4: An Anthology of Stories from the British Science Fiction Association. British Science Fiction Association. ISBN 9781068721601.
- Gene Rowe; Eugen Bacon, eds. (4 June 2025). Fission #5: An Anthology of Stories from the British Science Fiction Association. British Science Fiction Association. ISBN 9781068721625.
- Oghenechovwe Donald Ekpeki; Eugen Bacon; Milton Davis, eds. (12 December 2023). The Year's Best African Speculative Fiction (2022). CAEZIK SF & Fantasy. ISBN 9781647100766.
- —, ed. (23 February 2023). Languages of Water. MVMedia. ISBN 9798985733662.

=== Poetry ===
- — (2020). It's Folking Political. Ginninderra Press.
- — (2020). Her Bitch Dress. Ginninderra Press.
- Bacon, Eugen; Hecq, Dominique (19 January 2021). Speculate: A Collection of Microlit. Meerkat Press. ISBN 9781946154743.
- — (14 December 2023). Texture of Silence: An Illustrated Collection of Prose Poetry. Illustrated by Steve Simpson. Independent Legions Publishing. ISBN 9791280713780.

=== Non-fiction ===
Books

- — (3 May 2019). Writing Speculative Fiction: Creative and Critical Approaches. Bloomsbury Academic. ISBN 9781352006056.
- — (15 August 2022). An Earnest Blackness. Anti-Oedipus Press. ISBN 9780999153581.
- —, ed. (14 November 2024). Afro-Centered Futurisms in Our Speculative Fiction. Bloomsbury Academic. ISBN 9798765114667.

Articles and essays

- — (19 April 2011). "Chewing Over the Trials of Unemployment". Australian Broadcasting Corporation.
- — (31 December 2012). "Writerly Passage: Crafting Stories Within a Story". Bukker Tillibul. 7 (2). Swinburne University of Technology. doi:10.25916/sut.26284789. ISSN 1835-0836.
- — (31 December 2013). "Journaling: A Path to Exegesis in Creative Research". Text: Journal of Writing and Writing Courses. 18 (2). Australian Association of Writing Programs. doi:10.25916/sut.26294428. ISSN 1327-9556.
- — (17 December 2015). "Creative Practice - Finding the Right Mentor". New Writing. 13 (2). doi:10.1080/14790726.2015.1117495.
- — (17 December 2015). "Push – A Prototype of Displaced Fiction: Breaking the Circle of Silence (YA Literature)". New Writing. 13 (1). doi:10.1080/14790726.2015.1117496.
- — (24 January 2017). "Creative Research: Mixing Methods in Practice-led Research to Explore a Model of Stories-within-a-story to Build a Novel". New Writing. 14 (2). doi:10.1080/14790726.2016.1270969.
- — (23 February 2017). "The Scholarly Exegesis as a Memoir". New Writing. 14 (3). doi:10.1080/14790726.2017.1284245.
- — (October 2017). Stephen Higgins (ed.). "Crossing Genre: Exemplars of Literary Speculative Fiction". Aurealis. No. 105.
- — (June 2018). Michael Pryor (ed.). "What is AfroSF?". Aurealis. No. 111.
- — (May 2019). Stephen Higgins (ed.). "Writing and Reading Speculative Fiction". Aurealis. No. 120.
- — (April 2020). Michael Pryor (ed.). "The Rise of Black Speculative Fiction". Aurealis. No. 129.
- — (11 May 2020). "Becoming Visible: The Rise of Black Speculative Fiction". Vector. British Science Fiction Association.
- — (10 June 2020). "The Benefit of Our Humanity". The Blue Nib. Archived from the original on 24 June 2021.
- — (24 May 2020). "I Went Looking for AfroSF". Vector. British Science Fiction Association.
- — (August 2020). Dirk Strasser (ed.). "Dark Fiction". Aurealis. No. 133.
- — (4 August 2020). "Afrofuturism: A WorldCon Recap, and Some Thoughts". Vector. British Science Fiction Association.
- — (27 August 2020). "The New Seduction of an Old Literary Crime Classic". LitHub.
- — (25 November 2020). "Inhabitation – Genni and I: Eugen Bacon on Black Speculative Fiction". Sydney Review of Books.
- — (3 January 2022). "Trends in Black Speculative Fiction". Fafnir. 8 (2). Finnish Society of Science Fiction and Fantasy Research.
- — (15 October 2024). "Mea Culpa". In Kadija George Sesay; Cheryl Robson (eds.). Encounters with James Baldwin: Celebrating 100 years. Supernova Books. ISBN 9781913641405.

== Awards and honors ==
Year	Work	Award	Category	Result	Reference
2019	"Horror and the paranormal", published in Writing Speculative Fiction	Australian Shadows Awards	Non-Fiction and Criticism	Finalist	
2020	Claiming T-Mo	Ditmar Award	Novel	Finalist	
2020	Claiming T-Mo	Nommo Award	Novel	Longlisted	
2020	"The Day Chivalry Died"	Nommo Award	Short Story	Longlisted	
2020	"A Good Ball"	Nommo Award	Short Story	Longlisted	
2020	Hadithi & the State of Black Speculative Fiction	Australian Shadows Awards	Edited Works	Finalist	
2020	Ivory's Story	BSFA Award	Short Fiction	Shortlisted	
2020	"A Pining"	Nommo Award	Short Story	Longlisted	
2020	Writing Speculative Fiction	Ditmar Award	Criticism or Review	Finalist	
2021	Claiming T-Mo	Nommo Award	Novel	Longlisted	
2021	Danged Black Thing	Aurealis Award	Collection	Shortlisted	
2021	Danged Black Thing	Australian Shadows Awards	Collected Works	Finalist	
2021	Danged Black Thing	Otherwise Award	—	Honor List	
2021	"The Failing Name"	BSFA Award	Short Fiction	Longlisted	
2021	Ivory's Story	Nommo Award	Novella	Longlisted	
2021	"The One Who Sees"	Nommo Award	Short Story	Longlisted	
2021	"The Road to Woop Woop"	Nommo Award	Short Story	Longlisted	
2021	"Still She Visits"	Nommo Award	Short Story	Longlisted	
2021	"A Visit in Whitechapel"	Nommo Award	Short Story	Longlisted	
2022	An Earnest Blackness	BSFA Award	Best Long Non-fiction	Longlisted	
2022	"The Failing Name"	World Fantasy Award	Short Fiction	Nominated	
2022	Mage of Fools	BSFA Award	Novel	Longlisted	
2023	Broken Paradise	BSFA Award	Shorter Fiction	Shortlisted	
2023	Broken Paradise	Shirley Jackson Award	Novella	Nominated	
2023	"The Devil Don’t Come with Horns"	World Fantasy Award	Short Fiction	Nominated	
2023	"Dominant Themes in Afro-Centric Fiction"	BSFA Award	Short Non-fiction	Shortlisted	
2023	An Earnest Blackness	British Fantasy Award	Non-Fiction	Won	
2023	An Earnest Blackness	Locus Award	Non-fiction	Finalist	
2023	Languages of Water	BSFA Award	Collection	Longlisted	
2023	"Paperweight"	BSFA Award	Short Fiction	Longlisted	
2023	"Sina, The Child With No Echo"	BSFA Award	Short Fiction	Longlisted	
2023	Year’s Best African Speculative Fiction 2022	BSFA Award	Collection	Longlisted	
2024	Afro-Centered Futurisms in Our Speculative Fiction	BSFA Award	Long Non-fiction	Longlisted	
2024	"An Afrofuturistic Dystopia and the Afro-irreal"	BSFA Award	Short Non-fiction	Shortlisted	
2024	Broken Paradise	Nommo Award	Novella	Shortlisted	
2024	Danged Black Thing	Philip K. Dick Award	—	Nominated	
2024	"Kizimbani"	BSFA Award	Short Fiction	Longlisted	
2024	"The Mystery of A Place Between Waking and Forgetting"	BSFA Award	Short Fiction	Longlisted	
2024	A Place Between Waking and Forgetting	BSFA Award	Collection	Longlisted	
2024	A Place Between Waking and Forgetting	Shirley Jackson Award	Single-Author Collection	Nominated	
2024	Serengotti	Victorian Premier's Literary Awards	Fiction	Shortlisted	
2024	"The Writer as an Agent of Change"	BSFA Award	Short Non-fiction	Longlisted	
2025	—N/a	Kate Wilhelm Solstice Award	—	Won	
2025	Afro-Centered Futurisms in Our Speculative Fiction	Ignyte Award	Creative Nonfiction	Won	
2025	Afro-Centered Futurisms in Our Speculative Fiction	Locus Award	Locus Award for Best Non-fiction	Won	
2025	"AI Chronicles: Properties of a Human Curse"	BSFA Award	Short Fiction	Longlisted	
2025	Fission #5	Aurealis Award	Anthology	Shortlisted	
2025	"Kinje'kitile and the Jintu"	BSFA Award	Short Fiction	Longlisted	
2025	"Ne'za's Yearning"	Aurealis Award	Young Adult Short Story	Shortlisted	
2025	The Nga'phandileh Whisperer	Aurealis Award	Horror Novella	Shortlisted	
2025	Novic	BSFA Award	Shorter Fiction	Longlisted	
2025	"The Shadow Eater of Órino-Rin'"	BSFA Award	Short Fiction	Longlisted	
2025	"Spec Fic and the Politics of Identity: Finding the Self in Other"	BSFA Award	Short Non-fiction	Won	
2026	Nga'phandileh Whisperer: A Sauútiverse Novella	British Fantasy Award	Novella	Shortlisted	

== See also ==
- The Westsider: Eugen Bacon on the Power of Storytelling
- HWA: Black Heritage in Horror - Interview with Eugen Bacon
- British Fantasy Society - Meet Eugen Bacon
- British Science Fiction Association - Interview: Eugen Bacon
