= Goliath (Onyebuchi novel) =

2022 novel by Tochi Onyebuchi

- First edition
- Author: Tochi Onyebuchi
- Language: English
- Genres: Dystopian, science fiction
- Publisher: Tor Books
- Publication date: January 25, 2022
- Publication place: United States
- Pages: 336
- ISBN: 9781250782953

Goliath is a 2022 science fiction novel by Nigerian American writer Tochi Onyebuchi. It is his first adult science fiction novel and it was first published in New York on January 25, 2022, by Tor Books.

== Background ==
In an interview by NPR, Onyebuchi stated most space movies on TV mostly show white people who are on spaceship terraforming Mars and that he had the idea of the novel when he thought about what happened to the all the Black and Brown people that were never depicted. He also noted that anime like Gundam Wing and Ghost In The Shell had inspired the novel.

== Reception ==
The book received generally positive receptions from book reviewers and readers alike. It was a New York Times editor's choice and one of the most anticipated books of 2022. It was recommended by several media outlets including USA Today, Bustle, BuzzFeed and Polygon.

A review by The New York Times noted that the book has "an ingenious premise", another review by Publishers Weekly called the novel a "gorgeous work". Beth Mowbray in a review for The Nerd Daily praised the novel stating that "in Goliath, Onyebuchi creates an alternate future which certainly reflects the issues of our own day and time."

Awards and honors
Year	Award	Category	Result	Ref
2022	Dragon Awards	Science Fiction Novel	Nominated	
2023	Locus Award	Science Fiction Novel	Finalist	
