= Cadwell Turnbull =

American author

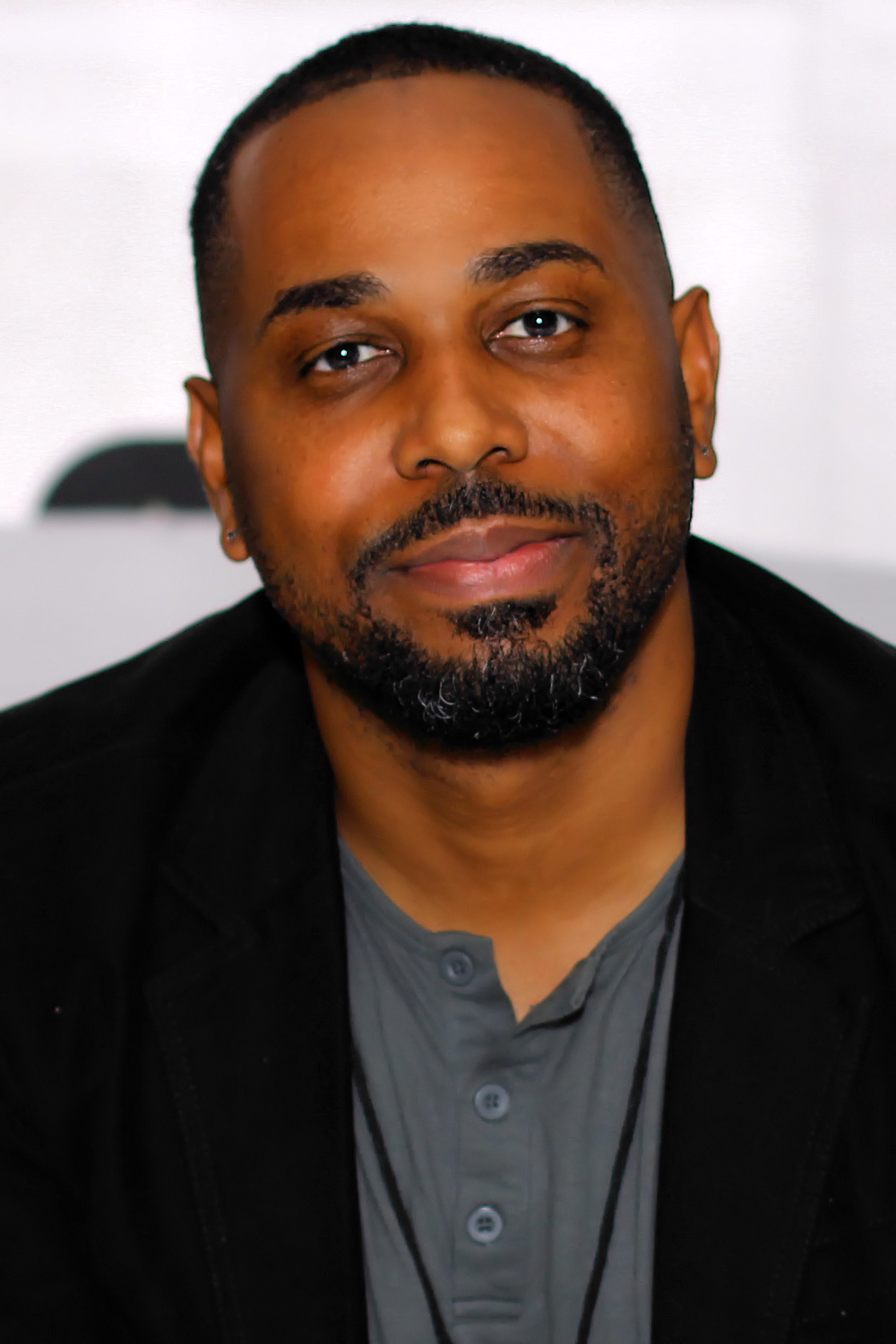
- Turnbull at the 2023 Texas Book Festival
- Born: August 12, 1987 (age 39); Chevy Chase, Maryland, USA
- Education: NC State University (MFA, MA); La Roche University (BA)
- Occupations: Novelist; short-story writer
- Writing career
- Genres: speculative fiction; science fiction; fantasy
- Website: cadwellturnbull.com darklylem.com

Cadwell Turnbull is an American science fiction and fantasy writer from the U.S. Virgin Islands. He is the author of award-winning short stories and novels, including The Lesson (2019) and No Gods, No Monsters (2021). Turnbull also co-writes under the pen name "Darkly Lem" with Josh Eure, Craig Lincoln, Ben Murphy, and M. Darusha Wehm.

== Biography ==
Turnbull was born on August 12, 1987 in Maryland, but moved with his parents when he was a month old and was raised in St. Thomas, U.S. Virgin Islands. He moved to Pittsburgh to attend La Roche University, where he received a BA in Professional Writing. He attended North Carolina State University for graduate school, where he studied under John Kessel and Wilton Barnhardt. He received an MFA in Creative Writing (Fiction) and an MA in English (Linguistics). He is a graduate of the 2016 Clarion West Writers Workshop.

== Works ==
Turnbull's short stories have appeared in Asimov’s Science Fiction, Lightspeed Magazine, and Nightmare Magazine. Two of his short stories have been read by LeVar Burton on the LeVar Burton Reads podcast. His short story "Loneliness Is in Your Blood" was selected for The Best American Science Fiction and Fantasy 2018 anthology, and his short story "Jump" was selected for The Year's Best Science Fiction and Fantasy 2019 anthology.

His debut novel, The Lesson, was nominated for multiple awards and won the Neukom Institute Literary Arts Award for speculative fiction in the "debut" category. His second novel, No Gods, No Monsters, was listed as one of the best books of 2021 by The New York Times, NPR, Audible, the New York Public Library, Kirkus Reviews, Library Journal, and Tor.com. His third novel, We Are the Crisis, was listed as one of the Best Science Fiction and Fantasy Books of 2023 and one of the Best Fiction Books of 2023 by Kirkus Reviews.

Many of his stories take place (at least partially) in his native U.S. Virgin Islands. His writing often addresses sociopolitical topics like colonialism and post-colonialism, marginalized communities, climate change, police violence, and collective ownership. He credits Ursula Le Guin as influential to his writing along with Octavia Butler, Ted Chiang, N. K. Jemisin, Alice Munro, and George Orwell.

== Bibliography ==
=== Novels ===
- The Lesson. (2019). Blackstone Publishing. ISBN 978-1538584644.

Convergence Saga

- No Gods, No Monsters. (2021). Blackstone Publishing. ISBN 978-1982603724.
- We Are the Crisis. (2023). Blackstone Publishing. ISBN 978-1982603755
- A Ruin, Great and Free. (2025). Blackstone Publishing. ISBN 978-1094175904

Formation Saga

- Transmentation Transience: Or, an Accession to the People's Council for Nine Thousand Worlds, by Darkly Lem. (2025). Blackstone Publishing. ISBN 979-8212186018

=== Collections ===
- All the Hidden Places. (2026). Blackstone Publishing. ISBN 979-8228018105

=== Short fiction ===
- "Loneliness Is in Your Blood". (2017). Nightmare Magazine.
- "A Third of the Stars of Heaven". (2017). Lightspeed Magazine.
- “Other Worlds and This One”. (2018). Lightspeed Magazine.
  - Originally printed (2017) in Asimov’s Science Fiction
- “When the Rains Come Back.” (2017). Lightspeed Magazine.
  - -- (2019). Featured on We Will Remember Freedom podcast.
- "They Built a Wall". (2018). Grassroots Economic Organizing.
- "Jump". (2019). Lightspeed Magazine.
  - -- (2019). Featured on LeVar Burton Reads podcast.
- "Monsters Come Howling in their Season". (2019). The Verge.
- "All the Hidden Places". (2019). Nightmare Magazine.
- "The Letters Triptych". (2020). In The Dystopia Triptych: Ignorance is Strength, Vol 1. Broach Reach Publishing and Adamant Press. ISBN 979-8677287572.
- "Mediation." (2020). In Entanglements: Tomorrow's Lovers, Families, and Friends. MIT Press. ISBN 978-0262539258.
- "Shock of Birth". (2021). Lightspeed Magazine.
  - -- (2021). Featured on LeVar Burton Reads podcast.
  - -- (2023). In Many Worlds, or The Simulacra. Radix Media. ISBN 978-1737718437
- "Killmonger Rising". (2021). In Black Panther: Tales of Wakanda. Titan Books. ISBN 978-1789095685.
- “Break the Skin If You Have To”, with Emma Osborne and Jess Essey (2022). Nightmare Magazine.
- “There, She Didn’t Need Air to Fill Her Lungs” Lost Worlds & Mythological Kingdoms. Grim Oak Press. ISBN 978-1944145798
- "Notes on the Forum of the Simulacra." (2023). In Many Worlds, or The Simulacra. Radix Media. ISBN 978-1737718437
- “Wandering Devil”. (2023). Out There Screaming: An Anthology of Black Horror. Penguin Random House.
- “A Tech Mage Comes to Visit”. (2023). Sunday Morning Transport.

=== Edited works ===
- Many Worlds, or The Simulacra, with Josh Eure (2023). Radix Media. ISBN 978-1737718437

== Awards ==
Year	Work	Award	Category	Result	Ref.
2019	The Lesson	Society of Voice Arts and Sciences	Fiction, Best Voiceover	Nominated	
2020	The Lesson	Audie Award	Science Fiction	Finalist	
2020	The Lesson	VCU First Novelist Award	—	Shortlisted	
2020	The Lesson	Massachusetts Book Award	Fiction	Longlisted	
2022	No Gods, No Monsters	Shirley Jackson Award	Novel	Finalist	
2022	No Gods, No Monsters	Locus Award	Fantasy Novel	Finalist	
2022	No Gods, No Monsters	Lambda Literary Award	Speculative Fiction	Won	
2024	We Are the Crisis	Ignyte Award	Adult Novel	Finalist	
