= The Language of Liars =

2026 science fiction novella

- Author: S. L. Huang
- Genre: Science fiction, adventure
- Publisher: Tordotcom
- Publication date: April 21, 2026
- Pages: 176
- ISBN: 978-1-250-40533-3

The Language of Liars is a 2026 science fiction novella set in outer space by S. L. Huang that explores themes of language, colonialism, and identity. The story follows Ro, a linguist, as he studies the Star Eater language in pursuit of "jumping" into one of their bodies through a psychic connection. In an interview with The Nerd Daily, Huang described the book as an "extremely nerdy linguistic alien space opera that has no humans in it at all."

== Inspiration ==
Huang enjoys learning and studying languages, inspiring the topic of The Language of Liars. At the same time, Huang wanted to write a book about the social damage that language study can induce. Huang was able to work out the plot in four hours after speaking with their editor. They have said that they enjoy that The Language of Liars doesn't fit neatly into any boxes.

== Plot ==
Ro is a Ponto, a non-human empathic species that inhabits the planet of Orro. Ro studies at a learning center named Warren in order to absorb the Star Eater language. Although he frequently skirts his responsibilities, Ro is a talented student. The Star Eaters are squid-like aliens that harvest meridian, a substance crucial to Ro's world. By learning their language, Ro may be able to "jump" into a Star Eater body and thus spy on them for his country.

After Ro finally makes the jump into a Star Eater body, he befriends two which he names You-In-Front and You-Outside. Star Eaters are known to suffer periods of disorientation and confusion, which Ro uses as his cover for his lack of everyday knowledge. Working to harvest meridian, Ro realizes that the Star Eater life is a lot harder than he had realized and his lessons failed to cover every aspect of Star Eater society. The Ponto on Orro request that he secretly steal meridian for them, which Ro hesitantly accepts. Scientists visit the Star Eaters to try to determine the cause of their infertility.

Ro realizes that You-Outside knew his Star Eater body before he took over it, and feels guilt. Meanwhile, You-In-Front gets in trouble for something Ro had done. These conflicts culminate in Ro's realization that every Star Eater he has met is not really a Star Eater, after all. Instead, they are all beings from other species that have jumped into the Star Eaters, effectively causing a genocide of the species. This is also the reason the Star Eaters haven't reproduced -- no one knows how to. The novella ends with Ro's decision to try to reconstruct the Star Eater culture and language so that it may live on in the future.

== Reception ==
Writing for Reactor, Jenny Hamilton says that The Language of Liars is impressively able to flesh out the world in less than 200 pages. However, her review was ultimately lukewarm, citing that the final twist did not make sense. Vanessa Fogg of Locus called The Language of Liars a "sharp, brilliant book with ambitious, high-concept world-building and ideas."

Fogg admits that the technical linguistic jargon may be a barrier to entry for some readers. Another review, by the writer and translator Kathryn Raver, appreciated the attention to detail and accuracy with the linguistic terminology.

== Related works ==
- Babel, or the Necessity of Violence by R. F. Kuang
