= Afro-Centered Futurisms in Our Speculative Fiction =

2024 anthology edited by Eugen Bacon

- Editor: Eugen Bacon
- Language: English
- Subject: Africanfuturism, Afrofuturism
- Genre: Literary criticism; speculative fiction
- Publisher: Bloomsbury Academic
- Publication date: 14 November 2024
- Publication place: United Kingdom
- Pages: 252 (Hardcover)
- Awards: 2025 Ignyte Award for Outstanding Creative Nonfiction; 2025 Locus Award for Best Non-fiction
- ISBN: 9798765114667

Afro-Centered Futurisms in Our Speculative Fiction is a 2024 anthology edited by Eugen Bacon. It contains essays regarding speculative fiction from the perspective of authors of African descent, including discussions of Africanfuturism, Afrofuturism, and related concepts. The book won the 2025 Ignyte Award for Outstanding Creative Nonfiction and the Locus Award for Best Non-fiction.

== Contents ==
1. Suyi Davies Okungbowa. "Afrocentric Futurisms—The Case for an Inclusive Expression." Nigeria/Canada
2. Stephen Embleton. "Cosmologies and Languages Building Africanfuturism." South Africa/UK
3. Eugen Bacon. "An Afrofuturistic Dystopia and the Afro-irreal." Tanzania/Australia
4. Nuzo Onoh. "The Power of African Spirituality in Africanfuturism." Nigeria/UK
5. Shingai Njeri Kagunda. "Black-Futurisms Vs. Systems of Domination." Kenya
6. Cheryl S. Ntumy. "Faith and Fantasy—Afrofuturist and Africanfuturist Spirituality." Ghana
7. Xan van Rooyen. "Queer Imaginings in Africanfuturism Inspired by African History." South African/Finland
8. Aline-Mwezi Niyonsenga. "Afrofuturism and Exploring Cultural Identity as a PRocess of Becoming." Rwanda/Australia
9. Tobi Ogundiran. "Fabulist Imaginins in Tales of the Dark and Fantastic." Nigeria/USA
10. Dilman Dila. "A Vision for Direct Democracy in Yat Madit." Uganda
11. Nerine Dorman. "A Gaze at Post-Colonial Themes That Re-Envision Africa." South Africa
12. Eugen Bacon. "Denouement: Autoethnography—The Self-As-Research." Tanzania/Australia

== Style ==
The work is composed of author-based chapters. Each chapter is paired with a scholarly inquiry and creative reflection written by Bacon.

== Reception and awards ==
Jenna N. Hanchey of Los Angeles Review of Books discussed the difficulty in finding terminology to encompass the wide range of creative work that falls under the umbrella of African speculative fiction. Authors involved in the anthology hold different views regarding the terminology of Afrofuturism (coined by white author Mark Dery) and Africanfuturism (coined by Nnedi Okorafor). Hanchey herself finds a unifying theme of the collection to be "sitting with grief."

Hanchey further explored the way in which colonialism influences the marketing of African works to Western audiences:

Maybe this is part of the reason some authors struggle with the white-assigned label of Afrofuturism, or the strictly defined contours separating Africanfuturism from Africanjujuism. Parceling narrative territory into clearly defined possessions that you either identify with or not is, when it comes down to it, a colonial means of thought. Through this lens, Afro-Centered Futurisms does something enormously important in its tensions and frictions, overlap and dispersal: it avoids the colonial logic that reduces an entire group of people to a flattened identity label, and instead asks readers to understand the complexity of their relations in the world.

Writing for Vector, Amirah Muhammad also discussed the terminology used to describe African speculative fiction. Muhammad wrote that "Instead of providing a final solution to this debate, the anthology pushes us to consider the terms Afrofuturism, Africanfuturism and Afro-centred Futurisms as a set of nested dolls; intimately connected but distinctly separate... It is less about finding a single, definitive label for African speculative endeavours, but more about the endeavours themselves — which, in their speculation, are always plural and open to evolution." The reviewer felt that the strength of the anthology was its nuance. The book allows readers to explore contradictory approaches simultaneously, which provides "effective analytical frameworks for key concerns in both writing and researching African speculative fiction."

A. S. Lewis of Strange Horizons compared the concept of Afro-fiction to a multifaceted gem rather than a monolith, noting that "this curated collection highlights the collective lived experiences of its authors while recognizing the individual voices found within the genre." Lewis further commented on Bacon's decision to include white South African authors in the collection, stating that "to separate white South African authors from the rest of the continent would be incompatible with truly 'afro-centered' futurism works." The review concluded that the volume "is a welcome introduction to viewing the broad scope of Black speculative fiction through the lens of a unique kind of unifying diversity."

Dike Okoro of World Literature Today called the book "unusually fascinating" and stated that it "offers the kind of energy and diversity in themes and topics that one expects from freethinking academics, writers, and artists." The review commented on the broad array of material covered in the anthology, which includes "popular culture, politics, society, gender, sexuality, spirituality, and African history." Okoro criticized the focus on Mark Dery and race, calling it "trite and not particularly interesting today."

Blessing Uwisike of Brittle Paper called the book "a significant contribution to scholarship on African speculative fiction" and noted that it examines the way in which African perspectives can reinvent storytelling.

The anthology won the 2025 Ignyte Award for Outstanding Creative Nonfiction and the 2025 Locus Award for Best Non-fiction.

Eugen Bacon's essay "An Afrofuturistic Dystopia and the Afro-irreal" was included in the anthology. It was shortlisted for the 2024 BSFA Award for Best Non-fiction (short).
