= Harmattan Season =

2025 novel by Tochi Onyebuchi

- Author: Tochi Onyebuchi
- Language: English
- Genre: Fantasy; noir fiction
- Set in: 20th century; West Africa
- Publisher: Tor Books
- Publication date: 27 May 2025
- Publication place: United States
- Pages: 228
- ISBN: 9781250782977

Harmattan Season is a 2025 novel by Tochi Onyebuchi. It follows the private investigator Boubacar as he investigates the disappearance of a bleeding woman, leading to the discovery of a larger conspiracy. It has received critical praise for its exploration of colonialism and its blending of multiple genres.

== Plot ==
The story takes place in an unnamed country in West Africa under French rule. Years ago, war between the French and the native population led to colonization and war crimes. Members of the native ethnic group are known as dugulenw (singular: dugulen) and are oppressed by the French. Those of mixed heritage, the deux-fois, occupy a space between both communities.

Boubacar is a deux-fois private investigator. He struggles with the psychological toll of his time in the sorodassi, a collaborationist colonial legion of dugulenw and deux-fois. During that service, Bouba committed war crimes against dugulenw.

One night, a woman bleeding from an abdominal wound stumbles into his apartment. Bouba hides her from the police in his closet, and she escapes before she is captured. Bouba is questioned by Moussa, a police officer and his former comrade in the sorodassi. Bouba begins investigating the mysterious woman. The woman's body is found in a public area; her corpse is levitating. Moussa explains to Bouba that this is the sixth recent case involving a floating body. All of the victims were dugulenw and missing an organ.

Bouba is forced to deliver mysterious cargo to a warehouse. He investigates the owner of the warehouse. During his investigation, an explosion destroys part of the French Quarter. Several city blocks are levitated, and numerous French citizens are killed. Bouba meets the Murutilen, a dugulen political candidate. The Murutilen opposes French colonial rule. He plans to form a Truth and Reconciliation Commission to investigate the war crimes committed against dugulenw.

Bouba learns that the mysterious woman who arrived in his apartment was named Hawa. She was a member of the Floaters, a radical splinter group aligned with, but more militant than, the Murutilen. The Floaters have learned that the removal of certain organs allows dugulenw to regain their ancestral ability to fly. These organs can also be used to create bombs.

Bouba is invited to a dinner hosted by developer Honoré Mirbeau de L’Isle-Adam, who is building apartments on the sites of wartime massacres. Bouba corners him and accuses him of owning the warehouse used in the delivery scheme. L’Isle-Adam plans to have the Murutilen assassinated so that his developments won't be torn down. Determined to stop the plot, Bouba warns the Murutilen, but the candidate refuses to abandon his campaign. Bouba infiltrates one of L’Isle-Adam's developments, detonating an organ bomb and revealing the mass grave. Moussa urges Bouba to stand down, fearing that exposure of sorodassi war crimes will destroy them both, but Bouba refuses.

Bouba implicates L’Isle-Adam in a plot to kill dugulenw, create bombs from their organs, and terrorize the population to influence the upcoming election. He also reveals that he can Float, despite not having any organs removed. Bouba confronts L’Isle-Adam; they discuss the war crimes that they have both committed. Moussa has been listening and arrests L’Isle-Adam.

The novel ends with a flashback from Hawa's perspective. On the night she dies, an injured Hawa plans to tell Bouba that she forgives him for killing her family during the war. She is interrupted by the police before she can speak. She escapes outside, and as she dies, her body begins to Float.

== Major themes ==
Abergale Shep of Grimdark Magazine commented on the way that the novel handles race. Shep stated that "Harmattan Season explores the intricacies of what it means to be mixed-race in a hegemonic society, never really knowing where you fit in and always feeling like you have to choose one side over the other." This is exemplified in the character of Bouba, whose inner turmoil is related to "being half-French and half indigenous Dugulen."

== Setting ==
Gary K. Wolfe wrote that "Onyebuchi provides little background on the historical setting, which seems to be Mali around the beginning of the 20th century, with gaslights and horsecarts, though Mali is never directly named, and its capital city Bamako is only mentioned when a character shows the narrator a map of those French housing developments."

== Reception and awards ==
In a starred review, Publishers Weekly wrote that the novel "[blends] elements of classic noir fiction (including a Chandleresque narrative voice) and fantastic acts of terroristic martyrdom..." The review called the novel "an unforgettable portrait of a place and a person trapped between two worlds and two cultures." Marlene Harris of Library Journal also gave the novel a starred review, calling it a "highly recommended hardboiled fantasy mystery." Harris recommended the novel for fans of the works of P. Djèlí Clark, Nnedi Okorafor, and Moses Ose Utomi.

Abergale Shep of Grimdark Magazine praised the novel's worldbuilding, stating that "as readers are taken through dark alleys, shisha parlours and Ethnic Quarters designed to house the indigenous population, they are witnesses to the injustices against marginalised communities everywhere." Shep concluded that the novel "perfectly balances its hard-boiled and fantasy-noir elements, and somehow still manages to blend in cultural nuances throughout."

Gary K. Wolfe of Locus commented on the way in which the story blurs genre lines. Wolfe stated that "The novel’s opening scene ... is pure hard-boiled PI fiction reminiscent of the Dashiell Hammett mode..." Wolfe later commented that "Despite its hardboiled trappings and its almost Gothic (but judiciously employed) fantasy elements, Harmattan Season mixes genres in a way not quite like any other novel I’ve read." Similarly, Alex Brown of Reactor stated that the novel "blends hardboiled detective noir with fantasy with alternate history, and the resulting mix is something wholly original." Brown stated that "Each year there are a handful of books that truly deserve to be called a “must-read," and this, without a doubt, is one of them."

The novel was nominated for the 2026 Ignyte Award for Outstanding Adult Novel.
