= Vida Cruz-Borja =

Filipina author

- Born: Vida Cruz
- Occupation: Writer
- Writing career
- Language: English
- Genre: Speculative fiction
- Notable works: Song of the Mango and Other New Myths
- Notable awards: 2022 Ignyte Award for Outstanding Creative Nonfiction

Vida Cruz-Borja (née Cruz) is a Filipina author of essays, short stories, and long-form fiction.

== Career ==
In 2018, she was awarded a Tiptree Fellowship.

Cruz-Borja published her first fantasy short story collection, Beyond the Line of Trees, in 2019.

With the help of teammates L.D. Lewis, Brent Lambert, and Iori Kusano, Cruz-Borja established FIYAHCON. This event, hosted by FIYAH Literary Magazine, honors Black, Indigenous, and People of Color (BIPOC) writers. For this, Cruz-Borja was a joint finalist for the 2021 Hugo Award for Best Related Work. She became the fifth Filipino to be nominated for the award, and the first to be based in the Philippines.

Her 2022 collection Song of the Mango and Other New Myths received critical attention. Zhui Ning Chang of the British Science Fiction Association called Cruz-Borja "a key voice in contemporary Philippine speculative fiction." Kristy Wang of Strange Horizons wrote that the collection encapsulates the author's desire to build a better world, "and she threads this passion through her stories, whether they envision justness and equity on a societal level or within the life of an individual or individuals."

In a review for the Daily Tribune, Amelia Clarissa de Luna Monasterial discussed Cruz-Borja's 2025 novella Mirror Marked. The reviewer praised the novella for its non-linear storytelling and multiple points of view. The reviewer also felt that the book's queer characters were well-developed and portrayed positively.

== Works ==
Novellas

- Mirror Marked. PS Publishing. 1 August 2025. ISBN 9781803945262.

Collections

- Beyond the Line of Trees. Self-published. 1 August 2019.
- Song of the Mango and Other New Myths. Ateneo de Manila University Press. 9 December 2022. ISBN 9786214482276.

Short fiction

- "To Megan, with Half My Heart". The Silliman Journal. 52. Silliman University.
- "Odd and Ugly". Writers of the Future. 34. Galaxy Press. 2018.
- "Have Your #Hugot Harvested At This Diwata-Owned Cafe". Strange Horizons. May 2020.
- "Child of Two Worlds". The Magazine of Fantasy and Science Fiction. November–December 2022.

Non-fiction

- "Activist SFF Isn’t Just About Good Intentions." The SFWA Bulletin, Winter/Spring 2021
- "We Are the Mountain: A Look at the Inactive Protagonist." Fantasy Magazine, August 2021
  - Later collected in: Deepa Anappara; Taymour Soomro, eds. (9 March 2023). Letters to a Writer of Color. Vintage. ISBN 9781529115840.
- "Where Do Stories Begin?" Gabriela Lee; et al., eds. (1 January 2024). Mapping New Stars: A Sourcebook on Philippine Speculative Fiction. University of the Philippines Press. ISBN 9786210900668.

== Awards and honors ==
Cruz-Borja was a joint finalist for the 2021 Hugo Award for Best Related Work, for FIYAHCON. Her essay "We Are the Mountain: A Look at the Inactive Protagonist" won the 2022 Ignyte Award for Outstanding Creative Nonfiction.
