= LeVar Burton Reads =

Story reading podcast

- Genre: Short story; literary; speculative fiction
- Language: English

Creative team
- Created by: LeVar Burton
- Written by: Various

Cast and voices
- Hosted by: LeVar Burton

Publication
- No. of episodes: 207
- Original release: June 13, 2017 – May 6, 2024
- Provider: Stitcher

Reception
- Ratings: 4.76

Related
- Website: www.levarburtonpodcast.com

LeVar Burton Reads was a podcast hosted by LeVar Burton, where he read a piece of short fiction and shared his thoughts on it. Following its launch in 2017, it won numerous awards and received favorable reviews.

== Description ==
Burton is well-known for his acting career, which included Roots and Star Trek: The Next Generation, and also for hosting Reading Rainbow, a long-running children’s television show on PBS. In reviews, LeVar Burton Reads has been described as “Reading Rainbow for adults.”

In each 30-45-minute episode, Burton reads a short work of fiction. Music and sound design are added to create a full sensory experience. “What audio storytelling does is it engages the listener in a way that visual storytelling does not. You are creating the visuals for yourself, and because of that additional level of personal investment, it’s enjoyable on a different level,” Burton told The Verge.

Burton and his producer choose all the stories based on personal taste. “The primary consideration for a story to be selected is that I love it,” he told Los Angeles. The show has included works by Stephen King, Toni Morrison, Kurt Vonnegut, Octavia Butler, Neil Gaiman, Joan Aiken, Haruki Murakami, Nnedi Okorafor, John Chu, and Oscar Casares, among others.

The podcast concluded on May 6, 2024, with Burton reading "The Toynbee Convector" by Ray Bradbury as his final selection. After sharing his thoughts on the story, Burton delivered a farewell message encouraging listeners to "keep reading, keep expanding, keep living in your imaginations; that is the fuel that is going to power the commitment necessary to dream big and change the world."

In 2025, Wil Wheaton released his own similar podcast titled It's Storytime with Wil Wheaton after asking for and obtaining Burton's blessing.

== Reception ==
LeVar Burton Reads has been well received by USA Today, The New Yorker, The Washington Post, The Verge, NPR, Los Angeles and many other publications.

The show has won multiple industry awards, including the 2023 and 2024 Webby Award for Best Art and Culture Podcast, the 2023 NAACP Image Award for Outstanding Podcast and the 2020 Ignyte Award for Best Fiction Podcast. His 5-word Webby acceptance speech for his 2023 Webby Award was, “Be a better person. Read.”
