= S. A. Chakraborty =

American fantasy writer

Shannon Chakraborty
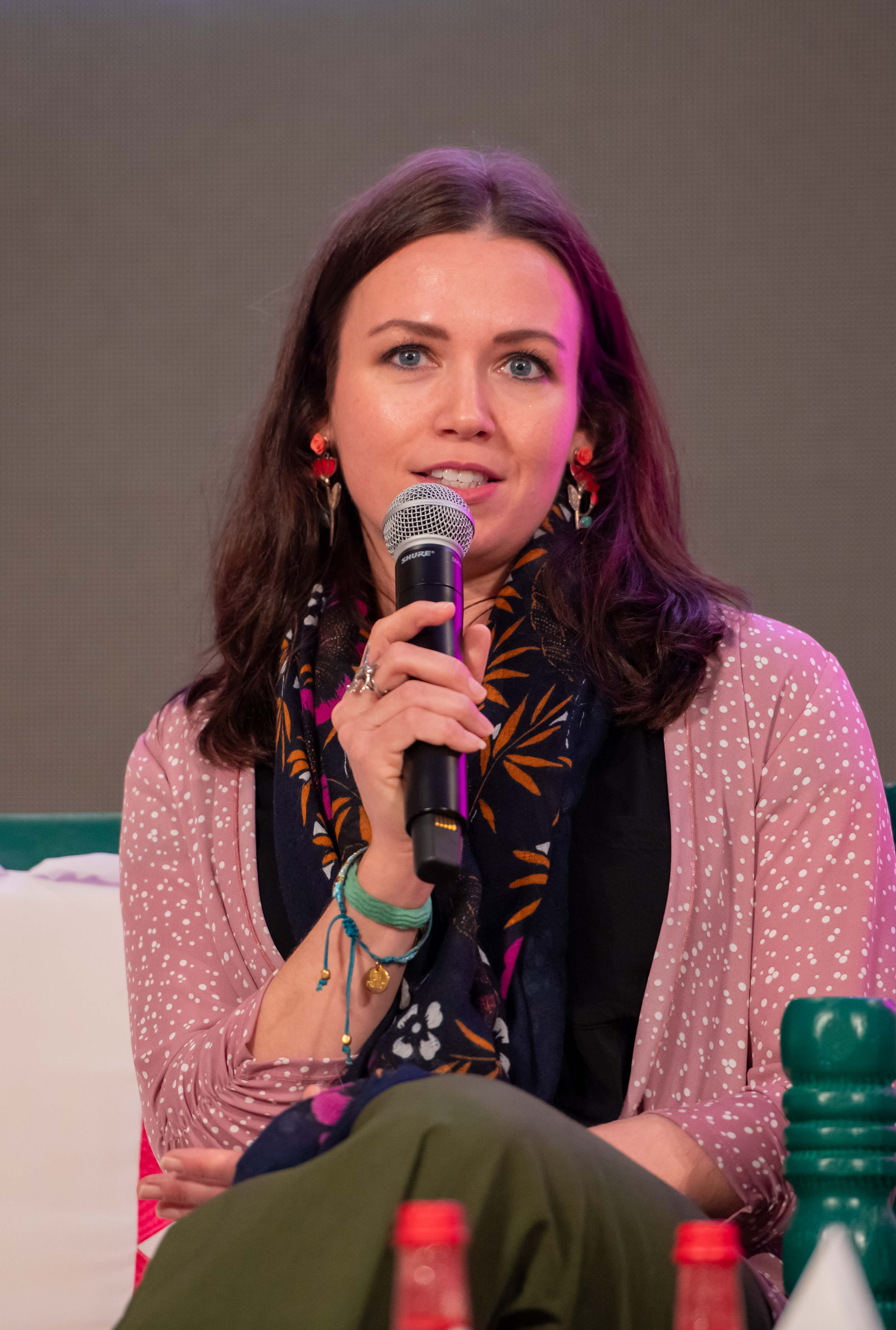
- Born: December 7, 1985 (age 40); New Jersey, U.S.
- Children: 2
- Writing career
- Period: 2017–present
- Genre: Historical fantasy
- Notable works: The City of Brass; The Kingdom of Copper; The Empire of Gold; The Adventures of Amina al-Sirafi
- Website: sachakraborty.com

Shannon Chakraborty (born December 7, 1985) is an American historical fantasy and speculative fiction writer based in New Jersey, best known for The Daevabad Trilogy.

== Career ==
Chakraborty's debut novel, The City of Brass, was published in 2017 and was nominated for several science fiction and fantasy awards, including the Crawford Award, Compton Crook Award, Locus Award, British Fantasy Award, and World Fantasy Award. The sequel, The Kingdom of Copper, was published to critical acclaim in 2019. Later that year Chakraborty was named a finalist for the John W. Campbell Award. The final installment in the Daevabad trilogy, The Empire of Gold, was released in June 2020. The River of Silver: Tales From the Daevabad Trilogy, a collection of stories taking place in the fictional world of Daevabad, came out in 2022.

Chakraborty's next trilogy, pitched as Ocean's Eleven meets Pirates of the Caribbean, is set in the 12th-century Indian Ocean. In the series debut, The Adventures of Amina al-Sirafi, an infamous retired pirate returns to her old profession when she is offered the chance to right a wrong from her past and gain a fabled treasure. It was published in February 2023 by Harper Voyager and debuted on The New York Times Best Seller list. The audiobook, narrated by Lameece Issaq and Amin El Gamal, was selected for the 2024 RUSA Listen List.

=== Adaptations ===
In May 2020, it was announced that Complete Fiction had optioned The Daevabad Trilogy for Netflix.

== Personal life ==
Chakraborty was born in New Jersey and raised there by Catholic parents. She converted to Islam in her teens. She originally intended to be a historian specializing in the Middle East; however, the 2008 financial crisis derailed those plans, so while she worked to support herself and her husband, she also started writing what she called "historical fan fiction" that later became The City of Brass.

The "A" in "S.A." is for her eldest daughter.

She lives in New Jersey with her husband and children.

== Bibliography ==
=== The Daevabad Trilogy ===
1. The City of Brass (2017) ISBN 978-0062678119
2. The Kingdom of Copper (2019) ISBN 978-0062678133
3. The Empire of Gold (2020) ISBN 978-0008239497

=== Amina al-Sirafi ===
1. The Adventures of Amina al-Sirafi (2023) ISBN 978-0062963505
2. The Tapestry of Fate (2026) ISBN 978-0-00-838139-4

=== Short fiction ===
1. "The Djinn" (2011) (as S. Ali), published in Expanded Horizons issue 29, June 2011
2. "Yerushalom" (2011) (as S. Ali), published in Crossed Genres issue 31, July 2011
3. "Bilaadi" (2012) (as S. Ali), published in The Future Fire, February 2012

=== Collections ===
1. The River of Silver: Tales From the Daevabad Trilogy (2022) ISBN 978-0063093737
