= The City of Brass (novel) =

2017 novel by S.A. Chakraborty

- Author: S. A. Chakraborty
- Language: English
- Series: The Daevabad Trilogy
- Release number: 1
- Genre: Fantasy
- Publisher: HarperVoyager
- Publication date: 2017
- Publication place: United States
- Pages: 532
- ISBN: 0062678108
- OCLC: 1017602412
- Followed by: The Kingdom of Copper

The City of Brass is a fantasy novel inspired by Middle Eastern folklore written by American author S. A. Chakraborty. It is the first of The Daevabad Trilogy, followed by The Kingdom of Copper in 2019 and The Empire of Gold in 2020.

== Publication ==
The City of Brass was published by HarperCollins subsidiary HarperVoyager, on November 14, 2017. It is five-hundred and thirty-two pages long, features illustrations and maps, and is printed in hardcover and paperback, and available in digital download. The press release describes the story as "an imaginative alchemy of The Golem and the Jinni, The Grace of Kings, and Uprooted, in which the future of a magical Middle Eastern kingdom rests in the hands of a clever and defiant young con artist with miraculous healing gifts." When asked about writing the novel in an interview for The Huffington Post, Chakraborty explains that it "began as a world-building experiment... the world that became The City of Brass–one I imagined djinn might have created by combining their nature and the influences of the particular human societies they lived amongst. It became a game with history and folklore providing the rules: I had to abide by what existed, but could imagine beyond that. For example, we have a few mentions of the Prophet Suleiman punishing djinn but not much beyond that. So, I tried to imagine what happened next: how that might have shaped their religion and politics... as well as dividing them."

== Plot ==
The book begins in 18th-century Cairo and follows Nahri, a talented orphan con woman who uses palm reading and sleight of hand to swindle Ottoman nobles, and has magical healing powers she keeps secret. During an exorcism, she accidentally summons a mysterious djinn warrior named Darayavahoush e-Afshin, "Dara" for short. Recognizing her healing powers as belonging to the long-dead Nahids, a powerful magical family and ancient rulers of the djinn, he takes her on a journey to Daevabad, the city her ancestors built. Along the way they meet powerful magical creatures that are out to either help them or kill them, and their flight to Daevabad becomes one of survival. They grow close as Dara tells Nahri of the magical world she never believed in, and reveals its many prejudiced and political complications while trying to hide his own role in it.

The story also follows Alizayd al Qahtani, "Ali" for short; a devout Muslim and second son of the djinn king whose family currently rules Daevabad, and whose ancestors had violently overthrown the Nahids thousands of years in the past. Ali and his family are of the Geziri djinn tribe. Since childhood, Ali has been trained at Daevabad's Citadel to be the Qaid, the military leader who will support his elder brother Emir Muntadhir, who is in line for the throne. Torn between loyalty to his royal family and his strong sense of justice, Ali is dismayed by his family's and in general Daevabad's culture of oppressing shafit, djinns who are partly human. He secretly supports the rebel group Tanzeem, an organization whose members fight against the oppression and cruelty leveled against shafit by the pureblooded djinn.

The city and its many djinn tribes is a kindling box that King Ghassan al Qahtani holds together with an iron fist, and Nahri and Dara's arrival in Daevabad threatens to set it all on fire. Both as Nahri as the return of a Nahid healer that revitalizes her Daeva tribe that revered the Nahids and resented the djinn, and Dara as the ancient warrior whose brutality in the war 1400 years ago is still remembered and feared by present-day djinn. Nahri learns more about the healing arts, her new role as leader of the Daevas, and the complicated politics of the city, while Ali learns more about the corruption and prejudices of the city and his family's role in it. Dara meanwhile leaves the city with a group of djinn soldiers and Emir Muntadhir to chase rumors of ifrit sightings and is gone for months.

Ali's connection to the Tanzeem comes to light and King Ghassan forces him to become friends with Nahri, in hopes of increasing the chances of marrying Nahri to Ali's elder brother Muntadhir. By uniting the Qahtani and Nahid families, Ghassan hopes that it will put to past their ancient tribal hate. Nahri initially welcomes Ali's friendship only to gain political advantage, but they slowly begin to actually warm up and bond as actual friends. Ali teaches Nahri how to read and how to use fire magic, while she tells Ali stories of home and helps him improve his Arabic. Nahri's healer mentor Nisreen criticizes this development, seeing her friendship with Ali as a betrayal to the Daevas, whose rule Ali's ancestors overthrew.

Complications rise as Dara returns. Nahri learns of the plot to marry her to Muntadhir. Ali has a falling out with the Tanzeem and is nearly assassinated by one of their members, only managing to survive after Nahri rescues him. Muntadhir begins to truly question his brother's loyalty. As Nahri considers her life in the city and the future she wants to build, she makes a decision and goes to King Ghassan to barter for own bride price. Tensions boil over with the men later that night and a fight breaks out between Muntadhir, Ali and Dara. Dara makes moves to take Nahri away from the Qahtanis and Daevabad.

Nahri refuses to escape with Dara and the life she's trying to build in Daevabad. Ali intervenes. Their battle ends with Dara threatening to kill Ali if Nahri doesn't agree to flee with him, and Nahri concedes. Ali is taken prisoner, and the three make their way to a secret boat by the lake shore. Their escape is soon interrupted by a hidden warship full of soldiers, led by Muntadhir and his close companion Jamshid, a Daeva and son of Daevabad's grand wazir. A massacre ensues when Nahri unintentionally unleashes Dara's slave powers. Dara kills nearly everyone on the ship, seemingly including Ali, who falls overboard into Daevabad's magical lake, which is long rumored to tear djinn flesh into pieces. Dara also severely injures Jamshid.

Still on the boat, Nahri talks Dara down and agrees to escape with him. Ali re-emerges from the lake. Possessed by powerful mythical water beings known as marid, Ali kills Dara as a horrified Nahri watches.

In the aftermath, King Ghassan retaliates against both the shafit in his search for those related to the Tanzeem and the Daevas and those who helped Dara's escape attempt or even question his death. Ali survives is banished to Am Gezira in part for his role in supporting the Tanzeem, and in part to hide his uncontrolled water magic, a result of his marid possession. Muntadhir renounces Ali and grieves Jamshid while resenting Nahri and his marriage to her. Nahri deeply struggles with Dara's death, and has a meeting with King Ghassan where they continue their previous marriage agreement and is told about Dara and what happened in Qui-zi. She later is forced to denounce Dara to a gathered crowd of Daeva nobles who show deference to her, much to Ghassan's discontent. Kaveh and Nisreen discuss Jamshid and the Daeva situation, and hint how things could change if they can get Dara's recovered slave ring to Manizheh e-Nahid.

== Reception ==
The novel was listed in Best Books of the Year by multiple media outlets, such as Library Journal, Vulture, The Verge and SyfyWire. In a review in The New York Times, columnist Suzanne Joinson said "it's clear that Chakraborty has great fun alluding to these tales," and continues "most enjoyable is the gusto with which everything is thrown into her story, from massacres to zombies to djinns." A review by Paul Di Filippo in Locus compared the novel with One Thousand and One Nights in terms of its imagery and storylines, and summarizes by writing "with its blend of royal politesse, djinnish magic, human loves and fears, and Middle Eastern Machiavellianism, The City of Brass offers pleasures worthy of Scheherazade." Mahvesh Murad writes at Tor.com, "to most (western?) readers whose only experience of the djinn is Disney, The City of Brass is going to be a lush, entertaining fable inspired by Middle Eastern and Islamic folklore that has just enough familiar elements to not be considering worrying alien, and yet is exotic enough to thrill and entice and tick off diversity boxes in the right way."

=== Awards ===
The City of Brass was a finalist for several science fiction and fantasy awards, including the Crawford Award, Locus Award, British Fantasy Award, World Fantasy Award, and won the Booknest.eu award for best Debut Novel. Chakraborty narrowly missed the final ballot for the John W. Campbell award by a single vote.

Awards
Year	Award	Category	Result	Ref.
2018	Crawford Award		Shortlisted	
2018	Locus Award	Best Fantasy Novel	Nominated	
2018	British Fantasy Award	Best Newcomer (Sydney J. Bounds Award)	Nominated	
2018	World Fantasy Award	Novel	Nominated	
2019	John W. Campbell Award for Best New Writer		Nominated	

== Adaption ==
As of 2020, the series had been optioned by Edgar Wright's, Nira Park's, Joe Cornish's and Rachael Prior's production company Complete Fiction, for the streaming service Netflix.
