= Tochi Onyebuchi =

American science fiction writer (born 1987)

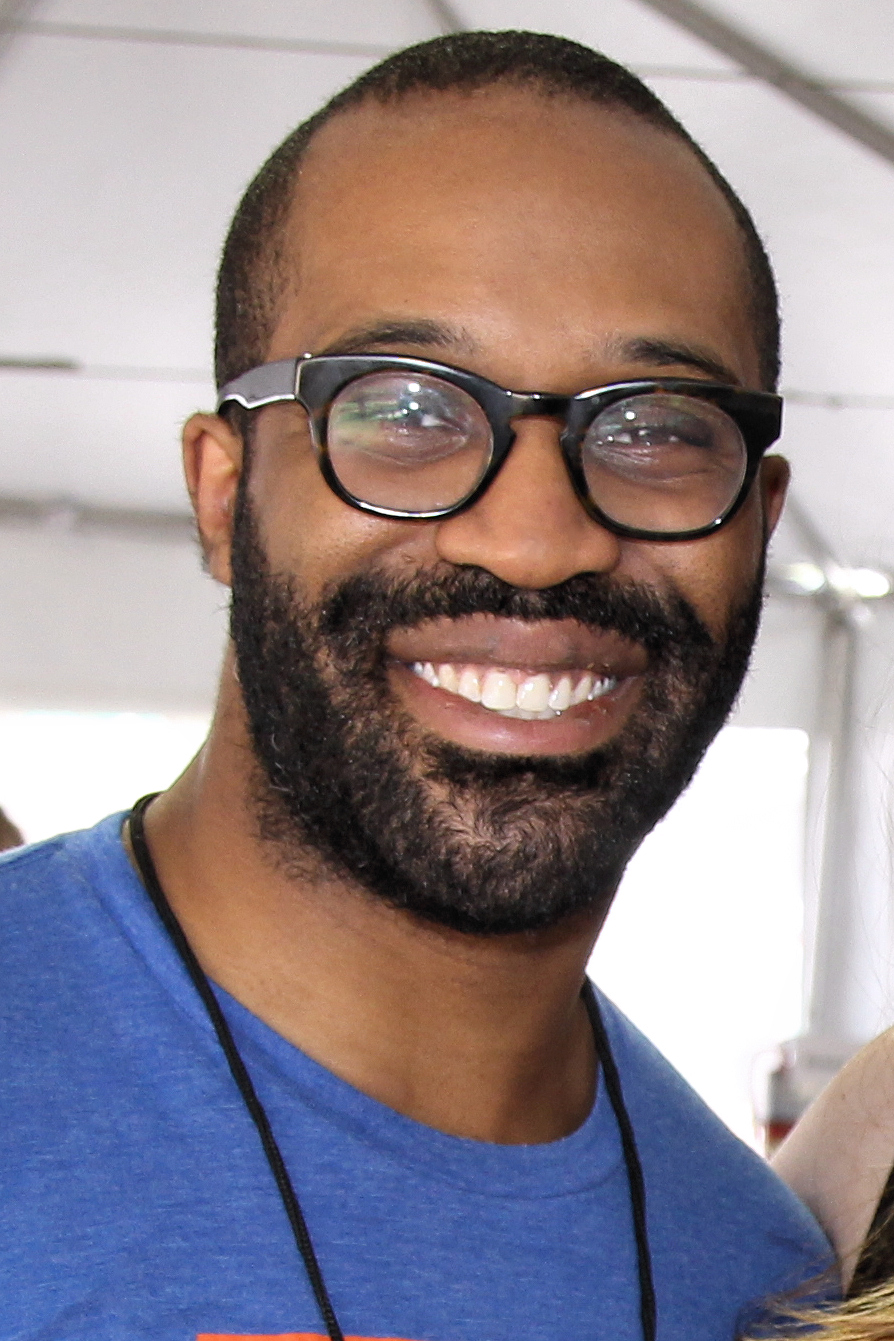
- Onyebuchi at the 2017 Texas Book Festival
- Born: October 4, 1987 (age 39); Northampton, Massachusetts, U.S.
- Education: Yale University; Tisch School of the Arts; Instituts d'études politiques; Columbia Law School
- Occupations: Author, lawyer
- Writing career
- Years active: 2017–present
- Genres: Fantasy, science fiction, young adult, Afrofuturist
- Notable works: Beasts Made of Night (2017); War Girls (2019); Riot Baby (2020)
- Website: www.tochionyebuchi.com

Tochi Onyebuchi (born October 4, 1987) is an American science fiction and fantasy writer and former civil rights lawyer. His 2020 novella Riot Baby received an Alex Award from the American Library Association, the Ignyte Award for Best Novella, and the World Fantasy Award for Best Novella in 2021. He is known for incorporating civil rights and Afrofuturism into his stories and novels.

== Early life and education ==
Onyebuchi was born in Northampton, Massachusetts, United States. His parents were Nigerian Igbo immigrants Elizabeth Ihuegbu and Nnamdi Onyebuchi, who was a restaurant manager. His first name means "praise God" in Igbo.

His family lived in New Britain, Connecticut, until 1998, when his father died at the age of 39. His family then moved to Newington, Connecticut, to a mostly white neighborhood. He attended the Choate Rosemary Hall school in Wallingford, Connecticut.

He says: "Growing up as the son of Nigerian immigrants, I always felt like I was in a position where I didn't completely identify as an African-American; I can trace my family eight generations back, but I'm not fully Nigerian, because I was born in America. I operate in that sort of in-between space."

As a youth, Onyebuchi was an avid reader and was strongly influenced by X-Men comics, especially the character of Black Panther. While he appreciated works by black authors he was required to read in high school, such as Their Eyes Were Watching God, Invisible Man and Native Son, he preferred adventure and science fiction stories. His favorite book was the manga series Blade of the Immortal.

In high school, he studied abroad for a year in France, where he fell in love with Alexandre Dumas's The Count of Monte Cristo, and was inspired when he learned Dumas was of African ancestry. Onyebuchi wrote extensively growing up and attempted to sell his first novel in high school.

In 2009, he earned a Bachelor's degree in political science from Yale University, where he was a member of the fraternity of St. Anthony Hall. He also spent a summer in Morocco learning Arabic.

He later earned his Master of Fine Arts in screenwriting from New York University's Tisch School of the Arts. While getting his MFA, he worked as a digital media intern for Marvel Comics.

Onyebuchi also received a Master's degree in Global Economic Law from Instituts d'études politiques in France. In 2015, he received his Juris Doctor from Columbia Law School. There, he "got woke" about the differences between the lives of white and black Americans.

== Career ==
After law school, Onyebuchi was licensed with the New York Bar and began a career in civil rights law. He worked in the Civil Rights Bureau of the New York State Attorney General's Office and was also an investigator for New York City's Legal Aid Society where he assisted prisoners from Rikers Island. He said, "This brought me to the edge of burnout. I wanted to remain involved in those issues, but away from the constant grind. I realized I didn't have the stamina for it."

From 2017 to 2019, he worked at a high-tech firm as a domain expert. He would use his two-hour daily commute on the train as time to write. In 2019, he left his job to devote his time to writing.

=== Novels and stories ===
Onyebuchi began writing novels and submitting them to publishers when he was in high school. When his first 16 novels were rejected, he decided to move on to a new project rather than to edit and resubmit. Because of this process, he had written 17 novels in 15 years. About a year after law school, he signed a contract to write two young adult novels.

His first published novel, Beasts Made of Night (2017), was written for young adult readers and is set in a mythical dystopian world inspired by Nigerian folklore. School Library Journal wrote: "Onyebuchi's world-building is strong, and the details leap off the page; readers will witness the poverty, smell the delicious food, and feel the physical pain of being a sin-eater." Time wrote: "This balancing act of thrill and inquiry promises to make the 33-year-old Onyebuchi a power player in the YA world in the years to come." Beast of Night won the 2018 Ilube Nommo Award for Novel by an African. He published a sequel, Crown of Thunder, in 2018.

He then wrote the War Girls young adult series, which includes War Girls in 2019 and Rebel Sisters in 2020. The setting for War Girls is Nigeria of 2172, but using historical events such as the Biafran War. School Library Journal wrote that War Girls was "A bleak but compulsively readable story with high action and high drama in equal measure".

In 2020, he published Riot Baby, revolving around Kev, born during the 1992 Los Angeles riots and his sister who possesses telekinetic powers. Onyebuchi drew on his experience as a lawyer in setting much of the novel at Rikers Island in New York, where Kev is wrongfully incarcerated. His inspiration for the novel came from the deaths of Michael Brown, Eric Garner, and Trayvon Martin and the lack of indictments of the police officers who killed them. He says, "I felt a rage born of impotence. At the same time, as a writer, I clung to this idea of writers as alchemists—that we can take pain and anger and rage and sorrow and turn it into a work of art that will alleviate this crippling sense of loneliness." Riot Baby won the Alex Award for young adult fiction from the American Library Association, the Ignyte Award for best novella, and the World Fantasy Award for best novella. Riot Baby was also a finalist for the 2021 Hugo Award for Best Novella.

In 2022, Onyebuchi's first adult science fiction novel, Goliath, was published by Tor Books. He started working on this novel before writing Beasts Made of Night. Goliath is set in the year 2050 when the wealthy have moved to space colonies, leaving the poor behind in the crumbling remains of Earth. Through his novel, Onyebuchi critiques income inequality, gentrification, and racism. Publishers Weekly wrote that it was "urgent, gorgeous work". It was selected as The New York Times Editors' Choice Pick and one of "5 Books Not to Miss" by USA Today, and was a nominee for Best Science Fiction Novel in the 2022 Dragon Awards.

His stories have appeared in several anthologies and Asimov's Science Fiction, Ideomancer, Lightspeed, Omenauna Magazine, and Uncanny Magazine.

=== Non-fiction ===
In his 2021 non-fiction work (S)kinfolk, Onyebuchi writes about the impact that reading Chimamanda Ngozi Adichie's novel Americanah had on him, as the child of Nigerian immigrants who did not see a himself reflected in a novel until the age of 26. Publishers Weekly, characterizing (S)kinfolk as a "moving blend of criticism and memoir", observed: "Readers familiar with Americanah will appreciate the author's insight, and those new to it will find Onyebuchi's masterful integration of anecdote and criticism accessible. Full of fresh perspective, this is an eye-opener."

=== Comics ===
Onyebuchi's first comic was a Domino story for the anthology Marvel's Voices: Legacy. One reviewer noted, "Tochi Onyebuchi writes one of the most effective Domino stories ever..."

In 2021, Marvel announced that Onyebuchi would be writing a new comics series titled Black Panther Legends, focused on the origin of the Black Panther, with illustrations by Setor Fiadzigbey. A long-time fan of comics, Onyebuchi said his response to this project was: "'Is this real? Is this really happening?' ...I still can't totally process that I am writing a Black Panther book for Marvel."

In 2022, Onyebuchi wrote a Captain America preview comic titled Captain America #0, alongside Collin Kelly and Jackson Lanzig, It was illustrated by Mattia De Iluis. Onyebuchi went on to write Captain America: Symbol of Truth, with art by R. B. Silva.

=== Video games ===
In 2021, Onyebuchi was among the writers of Call Of Duty: Vanguard video game developed by Sledgehammer Games and published by Activision.

== Personal life ==
Onyebuchi resides in New Haven, Connecticut.

== Awards and honors ==
Year	Work	Award	Category	Result	Ref.
2018	Beasts Made of Night	Nommo Award	Novel	Won	
2020	War Girls	Ignyte Award	Young Adult Novel	Finalist	
2020	War Girls	Locus Award	Young Adult Book	Finalist	
2020	War Girls	Nommo Award	Novel	Finalist	
2020	Riot Baby	Nebula Award	Novella	Finalist	
2021	Riot Baby	Alex Award	—	Won	
2021	Riot Baby	Hugo Award	Novella	Finalist	
2021	Riot Baby	Ignyte Award	Novella	Won	
2021	Riot Baby	Locus Award	Novella	Finalist	
2021	Riot Baby	NAACP Image Award	Literature - Fiction	Finalist	
2021	Riot Baby	Nommo Award	Novella	Finalist	
2021	Riot Baby	World Fantasy Award	Novella	Won	
2021	#PublishingPaidMe	Ignyte Award	Community Award	Won (Note: Shared with L.L. McKinney)	
2021	"Fine Weather, Isn't It?"	Ignyte Award	Creative Nonfiction	Finalist	
2021	"I Have No Mouth, and I Must Scream: The Duty of the Black Writer During Times of American Unrest"	Ignyte Award	Creative Nonfiction	Won	
2022	Goliath	Dragon Awards	Science Fiction Novel	Nominated	
2023	Goliath	Locus Award	Science Fiction Novel	Finalist	
2026	Racebook: A Personal History of the Internet	Locus Award	Non-fiction	Finalist	
2026	Harmattan Season	Ignyte Award	Adult Novel	Finalist	

== Published works ==
=== Novels and novellas ===
- — (January 21, 2020). Riot Baby (Hardcover ed.). Tor Books. ISBN 9781250214751.
- — (January 25, 2022). Goliath (Hardcover ed.). Tor Books. ISBN 9781250782953.
- — (May 27, 2025). Harmattan Season. Tor Books. ISBN 9781250782984.

=== Young adult novels ===
==== Beasts Made of Night series ====
- Beasts Made of Night. Razorbill, 2017. ISBN 9780448493909
- Crown of Thunder. Razorbill, 2018. ISBN 9780448493930

==== War Girls series ====
- War Girls. Razorbill, 2019. ISBN 9780451481672
- Rebel Sisters. Razorbill, 2020. ISBN 9781984835062

=== Comics ===
- Black Panther Legends, Marvel Comics, 2021. ISBN 9781302931414
- Legends Black Panther Legends #1, Marvel Comics, 2021.
- Black Panther Legends #2, Marvel Comics, 2021.
- Black Panther Legends #3, Marvel Comics, 2022.
- Black Panther Legends #4, Marvel Comics, 2022.
- Marvel's Voices: Legacy volume 1. various authors. Marvel, February 1, 2022. ISBN 9781302928148
- Captain America: Symbol of Truth #1-14, 750, Marvel Comics, 2022.

=== Short stories in anthologies ===
- "Still Life with Hammers, a Broom, and a Brick Stacker", Obsidian: Speculating Futures: Black Imagination & The Arts. Downstate Legacies, 2016. ISBN 9780997404142
- "Samson and the Delilah's", Black Enough: Stories of Being Young & Black in America (ed. Ibi Zoboi), HarperCollins, 2019. ISBN 9780062698728
- "The Hurt Pattern, Made to Order: Robots and Revolution", Solaris, 2020. ISBN 9781781087879
- "Habibi", A Universe of Wishes: A We Need Diverse Books Anthology. Dhonielle Clayton, editor. Crown Books for Young Readers, 2020. ISBN 9781984896209
- "How to Pay Reparations: A Documentary", Year's Best Science Fiction Volume 2. Jonathan Strahan, editor. Saga Press, 2021. ISBN 9781534449626
- "How to Pay Reparations: A Documentary", The Best American Science Fiction and Fantasy 2021. Veronica Roth and John Joseph Adams, editors. Mariner Books, 2021. ISBN 9780358469964
- — (2022). A Righteous Man (ebook ed.). Amazon Original Stories.
- "Origin Story", Out There Screaming: An Anthology of New Black Horror (ed. Jordan Peele), Random House, 2023. ISBN 9780593243800

=== Short stories in magazines ===
- "Dust to Dust", Panverse Three, Panverse Publishing, September 2011 and Lightspeed Magazine, June 2019.
- "Zen and the Art of an Android Beatdown, or Cecile Meets a Boxer: A Love Story", Ideomancer, 2014.
- "Place of Worship", Asmiov's Science Fiction, September 2014.
- "Screamers", Omenana, i#8, November 2016.
- "The Fifth Day", Uncanny Magazine, i#30, September/October 2019.
- "A Room of One's Own", Us in Flux, Arizona State University Center for Science and the Imagination, May 2020.
- "How to Pay Reparations: A Documentary", Slate, August 2020.
- "Presque Vue", Uncanny Magazine, #41, 2021.

=== Nonfiction ===
- — (April 13, 2021). (S)kinfolk: Chimamanda Ngozi Adichie's Americanah. Fiction Advocate. ISBN 9780999431696.
- — (October 21, 2025). Racebook: A Personal History of the Internet. Roxane Gay Books. ISBN 9780802166258.

=== Essays ===
- "From Scalia and a White Supremacist, a Victory for Prisoners' Rights", The Common Law, November 2015.
- "Where Do Scalia's Come From?", Harvard Journal of African American Public Policy, 2016, p. 13–15.
- "From Harlem to Wakanda: on Luke Cage and Black Panther", Oxford University Press Blog, November 12, 2016.
- "Homecoming: How Afrofuturism Bridges the Past and the Present", Tor.com, February 27, 2018.
- "The Art of the Drug Deal: Kanye West, 'Daytona', and the Exploitation of Addiction", RaceBaitr, June 21, 2018.
- "Homo Duplex", Uncanny Magazine, #24, September/October 2018.
- "invisible: Not Seeing Myself in Any of my High School Reading Changed Me More than You'd Think", Slate, June 2019.
- "White Bears in Sugar Land: Juneteenth, Cages, and Afrofuturism", Tor.com, June 19, 2019.
- "Select Difficulty", Tor.com, August 26, 2019.
- "My Gift Was Memory: On Ta-Nehisi Coates's The Water Dancer", Tor.com, October 15, 2019.
- "30 Minutes Till Madness: Power and Male Derangement in The Wheel of Time", Tor.com, October 21, 2019.
- "'Where in your affidavit does it say you're Black?': Why Worldbuilding Can't Neglect Race", Tor.com, January 21, 2020.
- "Why War Stories Could Reinjure Those Affected", Oxford University Press Blog, April 8, 2020.
- "I Have No Mouth, and I Must Scream: The Duty of the Black Writer During Times of American Unrest", Tor.com, June 1, 2020.
- "Fine Weather, Isn't It?", Science Fiction and Fantasy Writers of America Bulletin #215, December 8, 2020.
