= Riot Baby =

2020 adult novella by Tochi Onyebuchi

- Author: Tochi Onyebuchi
- Language: English
- Genre: Science fiction
- Publisher: Tor Publishing
- Publication date: January 21, 2020
- Publication place: United States
- Media type: Print (hardcover)
- Pages: 176
- ISBN: 978-1-250-21475-1

Riot Baby is a science fiction novella written by Nigerian-American author Tochi Onyebuchi published in 2020.

== Plot ==
Ella Jackson is a young girl with clairvoyance and telekinetic powers, which she calls her "Thing". Her younger brother Kevin “Kev” is born during the 1992 Los Angeles Riots. Ella’s powers grow as she ages; she has seizure-like episodes that cause furniture to fly around and harm nearby onlookers. After almost accidentally killing her mother, Ella disappears.

Kev is convicted of attempted robbery and incarcerated at Rikers. Ella visits him regularly via astral projection. In a prison riot, Kev realizes that he may also be developing telekinetic powers. Kev’s mother dies while he is imprisoned. He considers suicide but changes his mind, eventually becoming a counselor for other suicidal inmates. After eight years of imprisonment, Kev is released on parole and decides to move back West.

Ella becomes increasingly angry with the violence and racial discrimination directed against Black Americans. She shows Kev a vision of his birth during the riots. In a series of increasingly abstract and violent images, Ella and Kev plan to use their powers to forge a better world for Black people.

== Awards ==
Year	Award	Category	Results	Ref
2020	Goodreads Choice Awards	Science Fiction	Finalist	
2020	Nebula Award	Best Novella	Finalist	
2021	Alex Award	—	Won	
2021	Hugo Award	Novella	Finalist	
2021	Ignyte Award	Novella	Won	
2021	Locus Award	Novella	Finalist	
2021	NAACP Image Award	Literature - Fiction	Finalist	
2021	Nommo Award	Novella	Finalist	
2021	World Fantasy Award	Novella	Won	
