= We Are the Crisis =

2023 fantasy novel by Cadwell Turnbull

- First edition cover art
- Author: Cadwell Turnbull
- Cover artist: Kathryn Galloway English
- Language: English
- Series: Convergence
- Release number: 2nd in series
- Genre: Urban fantasy
- Publisher: Blackstone Publishing
- Publication date: July 11, 2023
- Publication place: United States
- Pages: 338
- ISBN: 9781982603755
- Preceded by: No Gods, No Monsters
- Followed by: A Ruin, Great and Free

We Are the Crisis is an urban fantasy novel by American author Cadwell Turnbull. It was publishing by Blackstone Publishing on July 11, 2023. It is the sequel to No Gods, No Monsters, and the second book in the Convergence Saga. An audiobook narrated by Dion Graham was released concurrently with the hardback and ebook editions.

== Development ==
While working on the novel, Turnbull was full-time faculty at North Carolina State University and was working on an anthology and the beginning of a trilogy with his shared collective Many Worlds. He described the experience as "very overwhelming" and stated that it was the first time in which he failed to meet contracts and deadlines.

== Synopsis ==
A few years after the public finds out about the existence of monsters, monsters start disappearing. Werewolves Laina Calvary, her husband Riley Gibson, and her girlfriend Rebecca Vásquez suspect that the anti-monster hate group the Black Hand is connected to these disappearances. Dragon, a shapeshifting teenager, has escaped from the Cult of the Zsouvox but is being watched by both the Black Hand and a CIA agent, Alexandra Trapp. Weredog former U.S. Virgin Islands senator Sondra is hoping that her husband Matt, now a senator himself, can implement a bill that would establish legal protection for monsters. Meanwhile, Calvin continues to secretly observe parallel universes, while uncovering more about the role of "small gods" in the conflict between humans and monsters.

== Reception ==
The novel received positive reviews upon its release. It was featured as one of Kirkus Reviews' Best Science Fiction and Fantasy of 2023. It was nominated for an Ignyte Award for Outstanding Adult Novel.

Kirkus Reviews called the novel "rich, brilliant, and often sad". Kristi Chadwick of Library Journal praised the novel's "deft" prose. Publishers Weekly called its exploration of otherness, class, and race "as nuanced and robust as ever". Amal El-Mohtar called the novel "every bit as good" as its predecessor in her review for the New York Times, and praised its "realistic" dialogue in particular. In his review for Reactor, Tobias Carroll called the detached narration one of the novel's "most compelling" elements, while also praising its plotting, its "interesting" characters, and Turnbull's "vast" ambition. Gary K. Wolfe of Locus described the novel as "remarkable" and "relentfully provocative" with "impressive" set pieces, but noted that some readers may find its complexity "disorienting".
