= S. L. Huang =

Science fiction author

Shi Lian Huang
- Education: Massachusetts Institute of Technology (BS)
- Occupation: Writer
- Writing career
- Pen name: S. L. Huang
- Genres: Sci-fi; Speculative Fiction
- Notable works: Cas Russell series; “As the Last I May Know”; The Water Outlaws
- Notable awards: Hugo Award for Best Short Story, 2020
- Website: www.slhuang.com

Shi Lian Huang (published as S. L. Huang) is an American science fiction author.

Huang was born in New Jersey and completed a Bachelor of Mathematics at MIT. Huang later moved to Hollywood where they worked as a stunt performer and weapons expert on the television series Battlestar Galactica and Raising Hope, as well as reality shows Top Shot and Auction Hunters.

After being diagnosed with breast cancer, Huang left Hollywood to pursue writing. In 2020, Huang's short story "As the Last I May Know" won the Hugo Award for Best Short Story. Huang's novel Murder by Pixel was a finalist for the 2022 Hugo Award for Best Novelette. Their novel The Water Outlaws, a gender flipped retelling of the classic Chinese novel Water Margin, was a 2024 Nebula Award finalist.

Huang is known for the novel Zero Sum Game and its sequels. Cas Russel, the series' protagonist, is a super-intelligent mercenary with abilities drawn from Huang's own background in the mathematics. Huang released the fantasy novella Burning Roses in 2020. Huang began as a self-published author but was picked up by Tor Books.

Huang identifies as genderqueer.

== Awards ==
| Year | Nominee | Work | Category | Result | Ref. |
|---|---|---|---|---|---|
| 2017 | "The Little Homo Sapiens Scientist" | James Tiptree Jr. Award | — | Longlisted | |
| 2018 | "Time Travel Is Only for the Poor" | Analog Readers Poll | Short Story | Finalist–3rd | |
| 2020 | "As the Last I May Know" | Hugo Award | Short Story | Won | |
| 2022 | "Murder by Pixel" | Nebula Award | Novelette | Finalist | |
| 2023 | "Murder by Pixel" | Hugo Award | Novelette | Finalist | |
| 2023 | "Murder by Pixel" | Ignyte Award | Novelette | Finalist | |
| 2023 | The Water Outlaws | Nebula Award | Novel | Finalist | |
| 2024 | The Water Outlaws | Andrew Carnegie Medals for Excellence | Fiction | Longlisted | |
| 2024 | The Water Outlaws | BSFA Award | Novel | Longlisted | |
| 2024 | The Water Outlaws | Dragon Awards | Fantasy Novel | Nominated | |
| 2024 | The Water Outlaws | Locus Award | Fantasy Novel | Finalist–3rd | |

== Bibliography ==
A summary bibliography was adapted from the ISFDB.

=== Russell's Attic ===
- —— (2014). Zero Sum Game (paperback ed.). self-published. pp. 1–328. ISBN 978-0996070034.
- —— (2014). Half Life (ebook ed.). self-published. pp. 1–314. ISBN 978-0996070041.
- —— (2015). Root of Unity (ebook ed.). self-published. ISBN 978-0996070065.
- —— (2016). Plastic Smile (kindle ed.). self-published. pp. 1–294. ASIN B01GVPR39S.
- —— (2016). Golden Mean. unpublished.

=== Cas Russell Series ===
- —— (2018). Zero Sum Game (hardcover ed.). Tor Books. pp. 1–336. ISBN 978-1250180254.
- —— (2019). Null Set (hardcover ed.). Tor Books. pp. 1–320. ISBN 978-1250180308.
- —— (2020). Critical Point (hardcover ed.). Tor Books. pp. 1–368. ISBN 978-1250180360.
- Stories:
  - "A Neurological Study on the Effects of Canine Appeal on Psychopathy, or Rio Adopts a Puppy" (2015)
  - "An Examination of Collegial Dynamics as Expressed Through Marksmanship, or Ladies' Day Out" (2015)

=== The Water Outlaws ===
- The Water Outlaws (2023)
- The River Judge (2024, prequel novelette)

=== Novellas ===
- —— (2020). Burning Roses (hardcover ed.). Tor.com. pp. 1–160. ISBN 978-1250763990.
- —— (2026). The Language of Liars (hardcover ed.). Tor.com (published April 21, 2026). ISBN 978-1250405333.

=== Anthologies ===
- Up and Coming: Stories by the 2016 Campbell-Eligible Authors (2016) with Kurt Hunt

=== Short fiction ===
- "Hunting Monsters" (2014)
- "By Degrees and Dilatory Time" (2015)
- "My Grandmother's Bones" (2016)
- "The Documentarian" (2016)
- "The Little Homo Sapiens Scientist" (2016)
- "The Last Robot" (2017)
- "Split Shadow" (2017)
- "Time Travel Is Only for the Poor" (2017)
- "The Woman Who Destroyed Us" (2018)
- "Dulce et Decorum" (2018)
- "Devouring Tongues" (2018)
- "As the Last I May Know" (2019)
- "The Million-Mile Sniper" (2020)
- Murder by Pixel (2022)
