= Beasts Made of Night =

2017 fantasy novel by Tochi Onyebuchi

- Beasts Made of Night
- Author: Tochi Onyebuchi
- Language: English
- Series: Made of Night
- Genre: Fiction, Fantasy, Dark fantasy
- Published: 2017
- Publisher: Razorbill
- Publication place: Nigeria
- Pages: 304
- Award: 2018 Ilube Nommo Award for Best Speculative Fiction Novel
- ISBN: 978-0-448-49390-9
- Followed by: Crown of Thunder

Beast Made of Night is a 2017 young adult fantasy novel by Nigerian-American novelist Tochi Onyebuchi. It is the first book in a duology set in a magical world inspired by Nigeria.

== Reception ==
Beast Made of Night received positive reviews for its world building and themes. A review from NPR lauded the novel as the beginning of a great saga. In a starred review, Kirkus praised it as a story that "moves beyond the boom-bang, boring theology of so many fantasies—and, in the process, creates, almost griotlike, a paean to an emerging black legend". Time recognized the book as one of the 100 Best Fantasy Books of All Time, praising Onyebuchi's creativity and world building.

== Award ==
- 2018 Nommo Award for Best Speculative Fiction Novel, won

== Sequel ==
A sequel, Crown of Thunder, was released by Razorbill in 2018.
