= No Gods, No Monsters =

2021 novel by Cadwell Turnbull

- Author: Cadwell Turnbull
- Language: English
- Series: Convergence Saga
- Release number: 1
- Genre: Fantasy; science fiction
- Publisher: Blackstone Publishing
- Publication date: September 7, 2021
- Publication place: United States
- ISBN: 978-1-982603-72-4
- Followed by: We Are the Crisis

No Gods, No Monsters is a 2021 science fiction/fantasy novel written by American author Cadwell Turnbull. It tells the story of monsters making their existence known to find protection in visibility. The story is told from multiple perspectives giving readers a variety of viewpoints. The novel tackles issues of societal and political unrest, and explores themes of identity, power, and community. The book was first published by Blackstone Publishing on September 7, 2021.

== Plot summary ==
The novel opens with an unnamed first-person narrator who recalls the death of his brother Corey. The narrator begins recounting a series of interconnected stories.

In October 2022, Laina Calvary learns that her brother Lincoln has been shot and killed by police. Laina and Lincoln have been estranged for years due to his struggles with addiction and mental illness. Laina attends his funeral, where she attacks their cousin Simone, who had sexually abused Lincoln as a child. A disembodied voice later offers to obtain bodycam footage of Lincoln’s death. Soon after, a woman named Rebecca, who claims to have been Lincoln’s friend, visits Laina and leaves her a thumb drive containing the missing video. The footage reveals that Lincoln was a werewolf who reverted to human form after being killed. Laina releases the video online, and it quickly goes viral.

In the aftermath, a group of werewolves publicly transforms, announcing the existence of monsters to the broader world. Rebecca is revealed to be a werewolf at this time. This event, later called “the Fracture,” destabilizes society. A mysterious entity soon deletes all known copies of the video, deepening public division. Some dismiss the phenomenon as a hoax, while others believe in monsters. Hate crimes and political unrest rise sharply.

Four months after the Fracture, a man named Harry Shiner follows clues on Internet forums. He is eventually invited to a meeting of the secret society known as the Order of the Zsouvox. There, Harry and other recruits are maimed in a violent ritual. They are burned and their hands are devoured by Dragon, a shapeshifting child held captive by Zsouvox leader Mr. Smoke. Dragon is eventually rescued by the three people named Melku, Sondra, and Sonya. They ask him to help them liberate other children in similar captivity. Meanwhile, Melku has a cryptic exchange with the invisible narrator, who flees.

Eight months after the Fracture, the unnamed narrator returns home to Saint Thomas, where he reconnects with his sister-in-law Karen and his niece Gina, who dreams of her deceased father Corey. He recounts the story of Corey’s death. Elsewhere, Rebecca is living in Massachusetts in a polyamorous relationship with Laina and Laina's husband Ridley. Rebecca's werewolf roommate Sarah becomes part of their circle. Ridley continues his work with a cooperative, where Melku pushes the group to support civil rights for monsters. Melku is revealed to be a monster as well. The cooperative's meeting is violently disrupted by an attack from a “lesser god,” leaving one member dead.

Nine months after the Fracture, in Saint Thomas, Senator Sondra meets with her sister Sonya. Their mother, long presumed dead, has recently been located in Massachusetts. Sonya belongs to the Order of Asha, a secret group advocating for monster rights and opposed to the Order of the Zsouvox. Sonya and Sondra find their mother, but discover that she has been cursed and has lost her memories.

The unnamed narrator finally identifies himself as Calvin. Calvin witnessed Corey’s descent into violence and drug use before Corey was killed by Karen’s new boyfriend. Over the years, Calvin developed the ability to perceive alternate versions of events, realizing he can glimpse parallel universes. He discusses this with Hugh, a physics professor, whose own life Calvin observes unfolding in multiple variations.

One year after the Fracture, Laina organizes a birthday party for Ridley. There, Sarah confronts him about his hesitance to fully support monster rights. Afterward, Laina persuades him to attend a protest. Despite his trauma from witnessing the lesser god's attack in the previous months, Ridley is convinced to attend.

At the demonstration, Sonya attempts to identify other monsters when gunmen open fire. Multiple shooters aim at Dragon, who is separated from Sonya in the chaos. Ridley and Rebecca are shot. Sarah transforms into a werewolf, killing one of the shooters. Police then fire on Sarah, fatally wounding her; enraged, she attacks officers before being killed. The attackers are revealed to be controlled by the Order of Zsouvox. Among them is Harry Shiner, who had previously been burned by Dragon. Harry and Karuna, another victim of the Zsouvox, escape with Dragon. Melku and Sonya reflect on the growing conflict between the two secret orders. Sondra is angry that her sister exposed her to danger, and refuses to participate further. Calvin then approaches Melku, introducing himself at last.

== Reception ==
Kirkus Reviews gave the novel a starred review, praising the flawed narration of Calvin and the sympathetic portrayals of characters such as Sondra and Sonya. The review called it "a deeply human story, beautifully and compellingly told."

== Awards and honors ==
- Named Best Book of 2021 by the New York Times, NPR, the New York Public Library, Audible, Tor.com, Book Riot, Library Journal, and Kirkus.

Year	Award	Category	Result	Ref.
2022	Shirley Jackson Award	Novel	Finalist	
2022	Locus Award	Fantasy Novel	Finalist	
2022	Lambda Literary Award	Speculative Fiction	Won	
