= Gautam Bhatia (lawyer) =

Indian scholar of constitutional law (born 1988)

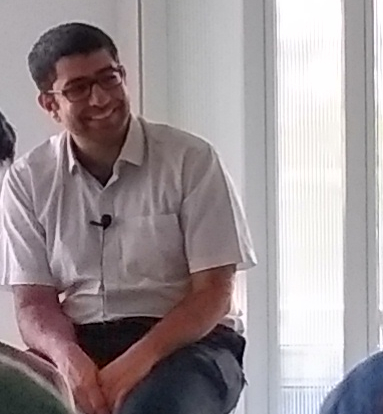
- Gautam Bhatia at a Bangalore event in January 2020
- Born: 1988 (age 37–38); New Delhi
- Education: National Law School of India University, Balliol College, University of Oxford, Yale University
- Occupations: scholar, lawyer, author
- Awards: Rhodes Scholarship

Gautam Bhatia is a constitutional law scholar and science fiction author from India. He is also a professor of law at the Jindal Global Law School.

== Early life and education ==
Bhatia was born to a mathematician father and a documentary-film-maker mother; he was raised in New Delhi.

He attained his BA. LL.B. from National Law School of India University in 2011, and went on to pursue a B.C.L. (2012) and M.Phil. (2013) from Balliol College, University of Oxford as a Rhodes Scholar. Subsequently, he received a LL.M. from Yale University (2014) specializing in constitutional law. As of 2019, Bhatia was a doctoral scholar at University of Oxford; he successfully defended his thesis in November 2021.

== Work ==
=== Law ===
==== Offend, Shock, Or Disturb: Free Speech Under the Indian Constitution ====
In 2016, Offend, Shock, Or Disturb: Free Speech Under the Indian Constitution was published by Oxford University Press India. The book provides a philosophical and legal analysis of Indian free speech jurisprudence, probing into issues of liberty, autonomy, equality, and anti-subordination. Bhatia largely agrees with the decision of the Supreme Court of India in S. Rangarajan v. Jagjivan Ram and goes on to propose a realm of 'constitutional morality' to evaluate restrictions on free speech, wherein the identity of the speaker, target, historical and cultural associations, and social situation should be taken into account to decide upon each case.

Arudra Burra, a professor of philosophy at IIT Delhi, reviewing for Scroll.in, noted it to be an interesting and illuminating "must-read" despite some issues. Jinee Lokaneeta, a professor of political science at Drew University, noted the work to be powerful, chilling and insightful in that it "raised important questions about colonial continuities, postcolonial choices, and the quotidian life of the law in relation to societal hierarchies"; however, it lacked in the subaltern. Mark Tushnet found the monograph to have provided a clear and comprehensive account of Indian free-speech-laws, but expressed reservations against Bhatia's universalist and normative approach.

A review in Economic and Political Weekly admired the work as a compelling marshaling of facts in favor of a liberal defense of free-speech-rights, while criticising Bhatia's attribution of judgements to legal theories and underemphasis on the practicalities of an over-burdened legal system and other factors. Avantika Mehra, reviewing for The Hindustan Times, found the book to be a specialist work which was invaluable for research-purposes; however, she criticized Bhatia for locating his theorizing in a realpolitik vacuum and ignoring cases which challenged his analyses. A review in The Hindu noted the work to be a lucid and detailed examination of the law of free speech in India and its evolution.

==== The Transformative Constitution: A Radical Biography in Nine Acts ====
In February 2019, The Transformative Constitution: A Radical Biography in Nine Acts was published by HarperCollins India . The book drew praise from critics, and was shortlisted for The Hindu Literary Prize in 2019 for the non-fiction category.

Sandeep Suresh, a professor of law at Jindal Global Law School, reviewing for International Journal of Constitutional Law, commended Bhatia for adding an erudite and painstakingly researched monograph to the existing literature on Indian constitutional law. In The Hindu, Mukul Kesavan, considered the book to a formidable achievement for its lucid writing, systematic argumentation and marshaling of history, political ideas and jurisprudence. Nikhil Govind, a professor of philosophy at Manipal University (MAHE), noted in Scroll.in that it was a timely work that would aid in increasing legal literacy and lead to a more participative citizenship. Shefali Jha, a professor of political science at Jawaharlal Nehru University, found the work to be a valuable contribution to the field of constitutional studies, one which advocated for contestatory democracy in place of electoral democracy. Rajeev Dhavan, reviewing for The Indian Express, was admiring of Bhatia as an excellent jurist but aired pessimism about the practicalities.

==== Others ====
Bhatia has contributed chapters on "Directive Principles" to The Oxford Handbook of the Indian Constitution and "Religious Speech" to The Oxford Handbook of Freedom of Speech. In 2021, in the wake of protests against Citizenship (Amendment) Act, Gautam Bhatia, Romila Thapar, Gautam Patel, and N. Ram coauthored a book on the multiple dimensionalities of citizenship in India.

=== Science fiction ===
==== The Wall ====
In August 2020, The Wall —a speculative fiction novel — was published by HarperCollins to critical acclaim. Set in a dystopian city called Sumer, which is guarded by impenetrable walls and has a strict hierarchical society, the novel follows the chronicles of Mithila, a queer girl (and her cohort) who seeks to venture beyond those boundaries.

Avantika Mehra, reviewing for Scroll.in, noted the work to be a fine debut that mirrors neoliberal realities and touches on the themes of equality and freedom, but criticized Bhatia's over-reliance on dialogues and sketchy character-building at the cost of superb world-building. However, Omair Ahmad, said in his review for The Wire, that he admired the "deeply imagined, stylish and confident debut" for its bare-bones character-development, sympathetic portrayal of the perspectives of the many groups who inhabited Sumer, and unique world-building . A review in The Hindustan Times considered the novel to be an "allegorical examination of the present state of [Indian] democracy" and an important addition to the world of speculative fiction. Shrabontee Bagchi, for Mint Lounge, noted The Wall to be richly layered and highly satisfying. A review in Open admired Bhatia for sketching a layered narrative and raising crucial political questions in a hard-to-put-down book.

==== The Horizon ====
A sequel to The Wall, titled The Horizon was published by HarperCollins in October 2021.

=== The Sentence/The Fifth Inflection ===
A separate novel, The Sentence was published by Westland Books in 2024. It won the 2025 Ignyte Award for Best Adult Novel. In October 2025 Saga Press announced that a worldwide edition would be published in 2027 under the name The Fifth Inflection.

=== Columns ===
Bhatia is a regular columnist for multiple Indian news-media outlets. His writes and edits analysis of constitutional law and the Supreme Court of India on the Indian Constitutional Law and Philosophy Blog. He is also the co-ordinating editor of Strange Horizons, a weekly magazine of and about speculative fiction.

His article The Secret History of Indian Science Fiction, published in Alter Magazine in 2025, won the 2026 Ignyte Award for Outstanding Creative Non-Fiction.
