= Locus Award for Best Non-fiction =

Literary award for nonfiction book

The Locus Award for Non-fiction is one of the annual Locus Awards presented by the science fiction and fantasy magazine Locus. Awards presented in a given year are for works published in the previous calendar year.

The Best non-fiction award has been made since 1979, originally known as Best Reference Book. The category was briefly merged with Best Art Book in 2004 and 2009-2010, and had on some occasions been previous won by graphic novels, which at the time did not have a category to fit them.

== Winners ==
Award winners
Year	Nominated work	Author	Ref.
1979	The Way the Future Was	Frederik Pohl	
1980	The Science Fiction Encyclopedia	Peter Nicholls	
1981	In Joy Still Felt: The Autobiography of Isaac Asimov, 1954-1978	Isaac Asimov	
1982	Danse Macabre	Stephen King	
1983	The Engines of the Night	Barry N. Malzberg	
1984	Dream Makers, Volume II	Charles Platt	
1985	Sleepless Nights in the Procrustean Bed	Harlan Ellison	
1986	Benchmarks: Galaxy Bookshelf	Algis Budrys	
1987	Trillion Year Spree	Brian Aldiss with David Wingrove	
1988	Watchmen	Alan Moore and Dave Gibbons	
1989	First Maitz	Don Maitz	
1990	Grumbles from the Grave	Robert A. Heinlein	
1991	Science Fiction Writers of America Handbook	Kristine Kathryn Rusch and Dean Wesley Smith	
1992	Science-Fiction: The Early Years	Everett F. Bleiler	
1993	Dinotopia	James Gurney	
1994	The Encyclopedia of Science Fiction	John Clute and Peter Nicholls	
1995	I. Asimov: A Memoir	Harlan Ellison	
1996	Science Fiction: The Illustrated Encyclopedia	John Clute	
1997	Look at the Evidence	John Clute	
1998	The Encyclopedia of Fantasy	John Clute and John Grant	
1999	The Dreams Our Stuff Is Made Of: How Science Fiction Conquered the World	Thomas M. Disch	
2000	Sixty Years of Arkham House	S. T. Joshi	
2001	On Writing	Stephen King	
2002	Being Gardner Dozois	Michael Swanwick	
2003	Tomorrow Now: Envisioning the Next Fifty Years	Bruce Sterling	
2004	The Sandman: Endless Nights	Neil Gaiman	
2005	The Wave in the Mind	Ursula K. Le Guin	
2006	Storyteller: Writing Lessons and More from 27 Years of the Clarion Writers' Workshop	Kate Wilhelm	
2007	James Tiptree, Jr.: The Double Life of Alice B. Sheldon	Julie Phillips	
2008	Breakfast in the Ruins	Barry N. Malzberg	
2009	Awarded to an Art Book		
2010	Cheek by Jowl: Essays	Ursula K. Le Guin	
2011	Robert A. Heinlein: In Dialogue with His Century: Volume 1: 1907-1948: Learning Curve	William H. Patterson, Jr	
2012	Evaporating Genres: Essays on Fantastic Literature	Gary K. Wolfe	
2013	Distrust That Particular Flavor	William Gibson	
2014	Wonderbook: The Illustrated Guide to Creating Imaginative Fiction	Jeff VanderMeer	
2015	What Makes This Book So Great	Jo Walton	
2016	Letters to Tiptree	Alisa Krasnostein and Alexandra Pierce	
2017	The Geek Feminist Revolution	Kameron Hurley	
2018	Luminescent Threads: Connections to Octavia E. Butler	Alexandra Pierce and Mimi Mondal	
2019	Ursula K. Le Guin: Conversations on Writing	Ursula K. Le Guin and David Naimon	
2020	Monster, She Wrote: The Women Who Pioneered Horror and Speculative Fiction	Lisa Kröger and Melanie R. Anderson	
2021	The Magic of Terry Pratchett	Marc Burrows	
2022	Dangerous Visions and New Worlds: Radical Science Fiction, 1950 to 1985	Andrew Nette and Iain McIntyre	
2023	Terry Pratchett: A Life With Footnotes: The Official Biography	Rob Wilkins	
2024	Space Crone	Ursula K. Le Guin	
2025	Afro-Centered Futurisms in Our Speculative Fiction	Eugen Bacon	
2026	Enshittification	Cory Doctorow	
