= Shirley Jackson Award for Best Single-Author Collection =

Literary award for works of dark fantasy and psychological suspense

- Awarded for: The best psychological suspense, horror, or dark fantastic collection of at least 40,000 words, published in English in the same calendar year
- Location: Massachusetts
- Country: United States
- Presented by: Readercon
- First award: 2007
- Most recent winner: Nadia Bulkin (Issues with Authority)
- Website: shirleyjacksonawards.org

The Shirley Jackson Award for Best Single-Author Collection is a literary award given annually at Readercon as part of their Shirley Jackson Awards.

== Terminology ==
In 2007, the inaugural award was given as the Shirley Jackson Award for Best Collection. Beginning in 2010, the award has been entitled the Shirley Jackson Award for Best Single-Author Collection.

== Criteria ==
To be eligible for the award, a collection must total at least 40,000 words. The collection may contain a combination of fiction, nonfiction, and collaborative works. At least 50% of the collection must be fiction.

== Winners and Finalists ==
* Winners

Year	Author	Novel	Publisher	Ref.
2007	Laird Barron*	The Imago Sequence and Other Stories	Night Shade Books	
2007	Sarah Monette	The Bone Key	Prime Books	
2007	Lucy Corin	The Entire Predicament	Tin House	
2007	Jim Shepard	Like You’d Understand, Anyway	Knopf	
2007	Christopher Fowler	Old Devil Moon	Serpent's Tail	
2008	Yōko Ogawa*	The Diving Pool	Picador	
2008	Chris Adrian	A Better Angel	Farrar, Straus and Giroux	
2008	Steven Millhauser	Dangerous Laughter: 13 Stories	Knopf	
2008	Etgar Keret	The Girl on the Fridge	Farrar, Straus and Giroux	
2008	Stephen King	Just After Sunset	Scribner	
2008	Joyce Carol Oates	Wild Nights!	Ecco Press	
2009	Robert Shearman*	Love Songs for the Shy and Cynical	Big Finish Productions	
2009	Kevin Wilson*	Tunneling to the Center of the Earth	Harper Perennial	
2009	Brian Evenson	Fugue State	Coffee House Press	
2009	Otsuichi	Zoo	Haikasoru	
2009	Lyudmila Petrushevskaya	There Once Lived a Woman Who Tried to Kill Her Neighbor's Baby: Scary Fairy Tales	Penguin Books	
2009	Paul Witcover	Everland and Other Stories	PS Publishing	
2010	Laird Barron*	Occultation	Night Shade Books	
2010	Stephen Graham Jones	The Ones That Got Away	Prime Books	
2010	Jeff VanderMeer	The Third Bear	Tachyon Publications	
2010	Karen Joy Fowler	What I Didn't See and Other Stories	Small Beer Press	
2010	Scott Edelman	What Will Come After	PS Publishing	
2011	Maureen F. McHugh*	After the Apocalypse: Stories	Small Beer Press	
2011	Christopher Fowler	Red Gloves	PS Publishing	
2011	Glen Hirshberg	The Janus Tree	Subterranean Press	
2011	Livia Llewellyn	Engines of Desire: Tales of Love & Other Horrors	Lethe Press	
2011	Joyce Carol Oates	The Corn Maiden and Other Nightmares	Mysterious Press	
2011	Kit Reed	What Wolves Know	PS Publishing	
2012	Jeffrey Ford*	Crackpot Palace	Morrow	
2012	Jonathan Carroll	The Woman Who Married a Cloud	Subterranean Press	
2012	Andy Duncan	The Pottawatomie Giant and Other Stories	PS Publishing	
2012	Brian Evenson	Windeye	Coffee House Press	
2012	Elizabeth Hand	Errantry	Small Beer Press	
2012	Robert Shearman	Remember Why You Fear Me	ChiZine	
2013	Nathan Ballingrud*	North American Lake Monsters	Small Beer Press	
2013	Christopher Barzak*	Before and Afterlives	Lethe Press	
2013	Michael Marshall Smith	Everything You Need	Earthling Publications	
2013	Will Ludwigsen	In Search Of and Others	Lethe Press	
2013	Kit Reed	The Story Until Now	Wesleyan	
2014	Helen Marshall*	Gifts for the One who Comes After	ChiZine	
2014	Mike Allen	Unseaming	Antimatter	
2014	Stephen Graham Jones	After the People Lights Have Gone Off	Dark House	
2014	Robert Shearman	They Do The Same Things Different There	ChiZine	
2014	Simon Strantzas	Burnt Black Suns	Hippocampus Press	
2015	Stephen King*	The Bazaar of Bad Dreams	Scribner	
2015	Dale Bailey	The End of the End of Everything: Stories	Arche	
2015	T. E. Grau	The Nameless Dark: A Collection	Lethe Press	
2015	Amelia Gray	Gutshot	FSG Originals	
2015	Kelly Link	Get in Trouble	Random House	
2015	Mary Rickert	You Have Never Been Here	Small Beer Press	
2016	Jeffrey Ford*	A Natural History of Hell	Small Beer Press	
2016	Clare Beams	We Show What We Have Learned	Lookout	
2016	Livia Llewellyn	Furnace	Word Horde	
2016	D. P. Watt	Almost Insentient, Almost Divine	Undertow	
2016	Michael Wehunt	Greener Pastures	Shock Totem	
2017	Carmen Maria Machado*	Her Body and Other Parties	Graywolf Press	
2017	Nadia Bulkin	She Said Destroy	Word Horde	
2017	Camilla Grudova	The Doll's Alphabet	Coffee House Press	
2017	Samantha Hunt	The Dark Dark	FSG Originals	
2017	Chavisa Woods	Things to Do When You're Goth in the Country	Seven Stories	
2018	Priya Sharma*	All the Fabulous Beasts	Undertow	
2018	Gemma Files	Drawn Up from Deep Places	Trepidatio	
2018	Michael Griffin	The Human Alchemy	Word Horde	
2018	Sean O'Brien	Quartier Perdu	Comma Press	
2018	Lucy A. Snyder	Garden of Eldritch Delights	Raw Dog Screaming	
2019	Brian Evenson*	Song for the Unraveling of the World	Coffee House Press	
2019	J. S. Breukelaar	Collision: Stories	Meerkat	
2019	Joanna Pearson	Every Human Love: Stories	Acre Books	
2019	Nino Cipri	Homesick	Dzanc Books	
2019	Samanta Schweblin	Mouthful of Birds	Riverhead Books	
2019	Nathan Ballingrud	Wounds	Saga Press	
2020	Kathe Koja*	Velocities	Meerkat	
2020	Mike Allen	Aftermath of an Industrial Accident	Mythic Delirium	
2020	Kay Chronister	Thin Places	Undertow	
2020	Jen Fawkes	Mannequin and Wife	LSU Press	
2020	M. John Harrison	Settling the World	Comma Press	
2020	JD Scott	Moonflower, Nightshade, All the Hours of the Day	Lake Forest College Press	
2021	Keith Rosson*	Folk Songs for Trauma Surgeons	Meerkat	
2021	Hiromi Kawakami (author); Ted Goossen (translator)	People From My Neighborhood	Soft Skull	
2021	Kurt Kawver	We are Happy, We are Doomed	Grimscribe	
2021	John Linwood Grant	Where All is Night, and Starless	Trepidatio	
2021	J. A. W. McCarthy	Sometimes We're Cruel	Cemetery Gates	
2022	Paula D. Ashe*	We Are Here to Hurt Each Other	Nictitating	
2022	Kim Fu	Lesser Known Monsters of the 21st Century	Tin House	
2022	RJ Joseph	Hell Hath No Sorrow Like a Woman Haunted	The Seventh Terrace	
2022	Cassandra Khaw	Breakable Things	Undertow	
2022	Nicolay	And At My Back I Always Hear	Word Horde	
2022	Allison Wyss	Splendid Anatomies	Veliz	
2023	Gabriela Damián Miravete (author)*; Adrian Demopulos (translator)*	They Will Dream in the Garden	Rosarium	
2023	Paola Ferrante	Her Body Among Animals	Book*hug	
2023	Yvette Lisa Ndlovu	Drinking from Graveyard Wells	University Press of Kentucky	
2023	Tobi Ogundiran	Jackal, Jackal	Undertow	
2023	Rebecca Rowland	White Trash & Recycled Nightmares	Dead Sky	
2024	Scott Thomas*	Midwestern Gothic	Inkshares	
2024	Eugen Bacon	A Place Between Waking and Forgetting	Raw Dog Screaming	
2024	Carina Bissett	Dead Girl, Driving and Other Devastations	Trepidatio	
2024	Devon A. Mihesuah	The Bone Picker: Native Stories, Alternate Histories	University of Oklahoma Press	
2024	David Surface	These Things That Walk Behind Me	Lethe Press	
2025	Nadia Bulkin*	Issues with Authority	Ghoulish Books	
2025	Samanta Schweblin	Good and Evil and Other Stories	Alfred A. Knopf	
2025	Megan McDowell (translator)	Good and Evil and Other Stories	Alfred A. Knopf	
2025	Carol Emshwiller	Moon Songs: The Selected Stories of Carol Emshwiller	Third Man Books	
2025	Debbie Urbanski	Portalmania: Stories	Simon & Schuster	
2025	Mo Moshaty	Clairviolence: Tales of Tarot and Torment	Tenebrous Press	
