= Shirley Jackson Award for Best Novelette =

Literary award for works of dark fantasy and psychological suspense

Shirley Jackson Award for Best Novellette
- Awarded for: The best psychological suspense, horror, or dark fantastic novella of 7,500-17,499 words, published in English in the same calendar year
- Location: Massachusetts
- Country: United States
- Presented by: Readercon
- First award: 2007
- Most recent winner: Vanessa Santos (Emily)
- Website: shirleyjacksonawards.org

The Shirley Jackson Award for Best Novelette is a literary award given annually at Readercon as part of their Shirley Jackson Awards.

== Winners and Finalists ==
* Winners

Year	Author	Novel	Originally Published In:	Ref.
2007	Glen Hirshberg*	"The Janus Tree"	Inferno, Tor Books	
2007	Laird Barron	"The Forest"	Inferno, Tor Books	
2007	Don Tumasonis	"The Swing"	At Ease with the Dead, Ash-Tree Press	
2007	William Browning Spencer	"The Tenth Muse"	Subterranean #6, 2007	
2007	Joe Hill	"Thumbprint"	Postscripts #10, March 2007	
2008	John Kessel*	"Pride and Prometheus"	F&SF	
2008	Deborah Noyes	"Hunger Moon"	The Ghosts of Kerfol	
2008	Laird Barron	"The Lagerstatte"	The Del Rey Book of Science Fiction and Fantasy	
2008	William Browning Spencer	"Penguins of the Apocalypse"	Subterranean: Tales of Dark Fantasy	
2008	Jeff VanderMeer	The Situation	PS Publishing	
2009	Stephen King*	"Morality"	Esquire	
2009	Laird Barron	"Catch Hell"	Lovecraft Unbound	
2009	Andy Duncan	The Night Cache	PS Publishing	
2009	Gemma Files; Stephen J. Barringer	"each thing i show you is a piece of my death"	Clockwork Phoenix 2	
2009	Stephen Graham Jones	"Lonegan's Luck"	New Genre 6	
2010	Neil Gaiman*	"The Truth Is a Cave in the Black Mountains"	Stories	
2010	Laird Barron	"-30-"	Occultation	
2010	Laird Barron	"The Broadsword"	Black Wings	
2010	Richard Butner	"Holderhaven"	Crimewave 11: Ghosts	
2010	Laird Barron	"The Redfield Girls"	Haunted Legends	
2011	Kelly Link*	"The Summer People"	Tin House 49 / Steampunk!	
2011	Livia Llewellyn	"Omphalos"	Engines of Desire: Tales of Love & Other Horrors	
2011	Lucius Shepard	"Ditch Witch"	Supernatural Noir	
2011	Peter Straub	"The Ballad of Ballard and Sandrine"	Conjunctions #56	
2012	Karen Russell*	Reeling for the Empire	Tin House, Winter 2012	
2012	Nathan Ballingrud	"Wild Acre"	Visions, Fading Fast	
2012	Jeffrey Ford	"The Wish Head"	Crackpot Palace	
2012	Bruce McAllister	"The Crying Child" (Note: Originally entitled "The Bleeding Child")	Cemetery Dance #68	
2012	Ian Rogers	"The House on Ashley Avenue"	Every House is Haunted	
2013	Greer Gilman*	Cry Murder! In a Small Voice	Small Beer Press	
2013	Tanith Lee	"A Little of the Night"	Clockwork Phoenix 4	
2013	Megan Abbott	"My Heart is Either Broken"	Dangerous Women	
2013	Veronica Schanoes	"Phosphorus"	Queen Victoria’s Book of Spells: An Anthology of Gaslamp Fantasy	
2013	Conrad Williams	"Raptors"	Subterranean, Winter 2013	
2014	Dale Bailey*	"The End of the End of Everything"	Tor.com, April 2014	
2014	Kate Bernheimer; Laird Hunt	Office at Night	Coffee House Press	
2014	V.H. Leslie	"The Quiet Room"	Shadows & Tall Trees, 2014	
2014	Carmen Maria Machado	"The Husband Stitch"	Granta #129	
2014	Stephen Volk	"Newspaper Heart"	The Spectral Book of Horror Stories	
2014	Kai Ashante Wilson	"The Devil in America"	Tor.com, April 2014	
2015	Steve Duffy*	"Even Clean Hands Can Do Damage"	Supernatural Tales #30	
2015	Jeffrey Ford	"The Thyme Fiend"	Tor.com, March 2015	
2015	Deborah Kalin	"The Briskwater Mare"	Cherry Crow Children	
2015	Tamsyn Muir	"The Deepwater Bride"	F&SF, June-July 2015	
2015	Priya Sharma	"Fabulous Beasts"	Tor.com, July 2015	
2016	Camilla Grudova*	"Waxy"	Granta, September 2016	
2016	Laird Barron	"Andy Kaufman Creeping Through the Trees"	Autumn Cthulhu	
2016	Indrapramit Das	"Breaking Water"	Tor.com, February 2016	
2016	Stephen Graham Jones	"The Night Cyclist"	Tor.com, September 2016	
2016	Sam J. Miller	"Angel, Monster, Man"	Nightmare Magazine, January 2016	
2016	Helen Oyeyemi	"Presence"	What Is Not Yours Is Not Yours	
2017	Chavisa Woods*	"Take the Way Home That Leads Back to Sullivan Street"	Things to Do When You're Goth in the Country	
2017	Kathleen Kayembe	"You Will Always Have Family: A Triptych"	Nightmare Magazine, March 2017	
2017	Carmen Maria Machado	"The Resident"	Her Body and Other Parties	
2017	Laura Mauro	"Sun Dogs"	Shadows & Tall Trees, Volume 7	
2017	Jeremiah Tolbert	"The West Topeka Triangle"	Lightspeed, January 2017	
2018	Tom Cox*	Help the Witch	Unbound	
2018	Maria Dahvana Headley	"Adriftica"	Robots vs Fairies	
2018	Chris Mason	"The Black Sea"	Beneath the Waves: Tales from the Deep	
2018	Maria Romasco Moore	Ghostographs: An Album	Rose Metal	
2018	D.P. Watt	"Blood and Smoke, Vinegar and Ashes"	The Silent Garden	
2019	Brooke Warra*	Luminous Body	Dim Shores	
2019	Simon Strantzas	Black Bequeathments	Dim Shores	
2019	Joanna Koch	The Couvade	Demain Publishing	
2019	Steve Dillon	"Deeper, Darker Things"	Deeper, Darker Things and Other Oddities	
2019	Kurt Fawver	Pwdre Ser	Dim Shores	
2019	M.R. Carey	"Taproot"	Ten-Word Tragedies	
2020	J. Ashley-Smith*	The Attic Tragedy	Meerkat	
2020	Gayle Brandeis	Many Restless Concerns: The Victims of Countess Bathory Speak in Chorus (A Testimony)	Black Lawrence Press	
2020	Matthew R. Davis	"Heritage Hill"	Outback Horrors Down Under	
2020	Bernardo Esquinca (author); James D. Jenkins (translator)	"Señor Ligotti"	The Valancourt Book of World Horror Stories	
2020	Marko Hautala (author); Sanna Terho (translator)	"Pale Toes"	The Valancourt Book of World Horror Stories	
2020	Jessica Landry	"I Will Find You, Even in the Dark"	Dim Shores Presents, Volume 1	
2020	Sayaka Murata (author); Ginny Tapley Takemori (translator)	"Faith"	Granta, November 2020	
2021	E. A. Petricone*	"We, the Girls Who Did Not Make It"	Nightmare Magazine, February 2021	
2021	Margaret Jameson	"The Women"	F(r)iction, Spring 2021	
2021	Jess Landry	"The Night Belongs to Us"	The Mother Wound	
2021	Lisa Unger	House of Crows	Amazon Original	
2021	A.C. Wise	"The Nag Bride"	The Ghost Sequences	
2022	Nghi Vo*	What the Dead Know	Amazon Original	
2022	Thomas Ha	"Sweetbaby"	Clarkesworld Magazine, October 2022	
2022	Usman T. Malik	"Challawa"	Dark Stars: New Tales of Darkest Horror	
2022	Lisa Moore	Azeman or, the Testament of Quincey Morris	Black Shuck	
2022	David Erik Nelson	"This Place is Best Shunned"	Tor.com, July 2022	
2023	Eugenia Triantafyllou*	"Six Versions of My Brother Found Under the Bridge"	Uncanny Magazine, Sep-Oct 2023	
2023	Joe Hill	"The Pram"	Amazon Original	
2023	Minka Kent	People Like Them	Amazon Original	
2023	Silvia Moreno-Garcia	The Lover	Amazon Original	
2023	Lynn C. Pitts	"The Swan"	Infinite Constellations	
2023	Cat Powell	"What’s He Building in There"	Fairy Tale Review: The Rainbow Issue, Vol. 19, 2023	
2023	Michael Wehunt	"Vampire Fiction"	The Inconsolables	
2024	Kurt Fawver*	The Thirteen Ways We Turned Darryl Datson into a Monster	Dim Shores	
2024	Lyndsey Croal	"The Girl with Barnacles for Eyes"	Split Scream, Volume 5	
2024	Eric LaRocca	"All the Parts of You That Won’t Easily Burn"	This Skin Was Once Mine and Other Disturbances	
2024	David Sandner	His Unburned Heart	Raw Dog Screaming	
2024	M. Shaw	"Ready Player (n+1)"	All Your Friends Are Here	
2024	Clay McLeod Chapman	Stay on the Line	Shortwave	
2025	Vanessa Santos*	"Emily"	Make a Home of Me	
2025	Stephen Volk	The Confirmed Bachelors	Black Shuck Books	
2025	Owen King	Letter Slot	Amazon Original Stories	
2025	Sarah Pinsker	"The Millay Illusion"	Uncanny Magazine, November-December 2025	
2025	Mo Moshaty	"The Severity of Things"	Clairviolence: Tales of Tarot and Torment	
