= Shirley Jackson Award for Best Short Fiction =

Literary award for works of dark fantasy and psychological suspense

- Awarded for: The best psychological suspense, horror, or dark fantastic novel of at under 7,500 words, published in English in the same calendar year
- Location: Massachusetts
- Country: United States
- Presented by: Readercon
- First award: 2007
- Most recent winner: Kaaron Warren (Bitter Skin)
- Website: shirleyjacksonawards.org

The Shirley Jackson Award for Best Short Fiction is a literary award given annually at Readercon as part of their Shirley Jackson Awards.

== Terminology ==
In 2007, the inaugural award was given as the Shirley Jackson Award for Best Short Story. Since 2012, the award has been entitled the Shirley Jackson Award for Best Short Fiction.

== Winners and Finalists ==
* Winners

Year	Author	Novel	Originally Published In:	Ref.
2007	Nathan Ballingrud*	"The Monsters of Heaven"	Inferno, Tor Books	
2007	M. Rickert	"Holiday"	Subterranean #7, 2007	
2007	Elizabeth Ziemska	"A Murder of Crows"	Tin House #31, Spring 2007	
2007	Carrie Laben	"Something in the Mermaid Way"	Clarkesworld Magazine, March 2007	
2007	Jeff VanderMeer	"The Third Bear"	Clarkesworld Magazine, April 2007	
2007	Andy Duncan	"Unique Chicken Goes in Reverse"	Eclipse One, Night Shade Books	
2008	Michael Bishop*	"The Pile"	Subterranean Online, Winter 2008	
2008	Conrad Williams	"68° 07' 15'N, 31° 36' 44'W"	Fast Ships, Black Sails	
2008	Joshua Ferris	"The Dinner Party"	The New Yorker, August 2008	
2008	M. Rickert	"Evidence of Love in a Case of Abandonment: One Daughter’s Personal Account"	F&SF, Oct/Nov 2008	
2008	Karen Heuler	"The Inner City"	Cemetery Dance #58, 2008	
2008	Nadia Bulkin	"Intertropical Convergence Zone"	Chizine #37, 2008	
2009	Karen Joy Fowler*	"The Pelican Bar"	Eclipse #3	
2009	Dale Bailey; Nathan Ballingrud	"The Crevasse"	Lovecraft Unbound	
2009	Laird Barron	"Strappado"	Poe	
2009	Aimee Bender	"Faces"	The Paris Review, Winter 2009	
2009	Gemma Files	"The Jacaranda Smile"	Apparitions	
2009	Jonathan Lethem	"Procedure in Plain Air"	The New Yorker, October 2009	
2010	Peter Watts*	"The Things"	Clarkesworld Magazine, Jan 2010	
2010	Caitlín R. Kiernan	"As Red As Red"	Haunted Legends	
2010	Karen Joy Fowler	"Booth's Ghost"	What I Didn’t See and Other Stories	
2010	Lily Hoang	"The Foxes"	Haunted Legends	
2010	Laird Barron	"six six six"	Occultation	
2011	M. Rickert*	"The Corpse Painter's Masterpiece"	SF&F, Sept/Oct 2011	
2011	Joan Aiken	"Hair"	The Monkey's Wedding and Other Stories	
2011	Nathan Ballingrud	"Sunbleached"	Teeth	
2011	Nadia Bulkin	"Absolute Zero"	Creatures: Thirty Years of Monsters	
2011	Jason Ockert	"Max"	The Iowa Review	
2011	Genevieve Valentine	"Things to Know About Being Dead"	Teeth	
2012	Jeffrey Ford*	"A Natural History of Autumn"	F&SF, July/August 2012	
2012	Dan Chaon	"How We Escaped Our Certain Fate"	21st Century Dead	
2012	Dan Chaon	"Little America"	Shadow Show: All New Stories in Celebration of Ray Bradbury, Morrow	
2012	Margo Lanagan	"Bajazzle"	Cracklescape	
2012	Kelly Link	"Two Houses"	Shadow Show: All New Stories in Celebration of Ray Bradbury, Morrow	
2012	Tamsyn Muir	"The Magician's Apprentice"	Weird Tales #359	
2013	Sam J. Miller*	"57 Reasons for the Slate Quarry Suicides"	Nightmare Magazine, December 2013	
2013	Livia Llewellyn	"Furnace"	Grimscribe’s Puppets	
2013	Maureen McHugh	"The Memory Book"	Queen Victoria’s Book of Spells: An Anthology of Gaslamp Fantasy	
2013	Paul Park	"The Statue in the Garden"	Exotic Gothic 5	
2013	Robert Shearman	"That Tiny Flutter of the Heart"	Psycho-Mania!	
2013	Maria Dahvana Headley	"The Traditional"	Lightspeed, May 2013	
2014	Alison Littlewood*	"The Dogs Home"	The Spectral Book of Horror Stories, Spectral Press	
2014	Siobhan Carroll	"Wendigo Nights"	Fearful Symmetries	
2014	Chikodili Emelumadu	"Candy Girl"	Apex Magazine, November 2014	
2014	Garth Nix	"Shay Corsham Worsted"	Fearful Symmetries	
2014	Alyssa Wong	"The Fisher Queen"	F&SF, May/June 2014	
2015	Lynda E. Rucker*	"The Dying Season"	Aickman's Heirs	
2015	Nadia Bulkin	"Seven Minutes in Heaven"	Aickman's Heirs	
2015	Shannon Peavey	"A Beautiful Memory"	Apex Magazine, March 2015	
2015	Letitia Trent	"Wilderness"	Exigencies	
2015	Alyssa Wong	"Hungry Daughters of Starving Mothers"	Nightmare Magazine, October 2015	
2016	Carrie Laben*	"Postcards from Natalie"	The Dark, July 2016	
2016	Karen Heuler	"The Apartments"	Other Places	
2016	Katie Knoll	"Red"	The Masters Review, October 2016	
2016	Sam J. Miller	"Things With Beards"	Clarkesworld Magazine, June 2016	
2016	Irenosen Okojie	"Animal Parts"	Speak, Gigantular	
2017	Kurt Fawver*	"The Convexity of Our Youth"	Looming Low, Volume 1	
2017	Nadia Bulkin	"Live Through This"	Looming Low, Volume 1	
2017	Brian Evenson	"The Second Door"	Looming Low, Volume 1	
2017	Camilla Grudova	"The Mouse Queen"	The Doll's Alphabet	
2017	Carmen Maria Machado	"Blur"	Tin House, Summer 2017	
2018	Christina Wood Martinez*	"The Astronaut"	Granta, Winter 2018	
2018	David Hansen	"Hell"	Fairy Tale Review, March 2018	
2018	Bracken MacLeod	"Back Seat"	Lost Highways	
2018	Aoko Matsuda	"The Woman Dies"	Granta, Summer 2018	
2018	Tim Waggoner	"How to be a Horror Writer"	Vastarien, Summer 2018	
2019	Indrapramit Das*	"Kali_Na"	The Mythic Dream	
2019	Theodora Goss	"How to Become a Witch-Queen"	Hex Life: Wicked New Tales of Witchery	
2019	Nick Straatmann	"The Truth About Josh Enloe"	Parhelion	
2019	Mariana Enríquez (author); Megan McDowell (translator)	"The Well"	The Southern Review, Issue 55.1	
2019	Gina Ochsner	"Whistle, My Lad, and I Will Come"	The Pink Issue of Fairy Tale Review	
2020	R. A. Busby*	"Not the Man I Married"	Black Petals, Autumn 2020	
2020	R. A. Busby	"Holes"	Graveyard Smash	
2020	Roxane Gay	"Graceful Burdens"	Amazon Original Stories	
2020	Franki Haber	"The Memory Game"	The Gravity of the Thing, Spring 2020	
2020	Tobi Ogundiran	"Isn't Your Daughter Such a Doll"	Shoreline of Infinity #18	
2020	Eden Royce	"Room and Board Included, Demonology Extra"	Eyedolon, June 2020	
2021	Isabel J. Kim*	"You’ll Understand When You're a Mom Someday"	khōréō, August 2021	
2021	L.D. Lewis	"Dizzy in the Weeds"	Unfettered Hexes: Queer Tales of Insatiable Darkness	
2021	Nicasio Andres Reed	"Human Reason"	Unfettered Hexes: Queer Tales of Insatiable Darkness	
2021	Carlie St. George	"Forward, Victoria"	The Dark, April 2021	
2021	Gordon B. White	"Gordon B. White is Creating Haunting Weird Horror"	Nightmare Magazine, July 2021	
2022	Kim Fu*	"Pre-Simulation Consultation XF007867"	Lesser Known Monsters of the 21st Century	
2022	Viktor Athelstan	"Brother Maternitas"	Your Body is Not Your Body	
2022	Emily Mitchell	"The Church of Divine Electricity"	The Southern Review	
2022	Ian Muneshwar	"Dick Pig"	Nightmare Magazine, January 2022	
2022	Wendy N. Wagner	"Halogen Sky"	Vastarien, June 2022	
2023	Laura Blackwell*	"The First Mrs. Edward Rochester Would Like a Word"	Aseptic and Faintly Sadistic	
2023	Lesley Nneka Arimah	"Invasion of the Baby Snatchers"	Out There Screaming	
2023	Sciascia DeKay	"Kazti Girls"	The Fabulist	
2023	Jo Kaplan	"Something is Rotten"	Shakespeare Unleashed	
2023	Kristina Ten	"The Dizzy Room"	Nightmare Magazine, March 2023	
2024	Arkady Martine*	"Three Faces of a Beheading"	Uncanny Magazine, May-June 2024	
2024	Caroline Hung	"Moon Rabbit Song"	Nightmare Magazine, November 2024	
2024	Manish Melwani	"MAMMOTH"	Nightmare Magazine, June 2024	
2024	Kristina Ten	"Kamchatka"	Washington Square Review, Spring 2024	
2024	Jessica P. Wick	"Strike"	Monsters in the Mills	
2025	Kaaron Warren*	"Bitter Skin"	Night & Day	
2025	Kirsty Logan	"Lapse"	Unquiet Guests	
2025	Audrey Zhou	"Mother's Mother's Daughter"	Silk and Sinew: A Collection of Folk Horror from the Asian Diaspora	
2025	Caroline Kepnes	"Room 24"	The End of the World As We Know It	
2025	Donna Lynch	"Silver Boots"	HOWL: An Anthology of Werewolves from Women-in-Horror	
