= Carrie Laben =

American writer

Carrie-Edmund Laben
- Born: 1978 (age 47–48)
- Other name: Carrie Laben
- Education: Cornell University (BS); University of Montana (MFA)
- Occupation: Writer
- Writing career
- Genres: Horror; Weird
- Notable works: A Hawk in the Woods (2019); Smoke Season (2026)
- Notable awards: Shirley Jackson Award (2016)

Carrie-Edmund Laben (born 1978) who has also published as Carrie Laben, is an American writer of horror and weird fiction. Their story "Postcards from Natalie" won the 2016 Shirley Jackson Award for Short Fiction. They are the author of the novels A Hawk in the Woods (2019) and Smoke Season (2026).

== Early life and education ==
Laben grew up in western New York. They earned a BS from Cornell University and an MFA from the University of Montana. They live in Queens, New York.

== Career ==
Laben's short fiction has appeared in Clarkesworld, The Dark, Apex, Indiana Review and Outlook Springs. Their story "Something in the Mermaid Way", published in Clarkesworld in March 2007, was nominated for the inaugural Shirley Jackson Award for Best Short Story. "Postcards from Natalie", published in The Dark in July 2016, won the 2016 Shirley Jackson Award for Best Short Fiction, presented at Readercon in July 2017.

Also in 2017, Laben won the Documentary Essay Prize for Writing from the Center for Documentary Studies at Duke University for the essay "The Wrong Place", which draws on their experience as a birdwatcher. They have held residencies including the Anne LaBastille Memorial Writer's Residency (2015), a MacDowell residency (2018) and the Brush Creek Residency (2019).

Laben's debut novel, A Hawk in the Woods, was published by Word Horde in March 2019. It follows twin sisters with supernatural abilities who return to their family's cabin in Minnesota. The novel received a starred review from Publishers Weekly, which called it a "gruesome, wry horror story", and from Foreword Reviews. Reviewers noted its debt to H. P. Lovecraft's "The Thing on the Doorstep".

Their second novel, Smoke Season, was published by Word Horde on June 30, 2026. The publisher describes it as a novel in the tradition of Arthur Machen.

Laben has also written nonfiction about birds for the blog 10,000 Birds and Birding magazine.

== Awards and honors ==
Year	Award	Work	Result
2007	Shirley Jackson Award for Best Short Fiction	"Something in the Mermaid Way"	Nominated
2016	Shirley Jackson Award for Best Short Fiction	"Postcards from Natalie"	Won
2017	CDS Documentary Essay Prize (Writing)	"The Wrong Place"	Won

== Bibliography ==
=== Novels ===
- A Hawk in the Woods (Word Horde, 2019)
- Smoke Season (Word Horde, 2026)

=== Selected short fiction ===
- "Something in the Mermaid Way" (2007), Clarkesworld Magazine, March 2007
- "Postcards from Natalie" (2016), The Dark, issue 14, July 2016
