= Thomas Ha =

American fiction writer

- Born: Honolulu, Hawaii, U.S.
- Occupations: Writer; Lawyer
- Writing career
- Genres: speculative fiction, dark fantasy, science fiction, weird horror
- Notable awards: Nebula Award (2025); Hugo Award (2026); Locus Award (2026)
- Website: www.thomashawrites.com

Thomas Ha is an American speculative fiction writer. His short stories have won multiple awards, including the Hugo Award and Nebula Award. His debut collection, Uncertain Sons and Other Stories, received the Philip K. Dick Award Special Citation, Locus Award, and World Fantasy Award.

== Early life and background ==
Thomas Ha was born in Honolulu, Hawaii. He was educated on the American East Coast, and worked as an attorney in New York before moving to Los Angeles to care for his family. He is of Korean and Irish-American descent.

== Career ==
His first fiction was published in 2020 in The Colored Lens before being published in various genre magazines, including Clarkesworld, Beneath Ceaseless Skies, Metaphorosis Magazine, Nightmare Magazine, and Lightspeed.

Ha writes short fiction, primarily dark fantasy and science fiction, with touches of weird horror, which he says is a cathartic response to the terrifying nature of the world. "Much of what I gravitate to in horror is that feeling of being overwhelmed by the threat you can’t confront—the unseeable force, the creeping thing, the presence on the other side of the door. And the subsequent question that logically springs from that: what do you do? Horror, for me, usually supplies a kind of answer..."

His debut short story collection, Uncertain Sons and Other Stories, was published by Undertow Publications in September 2025. The book was named one of the "Best New Horror of 2025" by the New York Public Library.

Ha has been nominated for numerous awards, including the Ignyte Award, Bram Stoker Award, and Shirley Jackson Award. His work has won the Hugo Award, Nebula Award, World Fantasy Award, and two Locus Awards.

== Bibliography ==
=== Collections ===
- Uncertain Sons and Other Stories. Undertow Publications. 2025. ISBN 9781988964492.

=== Short Fiction ===
- "Hold on Tight", 2020, The Colored Lens
- "Where the Old Neighbors Go", 2020, Metaphorosis Magazine
- "Balloon Season", 2020, Fusion Fragment
- "Horangi", 2021, Cossmass Infinities
- "A Compilation of Accounts Concerning the Distal Brook Flood", 2021, Metaphorosis Magazine
- "Where You Left Me", 2021, Lightspeed Magazine
- "The Liminal Men", 2021, Dark Matter Magazine
- "Orla, Always", 2021, Metaphorosis Magazine
- "To People Who’d Never Known Good", 2022, Beneath Ceaseless Skies
- "Sweetbaby", 2022, Clarkesworld
- "In That Crumbling Home", 2022, Bourbon Penn
- "Our Quiet Guests", 2022, Three-Lobed Burning Eye
- "For However Long", 2023, Khōréō Magazine
- "On Planetary Palliative Care", 2023, Interzone Digital
- "Window Boy", 2023, Clarkesworld
- "Cretins", 2023, Weird Horror Magazine
- "Gentler Things", 2023, PodCastle
- "The Mub", 2023, Clarkesworld
- "To Be a Happy Man", 2024, Lightspeed Magazine
- "Behind the Gilded Door", 2024, Haven Speculative
- "Alabama Circus Punk", 2024, Ergot
- "The Brotherhood of Montague St. Video", 2024, Clarkesworld
- "Grottmata", 2024, Nightmare Magazine
- "The Fairgrounds", 2024, Metaphorosis Magazine
- "The Sort", 2024, Clarkesworld
- "Cages", 2024, Fusion Fragment
- "House Traveler", 2024, Bourbon Penn
- "St. Fario's Feast", 2024, New Edge Sword & Sorcery Magazine
- "Old Wells", 2025, Three-Lobed Burning Eye
- "In My Country", 2025, Clarkesworld
- "Cry, the Carob King", 2025, Beneath Ceaseless Skies
- "The Patron", 2025, The Sunday Morning Transport
- "The Cephalophore", 2025, The Dark
- "Uncertain Sons", 2025, Uncertain Sons and Other Stories
- "The Folded Balloon", 2026, Simultaneous Times
- "Scion" and "Scion: Afterword", 2026, Clarkesworld
- "Middle Song", 2025, Bourbon Penn
- "Our Revels Now Are Ended", 2026, Clarkesworld
- "Jempo", 2026, Lightspeed Magazine
- "Drive-Thru", forthcoming December 2026, Reactor Magazine

=== Anthologies ===
- Paula Guran, ed. (2021). The Year's Best Dark Fantasy & Horror: Volume Two. Pyr. ISBN 9781645060321.
- Hugh Howey; John Joseph Adams, eds. (2024). The Best American Science Fiction and Fantasy 2024. Mariner Books. ISBN 9780063315785.
- Alex Woodroe, ed. (2024). Brave New Weird: The Best New Weird Horror, Volume Two. Tenebrous Press. ISBN 9781959790068.
- Michael Kelly, ed. (2025). The Best Weird Fiction of the Year, Vol. 1. Undertow Publications. ISBN 9781988964522.
- Nnedi Okorafor; John Joseph Adams, eds. (2025). The Best American Science Fiction and Fantasy 2025. Mariner Books. ISBN 9780063441477.
- Olivie Blake; John Joseph Adams, eds. (2026). The Best American Science Fiction and Fantasy 2026. Mariner Books. ISBN 9780063441521.

== Awards ==
Year	Title	Award	Category	Result	Ref
2022	"Sweetbaby"	Shirley Jackson Award	Novelette	Finalist	
2022	"In That Crumbling Home"	Brave New Weird Award		Won	
2023	"Window Boy"	Nebula Award	Short Story	Finalist	
2024	"Window Boy"	Ignyte Award	Short Story	Finalist	
2024	"Window Boy"	Locus Award	Short Story	Finalist	
2024	"The Brotherhood of Montague St. Video"	Nebula Award	Novelette	Finalist	
2025	"The Brotherhood of Montague St. Video"	Hugo Award	Novelette	Finalist	
2025	"Uncertain Sons"	Bram Stoker Award	Long Fiction	Finalist	
2025	"Uncertain Sons"	Nebula Award	Novelette	Won	
2025	Uncertain Sons and Other Stories	BSFA Award	Collection/Anthology	Finalist	
2025	"In My Country"	Nebula Award	Short Story	Finalist	
2026	"In My Country"	Hugo Award	Short Story	Won	
2026	"In My Country"	Locus Award	Short Story	Won	
2026	"In My Country"	World Fantasy Award	Short Fiction	Finalist	
2026	"Uncertain Sons"	Ignyte Award	Novelette	Finalist	
2026	"Uncertain Sons"	Locus Award	Novelette	Finalist	
2026	"Uncertain Sons"	World Fantasy Award	Novella	Finalist	
2026	Uncertain Sons and Other Stories	Locus Award	Collection	Won	
2026	Uncertain Sons and Other Stories	Philip K. Dick Award	—	Special Citation	
2026	Uncertain Sons and Other Stories	World Fantasy Award	Collection	Won	
