= Christina Wood Martinez =

American writer and editor

- Born: 1986 (age 39–40); San Diego, California
- Other name: Christina Wood
- Education: University of California, San Diego (BA); Washington University in St. Louis (MFA); University of Georgia (PhD)
- Occupations: Writer, editor
- Writing career
- Genres: Literary fiction, short story
- Notable work: "The Astronaut" (2018)
- Notable awards: Shirley Jackson Award (2018)

Christina Wood Martinez (born 1986), who now publishes as Christina Wood, is an American short story writer and editor. Her story "The Astronaut", published in Granta, won the 2018 Shirley Jackson Award for Best Short Fiction. She is the managing editor of the New England Review.

== Early life and education ==
Wood Martinez was born in 1986 and is from San Diego, California. She earned an MFA in creative writing from Washington University in St. Louis and a PhD in English and creative writing from the University of Georgia.

== Career ==
=== Writing ===
Her short fiction has appeared in The Paris Review, Granta, McSweeney's, Virginia Quarterly Review and other journals, and her nonfiction in the Los Angeles Review of Books. Her story "The Astronaut" was published in Granta 142 in 2018. It won the 2018 Shirley Jackson Award for Best Short Fiction, presented at Readercon in July 2019, and received a "Distinguished Stories" mention in The Best American Short Stories 2019. A Spanish translation by Lola Ortiz Vargas appeared in Letralia in 2020.

She received a deGroot Foundation Writer of Note Grant for a novel in progress.

=== Editing ===
Wood worked for four years as an editor at Dorothy, a Publishing Project. In 2020 she founded and edited echoverse, a digital anthology of writing and art about place, environment and climate change. She has also been an editor at Brink Books and during her doctoral studies, graduate editor of The Georgia Review. In August 2026 she became managing editor of the New England Review at Middlebury College.

She has taught creative writing and composition at Washington University in St. Louis, Southern Illinois University Carbondale and the University of Georgia.

== Awards and honors ==
Year	Award	Work	Result
2018	Shirley Jackson Award (Best Short Fiction)	"The Astronaut"	Won
2019	The Best American Short Stories, Distinguished Stories	"The Astronaut"	Listed

== Selected works ==
- "The Astronaut", Granta 142: Animalia (2018)
- "Dreamers", McSweeney's 61 (2020)
