= Jordan Kurella =

American science fiction, fantasy and horror short fiction author

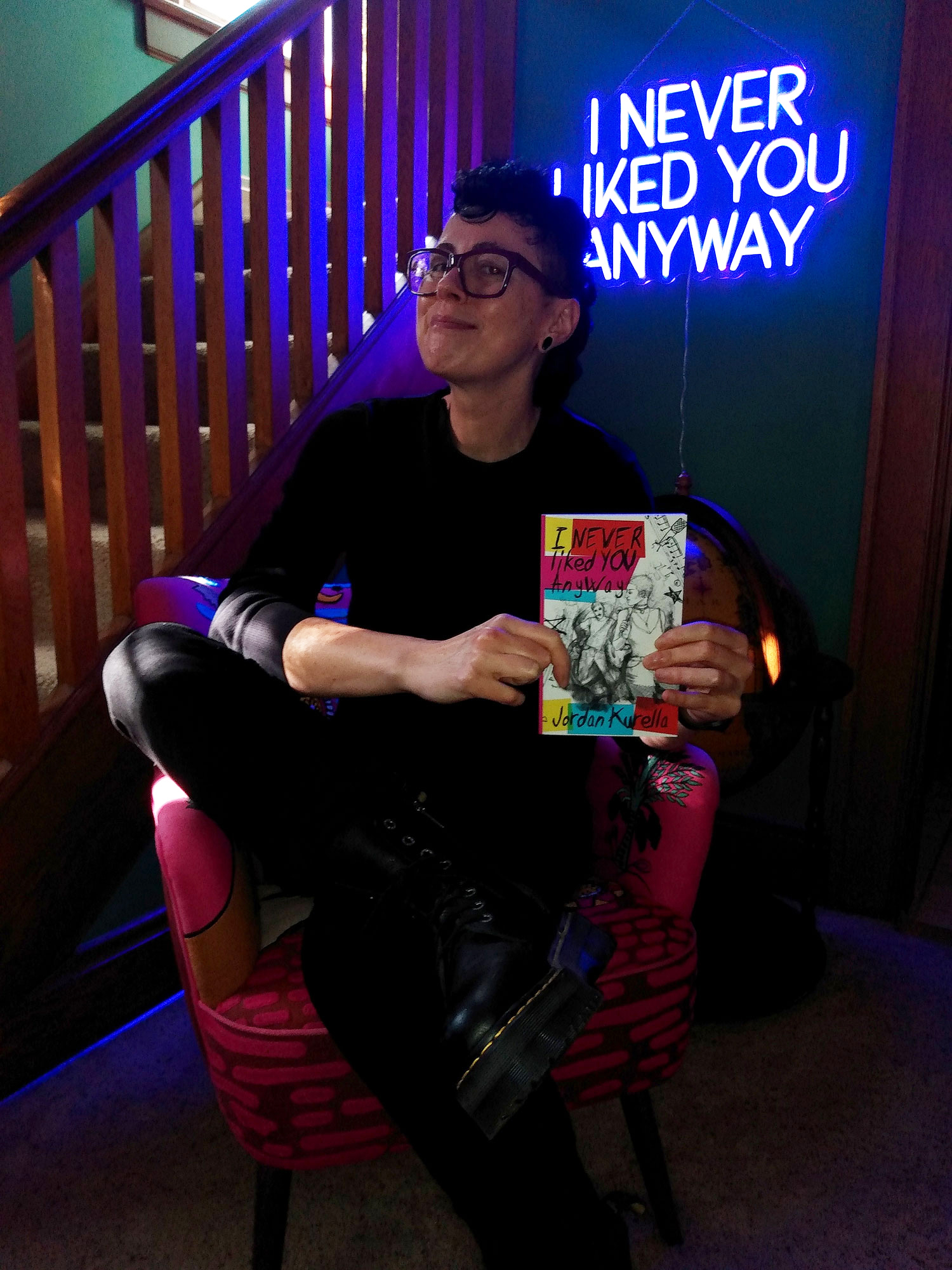
- Jordan Kurella holding a copy of his book I Never Liked You Anyway.
- Occupation: Writer
- Writing career
- Language: English
- Years active: 2015–present
- Genres: Science fiction, fantasy, horror
- Notable works: The Death of Mountains, I Never Liked You Anyway

Jordan Kurella is an American fantasy and horror author. His fiction, which has been described as new weird "with a strong moral bent," has won the Shirley Jackson Award and been a finalist for the Nebula Award, the Los Angeles Times Book Prize, and the Theodore Sturgeon Award.

== Biography ==
Kurella lives in Columbus, Ohio, and graduated from Kenyon College in 1999. He is transgender and disabled and has previously worked as a photographer, radio station disc jockey, and social worker.

== Career ==
Kurella initially wrote literary fiction, but published only a single short story before realizing that he preferred to write fantasy and horror stories. Since then, his short fiction has been published in Beneath Ceaseless Skies, Three-Lobed Burning Eye, Apex Magazine, and Lightspeed Magazine. In 2024, his short story "Evan: A Remainder" was published by Reactor Magazine and named a finalist for the Nebula Award and the Theodore Sturgeon Award.

His first book of long fiction, I Never Liked You Anyway, was released in 2022 by the small press Vernacular and selected as a finalist for the Nebula Award for Best Novella. His follow-up novella The Death of Mountains was released in 2025 by Lethe Press. The Death of Mountains won the Shirley Jackson Award for Best Novella and was named a finalist for both the 2025 Los Angeles Times Book Prize in Science Fiction, Fantasy, and Speculative Fiction and the Nebula Award.

He has also served on the board of directors of the Science Fiction and Fantasy Writers of America

== Critical reception ==
Kurella's stories have been noted for being "serious, thoughtful, melancholy" and carried by "beautifully rendered characters and their voices." His stories have also been noted to belong to the new weird genre and described as haunting allegories "with a strong moral bent.

The Ancillary Review of Books called Kurella's novella The Death of Mountains "a delightful, thoughtful, moving story of a mountain who doesn’t want to die, and the Death that doesn’t want to kill her." Publishers Weekly called the book "a fabulist take on the cli-fi formula that makes a powerful case for the triumph of the natural world."

Publishers Weekly called his novella I Never Liked You Anyway "funny, sexy, and wrenching" while also noting that "Kurella's beautifully queer take on this story shows Eurydice's full and compelling humanity."

== Bibliography ==
=== Novellas ===
- The Death of Mountains (Lethe Press, 2025)

- Winner of the Shirley Jackson Award
- Finalist for the Nebula Award for Best Novella
- Finalist for the Los Angeles Times Book Prize in Science Fiction, Fantasy, and Speculative Fiction
- Finalist for the World Fantasy Award—Novella

- I Never Liked You Anyway (Vernacular, 2022)

- Finalist for the Nebula Award for Best Novella

=== Short Story Collections ===
- When I Was Lost (Trepidatio Press, 2022)

=== Selected Short Fiction ===
- "All Her Rows of Teeth" (Three-Lobed Burning Eye, 2024)

- Longlisted for the Locus Award.

- "Evan: A Remainder" (Reactor, 2024)

- Finalist for the Nebula Award for Best Short Story
- Longlisted for the Hugo Award for Best Short Story
