= E. A. Petricone =

American writer

- Education: Hampshire College (BA); Lesley University (MFA)
- Occupation: Writer
- Writing career
- Genres: Horror; Speculative fiction
- Notable works: "We, the Girls Who Did Not Make It" (2021)
- Notable awards: Shirley Jackson Award (2021)

E. A. Petricone is an American writer of horror and speculative fiction. Her novelette "We, the Girls Who Did Not Make It" won the 2021 Shirley Jackson Award for Best Novelette.

== Background ==
Petricone holds a BA from Hampshire College and an MFA from Lesley University. She lives in Massachusetts.

== Career ==
Petricone's short fiction has appeared in Nightmare, Apparition Literary Magazine, Slice, Metaphorosis, Liminality and All Worlds Wayfarer. Her artwork has appeared in Strange Horizons.

Her novelette "We, the Girls Who Did Not Make It" was published in the February 2021 issue of Nightmare. It is narrated by the ghosts of thirteen young women killed in the same basement, who watch as their murderers lure a fourteenth victim. In an interview with the magazine, Petricone said the collective narration was partly a nod to the chorus of Greek tragedy. The story was included on the 2021 Locus Recommended Reading List and won the 2021 Shirley Jackson Award for Best Novelette, presented at the Boston Book Festival in October 2022.

== Awards and honors ==
Year	Award	Work	Result
2021	Shirley Jackson Award, Novelette	"We, the Girls Who Did Not Make It"	Won
2021	Locus Recommended Reading List (Novelette)	"We, the Girls Who Did Not Make It"	Listed

== Selected works ==
- "We, the Girls Who Did Not Make It", Nightmare 101 (February 2021)
