= Jen Fawkes =

American fiction writer

- Occupation: Writer
- Writing career
- Genres: Literary fiction Fabulism; Historical fantasy
- Notable works: Mannequin and Wife (2020); Tales the Devil Told Me (2021); Daughters of Chaos (2024)
- Notable awards: Porter Fund Literary Prize (2021); Phillip H. McMath Post-Publication Book Award (2023)

Jen Fawkes is an American fiction writer. She has won the Pinch Award in Fiction (2019), John Gardner Memorial Fiction Prize (2019), Press 53 Award for Short Fiction (2020) for Tales the Devil Told Me, and the Phillip H. McMath Post-Publication Book Award (Fiction) for Mannequin and Wife. Her debut story collection, Mannequin and Wife (2020), was a finalist for the Shirley Jackson Award for Best Single-Author Collection.

== Career ==
Fawkes's short fiction has appeared in One Story, Lit Hub, The Iowa Review, Crazyhorse and Best Small Fictions, and has won prizes including the 2019 Pinch Award in Fiction and the 2019 John Gardner Memorial Fiction Prize from Harpur Palate.

Mannequin and Wife, published by LSU Press in September 2020, collects stories that range across psychological and magical realism, examining relationships between mothers and children, spouses, and mentors and protégés. It was a finalist for the 2020 Shirley Jackson Award for Best Single-Author Collection and won the 2023 Phillip H. McMath Post-Publication Book Award in fiction.

Tales the Devil Told Me won the 2020 Press 53 Award for Short Fiction and was published by Press 53 in October 2021. Its stories reimagine fairy tales and literary classics from the perspective of villains and minor characters, including Rumpelstiltskin, Medusa and the witch from "Hansel and Gretel". It was a finalist for the 2022 World Fantasy Award for Single-Author Collection. Reviewing it for Locus, Rich Horton described the stories as witty, dark, extravagant and savage.

Fawkes's debut novel, Daughters of Chaos, was published by the Overlook Press, an imprint of Abrams Books, on July 9, 2024. Set in Nashville during the American Civil War. Kirkus Reviews called it a "dazzling feminist tale" and the novel received a starred review from Publishers Weekly. Horton, writing in Black Gate, called it "a first rate first novel".

== Awards and honors ==
Year	Award	Work	Result
2019	Pinch Award in Fiction		Won
2019	John Gardner Memorial Fiction Prize (Harpur Palate)		Won
2020	Press 53 Award for Short Fiction	Tales the Devil Told Me	Won
2020	Shirley Jackson Award, Best Single-Author Collection	Mannequin and Wife	Nominated
2021	Porter Fund Literary Prize, Fiction		Won
2022	World Fantasy Award, Collection	Tales the Devil Told Me	Nominated
2023	Phillip H. McMath Post-Publication Book Award (Fiction)	Mannequin and Wife	Won

== Bibliography ==
- Mannequin and Wife: Stories (LSU Press, 2020)
- Tales the Devil Told Me (Press 53, 2021)
- Daughters of Chaos (Overlook Press, 2024)
