= Sam J. Miller =

English science fiction, fantasy and horror short fiction author

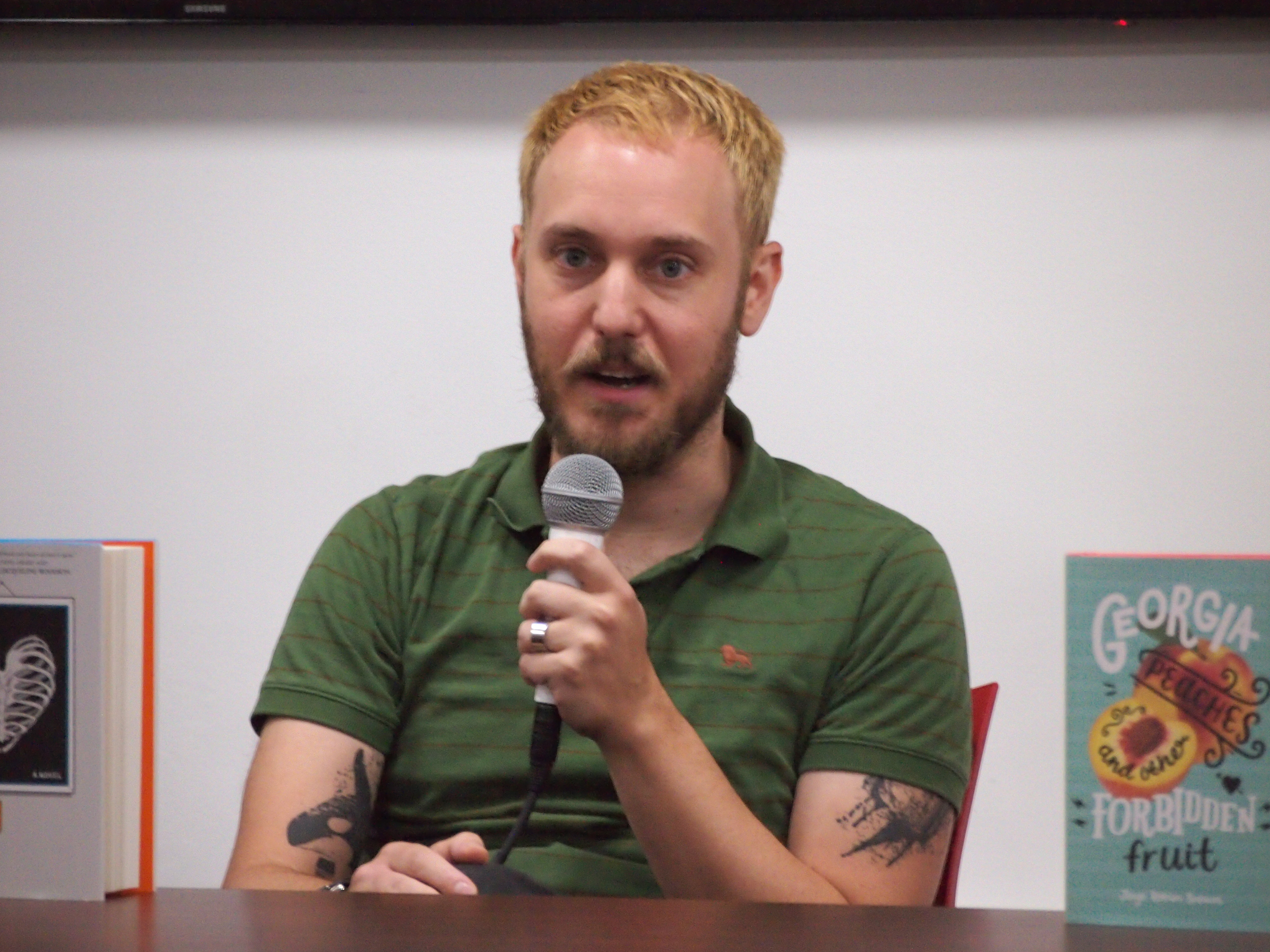
- Born: Sam Joshua Miller; February 7, 1979 (age 47)
- Education: Rutgers University (BA)
- Occupation: Writer
- Writing career
- Language: English
- Years active: 2008–present
- Genres: Science fiction, fantasy, horror
- Notable works: The Art of Starving; Blackfish City
- Notable awards: Shirley Jackson Award (2013); Campbell Memorial Award (2019); Locus Award (2023)
- Website: samjmiller.com

Sam J. Miller (born February 7, 1979) is an American science fiction, fantasy, and horror author. His stories have appeared in magazines such as Clarkesworld, Asimov's Science Fiction, Lightspeed, and more. They've been reprinted in over 15 "Year's Best" collections. He has been a finalist for the Nebula Award, World Fantasy Award, and Theodore Sturgeon Award. His short story "57 Reasons for the Slate Quarry Suicides" won the 2013 Shirley Jackson Award.

His second novel, Blackfish City, won the 2019 John W. Campbell Memorial Award.

== Early life and education ==
Sam J. Miller grew up in Hudson, New York, where his family ran a butcher shop. He attended Rutgers University, where he studied Cinema Studies and Russian language and literature. He grew up Jewish and lives with his husband in New York City, where he works as a community organizer for a homelessness organization.

Miller was a member of the 2012 Clarion Workshop, studying under authors Holly Black, Cassandra Clare, and Ted Chiang.

== Career ==
Miller began publishing stories in ’zines and online in the early 2000s, but didn't make his first pro-sale until 2013. His short story "57 Reasons for the Slate Quarry Suicides" (Nightmare Magazine) won the 2013 Shirley Jackson Award for Best Short Fiction. His other stories have been published in magazines such as Clarkesworld, Asimov's Science Fiction, Apex Magazine, and Lightspeed. His stories have been reprinted in over 15 "Year's Best" story collections and have been a finalist for multiple Nebula Awards, along with the World Fantasy Award and Theodore Sturgeon Memorial Award.

Miller states that he writes "speculative fiction because that's how the world looks to me. Life is magic. Human society is horror. The world is science fiction." While Miller deals with politics in his work as a community organizer, he says that "arguing a political point is a pretty good way to kill a story. But I do think it's possible to explore in fiction the issues that are important to us. That's the writing that excites me the most." "I love activism narratives. I love narratives about fighting back. As much as I love reading about what scares me, I love reading about how we fight back…"

Miller's prose has been called "evocative," "disturbing," and "grim stuff, but compelling."

Miller's young adult novel The Art of Starving was released by HarperCollins in July 2017. The novel is about a gay, bullied teenage boy who believes that extreme hunger awakens supernatural abilities and is rooted in Miller's own experience with an adolescent eating disorder. It was a finalist for the 2018 Lodestar Award for Best Young Adult Book (formerly titled the World Science Fiction Society Award) and won the 2017 Andre Norton Award for Young Adult Science Fiction and Fantasy.

His first novel for adults, Blackfish City, was released in April 2018 by Ecco Press. His second young adult novel, Destroy All Monsters, was published by HarperTeen in 2019. His second adult novel, The Blade Between, was published by Ecco Press in 2020. Both Blackfish City and The Blade Between received starred reviews from Kirkus Reviews.

Miller's first short-fiction collection, Boys, Beasts & Men, was published in May 2022 by Tachyon Publications. The collection contains both previously published and unpublished stories, as well as an introduction by Amal El-Mohtar. In Paula Guran's review for Locus, she said of Miller's writing, "Only an assemblage like this can truly display his talent, versatility, imagination, and flat-out uniqueness... His tales invariably strike deep into both a reader’s heart and gut." Boys, Beasts & Men was a finalist for the 2023 World Fantasy Award for Best Collection. It won the 2023 Locus Award for Best Collection.

In October 2025, Miller released the short novel, Red Star Hustle, from Saga Doubles, in a two-sided book with Mary Robinette Kowal's Apprehension. The double-sided book is made up of "two expertly crafted crime stories set in a far-future science fiction universe..." It was named one of Lit Hub's "33 Most Anticipated Sci-Fi, Fantasy, and Horror Books for the Rest of 2025".

== Awards and nominations ==
- "Calved" (Asimov's Science Fiction, September 2015) was third-placed in the 2016 Asimov's Reader Poll for Best Short Story.

Year	Title	Award	Category	Result	Ref
2013	"57 Reasons for Slate Quarry Suicides"	Shirley Jackson Award	Short Fiction	Won	
2014	"The Beasts We Want To Be"	Locus Award	Short Story	Finalist	
2014	'"We Are the Cloud"	Nebula Award	Novelette	Finalist	
2015	'"We Are the Cloud"	Theodore Sturgeon Award	—	Nominated	
2015	"When Your Child Strays from God"	Nebula Award	Short Story	Finalist	
2016	"The Heat of Us: Notes Toward an Oral History"	World Fantasy Award	Short Fiction	Finalist	
2016	"Things With Beards"	Nebula Award	Novelette	Finalist	
2016	"Things With Beards"	Shirley Jackson Award	Short Fiction	Finalist	
2017	"Things With Beards"	Theodore Sturgeon Award	—	Nominated	
2017	"Angel, Monster, Man"	Shirley Jackson Award	Novelette	Finalist	
2017	The Art of Starving	Andre Norton Award	—	Won	
2018	The Art of Starving	Crawford Award	—	Shortlisted	
2018	The Art of Starving	Lodestar Award	—	Shortlisted	
2018	The Art of Starving	Locus Award	First Novel	Finalist	
2018	Blackfish City	Nebula Award	Best Novel	Finalist	
2019	Blackfish City	Campbell Memorial Award	—	Won	
2020	Destroy All Monsters	Locus Award	Young Adult Novel	Finalist	
2021	"Let All the Children Boogie"	Nebula Award	Short Story	Finalist	
2022	"Let All the Children Boogie"	Locus Award	Short Story	Finalist	
2023	Boys, Beasts & Men	Locus Award	Collection	Won	
2023	Boys, Beasts & Men	World Fantasy Award	Collection	Finalist	
2026	"Courtney Lovecraft’s Book of the Dead"	Locus Award	Short Story	Finalist	

== Bibliography ==
=== Novels ===
- The Art of Starving (HarperCollins, 2017)
- Blackfish City (Ecco Press, 2018)
- Destroy All Monsters (HarperTeen, 2019)
- The Blade Between (Ecco Press, 2020)
- Red Star Hustle (Saga Doubles, 2025) (in double-sided book with Apprehension by Mary Robinette Kowal)

=== Collections ===
- Boys, Beasts & Men. Tachyon Publications. 2022. ISBN 9781616963729.

=== Anthology appearances ===
- The Best American Science Fiction and Fantasy 2015. Mariner Books. 2015. ISBN 9780544449848.
- The Best Science Fiction and Fantasy of the Year: Volume Ten. Solaris Books. 2016. ISBN 9781781084373.
- The Best Science Fiction of the Year: Volume 1. Night Shade Books. 2016. ISBN 9781597808545.
- The Year's Best Science Fiction: Thirty-Third Annual Collection. St. Martin’s Griffin. 2016. ISBN 9781250080844.
- The Best American Science Fiction and Fantasy 2016. Mariner Books. 2016. ISBN 9780544555204.
- Wilde Stories 2017: The Year's Best Gay Speculative Fiction. Lethe Press. 2017. ISBN 9781590216255.
- The Year's Best Weird Fiction: Volume 4. Undertow Publications. 2017. ISBN 978-0995094970.
- The Best Science Fiction and Fantasy of the Year: Volume Eleven. Solaris Books. 2017. ISBN 9781781085622.
- The Best Science Fiction of the Year: Volume 2. Night Shade Books. 2017. ISBN 9781597808965.
- The Year's Best Science Fiction: Thirty-Fourth Annual Collection. St. Martin’s Griffin. 2017. ISBN 9781250119230.
- The Year’s Best Science Fiction & Fantasy 2017. Solaris Books. 2017. ISBN 9781607014911.
- A People's Future of the United States. One World. 2019. ISBN 9780525508809.
- The Year's Best Dark Fantasy & Horror: Volume 1. Start Publishing LLC. 2020. ISBN 9781645060253.
- The Year’s Best Science Fiction & Fantasy Edition 2020. Prime Books. 2021. ISBN 9781607015383.
- The Best American Science Fiction and Fantasy 2022. Mariner Books. 2022. ISBN 9780358690122.
- The Big Book of Cyberpunk. Vintage Books. 2023. ISBN 978-0593467237.
- The Best American Science Fiction and Fantasy 2024. Mariner Books. 2024. ISBN 9780063315785.

=== Short fiction ===
Title	Year	First published	Reprinted/collected	Notes
"The Beasts We Want To Be"	2013	Electric Velocipede #27 (Winter 2013)	Boys, Beasts & Men (June 2022)	
"57 Reasons for the Slate Quarry Suicides"	2013	Nightmare Magazine #15 (December 2013)	Boys, Beasts & Men (June 2022)	
"Allosaurus Burgers"	2014	Shimmer Magazine #20 (July 2014)	Boys, Beasts & Men (June 2022)	
"We are the Cloud"	2014	Lightspeed #52 (August 2014)	Boys, Beasts & Men (June 2022); The Best American Science Fiction and Fantasy 2015 (October 2015)	Novelette
"The Heat of Us: Notes Toward an Oral History"	2015	Uncanny Magazine #2 (Jan/Feb 2015)	Boys, Beasts & Men (June 2022); The Best American Science Fiction and Fantasy 2016 (October 2016)	
"When Your Child Strays from God"	2015	Clarkesworld Magazine #106 (July 2015)	Boys, Beasts & Men (June 2022)	
"Ghosts of Home"	2015	Lightspeed #63 (August 2015)	Boys, Beasts & Men (June 2022); The Best Science Fiction and Fantasy of the Year: Volume Ten (May 2016)	
"Calved"	2015	Asimov's Science Fiction (September 2015)	Boys, Beasts & Men (June 2022); The Best Science Fiction and Fantasy of the Year: Volume Ten (May 2016); The Best Science Fiction of the Year: Volume 1 (June 2016); The Year’s Best Science Fiction: Thirty-Third Annual Collection (July 2016)	
"Angel, Monster, Man"	2016	Nightmare Magazine #40 (January 2016)	Boys, Beasts & Men (June 2022); Wilde Stories 2017: The Year's Best Gay Speculative Fiction (July 2017); The Year's Best Weird Fiction: Volume 4	Novelette
"Things With Beards"	2016	Clarkesworld Magazine #117 (June 2016)	Boys, Beasts & Men (June 2022); The Best Science Fiction and Fantasy of the Year: Volume Eleven (April 2017); The Best Science Fiction of the Year: Volume 2 (April 2017);The Year’s Best Science Fiction: Thirty-Fourth Annual Collection (July 2017); The Year’s Best Science Fiction & Fantasy 2017 (October 2017)	
"The Future of Hunger in the Age of Programmable Matter"	2017	Tor.com chapbook (October 2017)		
"Conspicuous Plumage"	2018	Lightspeed #100 (September 2018)	Boys, Beasts & Men (June 2022)	
"Last Gods"	2018	Clarkesworld Magazine #142 (July 2018)	The Best Science Fiction of the Year: Volume 2 (April 2017)	
"Shattered Sidewalks of the Human Heart"	2019	Clarkesworld Magazine #154 (July 2019)	Boys, Beasts & Men (June 2022); The Year's Best Dark Fantasy & Horror: Volume 1 (October 2020)	
"Shucked"	2019	The Magazine of Fantasy & Science Fiction #746 (Nov/Dec 2019)	Boys, Beasts & Men (June 2022); The Year's Best Science Fiction & Fantasy 2020 Edition (August 2021)	
"It Was Saturday Night, I Guess That Makes It All Right"	2019	A People’s Future of the United States (February 2019)		
"The Nation of the Sick"	2020	Entanglements: Tomorrow’s Lovers, Families, and Friends (Penguin House, 2020)		
"Let All the Children Boogie"	2021	Tor.com chapbook (January 2021)	The Best American Science Fiction and Fantasy 2022 (October 2022)	
"Darkness Metastatic"	2021	Nightmare Magazine #100 (January 2021)		
"Tyrannosaurus Hex"	2021	Uncanny Magazine (January 2021)		
"Feral Arcade Children of the American Northeast"	2021	The Southwest Review (August 2021)	The Big Book of Cyberpunk (September 2023)	
"Sun in an Empty Room"	2022	Boys, Beasts & Men (June 2022)		
Kid Wolf and Kraken Boy	2022	Solaris Satellites chapbook (July 2022), ISBN 978-1-78618-732-1		Novella
"A Field Guide to the Bear Men of Leningrad"	2023	The Kenyon Review (2023)		
"If Someone You Love Has Become a Vurdalak"	2023	The Dark Magazine #98 (July 2023)	The Best American Science Fiction and Fantasy 2024 (October 2024)	
"Courtney Lovecraft’s Book of the Dead"	2025	Nightmare Magazine #157 (October 2025)		
"The Cinema of Babel"	2026	Uncanny Magazine #71 (July 2026)		
"Jimmy James Jim"	2026	The Dark Magazine #138 (November 2026)		
