= Paula D. Ashe =

American writer

- Occupations: Writer, educator
- Writing career
- Genres: Horror, dark fiction
- Notable work: We Are Here to Hurt Each Other (2022)
- Notable awards: Shirley Jackson Award for Best Single-Author Collection (2022)

Paula D. Ashe is an American writer of horror and dark fiction. Her debut short story collection, We Are Here to Hurt Each Other (2022), won the Shirley Jackson Award for Single-Author Collection and was a finalist for the Bram Stoker Award.

== Background ==
Ashe is from Dayton, Ohio and moved to Fort Wayne in 2009.

Ashe describes her fiction as dark, transgressive, queer and inclusive horror. She also writes creative nonfiction, poetry and scholarly essays. She has cited the filmmaker Pascal Laugier and the writers Gemma Files, Elizabeth Massie and Zin E. Rocklyn among her influences. She has described herself as an obsessive fan of the Hellraiser franchise.

== Career ==
In 2022 her work We Are Here to Hurt Each Other won the Shirley Jackson Award for Best Single-Author Collection and was nominated for the Bram Stoker Award Best Fiction Collection.

Ashe has worked in education, including in the Office of Diversity and Multicultural Affairs at Purdue University Fort Wayne and has taught on the faculty of the Midwest Writers Workshop.

== Awards and honors ==
Year	Award	Work	Result
2022	Shirley Jackson Award, Best Single-Author Collection	We Are Here to Hurt Each Other	Won
2022	Bram Stoker Award, Best Fiction Collection	We Are Here to Hurt Each Other	Nominated

== Bibliography ==
=== Collection ===
- We Are Here to Hurt Each Other (2022), Nictitating Books

=== Short fiction in anthologies ===
- "Carry On, Carrion" in Eulogies III (2015), edited by Christopher Jones, Nanci Kalanta, Bracken MacLeod and Tony Tremblay
- "A Confession of Earwigs" in This World Belongs to Us: An Anthology of Horror Stories about Bugs (2023), edited by Michael W. Phillips Jr.
