= Rebecca Rowland =

American writer

- Occupations: Writer, editor
- Writing career
- Genres: Horror, dark fiction
- Notable works: White Trash & Recycled Nightmares (2023); American Cannibal (2023, editor); Eminence Front (2026)
- Notable awards: Godless 666 Award for Best Novelette (2023, Optic Nerve)
- Website: rowlandbooks.com

Rebecca Rowland is an American author of dark fiction and horror. She received the Godless 666 Gold Medal for Best Novelette and has been nominated for the Bram Stoker Award and Shirley Jackson Award.

== Background ==
Rowland has lived in New England most of her life and commonly uses this as a location in her fiction.

== Career ==
Rowland's speculative fiction, critical essays, and book reviews regularly appear in a variety of online and print venues.

In 2023 her novelette Optic Nerve was the winner of the Godless 666 Gold Medal for Best Novelette. Also in 2023 she was nominated for the Shirley Jackson Award for Best Single-Author Collection for White Trash & Recycled Nightmares she received her work American Cannibal received a nomination for the Bram Stoker Award for Best Anthology.

Rowland has previously worked as acquisitions and anthology editor at Dark Ink Books (an imprint of AM Ink Publishing) and currently co-owns and manages the small, independent publishing house Maenad Press.

Rowland is the co-founder of Literary Nasties, awards given annually to the best in transgressive and misfit fiction. The awards began in 2022 and are presented annually.

== Awards and honors ==
Year	Award	Work	Result
2023	Shirley Jackson Award, Best Single-Author Collection	White Trash & Recycled Nightmares	Nominated
2023	Bram Stoker Award, Best Anthology	American Cannibal	Nominated
2023	Winner of the Godless 666 Gold Medal for Best Novelette	Optic Nerve	Won

== Bibliography ==
=== Novel ===
- Eminence Front (2026), Clash Books

=== Novellas ===
- Pieces (2019), Dark Ink, with Michael Aloisi
- The View Master (2021), Marred Press, with Michael Aloisi
- Shagging the Boss (2022), Filthy Loot
- Optic Nerve (2022)

=== Collections ===
- The Horrors Hiding in Plain Sight (2018), Dark Ink
- White Trash & Recycled Nightmares (2023), Dead Sky Publishing
- Unsettled Score (20226), Lethe Press

=== As editor ===
- Ghosts, Goblins, Murder, & Madness: Twenty Tales of Halloween (2018), Dark Ink
- Shadowy Natures: Stories of Psychological Horror (2020), Dark Ink
- The Half That You See (2021), Dark Ink
- Unburied: A Collection of Queer Dark Fiction (2021), Dark Ink
- Generation X-ed (2022), Dark Ink
- Dancing in the Shadows: A Tribute to Anne Rice (2022), with Elaine Pascale
- Terror for Teetotalers (2022), with Kevin Bell
- American Cannibal (2023), Maenad Press

=== Selected short fiction ===
- "Better by You, Better than Me" in The Rack: Stories Inspired by Vintage Horror Paperbacks (2024), edited by Tom Deady
- "Pick Up Every Stitch" in Evil Little Fucks (2024), edited by Steven Pajak and R. E. Sargent
- "Grinding Meat" in Head Blown Too (2024)
