= Howard W. Blake High School =

Location
- 1701 North Boulevard; Tampa, Florida 33607; 27°57′30″N 82°28′01″W

Information
- Type: Public magnet high school
- Established: 1997
- School district: Hillsborough County Public Schools
- Principal: Toby Johnson
- Staff: 72.00 (FTE)
- Grades: 9–12
- Enrollment: 1,584 (2023-2024)
- Student to teacher ratio: 22.00
- Colors: Black and gold
- Team name: Yellow Jackets
- Website: www.hillsboroughschools.org/o/blake

Howard W. Blake High School is a public magnet high school, with an emphasis on the arts, in Tampa, Florida, United States. It is operated by the School District of Hillsborough County. Originally opened in 1956 as a school for African-Americans, it was integrated as a junior high school after the end of segregation. The current building opened in 1997, when Blake again became a high school.

== History ==
Don Thompson Vocational High School opened as a segregated school for African-Americans in 1956. It was soon renamed Howard W. Blake Comprehensive High School in honor of Howard Wesley Blake, an African-American educator and educational activist from Tampa.

The original Blake High School closed after the 1970–71 school year as Hillsborough County Public Schools desegregated. It reopened in the following year as Blake 7th Grade Center, an integrated school that only taught one grade level of students. In the early 1990s, the school housed students from 7th through 9th grade and was renamed Blake Junior High School, a middle school. This school closed in 1996, and the old building was demolished soon thereafter.

=== Magnet school ===
In the fall of 1997, the Blake name was transferred to Blake High School, a new high school housed in a new building opened as a magnet school for the visual, communication and performing arts.

The 2007–2008 school year marked Blake's 10th anniversary as a magnet school. Part of the celebration was organized by the school's Magnet Arts Coordinator. Her event for the anniversary featured Blake alumni from the previous ten years, and included gallery pieces and performances by artists such as Ari Richter and Chicago's star of Wicked, Dan'yelle Williamson.

The school performed the play Too Much Light Makes the Baby Go Blind and the choir and symphony orchestra performed the Requiem by Mozart.

== Academic standards ==
Blake Accelerated Curriculum Program is an online high school magnet program in the school district of Hillsborough County. It is one of seven franchises of Florida Virtual School. Students only report to campus for FCAT testing, and optional extracurricular activities. Students can customize their education to be accelerated or to just accommodate their needs. Some students accelerate their high school career and graduate one or two years early.

=== Graduation rate ===
In 2012 Blake's graduation rate was 80% as compared to a statewide rate of 74.5% and a Hillsborough County rate of 72.6%.

=== Florida Department of Education grade ===
- 2014 - B
- 2013 - B
- 2012 - B
- 2011 - B
- 2010 - A
- 2009 - D
- 2008 - D
- 2007 - D
- 2006 - C
- 2005 - C
- 2004 - D
- 2003 - C
- 2002 - C
- 2001 - C
- 2000 - C
- 1999 - C

== Magnet programs ==
=== Theater ===
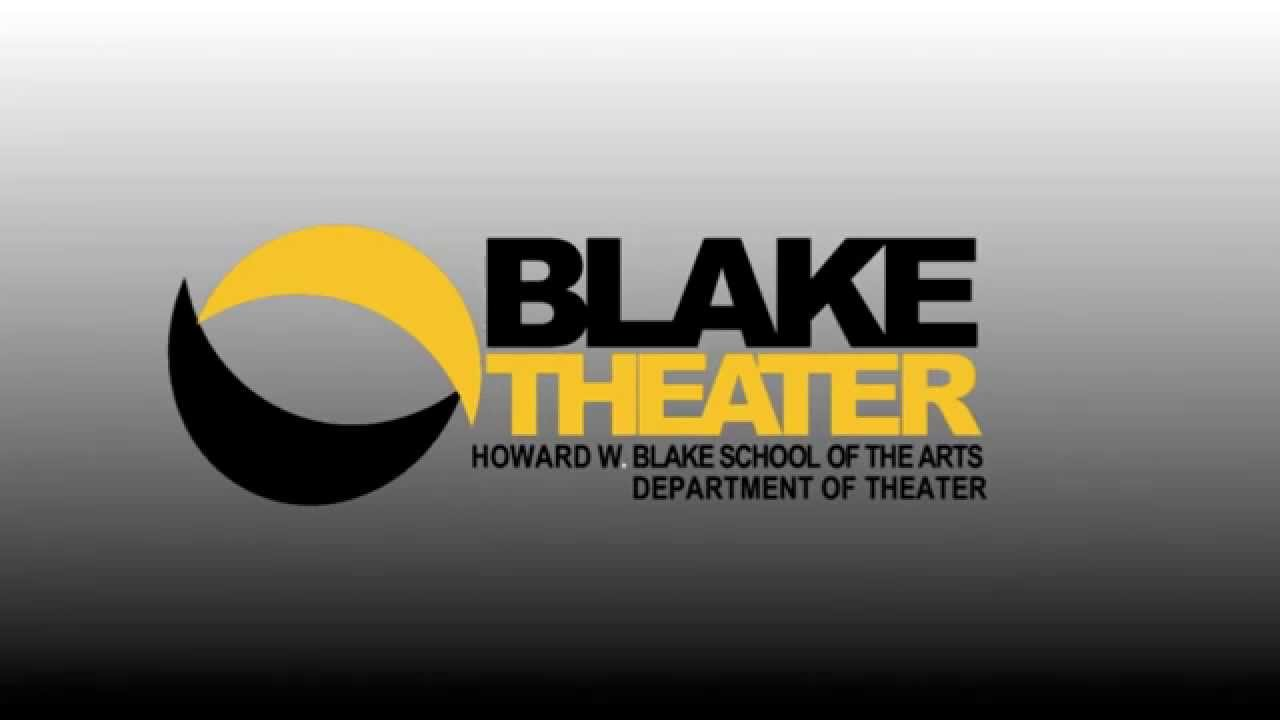
Logo of the Theater Department

The theater program provides for the study of drama, musical theater and technical theater/design. The theater department is part of the International Thespian Society and competes annually at Florida State Thespians, where they have won Superior ratings in virtually all categories. The theater department produces seven shows a year: two plays, two musicals, a musical concert, a one-act play, and a Senior Showcase.

Many students of the theater department have continued into university or community theater. Several have appeared professionally on stage or screen, such as:

- Shannon Magrane, singer
- Taylor Trensch, actor
- Owen Teague, actor

During their high school careers, Blake students have worked as actors, directors, playwrights, stage managers, designers, and technicians. Some have worked at local theaters in the Tampa Bay area, including the American Stage Theatre, FreeFall Theatre, Stageworks, and Jobsite.

=== Television and film ===
TV/Film students are selected by an audition process. The award-winning TV and Film Production program prepares students for careers in the broadcast and film industries. From scriptwriting to video editing, students will develop skills necessary to become a broadcast journalist and/ or filmmaker. Whether it's participating in student short film contests, covering live events as a reporter, or hosting a radio podcast, the choices are endless as a crew member of the WBUZ team.

== Notable alumni ==
- Ryan Davis, former NFL player
- Earl Edwards, former NFL player
- Jaylah Hickmon, known professionally as Doechii, Grammy Award-winning singer and rapper
- Eddie McMillan, former NFL player
- Leon McQuay, former NFL player
- Myki Meeks, Rupaul's Drag Race
- Isaiah Rodgers, NFL player
- JD Scott, writer
- Emanuel Sharp (born 2004), Israeli-American basketball player
- Owen Teague, actor
- Taylor Trensch, actor

== Notable faculty ==
- Derrick Sharp, basketball coach
