= Brooke Warra =

- Other name: Brookelynne Warra
- Occupations: Writer, editor
- Writing career
- Genres: Weird, Horror
- Notable work: Luminous Body (2019)
- Notable awards: Shirley Jackson Award (2019)
- Website: brookewarra.com

Brooke Warra (also known as Brookelynne Warra) is an American writer of horror and weird fiction. Her chapbook Luminous Body (2019) won the Shirley Jackson Award for Best Novelette. Her short fiction has appeared in anthologies including Looming Low and Horror for RAICES, in horror magazines, and on horror podcasts.

== Early life ==
Warra grew up in a Finnish-American community in the Pacific Northwest, which has provided inspiration for her work.

== Career ==
Warra's work has appeared in horror magazines, including Sanitarium and Under the Bed, and she wrote episodes for the horror fiction podcasts The Wicked Library and Victoria's Lift.

Her story "Heirloom" appeared in Looming Low: Volume I which debuted at NecronomiCon in Providence, Rhode Island. The anthology was a finalist for the 2017 Shirley Jackson Award for Edited Anthology. Her story "Cherub" was published in Strange Aeons in 2017 and reprinted in 2019 in Yearning to Breathe Free, a charity anthology benefiting RAICES; the same year she contributed a story to Nightscape Press's Horror for RAICES.

In October 2019, Dim Shores published her chapbook Luminous Body, a novelette illustrated by her daughter, Zoe Leigh. It won the 2019 Shirley Jackson Award for Best Novelette.

Warra was one of the editors of the relaunched Sanitarium Magazine in 2019.

== Themes ==
Warra's fiction combines weird fiction with body horror and domestic subject matter. Her publisher, Dim Shores, described Luminous Body as exploring pregnancy, motherhood and family through a cosmic body horror lens. In a 2019 interview on the podcast The Outer Dark, she discussed the book's focus on layered relationships among generations of women, grief, and her interest in moving beyond familiar tropes for women characters in horror.
