= R. A. Busby =

American horror writer

- Occupation: Writer
- Writing career
- Genres: Horror, body horror
- Notable works: "Not the Man I Married" (2020) "Ten Thousand Crawling Children" (2024); You Will Speak for the Dead (2024)
- Notable awards: Shirley Jackson Award for Best Short Fiction (2020)
- Website: rabusbybooks.weebly.com

R.A. Busby is an American horror author. She has won a Shirley Jackson Award and has been nominated for a Bram Stoker Award.

== Career ==
Busby has cited Shirley Jackson, Angela Carter, John Langan Amparo Dávila, and Toni Morrison among her influences. Among her earliest experiences of horror in fiction were dark fairy tales, particularly those of Hans Christian Andersen.

Busby has said she is drawn to internal, psychological horror rather than splatterpunk. Her work frequently uses body horror to explore themes of pregnancy, bodily autonomy, memory and human connection.

=== Short fiction ===
Busby’s short fiction has been featured Good Southern Witches, Novus Monstrum, Bleak Midwinter: The Darkest Night, Don’t Break The Oath: Women Of Horror Anthology Volume 4, PseudoPod, Creepy Podcast, and What Remains: An Inked in Gray Anthology.

Her story "Not the Man I Married", published in Black Petals Issue 93 (Autumn 2020), won the 2020 Shirley Jackson Award for Short Fiction. Another of her stories, "Holes", from Kandisha Press's Graveyard Smash: Women of Horror Anthology Vol. 2, was a finalist in the same category that year.

=== Novellas ===
Busby's first novella Corporate Body, published as part of Cemetery Gates Media’s My Dark Library series, follows a college dropout who becomes a test subject for a pharmaceutical company. Words Made of Flesh is her second novella set in New Bedford, Massachusetts, in 1899, follows a tormented man who becomes obsessed with a story about a living book made of human flesh. Her third novella, You Will Speak For The Dead, follows Paul Simard, a hoarder-house cleaner who, while clearing out the fungus-covered home of an elderly biologist, discovers that something living in the house is speaking to him. Zoje Stage said that the story was "poignant, with just the right touches of humor and ick." Foreword Reviews’ Ian Dailey found the novella more concerned with memory and connection than horror, though he considered its fourth-wall breaks distracting.

Her story “Ten Thousand Crawling Children”, published in Nightmare magazine, was nominated for the 2024 Bram Stoker Award for Superior Achievement in Short Fiction. The story was written shortly after the overturning of Roe v. Wade and explores pregnancy as a type of invasion of the body and the loss of bodily autonomy.

=== Adaptations and translations ===
“Ten Thousand Crawling Children” was narrated by Justine Eyre for ‘’Nightmare’’'s podcast, and her stories have also been featured on the horror fiction podcasts ‘’PseudoPod’’ and ‘’Creepy’’.

== Awards and honors ==
Year	Award	Work	Result
2024	Bram Stoker Award, Short Fiction	"Ten Thousand Crawling Children"	Nominated
2020	Shirley Jackson Award, Best Short Fiction	"Not the Man I Married"	Won
2020	Shirley Jackson Award, Best Short Fiction	"Holes"	Nominated

== Bibliography ==
=== Novellas ===
- Corporate Body (2023), Cemetery Gates Media
- Words Made of Flesh (2024), Cemetery Gates Media
- You Will Speak of the Dead (2024), Stelliform Press

=== Short fiction ===
- "Bits" (2019), Short Sharp Shocks! Book 43, Demain Publishing
- "Holes" (2020), in Graveyard Smash: Women of Horror Anthology Vol. 2. Kandisha Press
- "Not the Man I Married" (2020), Black Petals, Issue 93, Autumn 2020
- "Street View" (2020), Collective Realms, Issue 2, Lazy Adventurer Publishing
- "Kiss" (2021), Women of Horror Anthology Vol. 3: The One That Got Away (Kandisha Press)
- "Cold" (2021), What Remains: An Inked in Gray Anthology, Inked in Gray
- "Baby" (2021), Good Southern Witches, Good Southern Witches
- "Fluid" (2021), Women of Horror Anthology Vol. 4, Kandisha Press
- "Ill Wind" (2021), Anomalies & Curiosities: An Anthology of Gothic Medical Horror, Quill & Crow Publishing House
- "The Memory Hold" (2022), Abyss: Stories of Depth, Time and Infinity, Orchid's Lantern
- "All Her Little Bones" (2022), Bleak Midwinter: The Darkest Night (Quill & Crow Publishing House)
- "Catfish" (2023), Novus Monstrum, Publishdrive
- "Only the Stones Will Hear You Scream" (2023), Horror Library, Volume 8, Dark Moon Books
- “Ten Thousand Crawling Children” (2024), Nightmare, Issue 136, January 2024
