= The Art of Starving =

2017 novel by Sam J. Miller

- First edition
- Author: Sam J. Miller
- Cover artist: Matt Blease (art); Jenna Stempel (design)
- Language: English
- Subject: mental health • queer • eating disorder • love • bullying
- Genre: science fiction • young adult • fantasy • lgbt
- Publisher: HarperCollins
- Publication date: July 11, 2017
- Publication place: United States
- Pages: 384
- Awards: Andre Norton Award (2017)
- ISBN: 978-0062456717
- OCLC: 961008184

The Art of Starving is a 2017 young adult science fiction novel by Sam J. Miller. It was published by HarperCollins.

== Synopsis ==
Matt, a teenager, practices “The Art of Starving”: by eating as little food as possible, he believes that he will reach enlightenment. He seeks to uncover the mystery of his sister Maya's recent disappearance. His mother believes that she had just ran away, but Matt believes something nefarious happened to her. He gets closer to classmate Tariq, the last person Maya saw before she disappeared, as he believes that he or his friends was responsible. Complicating matters is Matt's attraction for him — another hunger he tries to repress.

Matt discovers he has extra-heightened senses as a result of his fasting, as when he is forced to eat, his senses become dull again. He senses that Tariq has a big secret. He tries to pressure him into admitting what he did to Maya, but he admits that his big secret is that he is gay and has had a crush on Matt for a while. Matt reciprocates his feelings and they agree to keep their relationship secret, as Tariq's parents are homophobic. Tariq tells Matt that Maya asked him to drive her so she could meet her father.

Matt is devastated knowing that Maya abandoned them. His self-image issues and need for control intensifies, and as he eats less, his powers grow. He visits Tariq's family for dinner and indulges himself in eating his favorite food, but he feels guilty afterward and vomits it out. Tariq catches him in the act so Matt tells him about his anorexia. They break up after an argument when Matt refuses to confront his eating disorder and Tariq refuses to come out.

Upon learning that his mother was fired from her job at the slaughterhouse, Matt, in a semi-addled state, uses his powers to release all the pigs and orders them to rampage the town. He tries to lead them to his father's location so they would kill him, but he loses energy and is stopped by Maya, who hears his call.

Matt ends up in a rehabilitation center for his eating disorder. Maya reveals that their mother was in an abusive relationship with their father, and that Maya wanted to visit him. When she met him she freaked out and attacked him with a hot coffee pot, and her disappearance was because she was afraid of getting caught. Matt, Maya, and their mother all reconcile, with his mother revealing that she has a new job of repairing the town from the rampage. Matt and Tariq decide to stay as friends.

Matt has recovered from his anorexia. He finds a stray pig in the woods and realizes he still possesses powers to communicate with it, even without starving himself. He has his epiphany: he may have first gotten his powers through hate, but it came back stronger through love.

== Reception ==
The Art of Starving won the 2017 Andre Norton Award and was a finalist for the 2018 Lodestar Award for Best Young Adult Book. It was a finalist for the 2018 Crawford Award and the 2018 Locus Award for Best First Novel.

Kirkus Reviews called it a "dark and lovely tale of supernatural vengeance and self-destruction", and described Matt's superpowers as "trippy". Publishers Weekly lauded Miller for being "brutally honest" in describing the long-term physical effects of anorexia. Both publications gave the novel starred reviews.

Em Nordling at Tor.com noted that, when compared to other works about eating disorders, it was "too tongue-in-cheek and bizarre" to be a standard morality tale. "Instead, Miller has written a bruising and incisive story about a boy at war with himself—with his hunger, with his lust, with the things that tie him to the world... The Art of Starving is a rule book where its rules self-destruct, slowly but surely, in tandem with its narrator."
