= Karen Heuler =

American writer

- Born: New York City, U.S.
- Education: Long Island University
- Occupations: Novelist; short story writer; educator
- Writing career
- Period: 1985–present
- Genres: Literary fiction, science fiction, dark fantasy
- Notable work: The Inner City
- Notable awards: 2010 Literary Prize in Fiction, American Literary Review
- Website: www.karenheuler.com

Karen Heuler is an American writer of literary, dark fantasy, science fiction, and horror short stories, and novels.

== Early life and education ==
Karen Heuler was born in Brooklyn, New York and attended Long Island University, where she received her master's degree in English in 1976.

== Career ==
Heuler has worked in various jobs including publishing, crosswords, art books, Wall Street, and retail.

She teaches occasionally for New York University School of Professional Studies, and other academic institutions.

She has had over 100 stories published in literary and speculative journals and anthologies, as well as four novels, three collections, and one novella. Her work focuses on the perception of reality and often features doubles and doppelgangers from both a literary and speculative point of view. She frequently uses literary works as a reference point for speculative stories, as an indicator of the continuity of topics across genres.

== Awards and honorable mentions ==
- Winner, 2010 Literary Prize in Fiction, American Literary Review
- 1998 O. Henry Award
- Finalist, The Shirley Jackson Award, 2009 & 2017
- Finalist, Bellwether Prize for Fiction, 2004
- Second place, Night Train Magazine's 50/50 awards, 2003
- Finalist, 1993 Iowa Short Fiction Awards
- Semifinalist, 1992 Nelson Algren Award

== Work ==
=== Books ===
- In Search of Lost Time, Aqueduct Press, 2017
- Other Places, Aqueduct Press, Oct. 2016
- Glorious Plague, Permuted Press, April 2014
- The Inner City, ChiZine Publications, Canada, 2013
- The Made-up Man, Livingston Press, Livingston, Alabama, May 2011
- Journey to Bom Goody, Livingston Press, Livingston, Alabama, May 2005
- The Soft Room, Livingston Press, Livingston, Alabama, May 2004
- The Other Door, University of Missouri Press, Columbia, Missouri, October 1995

=== Anthologies ===
- Tiny Crimes, Black Balloon Publishing, 2019
- Killing It Softly 2, Digital Fiction Publishing, Fall 2017
- Invaders, Tachyon Publications, 2016
- Dreams from the Witch House, Dark Regions Press, 2016
- The Bestiary, Cheeky Frawg Books, 2016
- Mosaics, DayDreams Dandelions Press, 2016
- Black Apples, Belladonna Publishing, 2014
- Not Just Rockets and Robots: Daily Science Fiction Year One, 2012
- Year’s Best SF 17, Harper Voyager, 2012
- Realms 2: the Second Year of Clarkesworld, Prime Books, 2010
- Best of the Web, Dzanc Books, 2009
- The Year’s Best Science Fiction and Fantasy, Prime Books, 2009
- Phantom, Prime Books, 2009
- Bandersnatch, Prime Books, 2007
- ParaSpheres, Omnidawn Publishing, 2006
- Snakes: An Anthology, M. Evans and Co, 2003
- Prize Stories The Best of 1998: The O. Henry Awards, Anchor Books, 1998
