= Chavisa Woods =

American poet

Chavisa Woods is a New York City-based author, and winner of the Shirley Jackson Award.

== Background ==
Woods was born and raised in a rural farm town, Sandoval Illinois, and lived from 2000 to 2003 in St. Louis, Missouri, where she was a resident of the anarchist collective C.A.M.P. (Community Arts and Media Project). She moved in 2003 to New York City, where she resided and worked for A Gathering of the Tribes, art gallery-salon and small press, owned and operated by novelist and professor Steve Cannon. She now serves as the Executive Director of A Gathering of the Tribes, and the Editor in Chief of Tribes Magazine Online, tribes.org. She has written four full-length books, including a novel and two fiction collections. She is best known for illustrating the lives of those in the conservative, rural areas of the U.S.

== Work ==
Chavisa Woods is a MacDowell Fellow and the author of four books: "100 Times (A Memoir of Sexism)" (Seven Stories Press, 2019), "Things To Do When You're Goth in the Country" (Seven Stories Press,2017), The Albino Album (Seven Stories Press,2013), and "Love Does Not Make Me Gentle or Kind (Fly by Night Press, 2009)."

Woods primarily writes literary fiction. Her work has received praise from The New York Times, Publishers Weekly, The Seattle Review of Books and many other media outlets.

Woods has presented lectures and conducted and workshops on short fiction and poetry at a number of academic institutions, including: New York University (NYU), Mount Holyoke College, Penn State, Sarah Lawrence College, Bard College, Brooklyn College, Brooklyn Tech, Hugo and the New School. She currently leads select writing workshops throughout the year through Hugo House and Catapult.

== Awards ==
Woods received the Shirley Jackson Award in 2018, for a story in her collection, Things To Do When You're Goth in the Country.

Woods was the recipient of the Kathy Acker Award in writing in 2018.

Woods was awarded the Cobalt Fiction Prize in 2013 for her short work of poetic prose entitled "Things to do when you're Goth in the Country".

Woods was the 2008 recipient of the Jerome Foundation Travel Grant for Emerging Authors.

Love Does Not Make Me Gentle or Kind was a finalist for the 21st Lambda Literary Award for Debut Fiction.

== Other publications ==
Woods has published prose and poetry in a number of magazines, including:

- Lit Hub
- Electric Lit
- Tin House Magazine
- Sensitive Skin 2017
- Cleaver Magazine 2013
- Adanna 2013
- Union Station Magazine 2011
- The Evergreen Review 2011
- Danse Macabre- Stonewall Issue, 2009
- Poetz.com Green Issue, 2008
- Blue Fog Journal, 2007
- Cake Poetry, 2007
- Tribes Magazine, 2007
- The Red Doll (chapbook) – 2006
- Matador, 2006
- The BARD Gay and Lesbian Poetry Review, 2006
- Chronogram, 2006
- Conversations with the Other Woman (chapbook), 2006
- Where We Live, 2005,
- Calling the Red, Chapbook, 2005
- Xanadou, 2004
- Wildflowers, 2004
- In The Fray, 2004

=== Fiction ===
- Things to Do When You're Goth in the Country, Short Fiction Collection, Seven Stories Press, 2017
- "Zombie," Tin House, 2017
- "What's Happening on the News?" Short Fiction Quaint Magazine, 2016
- The Albino Album (Seven Stories Press, 2013)
- How to Stop Smoking.... Usama Sensitive Skin Magazine 2012
- "A New Mowhawk" Jadalliya 2012
- Love Does Not Make Me Gentle or Kind, Fly By Night Press, 2008
- "The Smallest Actions", The Fiction Circus, 2008
- "The Bell Tower", Prima Materia, 2006
- Short story in Fuzion 1003, 2004

=== Nonfiction ===
- An Economy of Tigers, Full Stop Magazine, 2020
- "Hating Valerie Solanas (And Loving Violent Men," Full Stop Magazine, 2019
- The Memoir I Never Wanted to Write, Lit Hub 2018
- 100 Times: A Memoir of Sexism, 2019
- Ten Books for Country Goths, Electric Lit, 2017
- Gentlemen, Close Your Legs, The Brooklyn Rail, 2012

=== Documentaries ===
- Rhapsodists, 2004

== Book reviews ==
- The New York Times, 2019
- Publishers Weekly
- Booklist
- Pedestal Magazine
- The Brooklyn Rail
- The Short Review
- GO! Mag
