= The Albino Album =

2013 novel by Chavisa Woods

- First edition
- Author: Chavisa Woods
- Language: English
- Publisher: Seven Stories Press
- Publication date: 19 March 2013
- Publication place: USA
- Pages: 560
- ISBN: 978-1-60980-476-3

The Albino Album is a 2013 novel by the American writer Chavisa Woods published by Seven Stories Press. Termed "a queer epic" by the publisher and author, it is a picaresque coming-of-age novel following the adolescence of a young girl in the rural United States.

== Background ==
Woods wrote the novel over the course of five years, drawing on her own experiences to form the plot and setting. She wrote it more removed from her own life, however, keeping the book "a bit lighter," and focusing on the characters and plot rather than poetry and language like she had in her previous book, Love Does Not Make Me Gentle Or Kind. It was her first work written as a page-turner for the popular audience.

== Reception ==
The book received mixed reviews, many acclaiming the character created in its protagonist Mya but some criticizing the rest of the plot; Publishers Weekly′s review called Mya's character "sympathetic," it took issue with the "loose ends and an unsatisfying conclusion." Other reviewers were less critical, rather calling it "sprawling," "the kind of book that requires lists to even begin to capture," (Lambda Literary and Velvet Park Media, respectively). These other reviewers shared Publishers Weekly′s appreciation of Mya's character, Lambda calling her "impossible not to fall in love with."
