= The Resurrection Man's Legacy =

2003 collection of short stories by Dale Bailey

- Cover of first edition
- Author: Dale Bailey
- Cover artist: John Picacio
- Language: English
- Genre: Horror, dark fantasy
- Publisher: Golden Gryphon Press
- Publication date: 2003
- Publication place: United States
- Media type: print (hardcover)
- Pages: xii, 290
- ISBN: 9781930846227
- OCLC: 52127540

The Resurrection Man's Legacy is a collection of horror and dark fantasy short stories by American writer Dale Bailey. It was first published by Golden Gryphon Press in hardcover in November 2003. An ebook edition was released by Open Road Integrated Media in July 2014 under the alternate title The Resurrection Man's Legacy and Other Stories.

== Summary ==
The book collects eleven short works of fiction by the author, together with an introduction by Barry N. Malzberg and story notes.

== Contents ==
- "Dale Bailey: In His Dominion" (Barry N. Malzberg)
- "The Resurrection Man's Legacy" (from The Magazine of Fantasy & Science Fiction, July 1995)
- "Death and Suffrage" (from The Magazine of Fantasy & Science Fiction, Feb. 2002)
- "The Anencephalic Fields" (from The Magazine of Fantasy & Science Fiction, Jan. 2000)
- "Home Burial" (from The Magazine of Fantasy & Science Fiction, Dec. 1994)
- "Quinn's Way" (from The Magazine of Fantasy & Science Fiction, Feb. 1997)
- "Touched" (from The Magazine of Fantasy & Science Fiction, Oct./Nov. 1993)
- "The Census Taker" (from The Magazine of Fantasy & Science Fiction, Oct./Nov. 2003)
- "Exodus" (from The Magazine of Fantasy & Science Fiction, July 1997)
- "Cockroach" (from The Magazine of Fantasy & Science Fiction, Dec. 1998)
- "Sheep's Clothing" (from The Magazine of Fantasy & Science Fiction, Oct./Nov. 1995)
- "In Green's Dominion" (from Sci Fiction, June 5, 2002)
- "Story Notes"

== Awards ==
The collection placed nineteenth in the 2004 Locus Poll Award for Best Collection.

"The Resurrection Man's Legacy" was nominated for the 1996 Nebula Award for Best Novelette.

"Death and Suffrage" won the 2002 International Horror Guild Award for Best Intermediate Form.

"Quinn's Way" placed twenty-second in the 1998 Locus Poll Award for Best Novelette.

"The Census Taker" was nominated for the 2003 International Horror Guild Award for Best Intermediate Form and placed eighteenth in the 2004 Locus Poll Award for Best Novelette.
