= 57 Reasons for the Slate Quarry Suicides =

2013 short story by Sam J. Miller

"57 Reasons for the Slate Quarry Suicides" is a 2013 horror-tragedy short story by Sam J. Miller. It was first published in Nightmare.

== Synopsis ==
Jared is a teenage boy who lists the reasons why he mind-controlled a group of bullies into committing mass suicide.

After discovering that he has the ability to make other living creatures mimic his own actions, Jared revealed his power to his best friend, Anchal. They were inspired to take revenge against Jared's six swim team mates, who frequently harass Jared for being gay, by luring them to the local slate quarries and killing them.

== Reception ==
"57 Reasons for the Slate Quarry Suicides" won the 2013 Shirley Jackson Award.

Tangent Online praised the story, and considered it to be "steeped in unmet yearnings and thwarted rage".

== Background ==
Miller has stated that the story is "about how privilege warps people’s relationships, and can turn people into monsters", and emphasized that "(t)he real reason for [Jared's actions] isn't one of the 57 that Jared lists."
