= Gabriela Damián Miravete =

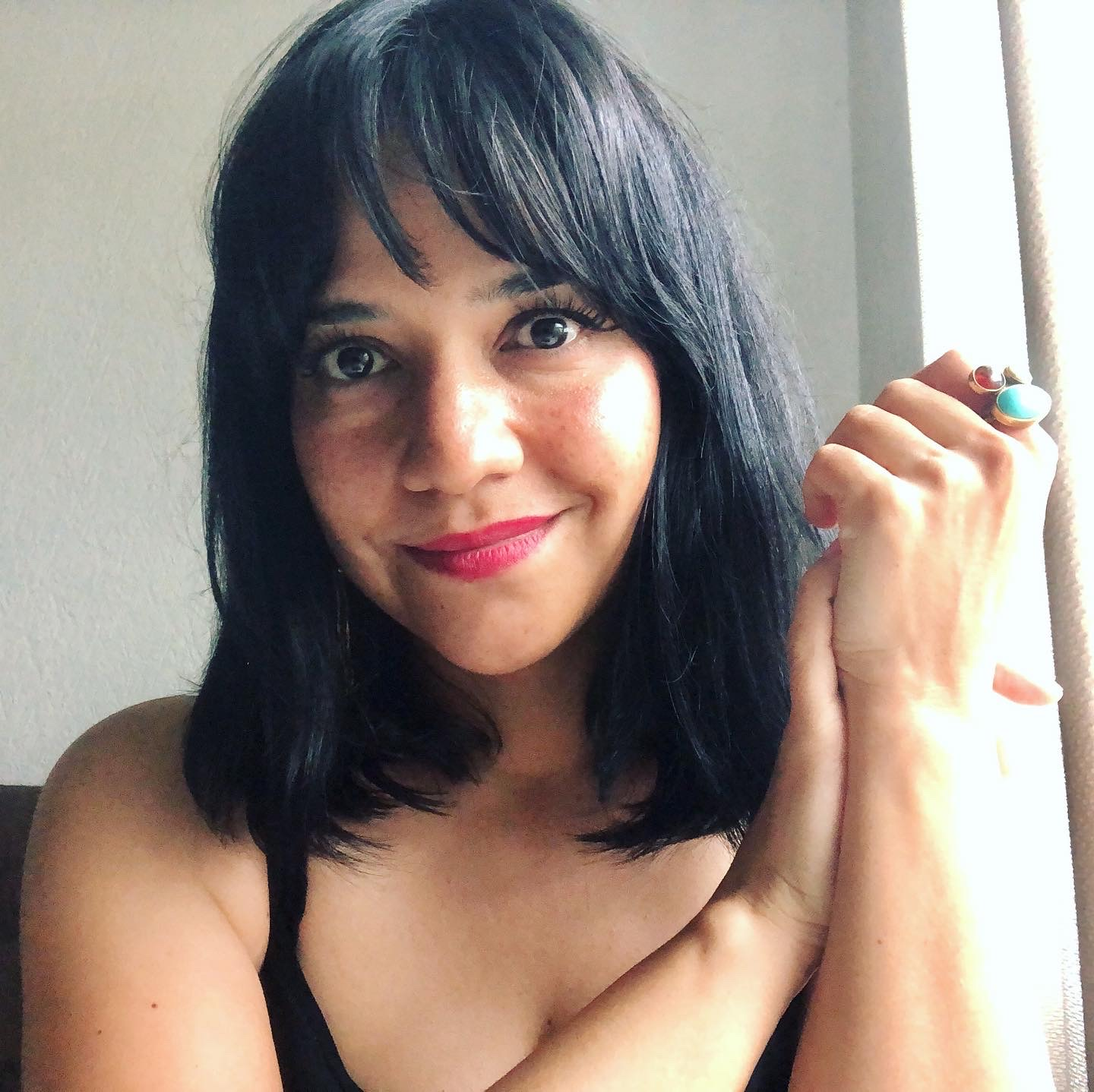
- Born: 1979 (age 46–47); Mexico City, Mexico
- Education: Autonomous University of Barcelona
- Awards: Otherwise Award; Shirley Jackson Award for Best Collection

Gabriela Damián Miravete is a Mexican writer. Her book, They will Dream, won the Otherwise Award and the Shirley Jackson Award for Best Collection.

== Biography ==
Damián Miravete was born in Mexico City in 1979. She graduated from the Autonomous University of Barcelona—with a degree in communication and creative writing—and the SOGEM Writers' School.

Damián Miravete won the Mexico City Children's and Youth Book Fair Short Story Prize in 2007 for her children's book, La Tradición de Judas. She won the Young Creators grant in short story category from the National Fund for Culture and the Arts in 2009-2010, which she used to write Little Opal Cards—later renamed The Song Behind All Things. Her book, They Will Dream—a volume of 12 stories—won the 2018 Otherwise Award. In 2023, They Will Dream won the Shirley Jackson Award for Best Collection.
