= Things to Do When You're Goth in the Country =

2017 collection of stories by Chavisa Woods

Things to Do When You're Goth in the Country & Other Stories
- Author: Chavisa Woods
- Language: English
- Publisher: Seven Stories Press
- Publication date: 16 May 2017
- Publication place: USA
- Pages: 224
- ISBN: 978-1-60980-745-0

Things to Do When You're Goth in the Country & Other Stories is a 2017 collection of short stories by the American writer Chavisa Woods published by Seven Stories Press. Its stories focus on the lives of rural Americans, especially how their lives are affected by gender, class, and sexuality. Author Samantha Hunt described the book as "it's Murakami meets meth heads", in reference to one of the stories, in which the narrator returns home to find her family struggling with local meth dealers.

== Background ==
Woods has previously published a collection of short stories and a novel as well as several poems and short stories in various journals (including the title story in 2013).

== Reception ==
A work from this book Take the Way Home That Leads Back to Sullivan Street won Woods the Shirley Jackson Award for best novelette, 2018. This collection also received mention from film and television actress Emma Roberts (American Horror Story, Scream Queens), who posed with it in a series of photos, as part of her book club, Belletrist.

This has spurred a trend of people posing with the book while dressed in gothic fashion, in rural and pastoral settings and posting pictures on social media, often using the tag #thingstodowhenyouregothinthecounty. (example here: https://www.instagram.com/explore/tags/thingstodowhenyouregothinthecountry/ )

The title story was awarded the Cobalt Writing Prize for Fiction prior to the book's its publication.

The book received rave reviews in Booklist, The Rumpus, Full Stop Magazine, Electric Lit, Lit Hub, and many others, and received positive review in Publishers Weekly.

Many of the stories center on queer characters and particularly focus on issues of class, gender, and sexuality, which The Rumpus reviewer Erin Wilcox said might seem to be at the expense of analyzing racial issues, but Wilcox also noted that many of the stories deal with race in the gothic tradition as it has been explored by critics such as Toni Morrison in her 1992 book Playing in the Dark: Whiteness and the Literary Imagination. Despite their attention to these issues, the "ambivalence" of Woods's writing prevents the stories from being reduced to "rhetoric", as another reviewer noted, they are never "only" about queerness, but rather center on characters for whom that is a part of their identity.

Corinne Manning of Electric Lit considered the political nature of the collection, saying that the stories seemed "like they were ready made for a post 2017 election", but are in reality of "the world that's always been here".
