= JD Scott =

American poet and writer

- Occupations: Poet, writer
- Writing career
- Language: English
- Genres: Poetry, short fiction
- Notable works: Moonflower, Nightshade, All the Hours of the Day (2020); Mask for Mask (2021)
- Notable awards: Shirley Jackson Award nominee (Single-Author Collection, 2020)
- Website: jdscott.com

JD Scott is an American poet and writer based in Brooklyn, New York, and Tampa, Florida. Scott won the 2018 Madeleine P. Plonsker Emerging Writers Residency Prize at Lake Forest College, which supported completion of the story collection Moonflower, Nightshade, All the Hours of the Day (2020).

Moonflower, Nightshade, All the Hours of the Day received a starred review from Foreword Reviews and was a Foreword INDIES finalist in Short Stories (Adult Fiction). The collection was also a nominee for the 2020 Shirley Jackson Awards in the Single-Author Collection category.

Scott's debut full-length poetry collection, Mask for Mask (New Rivers Press, 2021), was reviewed by Publishers Weekly.

Scott's work has appeared in anthologies including BAX 2015: Best American Experimental Writing and Best New Poets 2017.

== Personal life ==
Scott uses they/them pronouns.

== Works ==
- Moonflower, Nightshade, All the Hours of the Day (Lake Forest College Press/&NOW Books, 2020)
- Mask for Mask (New Rivers Press, 2021)
