= The End of the End of Everything: Stories =

2015 collection of short stories by Dale Bailey

- Cover of first edition
- Author: Dale Bailey
- Cover artist: Galen Dara
- Language: English
- Genre: Horror, dark fantasy
- Publisher: Arche Press
- Publication date: 2015
- Publication place: United States
- Media type: print (paperback), ebook
- Pages: 227
- ISBN: 978-1-63023-007-4
- OCLC: 886485017

The End of the End of Everything: Stories is a collection of horror and dark fantasy short stories by American writer Dale Bailey. It was first published by Arche Press in paperback and ebook in April 2015.

== Summary ==
The book collects nine short works of fiction by the author.

== Contents ==
- "The End of the World as We Know It" (from The Magazine of Fantasy & Science Fiction, Oct./Nov. 2004)
- "The Bluehole" (from The Magazine of Fantasy & Science Fiction, May/June 2013)
- "The Creature Recants" (from Clarkesworld Magazine #85, Oct. 2013)
- "Mating Habits of the Late Cretaceous" (from Asimov's Science Fiction, Sep. 2012)
- "A Rumor of Angels" (from Tor.com, Sep. 11, 2013)
- "Eating at the End-of-the-World Café" (from The Magazine of Fantasy & Science Fiction, Sep. 2010)
- "Lightning Jack's Last Ride" (from The Magazine of Fantasy & Science Fiction, Jan. 2015)
- "Troop 9" (from Asimov's Science Fiction, Oct./Nov. 2014)
- "The End of the End of Everything" (from Tor.com, Apr. 23, 2014)

== Reception ==
The collection was reviewed by Paul Di Filippo in Locus Online in 2015, and James Sallis in The Magazine of Fantasy & Science Fiction, Jan./Feb. 2016.

== Awards ==
The collection was nominated for the 2016 Shirley Jackson Award for Best Collection, and placed 23rd in the 2016 Locus Poll Award for Best Collection.

"The End of the World as We Know It" was nominated for the 2004 International Horror Guild Award for Best Short Form and the 2006 Nebula Award for Best Short Story.

"Eating at the End-of-the-World Café" placed twelfth in the 2011 Locus Poll Award for Best Novelette.

"Mating Habits of the Late Cretaceous" placed fourth in the 2013 Asimov's Readers' Poll for Best Novelette, and twenty-fifth in the 2013 Locus Poll Award for Best Novelette.

"The Bluehole" was nominated for the 2013 Bram Stoker Award for Superior Achievement in Long Fiction.

"The End of the End of Everything" won the 2015 Shirley Jackson Award for Best Novelette, and placed 30th in the 2015 Locus Poll Award for Best Novelette.
