= Simon Strantzas =

Canadian writer (born 1972)

- Born: 1972 (age 53–54); Toronto, Canada
- Occupations: Writer, editor
- Writing career
- Genres: Weird; Horror
- Website: strantzas.com

Simon Strantzas (born 1972) is a weird fiction author from Toronto, Canada. He has written five story collections and been nominated for a British Fantasy Award in 2009. He has also edited three anthologies including Aickman's Heirs which won two Shirley Jackson Awards in 2015, one for best Edited Anthology and one for the included story “The Dying Season” by Lynda E. Rucker. His work was also cited as an influence for Nic Pizzolatto, creator of True Detective.

In March 2015, Simon Strantzas was selected as co-editor of The Year's Best Weird Fiction, Volume 3 (2016).

== Burnt Black Suns ==
In May 2014, Simon Strantzas released his fourth weird fiction collection from Hippocampus Press. It contained nine stories with two novellas and seven short stories. S. T. Joshi called it "one of the best weird collections [he’s] ever read—at least in the last 20 years and maybe longer than that." In May 2015, Burnt Black Suns was nominated for the 2014 Shirley Jackson Award for Single-Author Collection.

== Aickman's Heirs ==
In May 2015, Undertow Publications released Aickman's Heirs, an anthology edited by Simon Strantzas. The short fiction stories in the anthology were written by some of the leading voices in strange fiction, including Brian Evenson and Lisa Tuttle, as a showcase of how Robert Aickman's work continues to inspire contemporary authors. The anthology was nominated for the British Fantasy Award and the World Fantasy Award. It was also the winner of the Shirley Jackson Award, as was Lynda E. Rucker's "The Dying Season". Rucker's story and Nadia Bulkin's also-nominated "Seven Minutes in Heaven" were both stories from the book.

== Bibliography ==
=== Collections ===
- Beneath the Surface (Humdrumming, 2008)
- Cold to the Touch (Tartarus Press, 2009)
- Nightingale Songs (Dark Regions Press, 2011)
- Burnt Black Suns (Hippocampus Press, 2014)
- Nothing is Everything (Undertow Publications, 2018)
- Only the Living are Lost (Hippocampus Press, 2023)
- Other Sides (Lethe Press, 2025)

=== Anthologies edited ===
- Shadows Edge (Gray Friar Press, 2013)
- Aickman's Heirs (Undertow Publications, 2015)
- Year's Best Weird Fiction, Volume 3 (Undertow Publications, 2016)
