= The Fiction Circus =

American magazine

The Fiction Circus was an online literary magazine and art collective, based in Brooklyn, New York, and Austin, Texas, that published short fiction and essays on the arts. It existed between 2008 and 2014. The group also held staged multimedia fiction readings accompanied by electronic music and incorporating visual art and theater as a frame narrative. The writers of the site operated under names such as Miracle Jones, Stephen Future, Geoff Sebesta, Goodman Carter, and Xerxes Verdammt, and the main magazine content included writing about classical and contemporary literature, including fiction in non-traditional media.

The Fiction Circus has been featured in Slashdot, The New York Times and Wired, among other online news sources. They have performed throughout New York City and Austin, Texas, including The KGB Bar and the Yippie Museum & Café.

Fiction Circus live shows have been reviewed in The Huffington Post and in The New York Observer.
