= Nadia Bulkin =

Indonesian-American political scientist and author

- Born: August 4, 1987 (age 39); Jakarta, Indonesia
- Writing career
- Genres: horror, weird fiction

Nadia Bulkin is an Indonesian-American political scientist and author of short stories, largely in the horror genre.

== Biography ==
Bulkin was born in Indonesia to a Muslim father and Christian mother. Her parents decided to leave Indonesia soon after the death of Suharto. She moved to Nebraska with her family when she was 11.

She graduated summa cum laude from Barnard College with a degree in political science before earning her master's at American University's School of International Service.

Bulkin currently works as a consultant in Washington, D.C. She is a senior associate at The Asia Group, a strategy and capital advisory group.

Short stories by Bulkin have been published in ChiZine, Strange Horizons, Three-lobed Burning Eye, and the Simon Strantzas-edited anthology Aickman's Heirs.

== Awards and recognition ==
In 2018, she was nominated in the Shirley Jackson Awards for both short fiction ("Live Through This") and Single-Author Collection (She Said Destroy, Word Horde, 2017).

In 2024, she won the Shirley Jackson Award for Edited Anthology for Why Didn’t You Just Leave, edited with Julia Rios.
