= Dale Bailey =

American author of speculative fiction

- Born: January 24, 1968 (age 58); Princeton, West Virginia, U.S.
- Occupation: Author
- Writing career
- Genre: speculative fiction
- Website: dalebailey.com

Dale Frederick Bailey (born January 24, 1968) is an American author of speculative fiction, including science fiction, fantasy and horror, active in the field since 1993. He writes as Dale Bailey.

== Biography ==
Bailey grew up in Princeton, West Virginia and currently lives in North Carolina with his family. He teaches English and Creative Writing at Lenoir–Rhyne University.

== Literary career ==
Bailey has stated, "One of the abiding disappointments of my life is that I’ve never had any of the interesting jobs that writers are supposed to have. I was never a gandy dancer or a stevedore. I never drove an ambulance on the Italian Front. I just went to school to study literature and started writing stories." He has cited Ray Bradbury as his most important literary influence, along with Zenna Henderson, Clifford D. Simak and Stephen King. Other early influences included J. R. R. Tolkien, C. S. Lewis, Robert Silverberg, George R. R. Martin, Robert A. Heinlein, and Isaac Asimov.

His 2002 story "Death and Suffrage" has been adapted for television as Homecoming, an episode of Showtime’s Masters of Horror series first aired in 2005.

Much of Bailey's short work has initially been published in The Magazine of Fantasy & Science Fiction, but it has also appeared in various other periodicals and webzines, including Amazing Stories, Asimov's Science Fiction, Clarkesworld Magazine, Lightspeed, Nightmare Magazine, Pulphouse, Sci Fiction, and Tor.com, as well as the original anthologies Echoes, Lovecraft Unbound: Twenty Stories, Oz Reimagined: New Tales from the Emerald City and Beyond, Queen Victoria's Book of Spells: An Anthology of Gaslamp Fantasy, and ZvR Diplomacy: A Zombies vs Robots Collection.

Some of his works have been translated into French, German, Italian, or Spanish.

== Bibliography ==
=== Novels ===
- The Fallen. New York: Signet. 2002.
- House of Bones (2003)
- Sleeping Policemen (2006) (with Jack Slay, Jr.)
- The Subterranean Season (2015)
- In the Night Wood (2018)

=== Short fiction ===
Collections

- The Resurrection Man's Legacy (2003)
- The End of the End of Everything: Stories (2015)
- This Island Earth: 8 Features from the Drive-In (2023)

Stories

- "Eidelman's Machine" (1993)
- "Touched" (1993)
- "Notes Toward a Proof of the Theorem: Love Is Hunger" (1994)
- "Conquistador" (1994)
- "Giants in the Earth" (1994)
- "Home Burial" (1994)
- "Epiphany" (1995)
- "The Resurrection Man's Legacy" (1995)
- "Sheep's Clothing" (1995)
- "The Mall" (1996)
- "Interval of Stillness" (1996)
- "Quinn's Way" (1997)
- "Exodus" (1997)
- "Night of the Fireflies" (1998)
- "Cockroach" (1998)
- "The Rain at the End of the World" (1999)
- "The Anencephalic Fields" (2000)
- "Inheritance" (2000)
- "Heat" (2000)
- "Death and Suffrage" (2002)
- "In Green's Dominion" (2002)
- "Hunger: A Confession" (2003)
- "The Census Taker" (2003)
- "Passing to the Distant Shore" (2004
- "The End of the World as We Know It" (2004)
- "Spells for Halloween: An Acrostic" (2004)
- "The Crevasse" (2009) (with Nathan Ballingrud)
- "Silence" (2010)
- "Eating at the End-of-the-World Café" (2010)
- "Necrosis" (2012)
- "The Children of Hamelin" (2012)
- "Mating Habits of the Late Cretaceous" (2012)
- "City So Bright" (2013)
- "This Is How You Disappear" (2013)
- "Mr. Splitfoot" (2013)
- "The Bluehole" (2013)
- "Exclusion Zone" (2013)
- "A Rumor of Angels" (2013)
- "The Creature Recants" (2013)
- "Sleep Paralysis" (2014)
- "The End of the End of Everything" (2014)
- "The Culvert" (2014)
- "Troop 9" (2014) (Novelette)
- "Lightning Jack's Last Ride" (2015)
- "The Ministry of the Eye" (2015)
- "Snow" (2015)
- "I Married a Monster from Outer Space" (2016)
- "Teenagers from Outer Space" (2016)
- "I Was a Teenage Werewolf" (2016)
- "Invasion of the Saucer-Men" (2017)
- "Come as You Are" (2017)
- "The Donner Party" (2018)
- "The Ghoul Goes West" (2018)
- "Rules of Biology" (2018)
- "The Horror of Party Beach" (2018)
- "Precipice" (2019)
- "Das Gesicht" (2020)
- "I Summon You" (2021)

=== Nonfiction ===
- American Nightmares: The Haunted House Formula in American Popular Fiction (1999)
- The H Word (Essays):
  - The Failure of Fear (2013)
  - Bringing the Horror Home (2013)
  - Monsters and Metaphors (2016)

== Awards ==
Bailey's work has been nominated for numerous genre literary awards, and won several.

| Work | Year & Award | Category | Result | Ref. |
|---|---|---|---|---|
| The Resurrection Man's Legacy | 1996 Nebula Award | Novelette | Nominated | |
| Quinn's Way | 1998 Locus Award | Novelette | Nominated | |
| The Fallen | 2002 International Horror Guild Award | First Novel | Nominated | |
| Death and Suffrage | 2002 International Horror Guild Award | Intermediate Form | Won | |
| The Resurrection Man's Legacy and Other Stories | 2004 Locus Award | Collection | Nominated | |
| The Census Taker | 2003 International Horror Guild Award | Mid-Length Fiction | Nominated | |
| The Census Taker | 2004 Locus Award | Novelette | Nominated | |
| The End of the World as We Know It | 2004 International Horror Guild | Short Fiction | Nominated | |
| The End of the World as We Know It | 2006 Nebula Award | Short Story | Nominated | |
| The Crevasse (with Nathan Ballingrud) | 2011 Shirley Jackson Award | Short Fiction | Nominated | |
| Eating at the End-of-the-World Café | 2011 Locus Award | Novelette | Nominated | |
| The Bluehole | 2013 Bram Stoker Award | Long Fiction | Nominated | |
| Mating Habits of the Late Cretaceous | 2013 Locus Award | Novelette | Nominated | |
| Mating Habits of the Late Cretaceous | 2013 Asimov's Readers' Poll | Novelette | 4th Place | |
| The End of the End of Everything | 2014 Shirley Jackson Award | Novelette | Won | |
| The End of the End of Everything | 2015 Locus Award | Novelette | Nominated | |
| The End of the End of Everything: Stories | 2016 Shirley Jackson Award | Collection | Nominated | |
| The End of the End of Everything: Stories | 2016 Locus Award | Collection | Nominated | |
| I Married a Monster from Outer Space | 2017 Asimov's Readers' Poll | Novelette | Won | |
| Rules of Biology | 2019 Asimov's Readers' Poll | Short Story | Finalist | |
| In the Night Wood | 2019 World Fantasy Award | Novel | Nominated | |
| In the Night Wood | 2019 Locus Award | Horror Novel | Nominated | |
| In the Night Wood | 2019 Shirley Jackson Award | Novel | Nominated | |
| The Donner Party | 2019 Locus Award | Novelette | Nominated | |
| The Ghoul Goes West | 2019 Locus Award | Novelette | Nominated | |
