= Livia Llewellyn =

Alaskan short story horror writer

- Born: Anchorage, Alaska, USA
- Website: http://liviallewellyn.com/

Livia Llewellyn is an American short story horror writer from Alaska.

== Biography ==
Livia Llewellyn was born in Anchorage, Alaska. She spent time working for Tor in New York and works as a secretary. She also worked as a theatre actor for twenty years. Llewellyn is best known as a short story writer and has had her work published in magazines including Subterranean Press, Apex Magazine and The Magazine of Bizarro Fiction, as well as anthologies like Ellen Datlow’s The Best Horror of the Year series. In 2011, Engines of Desire: Tales of Love & Other Horrors was nominated for the Shirley Jackson Award for Best Collection while Omphalos was nominated for the Shirley Jackson Award for Best Novelette. Llewellyn's story Furnace was nominated in 2013 for a Shirley Jackson Award for Best Short Story. Her work is translated into Italian.

Llewellyn won the 2020 Edgar Allan Poe Award for best short story with "One of These Nights," from Cutting Edge: New Stories of Mystery and Crime by Women Writers.

== Bibliography ==
Collections

- Engines of Desire: Tales of Love & Other Horrors (2011)
- Furnace (2016)

Short Fiction

- Brimstone Orange (2005)
- At the Edge of Ellensburg (2006)
- Jetsam (2007)
- The Unattainable (2007)
- The Four Hundred Thousand (2007)
- The Foraging (2008)
- Teslated Salishan Evergreen (2008)
- The Engine of Desire (2008)
- Horses (2009)
- Panopticon (2010)
- Omphalos (2011)
- Summer of Love (2011)
- And Love Shall Have No Dominion (2011)
- Lord of the Hunt (2012)
- The Girls of the World (2012)
- Cinereous (2013)
- Stabilimentum (2013)
- Wasp & Snake (2013)
- Furnace (2013)
- Yours Is the Right to Begin (2013)
- The Mysteries (2014)
- It Feels Better Biting Down (2014)
- The Last, Clean, Bright Summer (2014)
- Allochthon (2014)
- Pureland (2015)
- The One That Comes Before (2015)
- In the Court of King Cupressaceae, 1982 (2016)
- Bright Crown of Joy (2016)
- The Low, Dark Edge of Life (2016)
- The Acid Test (2017)
- The Hotel Pelagornis, 1899 (2017)
- The Gin House, 1935 (2017)

Poems

- Silver Night Train (2012)
- The God of Suburbia (2012)
