= Three-Lobed Burning Eye =

Speculative fiction magazine

- Founder: Andrew S. Fuller
- Founded: 1999
- Based in: Online
- Website: www.3lobedmag.com

Three-Lobed Burning Eye is an online magazine of speculative fiction edited by Andrew S. Fuller. First published in 1999, it features stories from the genres of horror, dark fantasy, and science fiction, as well as magical realism or slipstream. All issues are collected in an annual print anthology. It is sometimes referred to as 3LBE magazine, with the subhead, "Stories that monsters like to read."

== History ==
Years before the online incarnation, Three-Lobed Burning Eye was an independent literary magazine founded by Fuller and his friend Matthew Duncan while attending Bowling Green State University as creative writing students. Its original run lasted four printed issues in 1991–1993, with Duncan switching focus to his own literary magazine. 3LBE is currently published by Legion Press in Portland, Oregon.

In 1998, Fuller revived the magazine in name, with a direction more appropriate to the title, publishing decidedly more speculative fiction. Poetry, reviews, interviews, and even the editorial letter were considered distractions from a simple set of stories. At the time, the online format and an email submission system were not widely accepted practices for magazines.

Publishing frequency has changed from the original quarterly schedule, to triannual, to "2–3 times per year," with a few unintentional hiatuses, which have made the print anthologies less than annual. All issues remain archived online. Though the backend of the website has changed many times using CSS development, the magazine retains its original intention of one story per page, without advertising. Print annuals I–IV were available in limited black-and-white or color editions, and are now out of print. Volumes VI–VIII feature new interior artwork for each story.

The magazine's name is a vague reference to H. P. Lovecraft's story "The Haunter of the Dark," in which the character Robert Blake concludes the story's narrative with his terrified record of what he can only glimpse of the approaching beast. "I see it – coming here – hell-wind – titan-blur – black wings – Yog-Sothoth save me – the three-lobed burning eye...". Despite the title's origin, the magazine has largely avoided publishing Cthulhu Mythos stories.

== Authors ==
Early issues featured stories by Gemma Files, D. F. Lewis, Laird Barron, Tim Waggoner, and Kealan Patrick Burke. More recent issues have included fiction by Adam Browne, Lida Broadhurst, Nadia Bulkin, Cody Goodfellow, J. M. McDermott, Darren Speegle, Edward Morris, and Shweta Narayan.

== Artists ==
The first fifteen issues and four annuals included an art gallery, and featured award-winning artists like Joachim Luetke, David Ho, and Alessandro Bavari. Cover artist Rew X is Fuller's visual artist pseudonym.

== Awards and recognition ==
In 2011, "A Feather's Weight" by Jessica Reisman (issue 19) and "The Edge of the World" by DeAnna Knippling (issue 20) were included on the honorable mentions list in Best Horror of the Year Volume 3 by Ellen Datlow.

== See also ==
- Science fiction magazine
- Fantasy fiction magazine
- Horror fiction magazine
