= Camilla Grudova =

Canadian writer

- Born: Canada
- Education: McGill University
- Occupation: Writer

Camilla Grudova is a Canadian writer. She is known for The Doll's Alphabet, published by Fitzcarraldo Editions, and the novel Children of Paradise, published by Atlantic Books.

Grudova originally posted stories on her Tumblr blog before being spotted by an editor from The White Review.

== Biography ==
Grudova received a bachelor's degree in art history and German from McGill University.

She lives in Edinburgh, Scotland.

== Awards and honours ==
In 2023, Grudova was named on the Granta Best of Young British Novelists list, compiled every 10 years since 1983, identifying the 20 most significant British novelists aged under 40.

Awards for Grudova's writing
Year	Title	Award	Result	Ref.
2016	"Waxy" (Granta 136)	Shirley Jackson Award for Best Novelette	Winner	
2017	"Waxy" (Granta 136)	British Fantasy Award for Short Fiction	Shortlist	
2023	Children of Paradise	Women's Prize for Fiction	Longlist	

== Books ==
- The Doll's Alphabet (2017, Fitzcarraldo Editions, ISBN 978-1-9106-9537-1)
- Children of Paradise (2022, Atlantic Books, ISBN 978-1-8389-5631-8)
- The Coiled Serpent (2023, Atlantic Books, ISBN 978-1-8389-5635-6)
