= Readercon =

Science fiction convention in the Boston, Massachusetts area

- Status: Active
- Genre: Science fiction
- Venue: Boston Marriott Burlington
- Location: Boston, Massachusetts
- Country: United States
- Inaugurated: June 26, 1987
- Website: https://readercon.org/

Readercon is an annual science fiction convention, typically held every July in the Boston, Massachusetts area, currently taking place in Burlington, Massachusetts. It was founded by Bob Colby and Eric Van in 1987 with the goal of focusing almost exclusively on science fiction, fantasy, slipstream and speculative fiction in the written form. On the rare occasion that there is a discussion held about non-written science fiction, it will have a tongue-in-cheek title such as "Our biannual media panel".

Each convention has at least one guest of honor. Past guests of honor have included authors such as Greer Gilman, Gene Wolfe, Octavia E. Butler, Samuel R. Delany, Karen Joy Fowler, Brian Aldiss, Nalo Hopkinson, Joe Haldeman, Caitlín R. Kiernan, Peter Straub, and China Miéville, and editors such as Ellen Datlow and David G. Hartwell. The convention also makes a point of honoring a deceased author as the Memorial Guest of Honor. In 2009, for instance, the guests of honor were the living writers Elizabeth Hand and Greer Gilman and the memorial guest of honor was Hope Mirrlees.

As of 2012, attendance at the convention has been consistently around 850 for several years.

From 2005 to 2011, Readercon was the official venue for presentation of the Rhysling Award. It has hosted the Shirley Jackson Awards since their founding in 2007.

== Conventions ==
At least one Guest of Honor and typically one Memorial Guest of Honor are featured during each convention.

Year	Dates	Name	Venue	Location	Guests of Honor	Memorial	Chair	Program
1987	June 27–28	Readercon 1	Holiday Inn of Brookline	Brookline, MA	Gene Wolfe	Philip K. Dick		
1988	November 18–20	Readercon 2	Lowell Hilton	Lowell, MA	Samuel R. Delany	Theodore Sturgeon		
1990	March 30-April	Readercon 3	Lowell Hilton	Lowell, MA	John Crowley, Thomas M. Disch	T. H. White		RC3 Program Guide
1991	July 12–14	Readercon 4	Worcester Marriott	Worcester, MA	Barry N. Malzberg, John Clute			RC4 Program Guide
1992	July 10–12	Readercon 5	Worcester Marriott	Worcester, MA	Michael Bishop, Richard M. Powers	James Tiptree Jr.		RC5 Program Guide
1993	July 9–11	Readercon 6	Worcester Marriott	Worcester, MA	Brian Aldiss, Judith Merril	H. G. Wells		RC6 Program Guide
1994	July 8–10	Readercon 7	Worcester Marriott	Worcester, MA	Ursula K. LeGuin, Terri Windling	Cordwainer Smith		RC7 Program Guide
1996	July 12–14	Readercon 8	Boston Marriott Westborough	Westborough, MA	William Gibson, Larry McCaffrey	Alfred Bester		RC8 Program Guide
1997	July 11–13	Readercon 9	Boston Marriott Westborough	Westborough, MA	Kim Stanley Robinson, Algis Budrys	Cyril M. Kornbluth		RC9 Program Guide
1998	July 10–12	Readercon 10	Boston Marriott Westborough	Westborough, MA	Bruce Sterling, Lisa Goldstein	Leigh Brackett		RC10 Program Guide
1999	July 9–11	Readercon 11	Westin Waltham	Waltham, MA	Harlan Ellison, Ellen Datlow	Gerald Kersh		RC11 Program Guide
2000	July 21–23	Readercon 12	Boston Marriott Burlington	Burlington, MA	Michael Moorcock, Suzy McKee Charnas	Mervyn Peake		RC12 Program Guide
2001	July 13–15	Readercon 13	Boston Marriott Burlington	Burlington, MA	Michael Swanwick, David Hartwell	Clifford D. Simak		RC13 Program Guide
2002	July 12–14	Readercon 14	Boston Marriott Burlington	Burlington, MA	Octavia E. Butler, Gwyneth Jones	John Brunner		RC14 Program Guide
2003	July 11–13	Readercon 15	Boston Marriott Burlington	Burlington, MA	Hal Clement, Rudy Rucker, Howard Waldrop	R. A. Lafferty		RC15 Program Guide
2005	July 8–10	Readercon 16	Boston Marriott Burlington	Burlington, MA	Joe Haldeman, Kate Wilhelm	Henry Kuttner, C. L. Moore		RC16 Program Guide
2006	July 7–9	Readercon 17	Boston Marriott Burlington	Burlington, MA	China Miéville, James K. Morrow	Jorge Luis Borges		RC17 Program Guide
2007	July 5–8	Readercon 18	Boston Marriott Burlington	Burlington, MA	Lucius Shepard, Karen Joy Fowler	Angela Carter		RC18 Program Guide
2008	July 17–20	Readercon 19	Boston Marriott Burlington	Burlington, MA	Jonathan Lethem, James Patrick Kelly	Stanislaw Lem		RC19 Program Guide
2009	July 9–12	Readercon 20	Boston Marriott Burlington	Burlington, MA	Elizabeth Hand, Greer Gilman	Hope Mirrlees		RC20 Program Guide
2010	July 8–11	Readercon 21	Boston Marriott Burlington	Burlington, MA	Nalo Hopkinson, Charles Stross	Olaf Stapledon		RC21 Program Guide
2011	July 14–17	Readercon 22	Boston Marriott Burlington	Burlington, MA	Geoff Ryman, Gardner Dozois	Mark Twain		RC22 Program Guide
2012	July 12–15	Readercon 23	Boston Marriott Burlington	Burlington, MA	Peter Straub, Caitlín R. Kiernan	Shirley Jackson		RC23 Program Guide
2013	July 11–14	Readercon 24	Boston Marriott Burlington	Burlington, MA	Maureen F. McHugh, Patricia A. McKillip	Roger Zelazny		RC24 Program Guide
2014	July 10–13	Readercon 25	Boston Marriott Burlington	Burlington, MA	Andrea Hairston, Kit Reed	Mary Shelley		RC25 Program Guide
2015	July 9–12	Readercon 26	Boston Marriott Burlington	Burlington, MA	Nicola Griffith, Gary K. Wolfe	Joanna Russ		RC26 Program Guide
2016	July 7–10	Readercon 27	Boston Quincy Marriott	Quincy, MA	Catherynne M. Valente, Tim Powers	Diana Wynne Jones)		RC27 Program Guide
2017	July 13–16	Readercon 28	Boston Quincy Marriott	Quincy, MA	Naomi Novik, Nnedi Okorafor	Tanith Lee		RC28 Program Guide
2018	July 12–15	Readercon 29	Boston Quincy Marriott	Quincy, MA	Ken Liu, Nisi Shawl	E. Nesbit		RC29 Program Guide
2019	July 11–14	Readercon 30	Boston Quincy Marriott	Quincy, MA	Tananarive Due, Stephen Graham Jones	Edward Bryant		RC30 Program Guide
2021	August 13–15	Readercon 31	online		Jeffrey Ford, Ursula Vernon	Vonda N. McIntyre		RC31 Program Guide
2023	July 13–16	Readercon 32	Boston Quincy Marriott	Quincy, MA	Jeff VanderMeer, Justina Ireland	L.A. Banks		RC32 Program Guide
2024	July 11–14	Readercon 33	Boston Quincy Marriott	Quincy, MA	Rebecca Roanhorse, Amal El-Mohtar	Naomi Mitchison		RC33 Program Guide
2025	July 17–20	Readercon 34	Boston Marriott Burlington	Burlington, MA	Cecilia Tan and P. Djèlí Clark	Charles R. Saunders		RC34 Program Guide
