= Shirley Jackson Award =

Literary award for works of dark fantasy and psychological suspense

- Awarded for: "Outstanding achievement in the literature of psychological suspense, horror, and the dark fantastic"
- Presented by: Readercon
- First award: 2007; 19 years ago
- Website: shirleyjacksonawards.org

The Shirley Jackson Awards are literary awards named after Shirley Jackson in recognition of her legacy in writing. These awards for outstanding achievement in the literature of psychological suspense, horror and dark fantasy are presented at Readercon, an annual conference on imaginative literature.

== History ==
The first annual Shirley Jackson Awards were presented on July 20, 2008, at the Readercon Conference on Imaginative Literature in Burlington, Massachusetts. They honored works published in 2007. The jurors were John Langan, Sarah Langan, Paul G. Tremblay and F. Brett Cox.

== Process ==
The awards are voted upon by a jury, with input from the board of advisors. The jury is composed of professional writers, editors, critics, and academics. The awards are given for works published in the previous calendar year. Works produced by members of the jury are not eligible during the calendar year during which they serve as judges. Members of the board of advisors may recommend works to the judges, but they do not vote on works.

== Categories ==
Category	Description
Best Novel	Fictional work of 40,000 words or more
Best Novella	Fictional work of between 17,500 and 39,999 words
Best Novelette	Fictional work of between 7,500 and 17,499 words
Best Short Fiction	Fictional work of less than 7,500 words
Best Single-Author Collection	At least 40,000 words, consisting of at least 3 fictional works by a single author. At least half of the collection’s contents must be fiction.
Best Edited Anthology	At least 40,000 words, consisting of at least 3 stories by 3 or more authors. At least half of the included works must have been previously unpublished.

=== Special awards ===
At the discretion of the jury, a Special Award may be awarded outside of the normal categories. In 2010, a Board of Directors Award was presented to Joyce Carol Oates. In 2016, Ruth Franklin was awarded a Board of Directors Award for the biography Shirley Jackson: A Rather Haunted Life. In 2021, a Special Award was presented to Ellen Datlow for the anthology When Things Get Dark: Stories Inspired by Shirley Jackson.

== Recognition ==
Writing in Salon in 2010, Laura Miller noted, "The awards...have already proved a fitting tribute to a writer who roamed freely over similar ground and has never quite gotten the respect she deserves." A 2023 article in The Harvard Crimson stated that the award "crosses stylistic and geographical boundaries, nominating diverse authors from across the world."

All Shirley Jackson Award finalists receive an engraved stone to commemorate their achievement, a practice inspired by Jackson's short story "The Lottery."
