= Ledfeather =

Novel by Stephen Graham Jones

- First Edition Cover
- Author: Stephen Graham Jones
- Cover artist: Jacket design by
- Language: English
- Genre: Novel
- Publisher: FC2
- Publication date: August 8, 2008
- Publication place: United States
- Media type: Print (Paperback)
- Pages: 216 pp (first edition, paperback)
- Preceded by: Demon Theory
- Followed by: The Long Trial of Nolan Dugatti

Ledfeather is a 2008 novel by Native American author Stephen Graham Jones, published by FC2 (Fiction Collective Two).

== Plot summary ==
A young Blackfoot man discovers the 1883 letters of an Indian Agent, whose decisions have "impacted the lives of generations of Blackfeet Indians." As the novel progresses, it is shown that this young man, Doby Saxon, and the Indian Agent may be the same soul inhabiting two separate bodies, and the Indian Agent has been forced to live in the future on the same reservation still plagued by the consequences of his decision.

== Characters ==
Doby Saxon
a Blackfoot living on the Blackfeet Indian Reservation
Francis Dalimpere
1883 Indian Agent for the Blackfeet.
Malory Sainte
Doby's mother.
Claire Dalimpere
Francis's wife, the recipient of his letters.
Yellow Tail
1883 Chief for the Blackfeet.
Lead Feather
a young boy found by Francis, who has attempted to commit suicide.

== Motifs ==
"Cyclical stuff, iterations, rhythm (which is just repetition with variance)—I can’t seem to stay away from it," was the author's comment in a 2008 interview with Rain Taxi online.

== Reception ==
Foreword Reviews described the work as "hallucinogenic lyricism and a nonlinear narrative."

Lit Pub reviewer Edward J. Rathke found the novel to be a remedy for heartbreak: "The next thing I knew, the sun was rising and my heart was breaking, but in a good way, the way that resurrects you, that shows you everything you forgot to pay attention to, forgot to remember, and I closed it because it was done, again, finished for the third time, and I could’ve turned back to page one and began again, which is how the first two readings happened, in consecutive days, because this book burns you, burrows deep, and smolders, lives, reconnects cells, and balances chemistry."

== See also ==
- The Fast Red Road: A Plainsong (2000)
- All The Beautiful Sinners (2003)
- The Bird is Gone: A Manifesto (2003)
- Bleed Into Me (2005)
- Demon Theory (2006)
- The Long Trial of Nolan Dugatti (2008)
