= Audie Award for Horror =

Annual award for audiobooks

The Audie Award for Horror, established in 2025, is one of several Audie Awards presented annually by the Audio Publishers Association. It awards excellence in narration, production, and content for an horror audiobook released in a given year.

== Recipients ==
Audie Award for Horror winners and finalists
| Year | Title | Author(s) | Narrator(s) | Publisher | Result | Ref. |
|---|---|---|---|---|---|---|
| 2025 | Bury Your Gays | Chuck Tingle | André Santana and a full cast | Macmillan Audio | Winner | |
| 2025 | The Angel of Indian Lake (2024) | Stephen Graham Jones | Isabella Star LaBlanc, Barbara Crampton, and a full cast | Simon & Schuster Audio | Finalist | |
| 2025 | I Was a Teenage Slasher | Stephen Graham Jones | Michael Crouch and Stephen Graham Jones | Simon & Schuster Audio | Finalist | |
| 2025 | Swarm | Jennifer D. Lyle | Krystal Hammond | Blackstone | Finalist | |
| 2025 | A Darker Shade of Noir: New Stories of Body Horror by Women Writers | Joyce Carol Oates (editor) | Bianca Amato, Lynette R. Freeman, Eva Kaminsky, and Nancy Wu | Recorded Books | Finalist | |
| 2026 | The Buffalo Hunter Hunter | Stephen Graham Jones | Shane Ghostkeeper, Marin Ireland, and Owen Teale | Simon & Schuster Audio | Winner | |
| 2026 | Bat Eater and Other Names for Cora Zeng | Kylie Lee Baker | Natalie Naudus | HarperAudio | Finalist | |
| 2026 | Breathe In, Bleed Out | Brian McAuley | Jeremy Carlisle Parker | Sourcebooks | Finalist | |
| 2026 | Coffin Moon | Keith Rosson | Pete Cross | Penguin Random House Audio | Finalist | |
| 2026 | They Bloom at Night | Trang Thanh Tran | Nhi Do | Bloomsbury PLC | Finalist | |
