= Flowers for the Sea =

2021 novella by Zin E. Rocklyn

- Author: Zin E. Rocklyn
- Audio read by: Amina Koroma
- Language: English
- Publisher: Tordotcom
- Publication date: 19 October 2021
- Publication place: United States
- Pages: 108
- Awards: 2021 Shirley Jackson Award for Best Novella
- ISBN: 9781250804037

Flowers for the Sea is a 2021 novella by Zin E. Rocklyn. It won the 2021 Shirley Jackson Award for Best Novella.

== Plot ==
Sea levels rise due to a climate apocalypse. A group of humans leaves land and lives aboard a ship. Iraxi is allowed to board the ship after her family is lynched. Iraxi was burned and scarred during the attack.

After several years aboard the ship, many women and children have died in childbirth. Food runs low, monstrous creatures called razorfangs circle the ship, and the community's prospects for long-term survival are bleak. Iraxi becomes pregnant by Hirat, another survivor. She is despised by the others while simultaneously serving as a symbol of hope for humanity's survival. Iraxi hates and fears her pregnancy, unsure if the fetus is even human. She has a contentious relationship with the physician Ket, as well as Amit, a man whom she previously rejected.

Iraxi goes into labor, seeing a vision of sea creatures and a giant bird. She overhears Ket and Hirat, realizing that they have been sleeping together. She believes that they will kill her once the child is born. Amit asks Iraxi about her feelings for Hirat. Iraxi admits she does not love Hirat, but angrily turns Amit away.

Iraxi gives birth to a baby girl. The girl's eyes are solid purple. Tendrils of light move from the child's eyes to Iraxi, who begins to scream. Iraxi is convinced that she has birthed a demon and begs for the onlookers to throw the baby overboard. Razorfangs attack the ship. She is dragged below decks and passes out.

She awakens to find Ket cleaning her wounds. Ket admits that she must keep Iraxi alive for long enough to strengthen the baby. Iraxi is then sent to her own quarters. The baby speaks to her. The baby begins breastfeeding, claiming that they must bond. Iraxi experiences a series of dark dreams. When she wakes up, she notices that her daughter has three sets of gills. Iraxi notices that she herself has three sets of scars on her ribcage; her burn scars begin to heal and her hair grows back.

She has a flashback to the night her family died. Iraxi meets a creature similar to a mermaid, which promises that her anger will change the world. Iraxi brings her child aboveboard. A razorfang rises from the sea. Iraxi mounts the creature and leaves the ship. She locks eyes with Amit, then orders the creatures to destroy the boat and all its inhabitants.

== Reception and awards ==
Becky Spratford of Library Journal gave the book a starred review, calling it "captivating and disquieting." Spratford praised the prose and worldbuilding, stating that the novella engages all five of the reader's senses. Spratford wrote that the book is "an astounding story that will leave readers begging for more," comparing it to works such as Ormeshadow by Priya Sharma and The Black God's Drums by P. Djèlí Clark.

Writing for Locus, author and critic Gabino Iglesias called the book "fantastical, smart, and horrific." Iglesias praised Rocklyn's ability to "[weave] in and out of different genres" while maintaining a fast-paced story. The review praised the novella's themes of Otherness and its raw, honest look at the reality of childbirth. Iglesias called Rocklyn "a voice to watch."

AudioFile Magazine praised the audiobook, narrated by Amina Koroma. The review called the novella "dark yet poetic" and particularly praised the voice of Iraxi. The review lauded "Koroma's empathetic depiction of the rage, terror, and helplessness of Iraxi's locked-in existence."

Jeremy Brett of Ancillary Review of Books praised the simple and direct prose, stating that Rocklyn's skill as an author prevents the book from becoming "cheap trauma porn." Instead, the character of Iraxi "is a fully-realized character, full of realistically raw feeling..." Brett praised the vengeful tone as "emotionally satisfying" and wrote that the novella explores "human psychological and physical endurance."

Publishers Weekly called the book a "lyrical gothic fantasy debut." The review praised the prose and the novella's depiction of Iraxi's precarious situation. The same review criticized the tight focus on the pregnancy, writing that "the narrative [feels] stagnant at times, as the ark lacks direction both literally and metaphorically..."

Year	Award	Category	Result	Ref.
2021	Nebula Award	Novella	Nominated	
2021	Shirley Jackson Award	Novella	Won	
2022	Ignyte Award	Novella	Finalist	
