= Night of the Mannequins =

2020 novella by Stephen Graham Jones

- First edition trade paperback
- Author: Stephen Graham Jones
- Audio read by: Gary Tiedemann
- Language: English
- Genre: Horror, slasher
- Set in: East Texas
- Publisher: Tor.com
- Publication date: September 1, 2020
- Publication place: United States
- Media type: Print (trade paperback), ebook, audiobook
- Pages: 132 pp.
- ISBN: 9781250752079 (paperback 1st edition)
- OCLC: 1190905015
- Dewey Decimal: 813.54
- LC Class: PS3560.O5395 N54 2020

Night of the Mannequins is a 2020 novella by Native American author Stephen Graham Jones. The book was released through Tor.com and was awarded the 2020 Bram Stoker Award for Best Long Fiction and the 2020 Shirley Jackson Award for Best Novella.

== Synopsis ==
Per the publisher's synopsis:

We thought we'd play a fun prank on her, and now most of us are dead.

One last laugh for the summer as it winds down. One last prank just to scare a friend. Bringing a mannequin into a theater is just some harmless fun, right? Until it wakes up. Until it starts killing.

Luckily, Sawyer has a plan. He’ll be a hero. He'll save everyone to the best of his ability. He'll do whatever he needs to so he can save the day. That's the thing about heroes—sometimes you have to become a monster first.

== Development ==
While developing the story, Stephen Graham Jones wanted to write a "short slasher, but a different kind." He chose to have the plot's action start as the result of a prank. He finds "When you’re writing a slasher, they always start with a prank, crime, or trespass to open the cycle of injustice." Jones wrote the story with Sawyer as the central character and narrator to explore the concept of the villain being "the hero of his own story," as Jones wanted to know what it would be like from their point of view.

== Release ==
Night of the Mannequins was first published in paperback and ebook formats in the United States on September 1, 2020, through Tor.com. An audiobook adaptation narrated by Gary Tiedermann was published through Tantor Audio on February 23, 2021.

== Reception ==
Critical reception for Night of the Mannequins has been favorable. Common elements of praise centered upon the character Sawyer, who Paula Guran of Locus felt was a "convincing and endearing protagonist." Reviewing for Booklist, Emily Whitmore noted that the book was "a fever dream of a horror novella, where the reader is never quite sure what is happening or whom to trust." The book was also reviewed for Transmotion by Gage Karahkwí:io Diabo, who compared the work to Stephen Graham Jones's The Only Good Indians, noting that "whereas The Only Good Indians signalled its ties to coloniality and Indigenous kinship principles right from the title, Mannequins, which does not identify its characters as Indigenous or otherwise, takes an approach that is perhaps easier to miss."

== Awards ==
Year	Award	Category	Result	Ref.
2020	Bram Stoker Award	Long Fiction	Won	
2020	Shirley Jackson Award	Novella	Won	
