= The Buffalo Hunter Hunter =

2025 novel by Stephen Graham Jones

- Author: Stephen Graham Jones
- Audio read by: Shane Ghostkeeper, Marin Ireland, and Owen Teale
- Genre: Historical fiction; Paranormal fiction; Horror novel; Fantasy novel
- Publisher: Saga
- Publication date: March 18, 2025
- Pages: 448
- Awards: Bram Stoker Award for Best Novel (2025); Nebula Award for Best Novel (2025); Audie Award for Horror (2026); Locus Award for Best Horror Novel (2026); British Fantasy Award for Best Horror Novel (2026)
- ISBN: 978-1-668-07508-1

The Buffalo Hunter Hunter is a 2025 novel by Native American author Stephen Graham Jones. It tells the story of Etsy Beaucarne, a professor who discovers a manuscript written by her ancestor Arthur. Arthur's manuscript narrates the story of Good Stab, a Blackfeet Indian with a mysterious past.

The novel received critical acclaim and has won multiple notable awards, including the Bram Stoker Award for Best Novel, Locus Award for Best Horror Novel, and Nebula Award for Best Novel. Reviewers have praised the book for its exploration of Native American history, genocide, and a unique take on the vampire genre.

== Plot ==
In 2012, a worker discovers a manuscript in a parsonage. The manuscript was written by Lutheran pastor Arthur Beaucarne. Etsy Beaucarne, a descendant of the author, transcribes the manuscript.

Beaucarne's manuscript describes events that take place in Miles City, Montana in 1912. A stranger's skinless corpse is found in town. Soon after, an Indian man begins attending Beaucarne’s church. The man, Good Stab, asks if he may confess to Beaucarne. Over the following weeks, Good Stab recounts the story of his life.

Good Stab claims that he was born in 1833, despite appearing to be a man in his late thirties. In 1870, Good Stab and his companions encountered a pale-skinned man with large fangs, whom Good Stab calls the Cat Man. Good Stab and his companions are attacked by white soldiers. As Good Stab dies, the Cat Man’s blood drips into his mouth. Good Stab awakens. He kills a soldier and drinks his blood. As Good Stab continues to travel in the wilderness, he learns more about his new condition. He can only consume blood, and he will grow to resemble any creature that he eats. Therefore, if he wishes to retain a human body, he must feed upon humans.

Good Stab learns of the Marias Massacre, which happened on the same night that Good Stab encountered the Cat Man. Good Stab continues to tell stories of his survival in the wilderness, including his violent encounters with white buffalo hunters, his parasitic relationship with surviving Blackfeet and other Native Americans, and his encounters with Napi, a supernatural entity.

In Miles City, a Pinkerton detective named Dove searches for a missing family from San Francisco. The skinless man is revealed to be Benjamin Flowers; his three sons Archibald, Milo, and Arthur are also missing. Dove is later killed by a train. Beaucarne asks the sheriff to confront Good Stab, but the sheriff also disappears.

Beaucarne deduces that Good Stab is confessing to him as a result of Beaucarne’s past sins. He decides to leave Miles City, seeking absolution. Good Stab attacks Beaucarne and brings him back to the church. Seated in the pews are the bodies of the missing sheriff, the Flowers family, and several other townspeople. Good Stab accuses Beaucarne of being one of the perpetrators of the Marias Massacre. Benjamin Flowers was Beaucarne’s illegitimate son, and Good Stab has killed Beaucarne’s descendants for vengeance.

Good Stab finishes his confession, describing his final confrontations with the Cat Man. The Cat Man returns, killing and skinning Weasel Plume, a white buffalo that Good Stab had reared from infancy. Good Stab eventually sacrifices a Pikuni girl in a gambit to destroy the Cat Man. Good Stab traps the monster, force-feeding the creature fish for four years. Eventually, the Cat Man becomes a sturgeon and will never return to human form.

Good Stab ends his confession and leaves. Beaucarne attempts to continue his duties as pastor. During a service, he has a breakdown in which he sees a vision of 173 dead Native Americans from the Marias Massacre. Beaucarne plans to walk into the prairie, hoping that Good Stab will kill and drain him. He hides his diary in the parsonage, where it will be discovered a century later.

The narrative returns to 2013. Etsy receives an unmarked letter. Good Stab visits Etsy; with him is a human-sized prairie dog. Good Stab reveals that the prairie dog is Arthur Beaucarne, turned into a vampire and forced to consume rodents until he took on their shape.

Etsy drives to Montana with Arthur. On January 23, the 173rd anniversary of the Marias Massacre, she reaches the location where it took place. A group of Blackfeet have gathered there to commemorate the atrocity. Etsy opens the letter, which is a confession written by Beaucarne detailing his role in the massacre. Etsy kills Arthur. Good Stab watches from below; he is revealed to be the worker who discovered the journal in the parsonage. He turns and follows a group of Blackfeet into the snow.

== Reception and awards ==
The novel received starred reviews from Booklist, Kirkus Reviews, Library Journal, Publishers Weekly.

Former President Barack Obama included The Buffalo Hunter Hunter on his reading list for summer 2025. Kirkus Reviews, Library Journal, and Shelf Awareness named it one of the best novels of the year. Locus named it one of the year's best horror novels. Time named it among their 100 must read books of 2025, while Publishers Weekly named it one of the top ten books of 2025, regardless of genre.

Kirkus Reviews called it a "century-spanning American gothic." The review states that the novel is a slow burn which ultimately pivots upon the Marias Massacre, a historical atrocity in which the United States Army murdered almost 200 Native Americans. The review concluded that the book is a "bloody reckoning with some of America’s most shameful history." In a review published in the Los Angeles Review of Books, Billy J. Stratton frames the novel as a "unique take on the story of an iconic monster’s insatiable taste for blood as an uncanny portal to the haunting specter of American genocide." Elaborating on the novel's unique rendering of the figure of a vampire, Stratton goes on to praise Jones's characterization of Good Stab as an unforgettable character who "retains the capacity to mourn deeply, as he screams thunderously and cries tears of blood in anguish at the unending abuses he seems helpless to stop."

Writing for NPR, author and critic Gabino Iglesias wrote that the novel was superior to any of Jones's other books, calling it the author's masterpiece. Iglesias praised the novel's prose, which alternates between the distinct voices of Arthur Beaucarne and Good Stab. The review stated that either character could have carried the narrative without the other, but Iglesias believes that the dichotomy between the two narrators allow the work to shine. The review praised the ways in which Jones tackles a bloody and difficult historical subject, writing that the author "has not only chronicled Blackfeet culture but also spoken through his characters against the flawed monolith known as 'the Native American experience.'"

The audiobook is narrated by Shane Ghostkeeper (voicing Good Stab), Marin Ireland (voicing Etsy Beaucarne), and Owen Teale (voicing Arthur Beaucarne). The audiobook received starred reviews from Booklist and Library Journal. Kirkus Reviews praised all three narrators, calling it a "dark, satisfying listen."

Year	Award	Category	Result	Ref.
2025	Bram Stoker Award	Novel	Won	
2025	Dragon Award	Horror Novel	Nominated	
2025	Goodreads Choice Award	Horror	Finalist	
2025	Los Angeles Times Book Prize	Fiction	Finalist	
2025	Los Angeles Times Book Prize	Science Fiction, Fantasy, and Speculative Fiction	Finalist	
2025	Nebula Award	Novel	Won	
2026	Audie Award	Horror	Won	
2026	British Fantasy Award	Horror Novel	Won	
2026	Ignyte Award	Outstanding Novel – Adult	Won	
2026	Locus Award	Horror Novel	Won	
