= Coffin Moon =

2025 novel by Keith Rosson

- First edition hardcover
- Author: Keith Rosson
- Cover artist: Aarushi Menon
- Language: English
- Genre: Horror fiction; crime fiction
- Publisher: Penguin Random House
- Publication date: September 9, 2025
- Publication place: United States
- Pages: 320
- ISBN: 9780593733400

Coffin Moon is a horror novel by American author Keith Rosson. It was published in the United States by Penguin Random House on September 9, 2025. It centers a bartender and his niece on a revenge quest against the vampire who killed their family. An audiobook narrated by Pete Cross was released concurrently with the hardbook and ebook editions.

== Background ==
The novel was inspired by True Grit. He wrote the novel in seven weeks while Fever House was being edited. The original draft was more of a road trip novel than the final product. In it, Duane was alone and ultimately met a young girl at a farmhouse, whose grandmother was killed by the same vampire that killed Duane's family. Rosson described it as a "pretty cold tale of revenge", and worked with his editor to infuse more emotional connection into it.

== Synopsis ==
In December 1975, just outside Portland, Oregon, newly-sober bartender Duane Minor suffers from PTSD from his time in the Vietnam War. He is managing to hold down his in-laws' bar, the Last Call Tavern, while he and his wife, Heidi, are trying to connect with Heidi's thirteen-year-old niece, Julia, who was sent to them after witnessing her now incarcerated mother murder her abusive stepfather. When Duane kicks out a biker gang dealing heroin from the bar, the leader of the gang, John Varley, retaliates by killing Heidi and her parents. Duane and Julia hit the road seeking vengeance, and on their quest learn that Varley is a hundred-year-old vampire.

== Reception ==
The novel was nominated for both an Audie Award and a Goodreads Choice Award for Horror.

The novel received positive reviews from critics. Kirkus Reviews called the novel "a pulpy, entertaining throwback". Jeremiah Paddock of Library Journal called it "a blood-soaked and bittersweet masterpiece." Publishers Weekly said that the novel "expertly balances action and character development to craft an edge of the seat thrill ride." The Irish Times praised the novel's pacing, its "compelling supernatural detail", and its "reservoirs of empathy that keep the novel surprising and affecting." In a Bluesky post, Stephen King called it the "[b]est modern vampire story ever".
