= Plainsong (disambiguation) =

Plainsong is a body of traditional songs used in the liturgies of the Roman Catholic Church.

Plainsong may also refer to:

== Music ==
- Plainsong (band), a musical group fronted by Iain Matthews
- "Plainsong" (song), track 1 of Disintegration, a 1989 album by the Cure
- "Plainsong", track 5 of Quique, a 1993 album by Seefeel

== Novels ==
- Plainsong, a 1990 novel by Deborah Grabien#Utopian_Fantasy Deborah Grabien
- Plainsong (novel), a 1999 novel by Kent Haruf
- The Fast Red Road, a 2000 novel by Stephen Graham Jones subtitled A Plainsong

== Other uses ==
- Plainsong, a 2004 TV movie starring Aidan Quinn
- Plainsong, home of the Utaru in Horizon Forbidden West (2022)
