= Earthdivers =

Comic book series by Stephen Graham Jones

- Cover of Earthdivers Volume 1
- Date: October 2022-April 2024
- Publisher: IDW Publishing

Creative team
- Writer: Stephen Graham Jones
- Artist: Davide Gianfelice
- Creator: Stephen Graham Jones

Earthdivers is a comic book series created by author Stephen Graham Jones and artist Davide Gianfelice. Published by IDW Publishing in 2022. The plot centers around Indigenous characters in a dystopian society who travel back in time to prevent an apocalypse. The comic is a historical science fiction horror thriller. It is considered as an Indigenous Futurism, as it contains sci-fi elements to rethink Indigenous pasts and futures.

== Plot summary ==
The story begins in the year 2112, in a future where environmental decline has significantly impacted the planet. Many wealthy individuals have left Earth but Indigenous people remain on the ruined land of Arizona. A group of Native Americans comes up with a plan to alter the course history and save the world from this state.

The novel follows Tad, a linguist who is chosen to travel back in time while posing as a sailor. His mission is to prevent the arrival of Christopher Columbus to the Americas from occurring, as the group believes this will stop the initiation of colonization and its long-lasting effects.

After joining Columbus' group, Tad attempts to adapt to life on the ship while still maintaining his cover. As the journey progresses, he encounters language barriers, dealing with suspicions, and the harsh conditions of traveling across the Atlantic. Upon his arrival to land, Tad successfully carries out his mission of killing Columbus before he reached the Americas. However, Tad's plan does not unfold as expected, as the state of the Earth has not dramatically changed. The novel concludes by suggesting that other forces ultimately contribute to colonization and that it would have ultimately been inevitable.

== Background ==
Earthdivers was created by Stephen Graham Jones, member of the Blackfeet Nation and a current professor at the University of Colorado Boulder. Jones has described his cultural heritage as essential to the story, which seeks to challenge traditional narratives taught about Christopher Columbus in schools, often of which are harmful and misleading.

The series is considered an Indigenous futurism and explores themes of decolonization, historical trauma, and Indigenous resilience. The title itself is meant to allude to the Earthdiver creation myth found in many Indigenous cultures. In the novel, he chose to make the characters represent various Indigenous tribes to reflect the collective Indigenous experience of surviving from the effects of colonizations.

== Meaning of "Earthdivers" ==
The title of the novel is based on the Earthdiver myth, a widely recognized creation story told by the Blackfeet and many other Indigenous tribes. The story starts with a Great Flood covering all the land on Earth. As a result, the Creator sent animals to dive down deep into the mud to help recreate the world. From this a humble hero emerged, showing that often small animals like the Muskrat, succeeding by diving and risking its life. In this series, Jones flips the script. Rather than having animals dive into the Earth, the character Tad dives into time to save humanity.

== Development ==
Stephen Graham Jones (Blackfeet Nation) envisioned the narrative of Earthdivers as being presented in the medium of a comic book due to the inherent visual nature of the material. Jones worked with artist Davide Gianfelice to create an example of a "second-goriest panel" of which he had written an instruction for using the example provided by Gianfelice. On August 28, 2022, it was announced by 20th Television that they were developing Earthdivers as a television series in collaboration with Dread Central.

== Design ==
In developing the design of the novel, Stephen Graham Jones referenced the opening page structure of All-Star Superman to introduce the story and establish the setting. The comic format was chosen because the story heavily relies on visual elements and being told through imagery. In terms of the design process with artist Davide Gianfelice, it was highly collaborative during all stages. Gianfelice would do the sketches for the comic series, making sure to include things such as clothing, hairstyles, body language to uniquely contribute to each character's development. Gianfelices' expressive artwork helps keep scenes engaging throughout the novel, even if they are focused on dialogue.

== Sequels and collections ==
The series has been collected into several volumes:

- Earthdivers Vol. 1: Kill Columbus
- Earthdivers Vol. 2: Ice and Fire: This volume follows a mother, Tawny, who travels back in time to find her lost children. She is transported to 20,000 BC, a time where Indigenous Paleo-Indians are at war with Solutreans.
- Earthdivers Vol. 3: 1776: This volume follows Emily (Seminole Nation), a two-spirit character, as she travels to the year 1776 to prevent the signing of the Declaration of Independence.
