= Zin E. Rocklyn =

American writer

- Occupation: Writer
- Writing career
- Pen name: teri.zin
- Genres: Horror, dark fantasy
- Notable work: Flowers for the Sea
- Notable awards: Shirley Jackson Award for Best Novella, Joseph S. Pulver Sr. Weird Fiction Award

Zin E. Rocklyn, also known as teri.zin, is an American novelist and horror fiction writer. She has won a Shirley Jackson Award, the Joseph S. Pulver Sr. Weird Fiction Award, was nominated for a Nebula Award, and was a finalist for two Ignyte Awards.

== Early life and education ==
Rocklyn is from Jersey City, New Jersey and is of Trinidadian descent.

== Career ==
Rocklyn's work has appeared under the pen name teri.zin and she writes primarily horror and dark fantasy. She has contributed short stories to anthologies and magazines including Nox Pareidolia, Sycorax's Daughters, Weird Luck Tales No. 7., Forever Vacancy, and Apex. Her nonfiction essay "My Genre Makes a Monster of Me" was included in Uncanny Magazine's Hugo Award-winning issue Disabled People Destroy Science Fiction.

In 2021 her story "The Night Sun" was a finalist for the Ignyte Award for Outstanding Novelette.

Flowers for the Sea received the 2021 Shirley Jackson Award for Best Novella and was nominated for the 2021 Nebula Award for Best Novella and was a finalist for the 2022 Ignyte Award for Outstanding Novella. It was selected for the 2021 Locus Recommended Reading List. The novella was reviewed positively by Becky Spratford in Library Journal, Gabino Iglesias in Locus and Jeremy Brett in Ancillary Review of Books,, while Publishers Weekly gave it a mixed review.

In 2022 she won the inaugural Joseph S. Pulver Sr. Weird Fiction Award (with Craig Lawrence Ginley).

Rocklyn is a 2017 VONA and 2018 Viable Paradise graduate and 2021 Clarion West Writers Workshop candidate.

== Awards and honors ==
Year	Award	Work	Result
2021	Nebula Award, Best Novella	Flowers for the Sea	Nominated
2021	Ignyte Award, Outstanding Novelette	"The Night Sun"	Nominated
2021	Shirley Jackson Award, Best Novella	Flowers for the Sea	Won
2022	Ignyte Award, Outstanding Novella	Flowers for the Sea	Finalist
2022	Joseph S. Pulver Sr. Weird Fiction Award		Won

== Bibliography ==
=== Novella ===
- Flowers for the Sea (2021), Tordotcom

=== Short fiction ===
- "Summer Skin" (2017), in Sycorax's Daughters, edited by Kinitra Brooks, Linda D. Addison and Susana M. Morris (Cedar Grove Publishing)
- "The Night Sun" (2020), Tor.com
- "Birds", reprinted in Apex Magazine, issue 141, November–December 2023

=== Nonfiction ===
- "My Genre Makes a Monster of Me" (2018), Uncanny Magazine, Disabled People Destroy Science Fiction special issue
