= Demon Theory =

2006 novel by Stephen Graham Jones

- First Edition Cover
- Author: Stephen Graham Jones
- Cover artist: Jacket design by Dorothy Carico Smith
- Language: English
- Publisher: MacAdam/Cage
- Publication date: April 27, 2006
- Publication place: United States
- Media type: Print (hardback & paperback)
- Pages: 439 pp (first edition, paperback)
- ISBN: 978-1-59692-216-7 (first edition, paperback)
- OCLC: 62878706
- Preceded by: Bleed Into Me
- Followed by: The Long Trial of Nolan Dugatti

Demon Theory is a novel written by Native American author Stephen Graham Jones. Written like a screenplay, it was published in 2006.

== Plot ==
Hale, a medical school student, visits home after a disturbing phone call from his mother. While there, he and his friends encounter dark forces beyond their control.

== Motifs ==
The novel/screenplay explores a long list of normal and bizarre subject matters, including demons, angels, gargoyles, familial dysfunction, guilt, trust, and sanity.

== Development ==
=== Publication history ===
The book was published by MacAdam/Cage in 2006.

== Reception ==
The book received somewhat positive reception upon release. Texas Monthly described the book as being "subversive and indispensable" and praised the structure. The Dallas Morning News noted the wide range of film references in the book but criticized the book for falling into familiar tropes. Chicago Reader was more critical, complimenting the intensity of the plot but criticizing the editing and the characters for being one-dimensional.
