= The Angel of Indian Lake =

2024 horror novel by Stephen Graham Jones

- Author: Stephen Graham Jones
- Audio read by: Isabella Star LaBlanc, Barbara Crampton, Angela Goethals, Andrew J. Robinson, Stephen Graham Jones, and Stephen King
- Language: English
- Series: The Indian Lake Trilogy #3
- Genre: Horror, suspense
- Publisher: Saga Press (US); Titan Books (UK)
- Publication date: March 26, 2024
- Publication place: United States; United Kingdom
- Media type: Print, ebook, audiobook
- Pages: 464 pp.
- ISBN: 9781668011669 (hardcover 1st ed.)
- OCLC: 1384410979
- Dewey Decimal: 813/.54
- Preceded by: Don't Fear the Reaper
- Website: Official website

The Angel of Indian Lake is a 2024 horror novel by Stephen Graham Jones. It is the final novel in his Indian Lake Trilogy and a direct sequel to Don't Fear the Reaper (2023).

== Plot ==
Four years after the previous novel, Jade Daniels is now a history teacher in Proofrock. The main narrative is interspersed with reports about Jade from Baker Solutions, a private investigative firm partly owned by Cinnamon Baker. These reports claim that Jade is destroying town property and is mentally unstable.

Terra Nova citizens are using a floating research station to map the underwater mining town of Henderson-Golding, which now lies beneath Indian Lake. Research equipment is repeatedly thrown off the research station, which damages the buildings underneath the lake and knocks a hole in the roof of the old church.

Teenagers begin seeing a mysterious woman dressed in a white gown, dubbed the Angel of Indian Lake. Two teenagers search for the remains of police officers killed by Dark Mill South. They find the bodies and are subsequently killed by an unseen entity. A man is decapitated in the school carpool line. Sheriff Banner Tompkins finds the bodies of the two officers. The widower of one officer starts a forest fire. This prevents outside authorities from arriving to investigate the carpool murder.

Jade goes to Terra Nova, where she finds several more bodies. Many of these corpses appear to be dead citizens who have risen from Indian Lake, but who have been subsequently killed. Jade reunites with Banner. Several Proofrockers attempt to cut down trees to stop the fire from spreading to Terra Nova; many are killed in chainsaw accidents. One member of the chainsaw brigade is revealed to be Tab Daniels, Jade's undead father who has returned from Indian Lake. Tab kills several people, including Banner. Letha arrives, killing Tab with her helicopter. Letha, Jade, and a group of survivors travel back to Proofrock, where they see that a Terra Nova citizen is staging a movie night for the town.

Letha and Jade arrive at the movie night. Many moviegoers are killed, both by bears and by an undead Proofrocker. Cinnamon Baker planned the massacre. All of the private investigative notes so far have been a false attempt to portray Jade as unstable. Cinnamon attacks Jade and Letha, but is killed.

Letha and Jade chase after Rexall, the school janitor and a known pedophile, who has carried Letha's daughter Adie away from the massacre. Believing that he has killed her daughter, Letha kills Rexall with a Halligan. She decides to turn herself in and returns to Proofrock.

Jade realizes that all of the evil in Proofrock is coming from Indian Lake. When a hole was broken into the roof of the underwater church, the song of its unholy choir was able to escape. This caused all of the dead people in the lake to resurrect. Jade sinks the research station into the underwater church, destroying it. Jade kills Ezekiel, the undead minister of the church, as he tries to rise from the lake. When the church cracked open, the voice of the trapped Stacey Graves was able to call out for her mother, the Angel of Indian Lake. When Stacey is freed from the destroyed church, she reunites with her mother. The Angel and Stacey leave Proofrock together.

In an epilogue, Jade rescues Adie. Jade can now walk across the surface of the lake, much like Stacey Graves.

== Major themes ==
According to the Los Angeles Review of Books, Jade's growth throughout the series is paralleled in her career. She was once a teenage misfit, but by the beginning of the third novel she has become a history teacher. She is a leader to a classroom full of teenagers who have survived two massacres, and Jade now occupies the same role as Mr. Holmes, her previous teacher and father figure.

The same review discusses the horror genre and its relationship with Indigenous people, commenting on its "meditations on who gets to be represented, how, and when — that these metatextual connections are not always necessary callbacks to well-trodden franchises for character development, setting, tone, and plot but often can be love letters with cutting criticism and teeth." One particular example of this phenomenon is Jade's inability to find many instances of Indigenous culture in classic horror films; the closest example is the opening scene from The Shining. The film's opening shots show fleeting scenes of Wild Goose Island in Glacier National Park, which is Indigenous Blackfeet territory. Jade notes that "It's maybe a weird thing to feel pride about, but the front of The Shining, that's the closest I’ve ever been to the homeland in my blood."

== Style ==
The style for The Angel of Indian Lake contrasts with the narrative styles for the first two novels. Jones states that Jade is the narrative focus of My Heart Is a Chainsaw, but she is not the actual narrator. Most of the novel is written in third person; the exceptions are Jade's "Slasher 101" essays, which are written from her point of view. The second novel contains many different point of view characters. The third novel focuses on Jade and is written primarily in first person. The Baker Solutions reports were written about Jade from an outside perspective, and Jones stated that "I had to somehow find a middle ground between how she speaks when she’s 25 and how she speaks now ... kind of intermingling with the Slasher 101 voice."

In reference to Jade's first-person narration, Robin Marx of Grimdark Magazine writes that "Jade’s mind runs a mile a minute, thoughts swirling with movie trivia, hopes, fears, assumptions, misinterpretations, and jumped-to conclusions. Her stream-of-consciousness perspective is sometimes a challenging one, as it’s occasionally difficult for the reader to distinguish actual events from flights of fancy, but the intimacy of her perspective enhances the experience."

== Background ==
In an interview with Paste, Jones stated that the initial ending for My Heart Is a Chainsaw included Jade's ability to walk on the lake. He eventually deleted this scene from the first novel. He reports that after listening to the audiobook for Don't Fear the Reaper, he realized that Jade never stepped into the water due to the lake being frozen for the entirety of the second book. Given this, he was able to revive the scene for the epilogue of The Angel of Indian Lake. He initially had planned to end the novel after the massacre and Cinnamon's death, but decided to extend the book and include Rexall's death as a way to "change things forever for Letha and Jade."

== Reception ==
Robin Marx of Grimdark Magazine praised the character of Jade. The review states:

Each of the books depends heavily on their nuanced portrayals of a misunderstood and neglected misfit that has a tendency to vehemently reject the few helping hands extended in her direction out of fear of betrayal. Misanthropic characters are difficult to get right, and are always at risk of being found frustrating or unlikable by readers, but Jade has always been rendered with such aching empathy that the audience can’t help but share her fears and see past the bulletproof shell she has constructed around herself. Jones describes her as the girl whose heart is too big for her body, and the success of the books (and popularity of “Jade Daniels is my Final Girl” T-shirts) has made it clear that she resonates with many readers.

Marx states that the supporting cast, particularly Banner and Letha, are also well-done. The review called the novel a satisfying conclusion to the trilogy and expected it to receive many awards nominations. A review in the Los Angeles Review of Books also praised Jade's characterization, writing that she "deserves to have her name added in blood to the pantheon of final girls, cinematic and literary."

In a starred review, Publishers Weekly called the novel "riotously entertaining" and "a worthy finale to a series that has expanded the horizons of contemporary horror." Library Journal also gave the novel a starred review, praising the character of Jade and the thematic material. The review calls the novel "both a violent, high-octane slasher and a frank, thought-provoking indictment of the U.S., past and present." Paula Guran of Locus praised the thematic content of the novel, writing that there is "layer upon layer here: past and current societal and personal injustices, the meaning of relationship and family, the role of the outsider and the traumatized, the nature of evil – both supernatural and human – and more." A review in Reactor Magazine compared the trilogy to the Blue Rose Trilogy by Peter Straub, in that both works are metafictional horror trilogies. This same review states that Jones had a difficult task because The Angel of Indian Lake needed to succeed both as a slasher story and as a commentary about slasher stories, and the reviewer felt that Jones succeeded on both fronts.

Lacy Baugher Milas of Paste praised the character of Jade and her emotional journey, stating that she reimagines "the very concept of what it means to be a Final Girl." Milas felt that the novel "mostly succeeds, although there are certainly moments where there’s so much going on ... the story can feel overwhelming and difficult to keep track of." Milas also states that "the book also offers little in the way of reminders or refreshers about the events that have come before." A review in Kirkus Reviews wrote that "how readers absorb this last volume ... depends largely on their appetite for the genre itself." The review praised the fast-paced writing but found the style to be confusing, stating that "while every word is carefully chosen, they’re not all in service of explaining what’s really happening."
