= Bat Eater and Other Names for Cora Zeng =

2025 novel by Kylie Lee Baker

- First edition American hardcover
- Author: Kylie Lee Baker
- Language: English
- Genre: Horror fiction
- Publisher: Mira Books
- Publication date: April 29, 2025
- Publication place: United States
- Pages: 304
- ISBN: 9780778368458

Bat Eater and Other Names for Cora Zeng is a horror novel by American author Kylie Lee Baker. It was published by Mira Books on April 29, 2025. An audiobook narrated by Natalie Naudus was released concurrently with the ebook and hardback editions. It is Baker's adult horror debut.

== Background ==
Baker was inspired to write the novel by the rise of anti-Asian racism at the onset of the COVID-19 pandemic. The folkloric elements were inspired by an image of a Chinese needle-neck ghost.

== Synopsis ==
In April 2020 New York City, twenty-four-year-old Chinese American Cora Zeng witnesses a white man push her older half-sister Delilah in front of a subway train after calling her a "bat eater". Months later, while working as a crime scene cleaner, women are murdered in Chinatown at an alarming frequency, with bats found near their corpses. Unsettling occurrences begin happening at Cora's apartment, such as food going missing from her fridge and bite marks in her coffee table. Her aunt warns her that she is haunted by a "hungry ghost", while her coworker Harvey believes she is haunted by a jiangshi.

== Reception ==
The novel was nominated for both an Audie Award and a Goodreads Choice Award for Horror. It was featured on the New York Times' 100 Notable Books of 2025 list.

Emily Vinci of Library Journal called the novel "frighten[ing] to the bone" and praised its "deftly illustrated trauma and paranoia", "aching prose", and "perfectly timed grim humor". Jaclyn Fulwood of Shelf Awareness called the novel "atmospheric" and "chilling" and praised its portrayal of anxiety, grief, and racism during the COVID-19 pandemic. In her review for Reactor, Lorna Wallace praised the novel for "brilliantly" blending real-world and supernatural horrors, and also praised Cora's newfound friends' "hilarious banter" and "genuinely heartfelt emotional support".
