= Don't Fear the Reaper (novel) =

2023 horror novel by Stephen Graham Jones

- Hardcover edition cover
- Author: Stephen Graham Jones
- Audio read by: Isabella Star LaBlanc; Jane Levy; Alexis Floyd; Pete Simonelli; Timothy Andrés Pabon; Marni Penning; Dan Bittner; Corey Brill; Matt Pittenger; Jesse Vilinsky; Migizi Pensoneau; Lee Osorio; Gail Shalan; Alejandro Antonio Ruiz
- Language: English
- Series: The Indian Lake Trilogy #2
- Genre: Horror, suspense
- Set in: Idaho
- Publisher: Saga Press (US); Titan Books (UK)
- Publication date: February 7, 2023
- Publication place: United States; United Kingdom
- Media type: Print, ebook, audiobook
- Pages: 457 pp
- ISBN: 9781982186593 (hardcover 1st ed.)
- OCLC: 1365390109
- Preceded by: My Heart Is a Chainsaw
- Followed by: The Angel of Indian Lake
- Website: Official website

Don't Fear the Reaper is a 2023 horror novel by American writer Stephen Graham Jones. It is the second novel in The Indian Lake Trilogy, following the 2021 novel My Heart Is a Chainsaw. The book received generally favorable reviews, and was nominated for several awards, including the Locus Award for Best Horror Novel, Bram Stoker Award for Best Novel, and a Shirley Jackson Award.

== Plot ==
Four years after the events of My Heart Is a Chainsaw, Jade Daniels is released from prison and returns to Proofrock. Sheriff Hardy shows her a white elk which has been wandering the town. Deputy Banner Tompkins is now married to Letha Mondragon. Letha, severely injured during the previous massacre, has spent the intervening years becoming an expert in slasher movies, believing that she could have stopped the killings. Meanwhile, convicted serial killer Dark Mill South is being transported through the area. During an intense blizzard, an avalanche strikes the prison convoy and kills most of the guards; South escapes.

Toby, a high school student, is lured out of a motel where he was having a tryst with classmate Gwen. Outside, he is eviscerated and dies. Cinnamon Baker, a high school senior and survivor of the previous massacre, calls 9-1-1. She claims that Toby was killed after they had met for sex in a car. (Note: The careful reader will note the differences between Cinnamon's account and the opening scene, which is told from a third person point of view focused on Toby.) Cinnamon also claims to have found Gwen disemboweled and hanging from a tree, blaming both deaths on South. Jade notes that the deaths sound similar to the opening scenes of the film Scream. Cinnamon is taken to the police station for her safety, but escapes.

Banner and Jade follow Cinnamon to a nearby retirement home, where Cinnamon's identical twin sister Ginger is a patient. Ginger tells Jade that she and her sister once found a blob of organic tissue under the town pier. Cinnamon apparently saw the blob grow into a young girl and disappear. Jade is unsure whether to believe this story. Jade finds three bodies, matching murder scenes from both Friday the 13th and Black Christmas. Concurrently, three students–Abby, Wynona and Jensen–sneak into the high school. Wynona is killed with a trophy, Abby is attacked with the lid of a toilet tank and Jensen is impaled on a mounted elk head (resembling a death in Silent Night, Deadly Night). Abby is able to call the police but later dies of her injuries.

Investigating the Terra Nova development, Jade and Letha encounter South, who has been hiding in one of the abandoned homes since his escape and therefore could not have committed the murders. The two women escape South but lose the key to their snowmobile and are forced to walk back to Proofrock. On the way they meet Claude Armitage, the high school's history teacher, who previously had an illicit relationship with Cinnamon. At the police station, Cinnamon explains that she had wanted the blob to kill certain Proofrock residents and for the murders to be blamed on Jade. "Cinnamon" inadvertently reveals herself to be a disguised Ginger and flees.

Jade finds one of the twins murdered on Main Street, assuming the dead twin is Cinnamon and that she was killed by Ginger. She investigates a local video store, finding most of the patrons inside dead via poisoned cupcakes, a reference to the film Happy Death Day. Since Jade has not seen Happy Death Day, which came out when she was in prison, she believes South killed all the video store victims. Jade is pursued by South, who in turn is confronted by the surviving twin for killing her sister. Kimmy Daniels, Jade's absentee mother, attacks South but is killed by the white elk, which is implied to be the blob that Ginger and Cinnamon found under the pier. The white elk is the vengeful spirit of Hardy's daughter Melanie, who drowned nearly thirty years prior.

Cinnamon tries to attack South again but is badly injured. It is implied she was the one committing the murders in retaliation for her classmates' spreading rumors about her relationship with Armitage. Cinnamon planned the murders to resemble slasher movies in order to frame Jade, only to decide that South was a more believable scapegoat. Banner hits South with a snowplow and drives it into the lake. Jade stabs South in the heart, finally killing him. The white elk tries and fails to gore Rexall, the school janitor. Rexall shoots the elk, which dissolves. Inside it is a version of Melanie, who is also slowly dissolving. Jade and Hardy both walk across the lake in order to put her spirit to rest. It is implied that Hardy decides to drown so he can reunite with his daughter.

When the authorities arrive, Jade takes responsibility for driving the snowplow into the lake so that Banner does not lose his job. Jade is arrested. Before being taken away by police helicopter, Jade holds South's prosthetic hook up in triumph.

== Development ==
For the setting, Stephen Graham Jones chose to set the story in Proofrock, Idaho, as he wanted to show that "there's not a single American Indian story" and that it does not have to be limited to areas they had lived or on reservations or to one specific idea of what it was like to be Native American. He also wanted the setting to feel like an authentic, genuine small town and drew upon his own experiences living in small towns while writing. In an interview with Barnes & Noble's Poured Over podcast Graham Jones stated that the trilogy as a whole will cover the process of Jade "coming of age" as he views the term as being "really kind of like a ritual that you go through to go to your next stage of maturation or just your next place. It doesn't even have to be higher just to the next place."

== Release ==
Don't Fear the Reaper was first released in hardback and ebook in the United States on February 7, 2023, through Gallery/Saga Press. A paperback edition released on September 26 of the same year, also through Gallery/Saga Press.

The audiobook has received a full cast recording and features Isabella Star LaBlanc as Jade Daniels; the character was previously voiced by Cara Gee for My Heart Is a Chainsaw. The rest of the cast is made up of Jane Levy, Alexis Floyd, Pete Simonelli, Timothy Andrés Pabon, Marni Penning, Dan Bittner, Corey Brill, Matt Pittenger, Jesse Vilinsky, Migizi Pensoneau, Lee Osorio, Gail Shalan, and Alejandro Antonio Ruiz.

== Reception ==
Critical reception for Don't Fear the Reaper has been favorable, as the work has received praise from outlets such as Cemetery Dance Publications and Tor.com. The Los Angeles Review of Books also reviewed the work, writing that "You don't need to have read Jones's previous works to enjoy Don't Fear the Reaper, but it helps. Reading Jones's works sheds light on the deep, palimpsestuous connections running throughout his career: popular culture and lowbrow slashers teaching strong, complex young women the skills and the How to Survive Male Predators mindset better than any traditional self-defense course."Audiofile praised the cast adaptation of the novel, highlighting LaBlanc's performance and stating "For what is essentially a slasher story about a hook-handed killer, the performances are filled with surprising heart."

== Awards ==
Year	Award	Category	Result	Ref.
2023	Bram Stoker Award	Novel	Finalist	
2023	Shirley Jackson Award	Novel	Finalist	
2024	British Fantasy Award	Horror Novel	Won	
2024	Locus Award	Horror Novel	Finalist	
