= Zombie Bake-Off =

2012 novel by Stephen Graham Jones

- Author: Stephen Graham Jones
- Language: English
- Genre: Horror; comedy
- Set in: Lubbock, Texas
- Publisher: Lazy Fascist Press
- Publication date: 27 Jan 2012
- Publication place: United States
- Pages: 242
- ISBN: 9781504096331

Zombie Bake-Off is a 2012 horror comedy novel by Stephen Graham Jones. The novel tells the story of a zombie outbreak at a local coliseum, which is hosting both a cooking festival and a professional wrestling event.

== Plot ==
Teenager Rex steals his father’s donut truck to smoke marijuana. While driving intoxicated, Rex strikes and kills a pedestrian. Rex and his friends panic and hide the body in the back of the vehicle. The next morning, Rex discovers that the body has disappeared. Unseen, a severed index finger contaminates some of the donuts.

That same day, a local coliseum is double-booked for both a televised cooking event and a professional wrestling event. The wrestlers arrive hours early and disrupt the cooking setup. The coliseum’s events coordinator, Terry, confronts wrestling manager Johnny T., who agrees to keep the wrestlers contained until the turnover time. The evening’s most anticipated fight is between two popular wrestlers, Xombie and Tiny Giant, whose showdown is the highlight of the night.

Rex’s father delivers donuts to the coliseum. Several wrestlers eat the contaminated pastries, transforming into zombies. They begin attacking their fellow wrestlers and then the cooking show attendees. Terry attempts to flee, only to discover that Johnny T. has locked the doors as part of a misguided promotional stunt. Trapped inside, Terry teams up with Xombie to search for a cell signal on the roof. Meanwhile, Terry’s brother Chapman, a security guard, pairs with Johnny T. to try to recover the door keys.

Terry and Xombie attempt to reach the roof but are blocked when the zombified wrestlers spill onto the arena floor, attacking the cooking show audience. Survivors include Terry, Xombie, Tiny Giant, and a blind chef named Beatrice. Elsewhere, Chapman and Johnny T. locate Walt, the staff member with the keys. Unfortunately, Walt has become a zombie, and they are forced to kill him. They fail to recover the keys from his body but manage to escape on a Zamboni.

The chaos escalates when a second generation of zombies appears. The slow, clumsy wrestler zombies were created from contaminated donuts. The second generation of zombies consists of soccer moms who were created through bites; they are faster and more intelligent. Chapman and Johnny T. return on the Zamboni to rescue the cooking show survivors. During the rescue, Chapman mistakenly kills a living woman whom he believes is a zombie. The guilt leaves him shaken.

Tiny Giant collapses, and Johnny T. tries to rouse him. Tiny Giant has turned into a zombie after unknowingly eating a contaminated cupcake. He kills Johnny T. before Xombie distracts him, buying time for Terry, Chapman, and Beatrice to continue toward the roof.

When the group reaches a ladder, Beatrice realizes she cannot climb it safely. She volunteers to remain behind, theorizing that the zombies are unable to smell her brains due to her damaged visual cortex. Terry and Chapman climb to a catwalk, where Chapman is seized by zombie soccer moms. Terry saves him by cutting down part of the catwalk, crushing Tiny Giant below. Chapman manages to place a call to 911. Haunted by visions of killing the innocent woman, he falls from the catwalk and is gravely injured.

Meanwhile, Xombie, Beatrice, and Terry regroup in a break room. They devise a plan to trick the zombies with fake brains, relying on Beatrice’s culinary skills. As Chapman lies dying, Xombie cracks open his skull to extract his brain, allowing Beatrice to sample it and reproduce the flavor. With her guidance, Terry cooks a brain-flavored liquid. Beatrice is killed by a zombie soccer mom; her death allows time for Terry and Xombie to spread the liquid. They are chased by a horde of soccer mom zombies, who run through the liquid and acquire the scent of brains. Tiny Giant smells the scent and turns on the horde, destroying them before turning his attention back to Terry and Xombie. In a final confrontation, Terry uses cooking oil, fire, and an exploding Zamboni to destroy Tiny Giant. Exhausted but alive, Terry and Xombie escape in the wrestlers’ tour bus, heading out to pick up Terry’s children from school.

In an epilogue, a truck arrives at a local prison with a hidden zombie in the back, suggesting the outbreak may continue.

== Reception ==
A review in Denver Post stated that "Stephen Graham Jones shows how to put a fresh spin on a classic dish." The review notes that "Jones doesn't pull any punches when it comes to describing the zombies’ relentless pursuit," indicating "an obvious love for this bloody branch of literature."

George Dunn of FanFiAddict described the novel as "absurd, bonkers, completely off its rocker ... something that only Stephen Graham Jones could pull off so brilliantly..." Dunn notes that Jones's prose is not "love at first read", but that he had "come to adore" the author's unique voice. Dunn recommended Zombie Bake-Off as a good starting point for readers unfamiliar with Jones's oeuvre. Dunn concluded his review by stating that "It’s gory, it’s chaotic and it’s so absurd that it loops back around to genius- it’s part horror, part comedy, and absolute carnage."

Writing for HorrorDNA, author and critic Gabino Iglesias gave the novel 3.5 out of a possible 5 stars. Iglesias noted that the zombie genre could get stale and repetitive, but that Jones's contribution was a "breath of remarkably fresh air... The book is what happens when an award-winning author flexes his muscles and decides to have fun with a genre while simultaneously eviscerating it." Iglesias praised the writing style, which has "an almost chameleonic quality that makes reading it a real pleasure." The review concluded by stating that "Stephen Graham Jones has created an action-packed literary pastry that packs a sugar rush you just have to experience."
