= Stephen Graham Jones =

Native American fiction author (born 1972)

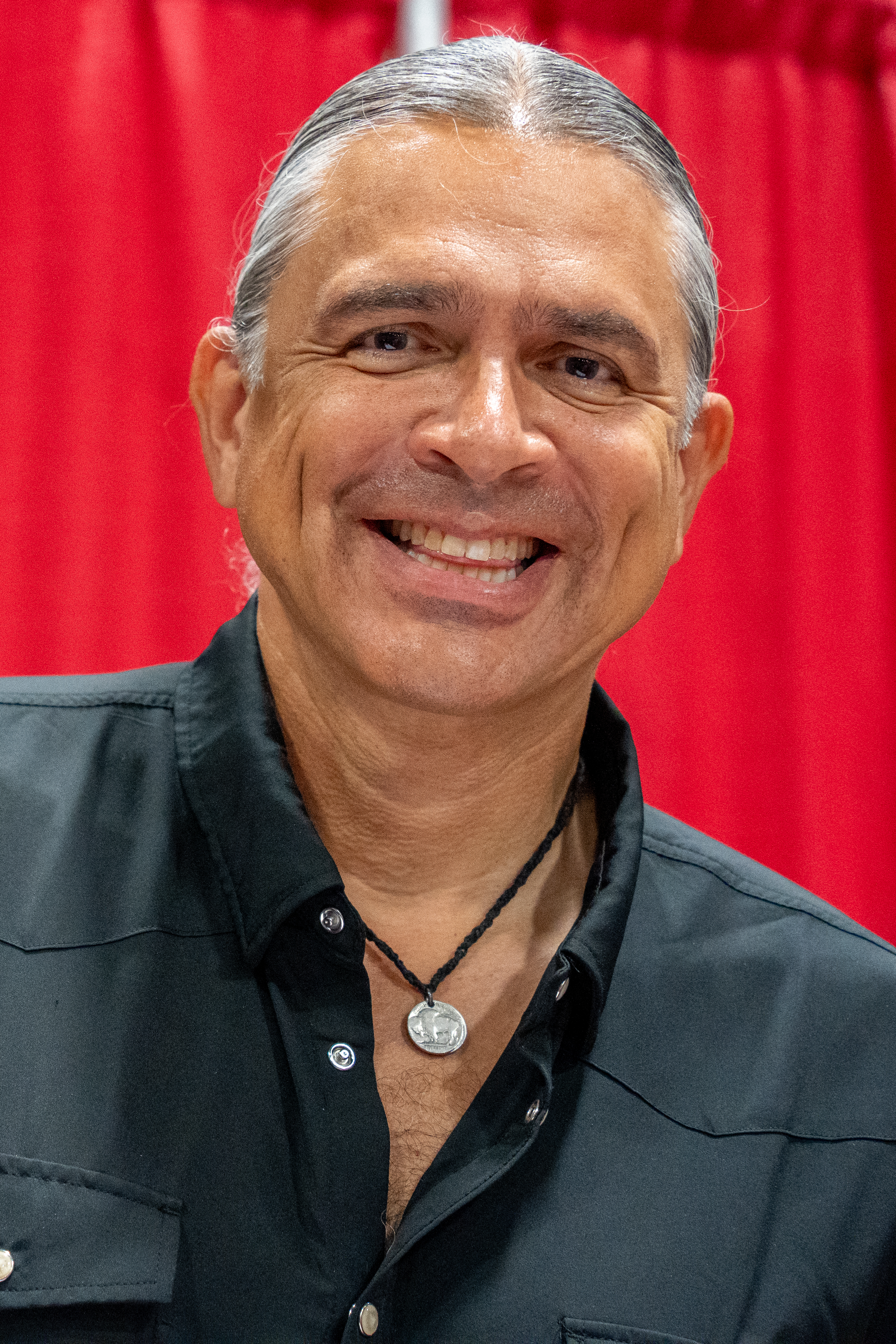
- Jones at the National Book Festival 2025
- Born: January 22, 1972 (age 54); Midland, Texas, U.S.
- Education: Texas Tech University (BA); University of North Texas (MA); Florida State University (PhD)
- Occupations: Writer, Ineva Baldwin Professor of English at University of Colorado Boulder
- Spouse: Nancy Jones
- Children: 2
- Writing career
- Genre: Horror fiction
- Notable works: The Only Good Indians; My Heart Is a Chainsaw; Night of the Mannequins; The Buffalo Hunter Hunter

Signature
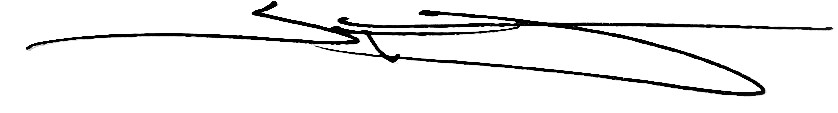

Stephen Graham Jones (born January 22, 1972) is an American author of experimental fiction, horror fiction, crime fiction, and science fiction. His works include the horror novels The Only Good Indians, My Heart Is a Chainsaw, and The Buffalo Hunter Hunter.

Jones is the Ineva Baldwin Professor of English at the University of Colorado Boulder where he has been a faculty member since 2008.

== Early life and education ==
Stephen Graham Jones was born in Midland, Texas, to Dennis Jones and Rebecca Graham. He is an enrolled member of the Blackfeet Tribe of the Blackfeet Indian Reservation of Montana.

Jones's enthusiasm for reading began at the early age of 11; however, as a child he had aspirations to be a farmer. After completing a semester of college, Jones decided to continue to pursue his degree while still having the intention to return to a manual labor job post-graduation.

Jones received his Bachelor of Arts in English and Philosophy from Texas Tech University in 1994, his Master of Arts in English from the University of North Texas in 1996, and his PhD from Florida State University in 1998.

After graduating with his PhD, Jones worked at a warehouse in Texas until a back injury forced him into a desk job. He worked at the Texas Tech Library until taking up teaching at Texas Tech University and West Texas A&M University.

== Writing career ==
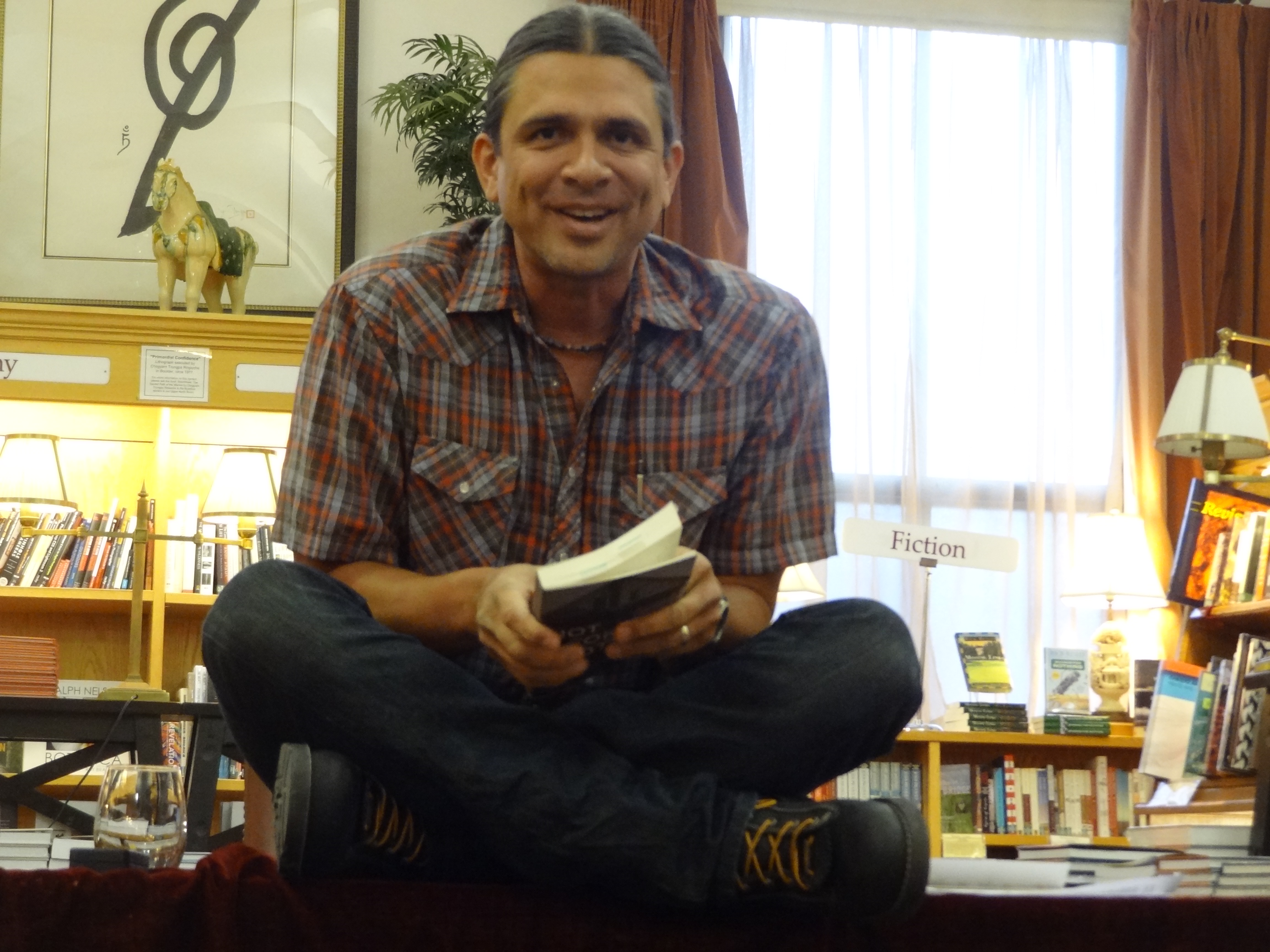
Jones at a 2014 book signing

While he was attending Florida State University, Jones's dissertation director introduced him to Houghton-Mifflin editor Jane Silver at the Writers' Harvest conference. Jones pitched her a novel which he had not yet written, and Silver liked the idea. Jones then wrote the book, The Fast Red Road, as his dissertation. It was published as his debut novel in 2000. It was followed by All the Beautiful Sinners in 2003.

In 2002, Jones won a National Endowment for the Arts fellowship in fiction. In 2006, he won the Jesse Jones Award for Fiction from the Texas Institute of Letters for his 2005 short story collection Bleed into Me. He won the Bram Stoker Award for Best Long Fiction for Mapping the Interior in 2017.

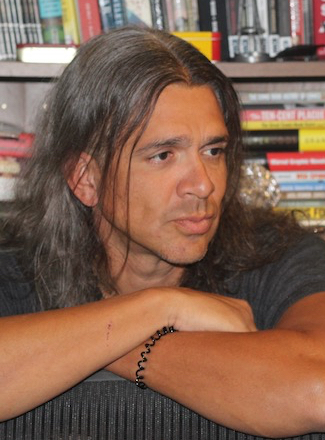
Jones in 2019

The Only Good Indians, a horror novel, was published on July 14, 2020, through Saga Press and Titan Books. It won the Ray Bradbury Prize for Science Fiction, Fantasy & Speculative Fiction in 2020. Jones won two 2020 Bram Stoker Awards for Night of the Mannequins and The Only Good Indians.

Jones contributed an X-Men story to Marvel Comics' Marvel's Voices: Indigenous Voices #1 anthology, released in November 2020, alongside artist David Cutler.

The Buffalo Hunter Hunter has won multiple notable awards, including the Bram Stoker Award for Best Novel, the Locus Award for Best Horror Novel, the Nebula Award for Best Novel, and the British Fantasy Award for Best Horror Novel.

In 2026, Jones received the Blackwell Prize in Writing from the University of West Georgia.

== Themes and style ==
Jones has acknowledged the influence of Native American Renaissance writers, especially Gerald Vizenor. Scholar Cathy Covell Waegner describes Jones's work as containing elements of "dark playfulness, narrative inventiveness, and genre mixture." Jones also cites the novels of Louis L'Amour as an influence on his development as a writer.

Joseph Gaudet describes Jones's writing as "post-ironic" and representative of David Foster Wallace's "New Sincerity", a literary approach "emerging in response to the cynicism, detachment, and alienation that many saw as defining the postmodern canon," seeking instead "to more patently embrace morality, sincerity, and an 'ethos of belief'. Gaudet uses Jones' eighth novel Ledfeather as his primary example.

Jones has said that he has an inclination towards the sentimental and speculates that the dark nature of his writing is an overcorrection on his part. Jones enjoys the constant escalation of the bizarre but uses humor to release building pressure in order to rebuild anticipation for the reader. Jones's novels have been described as Native American Gothic or Rez Gothic, a niche publishing genre characterized as using fantasy, science fiction, and horror to shed light on racial inequalities such as the one referenced through Jones's novel title The Only Good Indians.

== Personal life ==
Jones and his wife Nancy married on May 20, 1995. They have two children together.

Jones resides in Boulder, Colorado, with his wife and two children. He teaches at the University of Colorado Boulder where he is the Ineva Reilly Baldwin Endowed Chair. He has also taught at the Institute of American Indian Arts, University of California Riverside, and Clarion West. Jones returns to northern Montana in July to attend the Blackfeet Nation Pow Wow and in November for the annual Montana Blackfeet elk hunt. This annual elk hunt inspired Jones's novel The Only Good Indians.

== Works ==
=== Novels and novellas ===
- The Fast Red Road: A Plainsong. Fiction Collective 2. 2000. ISBN 9781573660884.
- All the Beautiful Sinners. Rugged Land. 2003. ISBN 9781590710081.
- The Bird Is Gone: A Manifesto. Fiction Collective 2. 2003. ISBN 9781573661096.
- Seven Spanish Angels. Dzanc. 2005. ASIN B005D7V6NA.
- Demon Theory. MacAdam/Cage. 2006. ISBN 9781596921641.
- The Long Trial of Nolan Dugatti. Chiasmus Press. 2008. ISBN 9780981502748.
- Ledfeather. Fiction Collective 2. 2008. ISBN 9781573661461.
- It Came from Del Rio. Trapdoor Books. 2010. ISBN 9781936500017.
- The Ones Who Got Away. Prime Books. 2011. ISBN 9781607013211.
- The Last Final Girl. Lazy Fascist Press. 2012. ISBN 9781621050513.
- Growing Up Dead in Texas. MP Publishing Ltd. 2012. ISBN 9781849821544.
- Zombie Bake-Off. Lazy Fascist. 2012. ISBN 9781621050193.
- The Least of My Scars. Broken River Books. 2013. ISBN 9781940885001.
- Flushboy. Dzanc Books. 2013. ISBN 9781938604171.
- Not for Nothing. Dzanc Books. 2014. ISBN 9781938604539.
- The Gospel of Z. Samhain. 2014. ISBN 9781619218116.
- My Hero. Hex Publishers. 2016. ISBN 9780998666709.
- Mongrels. HarperCollins Publishers. 2016. ISBN 9780062412690.
- Mapping the Interior. Tor Books. 2017. ISBN 9780765395108.
- Night of the Mannequins. Tor.com. 2020. ISBN 9781250752079.
- The Only Good Indians. Saga, Simon & Schuster. 2020. ISBN 9781982136451.
- The Indian Lake Trilogy
  - My Heart Is a Chainsaw. Saga Press, Simon & Schuster. 2021. ISBN 9781982137632.
  - Don't Fear the Reaper. Saga, Simon & Schuster. 2023. ISBN 9781982186593.
  - The Angel of Indian Lake. Saga, Simon & Schuster. 2024. ISBN 9781668011669.
- I Was a Teenage Slasher. Saga Press, Simon & Schuster. 2024. ISBN 9781668022245.
- The Buffalo Hunter Hunter. Saga Press, Simon & Schuster. 2025. ISBN 9781668075081.
- Killer on the Road/The Babysitter Lives. Saga Doubles, Simon & Schuster. 2025. ISBN 9781982167677.
- Off the Reservation. Saga Press, Simon & Schuster. 2026. ISBN 9781668225127.
- Ears. Saga Press, Simon & Schuster. 2027. ISBN 9781668279052.

=== Collections ===
- Bleed into Me: A Book of Stories. Native Storiers: A series of American Narratives. University of Nebraska Press. 2005. ISBN 9780803226050.
- Three Miles Past: Stories. Nightscape. 2013. ISBN 9781938644078.
- Zombie Sharks with Metal Teeth. Lazy Fascist. 2013. ISBN 9781621050995.
- After the People Lights Have Gone Off. Dark House Press. 2014. ISBN 9781940430256.
- States of Grace. SpringGun Press. 2014. ISBN 9780983221883.

=== Under the pseudonym P. T. Jones ===
- Jones, P. T.; Tremblay, Paul G. (2014). Floating Boy and the Girl Who Couldn't Fly. ChiTeen, ChiZine Publications. ISBN 9781771481731.

=== Short stories ===
- "Captain's Lament". Clarkesworld. No. 17. February 1, 2008.
- "How Billy Hanson Destroyed the Planet Earth, and Everyone on It". Juked. April 1, 2009.
- "Little Lambs". The Weird: A Compendium of Strange and Dark Stories, edited by Jeff VanderMeer and Ann VanderMeer, reprint edition. Tor Books. 2012. ISBN 978-0-7653-3362-9.
- Sterling City. Nightscape. May 18, 2013. ISBN 9781938644160.
- The Elvis Room. This is Horror. March 31, 2014. ISBN 9780957548152.
- "Brushdogs". Nightmare Magazine. No. 58. 2014.
- "The Backbone of the World". Amazon Original Stories. February 24, 2022. ASIN B09RQZZ9P8.
- "Men, Women, and Chainsaws". Tor.com. April 20, 2022. ISBN 978-1-250-85087-4.

=== Comics ===
- Earthdivers, no. 1–16 (October 2022–April 2024). IDW Publishing.
- "Dear Final Girls" (2019) art by Jolyon Yates, originally published in the Horror Special issue of Wicked Awesome tales edited by Todd Jones.
- Memorial Ride (2021) art by Maria Wolf. University of New Mexico Press. ISBN 978-0-8263-6323-7.

== Awards ==
Awards for Jones's writing
Year	Title	Award	Category	Result	Ref.
2008	The Long Trial of Nolan Dugatti	Shirley Jackson Award	Novella	Finalist	
2009	"Lonegan's Luck"	Shirley Jackson Award	Novelette	Finalist	
2010	The Ones That Got Away	Bram Stoker Award	Fiction Collection	Finalist	
2010	The Ones That Got Away	Shirley Jackson Award	Single-Author Collection	Finalist	
2014	After the People Lights Have Gone Off	Bram Stoker Award	Fiction Collection	Finalist	
2014	After the People Lights Have Gone Off	Shirley Jackson Award	Single-Author Collection	Finalist	
2016	"The Night Cyclist"	Shirley Jackson Award	Novelette	Finalist	
2016	Mongrels	Bram Stoker Award	Novel	Finalist	
2016	Mongrels	Shirley Jackson Award	Novel	Finalist	
2017	Mongrels	Locus Award	Horror Novel	Finalist	
2017	Mapping the Interior	Bram Stoker Award	Long Fiction	Won	
2017	Mapping the Interior	Shirley Jackson Award	Novella	Finalist	
2018	Mapping the Interior	World Fantasy Award	Novella	Finalist	
2020	Night of the Mannequins	Bram Stoker Award	Long Fiction	Won	
2020	Night of the Mannequins	Shirley Jackson Award	Novella	Won	
2020	The Only Good Indians	Bram Stoker Award	Novel	Won	
2020	The Only Good Indians	Goodreads Choice Award	Horror	Finalist	
2020	The Only Good Indians	Los Angeles Times Book Prize	Ray Bradbury Prize	Won	
2020	The Only Good Indians	Shirley Jackson Award	Novel	Won	
2021	The Only Good Indians	Alex Award	—	Won	
2021	The Only Good Indians	Audie Award	Thriller/Suspense	Finalist	
2021	The Only Good Indians	British Fantasy Award	Horror Novel	Finalist	
2021	The Only Good Indians	Dragon Award	Horror Novel	Nominated	
2021	The Only Good Indians	Ignyte Award	Adult Novel	Finalist	
2021	The Only Good Indians	Locus Award	Horror Novel	Finalist	
2021	The Only Good Indians	Mark Twain American Voice in Literature Award	—	Won	
2021	The Only Good Indians	World Fantasy Award	Novel	Finalist	
2021	"Wait for Night"	Locus Award	Short Story	Finalist	
2021	My Heart Is a Chainsaw	Bram Stoker Award	Novel	Won	
2021	My Heart Is a Chainsaw	Shirley Jackson Award	Novel	Won	
2022	My Heart Is a Chainsaw	British Fantasy Award	Horror Novel	Finalist	
2022	My Heart Is a Chainsaw	Dragon Award	Horror Novel	Nominated	
2022	My Heart Is a Chainsaw	Locus Award	Horror Novel	Won	
2023	"Men, Women, and Chainsaws"	Ignyte Award	Novelette	Finalist	
2023	Don't Fear the Reaper	Bram Stoker Award	Novel	Finalist	
2023	Don't Fear the Reaper	Shirley Jackson Award	Novel	Finalist	
2024	Don't Fear the Reaper	British Fantasy Award	Horror Novel	Won	
2024	Don't Fear the Reaper	Locus Award	Horror Novel	Finalist	
2024	I Was a Teenage Slasher	Bram Stoker Award	Novel	Finalist	
2025	The Angel of Indian Lake	Locus Award	Horror Novel	Finalist	
2025	"Parthenogenesis"	Ignyte Award	Short Story	Finalist	
2025	"Parthenogenesis"	Locus Award	Short Story	Finalist	
2025	The Buffalo Hunter Hunter	Bram Stoker Award	Novel	Won	
2025	The Buffalo Hunter Hunter	Dragon Award	Horror Novel	Nominated	
2025	The Buffalo Hunter Hunter	Goodreads Choice Awards	Horror	Finalist	
2025	The Buffalo Hunter Hunter	Los Angeles Times Book Prize	Fiction	Finalist	
2025	The Buffalo Hunter Hunter	Los Angeles Times Book Prize	Science Fiction, Fantasy & Speculative Fiction	Finalist	
2025	The Buffalo Hunter Hunter	Nebula Award	Novel	Won	
2026	The Buffalo Hunter Hunter	Audie Award	Horror	Won	
2026	The Buffalo Hunter Hunter	British Fantasy Award	Horror Novel	Won	
2026	The Buffalo Hunter Hunter	Igntye Award	Outstanding Novel – Adult	Won	
2026	The Buffalo Hunter Hunter	Locus Award	Horror Novel	Won	
