= LaToya Jordan =

American writer

- Education: Utica College (BS), Antioch University Los Angeles (MFA, 2009)
- Occupation: Writer
- Writing career
- Genres: Science fiction, fantasy, speculative fiction, magical realism
- Notable work: To the Woman in the Pink Hat
- Notable awards: Shirley Jackson Award for Best Novella.
- Website: https://latoyajordan.com/

LaToya Jordan is an American writer of fiction, poetry and essays from Brooklyn, New York City. Her novella To the Woman in the Pink Hat (2023), a work of feminist speculative fiction about reproductive rights, won the Shirley Jackson Award for Best Novella. Her short fiction has been selected for Best Small Fictions and Wigleaf's Top 50, and an essay was named notable in The Best American Essays.

== Early life and education ==
Jordan was born and raised in Brooklyn, New York City, where she continues to live. She holds a BS in public relations and journalism from Utica College (now Utica University) and an MFA in creative writing from Antioch University Los Angeles (2009).

== Career ==
Jordan's work often overs the themes of pregnancy, childbirth, and motherhood, frequently from the perspectives of Black women and girls. Her writing has appeared in Anomaly, Literary Mama, Poets & Writers, The Rumpus, Mobius: The Journal of Social Change, MiPOesias, Radius, Mom Egg Review, and Raising Mothers. Her essay "After Striking a Fixed Object", published in The Manifest-Station, was listed as a notable essay in The Best American Essays 2016. Her flash fiction story "Offering" was selected as a spotlight story in Best Small Fictions 2021 and named to Wigleaf's Top 50 Very Short Fictions of 2021.

In 2023 she was awarded the Shirley Jackson Award for Best Novella for her work, To the Woman in the Pink Hat. A work of speculative fiction, the story is set in 2040 and follows Jada Morris, a former leader of a movement against the theft of young women's uteruses, who is serving a sentence at an institution called The Center for Future Leaders. Reviewing it for 'Mom Egg Review' Teresa Tumminello Brader connects the work to the history of medical exploitation of Black women in the United States and says that it should be "yet another call to action for white women to interrogate and dismantle the white supremacy upholding racism."

Jordan is currently working on a speculative short story collection with elements of horror and magic realism from the perspectives of Black women and girls about motherhood.

== Awards and honors ==
Year	Award	Work	Result
2021	Spotlight story in Best Small Fictions 2021	Offering	
2021	Wigleaf’s Top 50 2021		
2023	Shirley Jackson Award for Best Novella	To the Woman in the Pink Hat	Won

== Bibliography ==
=== Novella ===
- To the Woman in the Pink Hat (2023), Aqueduct Press, Conversation Pieces vol. 87

=== Poetry ===
- Thick-Skinned Sugar (2015), chapbook, Finishing Line Press
- "Miss Missing" (2014), Radius, November 2014

=== Short fiction ===
- "Offering" (2020), flash fiction; reprinted in Best Small Fictions 2021 (Sonder Press)

=== Essays ===
- "After Striking a Fixed Object" (2015), The Manifest-Station
- "The Zig Zag Mother" (2019), in My Caesarean: Twenty-One Mothers on the C-Section Experience and After, edited by Amanda Fields and Rachel Moritz (The Experiment)
