= Shirley Jackson Award for Best Novella =

Literary award for works of dark fantasy and psychological suspense

- Awarded for: The best psychological suspense, horror, or dark fantastic novella of 17,500-39,999 words, published in English in the same calendar year
- Location: Massachusetts
- Country: United States
- Presented by: Readercon
- First award: 2007
- Most recent winner: Jordan Kurella (The Death of Mountains)
- Website: shirleyjacksonawards.org

The Shirley Jackson Award for Best Novella is a literary award given annually at Readercon as part of their Shirley Jackson Awards.

== Winners and Finalists ==
* Winners

Year	Author	Novel	Publisher	Ref.
2007	Lucius Shepard*	Vacancy	Subterranean Magazine #7	
2007	Zoran Živković	12 Collections	PS Publishing	
2007	Elizabeth Hand	Illyria	PS Publishing	
2007	Robert Edric	The Mermaids	PS Publishing	
2007	Laird Barron	"Procession of the Black Sloth"	The Imago Sequence and Other Stories, Night Shade Books	
2007	Conrad Williams	The Scalding Rooms	PS Publishing	
2008	Julia Leigh*	Disquiet	Penguin Books / Hamish Hamilton	
2008	Yōko Ogawa	"Dormitory"	The Diving Pool, Picador	
2008	Darrell Schweitzer	Living with the Dead	PS Publishing	
2008	Stephen Graham Jones	The Long Trial of Nolan Dugatti	Chiasmus	
2008	Stephen King	N.	Just After Sunset, Scribner	
2009	Nick Antosca*	Midnight Picnic	Word Riot	
2009	Quentin S. Crisp	Shrike	PS Publishing	
2009	Margo Lanagan	"Sea-Hearts"	X6	
2009	Joel Lane	The Witnesses Are Gone	PS Publishing	
2009	Sarah Pinborough	The Language of Dying	PS Publishing	
2009	Stephen Volk	Vardøger	Gray Friar	
2010	Laird Barron*	Tremendum	Occultation	
2010	Michael Byers	The Broken Man	PS Publishing	
2010	Nicholas Kaufmann	Chasing the Dragon	ChiZine	
2010	Joey Comeau	One Bloody Thing After Another	ECW Press	
2010	Peter Dubé	Subtle Bodies	Lethe Press	
2010	Tim Lebbon	The Thief of Broken Toys	ChiZine	
2011	Elizabeth Hand*	"Near Zennor"	A Book of Horrors, Jo Fletcher Books	
2011	Deborah Biancotti	"And the Dead Shall Outnumber the Living"	Ishtar	
2011	Michael Marano	"Displacement"	Stories from the Plague Years	
2011	Reggie Oliver	"A Child's Problem"	A Book of Horrors	
2011	Lucius Shepard	"Rose Street Attractors"	Ghosts by Gaslight	
2011	Tim Waggoner	The Men Upstairs	Delirium	
2012	Kaaron Warren*	"Sky"	Twelfth Planet Press	
2012	Ennis Drake	28 Teeth of Rage	Omnium Gatherum Media	
2012	Project Itoh	"The Indifference Engine"	The Future is Japanese	
2012	Jack Ketchum; Lucky McKee	I'm Not Sam	Sinister Grin	
2012	S. P. Miskowski	Delphine Dodd	Omnium Gatherum Media	
2013	Veronica Schanoes*	Burning Girls	Tor.com	
2013	Nicole Cushing	Children of No One	DarkFuse	
2013	Rosanne Rabinowitz	Helen's Story	PS Publishing	
2013	Mark Morris	It Sustains	Earthling Publications	
2013	Nina Allan	The Gateway	Stardust	
2013	Ramsey Campbell	The Last Revelation of Gla'aki	PS Publishing	
2013	Brian Hodge	Whom the Gods Would Destroy	DarkFuse	
2014	Daryl Gregory*	We Are All Completely Fine	Tachyon Publications	
2014	Kate Jonez	Ceremony of Flies	DarkFuse	
2014	Mary Rickert	"The Mothers of Voorhisville"	Tor.com	
2014	Robert Sharp	The Good Shabti	Jurassic London	
2014	Aliya Whiteley	The Beauty	Unsung Stories	
2015	Elizabeth Hand*	Wylding Hall	PS Publishing / Open Road Media	
2015	Nathan Ballingrud	The Visible Filth	This Is Horror	
2015	Lisa Mannetti	The Box Jumper	Smart Rhino	
2015	S.J. Spurrier	Unusual Concentrations	Self-published	
2015	Steve Rasnic Tem	In the Lovecraft Museum	PS Publishing	
2016	Victor LaValle*	The Ballad of Black Tom	Tor.com	
2016	Nina Allan	"Maggots"	Five Stories High	
2016	Nicole Cushing	The Sadist's Bible	01 Publishing	
2016	Brian Evenson	The Warren	Tor.com	
2016	Kij Johnson	The Dream-Quest of Vellitt Boe	Tor.com	
2016	S.P. Miskowski	Muscadines	Dunhams Manor	
2017	Lindsey Drager*	The Lost Daughter Collective	Dzanc Books	
2017	Samanta Schweblin*	Fever Dream	Riverhead Books	
2017	Stephen Graham Jones	Mapping the Interior	Tor.com	
2017	Margaret Killjoy	The Lamb Will Slaughter the Lion	Tor.com	
2017	James K. Morrow	The Asylum of Dr. Caligari	Tachyon Publications	
2017	Tade Thompson	The Murders of Molly Southbourne	Tor.com	
2018	Cristina Rivera Garza*	The Taiga Syndrome	Dorothy, a publishing project	
2018	Brooke Bolander	The Only Harmless Great Thing	Tor.com	
2018	John Hornor Jacobs	The Sea Dreams It Is the Sky	HarperCollins	
2018	D.A. Northwood	Judderman	Dead Ink	
2018	Jeremy C. Shipp	The Atrocities	Tor.com	
2019	Priya Sharma*	Ormeshadow	Tor.com	
2019	Kaaron Warren	Into Bones Like Oil	Meerkat Press	
2019	Joe Hill	"Late Returns"	Full Throttle	
2019	Jennifer Giesbrecht	"The Monster of Elenhaven"	Tor.com	
2019	Amal El-Mohtar; Max Gladstone	This Is How You Lose the Time War	Tor.com	
2020	Stephen Graham Jones*	Night of the Mannequins	Tor.com	
2020	Michael Bailey	"Agatha's Barn: A Carpenter's Farm Story"	Written Backwards 4/20	
2020	P. Djèlí Clark	Ring Shout	Tor.com	
2020	CJ Halbard	Her Mad Song	Man on Fire	
2020	Clancy McGilligan	History of an Executioner	Miami University Press	
2020	S.P. Miskowski	The Best of Both Worlds	Trepidatio	
2021	Zin E. Rocklyn*	Flowers for the Sea	Tor.com	
2021	Michael Bailey	A Rose / Arose	Written Backwards	
2021	Aaron Dries	Dirty Heads	Black T-Shirt	
2021	Catherynne M. Valente	Comfort Me with Apples	Tor.com	
2021	José Luis Zárate, author David Bowles, translator	The Route of Ice and Salt	Innsmouth Free Press	
2022	A.G. Slatter*	The Bone Lantern	PS Publishing	
2022	Deirdre Danklin	Catastrophe	Texas Review	
2022	Alma Katsu	The Wehrwolf	Amazon Original Stories	
2022	Tim McGregor	Lure	Tenebrous	
2022	Priya Sharma	Pomegranates	PS Publishing	
2022	Kelsea Yu	Bound Feet	Cemetery Gates	
2023	LaToya Jordan*	To the Woman in the Pink Hat	Aqueduct	
2023	Eugen Bacon	Broken Paradise	Luna Press Publishing	
2023	Roppotucha Greenberg	Getting by in Tligolian	Arachne	
2023	Cassandra Khaw	The Salt Grows Heavy	Tor Nightfire	
2023	J.A.W. McCarthy	Sleep Alone	Off Limits	
2023	Tiffany Morris	Green Fuse Burning	Stelliform	
2024	Eden Royce*	Hollow Tongue	Raw Dog Screaming Press	
2024	Sofia Ajram	Coup de Grâce	Titan Books	
2024	Christopher Barzak	A Voice Calling	Psychopomp	
2024	Nadia Bulkin	Red Skies in the Morning	Dim Shores	
2024	Will Ludwigsen	A Scout is Brave	Lethe Press	
2025	Jordan Kurella	The Death of Mountains	Lethe Press	
2025	A. G. Slatter	The Cold House	Titan Books	
2025	Michelle Tang	DuMort	Ghost Orchid Press	
2025	Jessica Lévai	The Glass Garden	Lanternfish Press	
2025	Eden Royce	Psychopomp & Circumstance	Tordotcom	
