= Killer on the Road/The Babysitter Lives =

Two novels by Stephen Graham Jones

- Cover art for the Saga Doubles edition of both novels
- Author: Stephen Graham Jones
- Language: English
- Genre: Horror
- Published: 15 Jul 2025 (Saga Doubles edition)
- Publisher: Gallery Publishing Group (Saga Doubles edition); Simon & Schuster Audio (The Babysitter Lives first edition)
- Publication place: United States
- Pages: 460 (paperback, combined page count)
- ISBN: 9781982167677

Killer on the Road/The Babysitter Lives is a set of two novels by Stephen Graham Jones, published in a single binding in 2025.

== Plot ==
=== Killer on the Road ===
In a prologue, a serial killer picks up a hitchhiker. He shoots off the man's finger, eats it, and then kills him.

As the main story begins, eighteen-year-old Harper lives with her mother and sister in Laramie, Wyoming. Her father, a long-haul trucker, disappeared three years prior. Harper runs away from home after a dispute with her mother. A pair of missionaries gives Harper water and sandwiches. Harper is later picked up by her friends, Kissy and Jam, her ex-boyfriend Dillon, and her little sister Meg.

Along the side of the road, they find the missionaries’ vehicle. A crow drops the man's skinned face onto their windshield; his body remains missing. They retrieve a bag from the trunk, which Harper assumes to be full of sandwiches. One missionary is paralyzed and missing an eyeball, but still breathing. The injured missionary's car rolls away before the group can stop it. They plan to call for help at the next available stop.

At a truck stop, they open the bag to find glass jars of severed body parts. Harper fears that they will be blamed if they're found with the evidence. The group tries to burn the bag, accidentally setting a trash can aflame. The fire spreads to a tanker truck, which explodes. Harper and her friends flee the scene, resolving that they can no longer report anything to the police.

Jam recounts the urban legend of Bucketmouth, a serial killer who can turn into a copy of his victims after eating a piece of their body. Kissy realizes that Jam is behaving oddly and accuses him of being an imposter. Jam stops the car and tosses Kissy in front of a semi truck, killing her. A series of confrontations ensues. Bucketmouth eventually destroys a rest stop, kidnaps Dillon, and drives away. Harper leaves Meg at the rest stop and pursues. She follows Bucketmouth to an abandoned gas station. Bucketmouth tells Harper about his past while holding Dillon hostage. Bucketmouth eats Dillon's finger. Harper begs him to let the original Dillon go free, but Bucketmouth states that there cannot be two identical Dillons in the world. He takes Dillon and flees.

Harper catches up to Bucketmouth, now driving a tow truck. Bucketmouth kills Dillon by dragging him from the tow truck arm, then drives off. Meg and Harper's mother arrive; Harper rejoins her family. Harper contacts Bucketmouth by CB radio. Harper leaves her mother and sister, meeting Bucketmouth in a tunnel under Highway 80. Bucketmouth appears, wearing the body of Harper's father, whom he killed three years prior. Bucketmouth uses this body to kill Harper's mother and kidnap Meg.

Harper offers to test and see if she is a shapeshifter as well. She and Bucketmouth each consume a human eyeball. She secretly feeds him the eyeball of the female missionary, who had been paralyzed after Bucketmouth attacked her. Bucketmouth also becomes paralyzed as he shifts into this new body. Harper thanks Bucketmouth for the closure of knowing what happened to her father. She snaps Bucketmouth's neck and runs to rescue Meg.

=== The Babysitter Lives ===
On the night before Halloween, sixteen-year-old Charlotte agrees to babysit the Wilbanks twins, Desi and Ronald. Mr. and Mrs. Wilbanks leave Charlotte with the children, promising to be back by midnight.

Ronald plays with a mysterious jack-in-the-box, which makes Charlotte uneasy. Desi and Ronald show Charlotte their “secret stairway”. They all enter a utility closet. Suddenly, Charlotte is transported to Desi's bedroom, inside a beanbag chair. Ronald tells Charlotte about an invisible woman who gave him the jack-in-the-box and who shows him the “funny places” that can be used for teleportation. The twins tell Charlotte to return through the beanbag portal; if she stays too long, she will “get stuck”. Suddenly, the doorbell rings. Charlotte walks downstairs and opens the door to find her girlfriend Murphy, dressed in an elaborate Halloween costume.

Murphy tells Charlotte that the house was the site of a famous crime. Eleven years ago, on the night before Halloween, Tad and Tia Spinell were drowned by their mother Nora. Nora then hanged herself in the home. The hanging decapitated Nora, whose skull was never found. Charlotte returns to the beanbag chair, but finds that the portal has closed. She attempts to leave through the front door, but finds that all the house's exits are blocked.

Murphy disappears into a secret passage. Charlotte sees a vision of Tia Spinel in the bathtub with her brother Tad. Tia murdered her brother by gouging out his eyes. Nora hanged herself out of grief. Charlotte also sees a different version of herself speaking to the twins. Charlotte realizes that, in failing to use the beanbag portal, she has become trapped on the “other side” of the house. The ghost of Tia Spinell now inhabits Charlotte's body. Charlotte learns that the version of Murphy who visited the house was not real; it was a vision created by Tia. Additionally, Tia created Ronald's jack-in-the-box using Nora's missing skull.

Charlotte begins to slip forwards and backwards in time, sometimes seeing events years in the past or weeks in the future. Her ghostly body begins to fall apart. She realizes that she can heal her ghostly wounds by touching brass, but she cannot interact with other real-world objects.

Mr. Spinell knocks on the door, still searching for Tia. Tia, in Charlotte's body, answers the door and invites him inside. Tia gouges out her father's eyes, killing him the same way she murdered her brother. Mr. Spinell's body falls through a portal and disappears. Charlotte's mother arrives at the Wilbanks home. Tia opens the door, still in Charlotte's body. While trying to protect her mother, Charlotte realizes that she can touch the jack-in-the-box. Charlotte's hand reaches through the box and pulls Tia to the “other side”.

Charlotte and Tia fight. Eventually, Charlotte gains the upper hand and throws Tia into a metaphysical bathtub; she disappears under the surface. Charlotte climbs into the beanbag chair and re-enters the real world. She finds the twins locked in the garage freezer. She brings them to the upstairs bathroom, warming them both in the tub. Both twins recover, and Charlotte puts them to bed.

The Wilbanks parents return home. Charlotte walks outside just as her mother arrives to pick her up. Charlotte's mother is killed when her car's seat turns into a jack-in-the-box spring. Charlotte realizes that she is still trapped by the house. Charlotte is sent back in time to begin the night again. As she knocks on the door to meet the Wilbanks family, she realizes that the door latch is made of brass, which could prove useful in the future. Charlotte's memories begin to fade, but she promises herself that this time the night will go differently and that she will escape.

== Publication History ==
The Babysitter Lives was originally published by Simon & Schuster Audio in 2022. In July 2025, both works were published together as a single book by Saga Press.

== Reception and awards ==
Writing for Locus, author and critic Gabino Iglesias stated that Jones "never writes the same novel twice" despite using similar tropes in different works. Several of the author's novels have included young women as protagonists, serial killers, Native American cultural influences, and criticism of stereotypes. These elements are present in Killer on the Road, but Iglesias stated that Jones has used them in new ways. According to the review, Jones has reinvented and revived the slasher genre. The same review stated that The Babysitter Lives is "a wildly entertaining take on the 'babysitter/someone's in the house' storyline." Iglesias praised the character of Charlotte, stating that Jones's is good at writing female characters. The review concluded by stating that "serial killer and babysitter stories have been done to death and it’s hard to put a new spin on them, but Jones does that here."

Matthew Jackson of Dread Central described the novels as "propulsive," stating that "[y]ou might know the direction you’re heading, and what you hope to find when you get there, but what happens in between is all up for grabs..." Jackson praised the character of Bucketmouth, writing that he is one of the scariest characters in Jones's bibliography. Jackson wrote that, while both novels feature young Indigenous women, the differences between the stories are proof that Jones is a versatile writer who can "pick apart subgenres with gleeful curiosity." Also writing for Dread Central, Josh Korngut reviewed The Babysitter Lives upon its initial release as an audiobook. The review rated the book four stars out of a possible five. Korngut praised the story for its mixture of young adult horror elements with "esoteric, worldview-disrupting elements of classic haunted house literature." The review further praised Jones for his subversion of expectations and the molding of traditional horror tropes into a unique story.

Kirkus Reviews called the novels a "palate cleanser" when compared to Jones's recent novel, The Buffalo Hunter Hunter. The review noted that the author's style is an "acquired taste" but concluded that the books are "bloody, terrifying, triumphant." Cheyenne MacDonald of Engadget praised the brutal cold open of Killer on the Road, calling that novel "gory, stressful, [and] horrifying-but-also-humorous..." The same review called The Babysitter Lives "brutal and chaotic", finding that both books were "fun to read."
