= The Bird Is Gone =

2003 novel by Stephen Graham Jones

The Bird Is Gone: A Manifesto
- First Edition Cover
- Author: Stephen Graham Jones
- Language: English
- Genre: Crime fiction
- Publisher: Fiction Collective Two
- Publication date: August 1, 2003
- Publication place: United States
- Media type: Print (hardcover & paperback)
- Pages: 175 pp (first edition paperback)
- ISBN: 9781573661096 (first edition paperback)
- Preceded by: All the Beautiful Sinners
- Followed by: Bleed into Me

The Bird Is Gone: A Manifesto is a murder mystery by Stephen Graham Jones. It was published in 2003 by Fiction Collective Two. The Bird Is Gone: A Manifesto is Jones's third novel.

== Awards ==
The novel won the Independent Publishers Award for Multicultural Fiction.
