= All the Beautiful Sinners =

2003 novel by Stephen Graham Jones

- First Edition Cover
- Author: Stephen Graham Jones
- Cover artist: HSU + Associates, Jason Fulford
- Language: English
- Genre: Novel
- Publisher: Rugged Land, LLC
- Publication date: April 8, 2003
- Publication place: United States
- Media type: Print (Hardcover, Paperback)
- Pages: 486 pp (first edition, hardback)
- ISBN: 1-59071-008-8
- OCLC: 51947703
- Dewey Decimal: 813/.6 22
- LC Class: PS3560.O5395 A78 2003
- Preceded by: The Fast Red Road: A Plainsong
- Followed by: The Bird is Gone: A Manifesto

All the Beautiful Sinners is a 2003 novel by Stephen Graham Jones.

== Characters ==
- Deputy Sheriff Jim Doe
- Special Agent Cody Mingus
- Special Agent Tim Creed
- Special Agent Shelia Watts
- The Tin Man
- Amos Pease
