= My Heart Is a Chainsaw =

2021 horror novel by Stephen Graham Jones

- First edition (UK)
- Author: Stephen Graham Jones
- Audio read by: Cara Gee
- Language: English
- Series: The Indian Lake Trilogy #1
- Genre: Horror, suspense
- Publisher: Saga Press (US); Titan Books (UK)
- Publication date: August 31, 2021 (US); September 7, 2021 (UK)
- Publication place: United States; United Kingdom
- Media type: Print, ebook, audiobook
- Pages: 416 pp
- ISBN: 9781982137632 (hardcover 1st ed.)
- OCLC: 1201300287
- Dewey Decimal: 813/.54
- LC Class: PS3560.O5395 M92 2021
- Followed by: Don't Fear the Reaper

My Heart Is a Chainsaw is a 2021 horror novel by Stephen Graham Jones and the first book in The Indian Lake Trilogy. The book is the winner of the 2021 Bram Stoker Award for Best Novel. It received critical praise for its references to, and deconstruction of, the slasher film genre.

== Plot ==
Two Dutch tourists are murdered while skinny-dipping in Indian Lake near the small town of Proofrock, Idaho. One of their phones remains in their canoe, unnoticed. Indian Lake is an artificial reservoir; the remains of a Christian settlement, including a church, lie beneath its surface. Local legend tells the story of Stacey Graves, a young Indian girl who was accused of witchcraft. Stacey cannot enter the waters of the lake because it is a Christian burial ground. Indian Lake abuts a national forest, which is being developed into a new neighborhood called Terra Nova by a group of wealthy businesspeople.

High school senior Jennifer “Jade” Daniels lives with her alcoholic father and is obsessed with slasher films. After a fight with her father, Jade attempts suicide by cutting her wrists and jumping into the canoe, imagining herself as Alice at the end of Friday the 13th. She is rescued and released from a psychiatric hold, and Sheriff Hardy returns her effects along with the Dutch tourists’ phone, assuming it to be Jade’s. Jade watches the video of the tourists' death and becomes convinced that a slasher is stalking the town, theorizing that the slasher will be dressed as Stacey Graves, the Lake Witch.

Jade fixates on her new classmate Letha Mondragon, whose father Theo is one of the wealthiest men in Terra Nova, believing that Letha will play the role of “final girl” in the slasher. She attempts to tell Letha about her theories through letters of her high school assignment papers dissecting horror movie tropes. However, Letha believes that Jade is having a mental health crisis and reports the incident to Hardy. Letha, Hardy and Jade's favorite teacher, Mr. Holmes attempt to stage an intervention, theorising that her father molested her due to an unelaborated anecdote where Jade had to go out of town for reportedly a stomach pump. They try to get her to admit it, but Jade and her absentee mother, who took her, both deny this. Jade tries to convince everyone that the killer will strike on Saturday during Proofrock’s Independence Day celebration. She runs away from home but is tackled and arrested by Hardy.

Mr. Holmes is injured when his ultralight plane crashes into Indian Lake. During the commotion, Jade escapes from Hardy's custody and explores the Terra Nova construction site, finding the body of a construction worker. She suspects that Theo shot down Mr. Holmes’s plane and killed the construction crew, who were witnesses. Letha invites Jade to stay on her yacht, and Jade accepts the opportunity to get close to Letha and hide from the police. The next morning, they are awoken to find that many of the other passengers have been brutally murdered. The girls escape the yacht and are pursued, presumably by Theo. They find the construction crew's corpses hidden in a pile of elk carcasses, which they use as a shelter to hide from the killer.

The next day, Letha and Jade sail across Indian Lake to where townspeople are sitting in their boats watching Jaws. Chaos breaks out as an unseen assailant begins a murder spree, and more people die accidentally in the ensuing chaos. Mr. Holmes suffers a head injury, and before he dies, Jade admits to him, and herself that her father had raped her, revealing that the out of town doctors visit was an abortion. Letha attacks Jade’s father, pushing him into the lake, but she is then attacked by the ghost of Stacey Graves, who rampages through the crowd, killing Theo and dozens of other residents. Jade pulls Stacey beneath the surface of the lake, causing Stacey to be dragged downwards by ghostly hands. Letha, who has survived the attack, rescues Jade. Lying in the canoe, Jade panics and attacks someone attempting to climb in, realizing that she has killed her father. Panicked and desperate, she escapes into the woods.

A fire breaks out in the forest. Jade adjusts the settings of the dam to raise the water level and save the town. As wildlife flee from the fire, Jade watches as a mother bear protect its cub from a male bear, relieved to see that some mother animals protect their young.

== Release ==
My Heart Is a Chainsaw was first published in the United States on August 31, 2021, in hardback and ebook formats through Gallery/Saga Press. An audiobook, narrated by Cara Gee, was released simultaneously through Simon & Schuster Audio. A paperback edition of the book was released on March 29, 2022.

== Major themes ==
According to a review for the Los Angeles Times, Jade's obsession with slasher movies is rooted in revenge and the idea of justice. Reviewer Noah Berlatsky states that killers such as a Michael Myers and Jason Voorhees can be read as metaphors for "the nightmares of an abused child", and that "if you’re a kid, grownups really do seem unfathomably powerful, perhaps unstoppably destructive". Jade explicitly draws a contrast between the slasher subgenre and the rape revenge subgenre. In the latter, the revengers are "often destroyed and debased by their own violence". According to Jade, a movie which "suggests that violence is senseless or that the strong target the weak simply because they can" does not deserve to be called a slasher.

A review for the Los Angeles Review of Books explores how Jade relates to the archetype of a final girl. Reviewer Kali Simmons states that Jade is unable to see herself as a final girl because "her own experiences of abuse, in her mind, preclude her from conforming to the Final Girl image of the pure and virginal maiden". The author notes that Jade chooses to ignore some of the regressive and troubling tropes of the horror genre, and that "Jade, unlike the reader, never manages to consciously comprehend how the [final girl] archetype’s repressive and at times unattainable standards can do more harm than good to young women". According to Simmons, a final girl who is left alone with a monster for too long will begin to take on some of the killer's properties, leading to a bloody confrontation. In this way, Jade undergoes a "devastating transformation". The review concludes that My Heart Is a Chainsaw contains both a "celebration of Finals Girls and a cautionary critique of unwavering fanaticism".

== Reception ==
Critical reception for the book was positive. Kirkus Reviews gave the novel a starred review, writing that it is "a magnum opus that has the power to send readers scrambling for more". Writing for NPR, author Gabino Iglesias called the novel "a deconstruction of slasher films that celebrates everything about them". Iglesias praised the novel for its inclusion of complex themes including "child abuse, alcoholism, discrimination, and gentrification" in addition to the horror elements. A review for The Washington Post praised Jade's characterization, including "[her] awkwardness and insecurities, her intractable obstinacy, her refusal to behave in a socially acceptable manner". The review found her to be a lovable protagonist. Rolling Stone praised My Heart Is a Chainsaw for being "both an homage to this trope and a big old “fuck you” to the concept that only good girls can prevail".

== Awards ==
| Year | Award | Category | Result | Ref. |
|---|---|---|---|---|
| 2021 | Bram Stoker Award | Novel | Won | |
| 2021 | Shirley Jackson Award | Novel | Won | |
| 2022 | British Fantasy Award | Horror Novel | Finalist | |
| 2022 | Dragon Award | Horror Novel | Nominated | |
| 2022 | Locus Award | Horror Novel | Won | |
