= Fever House =

2023 novel by Keith Rosson

- First edition hardcover
- Author: Keith Rosson
- Cover artist: Ella Laytham
- Language: English
- Genre: Horror fiction; crime fiction
- Publisher: Penguin Random House
- Publication date: August 15, 2023
- Publication place: United States
- Pages: 448
- ISBN: 9780593595763
- Followed by: The Devil by Name

Fever House is a crime horror novel by American author Keith Rosson. It was published on August 15, 2023 by Penguin Random House. The novel revolves around a struggle for a severed hand which induces madness in those within its proximity. The novel switches between multiple points-of-view and is interspersed with interrogation transcripts. A sequel titled The Devil by Name was released in 2024.

== Background ==
The first fifty pages were taken nearly verbatim from a previous unpublished novel, which had no supernatural elements. Rosson described Katherine Moriarty as "really hard to write", due to her trauma and Rosson's difficulty writing female characters. The novel was bought by Penguin Random House as a duology. It was Rosson's first work with a Big Five publisher.

== Synopsis ==
In Portland, Oregon, Hutch Holtz and his friend Tim Reed work as debt collectors for loan shark Peach Serrano. When they go after Wesley, a meth user who owes Serrano $12,000, their thoughts are invaded by a powerful aura that causes them to crave violence. They trace the aura to a withered hand that Wesley keeps in his freezer, and decide to deliver both the hand and Wesley to Don Senior, Serrano's second-in-command. This turns out to be a mistake, as proximity to the hand is revealed to cause madness, self-mutilation, and murderous instincts, and turns those killed in its presence into a zombie. Hutch hands the hand over to Nick Coffin, a young man working for Serrano and caring for his mother Katherine Moriarty, a former punk rock musician who has become agoraphobic after her husband's suicide. Meanwhile, a covert U.S. intelligence agency known as the ARC interrogates an angel named Saint Michael, whose psychic abilities could help locate the hand.

== Reception ==
Kirkus Reviews described the mythology as "a bit overstuffed", but called the novel a "fun to read indulgence" that "nicely" balances "familial devotion, big-screen apocalyptic visions, and full-throated splatterpunk." Jeremiah Paddock of Library Journal called it "a thrill-a-minute joyride that will keep readers guessing up to the final page." Publishers Weekly praised its "plausible, multidimensional characters". In his review for Reactor, Tobias Carroll called the novel "a panic attack of a book" that is "nearly impossible to put down." Ian Mond of Locus criticized its final third for grinding the narrative "to a screeching halt", but was "so enamoured" by the "shocking, visceral moments of violence and weirdness" of the first two thirds that he intended to read the sequel despite its ending. Stephen King praised the novel on X, writing "this is what reading for pleasure is all about." Liz Braswell listed it among the best science fiction and fantasy books of 2023, writing that it "subverts the ordinary devices of occult-themed fantasy and keeps readers in suspense until the last page".

== Sequel ==
A sequel titled The Devil by Name was released on September 10, 2024. It takes place five years after Fever House, where the world is overrun by the indiscriminately violent zombielike creatures known as the "fevered".
