= The Only Good Indians =

2020 horror novel by Stephen Graham Jones

- First edition
- Author: Stephen Graham Jones
- Genre: Horror
- Published: 2020 (Saga Press)
- Publisher: Saga Press, Titan books
- Publication date: July 14, 2020
- Publication place: United States
- Media type: Print (hardcover)
- Pages: 320 pages
- ISBN: 1982136456 First edition hardcover
- OCLC: 1196827160

The Only Good Indians is a 2020 horror novel by Stephen Graham Jones. It was written during a stay at a rented house in Colorado. It was first published on July 14, 2020, through Saga Press and Titan Books.

The novel centers on four members of the Blackfeet Nation, half of which have left their reservation. Ten years prior, the group pursued a herd of elk in the elder's section of the reservation. After the accidental killing of a pregnant elk and its fetus, they are hunted by the elk's vengeful spirit. After they are successfully killed, the elk's vendetta is redirected towards Denorah, the daughter of one of the four men, who must confront a past she was uninvolved in. The novel explores themes of culture, violence, and womanhood.

== Plot ==
A Blackfeet man named Ricky, who left his reservation to work in North Dakota, leaves a bar and finds an elk stumbling into several cars in the parking lot. Ricky attempts to chase off the elk and is caught outside with the damaged cars by white patrons. The patrons assume he has done the damage to the cars and chase him into a field where he sees a herd of elk. Ricky is beaten to death.

Lewis, Ricky's childhood friend, also moved off the reservation and married Peta, a white woman. One night, Lewis sees the image of a dead elk on the floor below and almost falls to his death, saved by Peta. Lewis shamefully recounts to Peta and his coworker Shaney, a Crow woman, an incident where Lewis, Ricky, and their friends Gabe and Cass went into the restricted elder's section of the reservation to shoot elk. Lewis shoots an injured doe several times before discovering she is pregnant. After burying the fetus, he commits to using every portion of the mother, but a game warden forces him to dispose of it.

Lewis and Peta's dog is found hanging by its tether in an apparent accident, still alive. They nurse the dog back to health, but find the dog stomped to death by someone wearing a pair of boots they own. Paranoid that the elk has returned for revenge, Lewis becomes suspicious of Shaney's behavior, convinced she is the embodiment of the elk spirit. He invites her over and engineers an accident with his motorcycle that kills her. Peta returns home and Lewis startles her, causing a fatal fall. He looks for proof that the women were elk, and, noticing that Peta appears to be pregnant, cuts her open. An elk calf emerges from her body. Lewis takes the calf, hoping to return it to the reservation and end the curse, but is killed by police en route. The elk spirit, seeking revenge on Lewis and his friends, slips away and assumes a rapidly aging human form. Now looking like a teenage girl, she hitchhikes to the reservation.

Cass and Gabe still live on the reservation. They prepare for a sweat lodge ceremony hosted by Cass. Gabe, now an alcoholic absentee father, stops to see his daughter Denorah before her basketball game later that day. Cass and Gabe begin the sweat with Nathan. While they are in the lodge, the elk spirit attacks Nathan's father Victor. Cass leaves the lodge and sees his girlfriend, Jo. She needs the money she and Cass have been saving in a thermos in his truck to visit her family after the death of her cousin, Shaney. Gabe leaves the lodge and finds Cass's dogs stomped to death. Thinking the dogs must have been trampled by horses, Gabe decides not to tell Cass and returns to the lodge, picking up an old thermos to use as a water scoop. However, Cass recognizes the thermos as the one he had left in his truck. Believing that Gabe stole the money, and finding his dogs dead outside, Cass starts a fight with Gabe. Gabe rocks a truck Cass is repairing off its cinder blocks, unaware that Jo is hiding underneath, killing her. Cass shoots at Gabe, but instead hits what appears to be Denorah. In guilt, he allows Gabe to beat him to death. Gabe discovers that Cass had actually shot Nathan, and they are approached by the elk spirit, who agrees to spare Denorah if Gabe kills himself. Gabe does, but she reveals that she plans to kill Denorah regardless, as Denorah is Gabe's "calf".

Denorah arrives and meets the elk spirit disguised as Shaney. She tells Denorah the men are out on the horses, and challenges her to an intense game of basketball. Eventually, the elk spirit is unable to hide due to her injuries, and transforms into an elk-headed figure with the body of a woman, pursuing Denorah through the reservation. Denorah encounters Nathan, wounded on one of the horses, and sends him back to alert her stepfather. She stumbles into the site of the elk massacre from her father's youth. The elk-headed woman catches up to her but becomes preoccupied with the site where Lewis buried her fetus. She digs into the soil and her calf emerges from the ground. Denorah's stepfather is revealed to be the game warden that interrupted her father's hunt, and arrives to save her, but Denorah stops him from killing the elk spirit and her calf, ending the cycle. The elk spirit sheds her humanity, and retreats into the wilderness as an elk again with her calf.

== Themes ==
=== Blackfeet culture ===
Stephen Graham Jones, a member of the Blackfeet Nation, uses his characters and his novel to pay tribute to Blackfeet culture, practices, and life on the reservation all while tackling themes such as leaving the reservation, marriage to a white woman, representation in sports, and addiction. Two of the largest themes are directly displayed on the novel cover; the title and the elk.

=== Title ===
The title of the novel references a significant theme of the novel, that being a recurring reference to the malicious invective “The only good Indian is a dead Indian.” This proverb has been in circulation within the United States since General Philip Sheridan’s first use of it in the 1860s. The phrase has been used across media and literature since, and through The Only Good Indians, Jones continues to address the use of such slurs against Native populations.

=== Elk ===
Another major theme is that of the elk. Many Native American Tribes, such as Shawnee, Cree, and Lakota, hold the elk in very high esteem. The elk is seen as a survivor and also a protector, playing key roles in stories of oral tradition, typically roles that present teaching opportunities. In this novel, the elk is not only a teacher, but an avenger; an entity that lives to make the characters atone for their wrongdoings.

=== Environmental fears ===
Carlos Tkacz asserts that this novel is a form of ecohorror: a genre of horror that contends with and responds to fears about Earth’s climate and environment. He writes that the novel deals with fears of environmental destruction and that Jones combines awareness of modern ecological issues with the history of violence against indigenous peoples.

=== Violence and womanhood ===
The novel also contends with the theme of womanhood and violence against indigenous women. The elk head woman loses her calf in the elk death scene and inhabits a human woman’s body for the second half of the novel. The scene where her calf is cut out of her body after her original death is similar to the scene where Lewis kills Peta and cuts the elk calf out of her corpse.

Denorah also follows a path that is similar to the "final girl" horror trope in the novel.

In this novel, the elk also occupies a similar role to the mythical figure of the Deer Woman that is present in many Indigenous cultures, who commonly acts as a symbol of fertility or a creature that leads men to their death by seducing them.

== Development ==
Jones stated that the idea for The Only Good Indians likely began to develop while he and his wife were renting a home in Gunbarrel, Colorado. He also believes that the genesis of the book may have been from an event in his childhood, where his uncle stopped him from hunting a mother grizzly bear.

The plot of The Only Good Indians revolves around the tragic events of a hunt years prior. Having participated in elk hunts on reservation lands since the age of 12, Jones drew from his personal experience to illustrate such an accurate and haunting situation. The core of the novel, however, comes from a time in which Jones moved from West Texas to Colorado. Jones could not transport the frozen elk meat he had left over from previous hunts, leaving him no option but to go door-to-door giving the elk meat away. Jones stated that he felt so poorly not knowing exactly what happened to the elk, thus not fulfilling his promise to himself or his wife to use the whole elk after the hunt.

Jones has noted that the novel was somewhat of a departure from his normal writings, a process that he enjoyed, and that the book "came in three parts". He found writing on hunting to be the biggest challenge as he can "fake it on cars and fake it on people, but I have to get it right for the hunters.”

== Release ==
The Only Good Indians was published in hardback and e-book formats on July 14, 2020, through Saga Press. An audiobook adaptation narrated by Shaun Taylor-Corbett was released simultaneously through Simon & Schuster Audio. The novel was also released in the United Kingdom through Titan Books on July 21, 2020.

== Reception ==
The novel received reviews from outlets such as The Washington Post and Los Angeles Times, the latter of which wrote that the novel "strains to weave a horror story with robust character studies. In the end, there is enough in each strand to appeal to both the genre fan and the literary reader, even if neither is fully reconciled to the other." NPR praised Jones as "one of the best writers working today regardless of genre" and stating that "Besides the creeping horror and gory poetry, The Only Good Indians does a lot in terms of illuminating Native American life from the inside, offering insights into how old traditions and modern living collide in contemporary life."

=== Accolades ===
Year	Award	Category	Result	Ref.
2020	Bram Stoker Award	Novel	Won	
2020	Goodreads Choice Awards	Horror	Finalist	
2020	Los Angeles Times Book Prize	Ray Bradbury Prize	Won	
2020	Shirley Jackson Award	Novel	Won	
2021	Alex Award	—	Won	
2021	Audie Award	Thriller/Suspense	Shortlisted	
2021	British Fantasy Award	Horror Novel	Finalist	
2021	Dragon Award	Horror Novel	Nominated	
2021	Ignyte Award	Adult Novel	Finalist	
2021	Locus Award	Horror Novel	Finalist	
2021	World Fantasy Award	Novel	Finalist	
