= Priya Sharma (author) =

British author of fantasy and horror (born 1971)

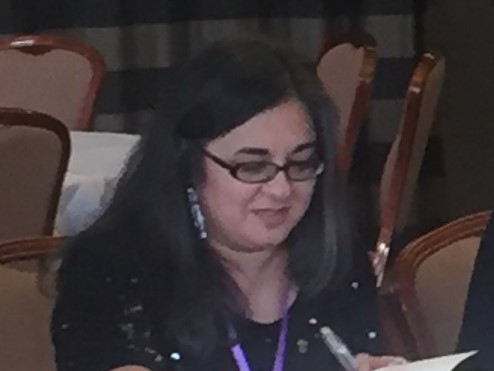
- Priya Sharma signing books at author event
- Born: 30 December 1971 (age 54); North West England
- Occupations: Short story writer, novelist
- Writing career
- Language: English
- Period: 2005–present
- Genres: Fantasy and horror
- Notable works: All the Fabulous Beasts (2018); Ormeshadow (2019)
- Website: priyasharmafiction.wordpress.com

Priya Sharma (born 30 December 1971) is a British fantasy and horror short story writer and novelist. Her works have won the British Fantasy Award, Shirley Jackson Award, and World Fantasy Award.

== Personal life ==
Sharma was born to an Indian father and an Anglo-Indian mother and grew up in North West England. She gained a Bachelor of Medicine, Bachelor of Surgery at medical school and works full-time as a general practitioner on the Wirral Peninsula.

== Awards and honors ==
Year	Work	Award	Category	Result	Ref.
2015	"Fabulous Beasts"	Shirley Jackson Award	Best Novelette	Nominee	
2016	"Fabulous Beasts"	British Fantasy Award	Best Short Fiction	Won	
2018	All the Fabulous Beasts	Shirley Jackson Award	Best Single-Author Collection	Won	
2019	All the Fabulous Beasts	British Fantasy Award	Best Collection	Won	
2019	All the Fabulous Beasts	Locus Award	Best Collection	Finalist	
2019	Ormeshadow	Shirley Jackson Award	Best Novella	Won	
2019	"A Son of the Sea"	British Fantasy Award	Best Short Fiction	Shortlisted	
2020	Ormeshadow	British Fantasy Award	Best Novella	Won	
2022	Ormeshadow	Grand Prix de l'Imaginaire	Foreign Short fiction	Finalist	
2022	Pomegranates	Shirley Jackson Award	Best Novella	Nominee	
2023	Pomegranates	British Fantasy Award	Best Novella	Shortlisted	
2023	Pomegranates	World Fantasy Award	Novella	Won	
2025	"The Witch's Pillowbook"	British Fantasy Award	Best Short Fiction	Shortlisted	

== Bibliography ==
=== Novellas ===
- Ormeshadow, 2019, Tor Books: ISBN 978-1-250-24144-3
- Pomegranates, 2022, PS Publishing: ISBN 978-1786368751

=== Collections ===
- All the Fabulous Beasts, 2018, Undertow Publications: ISBN 978-1-988964-02-7

=== Stories ===
- In the Garden, 2005
- Sweetpea, 2005
- Screaming Purple Psychosis, 2006
- The Englishman, 2006
- The Lady, Eve, 2007
- The Last Man in Africa, 2009
- The Indifferent Stars, 2009
- The Soul of Stones, 2009
- The Nature of Bees, 2010
- The Bitterness of Apples, 2010
- The Show, 2011
- The Virgin's Tears, 2011
- Lebkuchen, 2011
- The Fox Maiden, 2011
- The Orchid Hunters, 2011
- Fish Skins, 2012
- Pearls, 2012
- The Ballad of Boomtown, 2012
- Needlepoint, 2012
- Lady Dragon and the Netsuke Carver, 2012
- Rag and Bone, 2013, tor.com
- Thesea and Astaurius, 2013
- After Mary, 2013
- Egg, 2013
- The Sunflower Seed Man, 2013
- The Anatomist's Mnemonic, 2013
- The Rising Tide, 2014
- The Firebrand, 2014
- The Absent Shade, 2015
- The Red Vortex, 2015
- Fabulous Beasts, 2015, tor.com
- Blonde, 2015
- Grave Goods, 2016
- Inheritance, or The Ruby Tear, 2016
- The Crow Palace, 2017
- Mercury, 2017
- A Son of the Sea, 2018
- Small Town Stories, 2018
- Maw, 2018
- My Mother's Ghosts, 2019
- Feral, 2020
- Mari Lwyd, 2021
- The Beechfield Miracles, 2021
- Papa Eye, 2022
- Tales from Alexandria, 2022
- The Ghost of a Flea, 2022
- A Short History of My Mother, 2022
