= Keith Rosson =

American author and graphic designer (born 1976)

- Born: April 12, 1976 (age 50)
- Occupations: Novelist; short story writer; illustrator; graphic designer
- Children: 2
- Writing career
- Years active: 1995–present
- Genres: Crime fiction; Horror fiction
- Website: keithrosson.com

Keith Rosson (born April 12, 1976) is an American author, illustrator, and graphic designer. His fiction includes both novels and short stories, and blends horror and crime. His graphic design and illustration work includes cover art for books and punk rock albums. He created the punk fanzine Avow in 1995.

== Life and education ==
Keith Rosson was born on April 12, 1976. He was born with optic nerve hypoplasia, which has left him with a peripheral vision of 25 degrees with both eyes combined, rendering him legally blind. He did not realize the severity of his visual impairment until he was ten or eleven. He grew up reading comic books and drawing every day, and discovered punk music at the age of thirteen. He has dropped out of art school twice. He first studied to a fine arts school, and later studied graphic design. He lives in Portland, Oregon with his partner and two children.

== Career ==
In 1995, Rosson created the Avow punk rock fanzine while he was in art school in Seattle. It started off by merging punk rock content with poetry, but the poetry was gradually phased out until issue eleven, when it was entirely made up of his own art and creative nonfiction work.

Starting in 2007, Rosson has been writing short stories. His short stories have been published in various magazines, journals, and anthologies, including Reactor, Southwest Review, and Camera Obscura. His 2016 short story "Forgive Me This" was shortlisted for the Birdwhistle Prize for Short Fiction. In 2021, he reprinted many of his short stories in Folk Songs for Trauma Surgeons. It won a Shirley Jackson Award for Best Single-Author Collection.

In 2017, Rosson published his debut novel The Mercy of the Tide with the independent publishing house Meerkat Press. His following novels, Smoke City and Road Seven, were also published by Meerkat Press. In 2023, Fever House was published by Penguin Random House, making it his first book published by a major publishing house. A sequel to Fever House, titled The Devil by Name, was released the following year. His latest novel, Coffin Moon, was published in 2025. His next novel, Crone, is set for release in 2026. His writing incorporates elements of both horror and crime. His influences include Watchers, Swan Song, and the early works of Stephen King. Stephen King has praised his novels.

Rosson is also an illustrator and graphic designer. His work as an illustrator for punk album covers began when he was "maybe twenty", when he sent a batch of illustrations to a Canadian punk band called Submission Hold and ended up doing the illustrations for all of their albums. His biggest inspirations on his illustration and graphic design work include the punk graphic artist Pushead and comic book artists like Bill Sienkiewicz and Jae Lee. He is also inspired by the angularity and figure work of Egon Schiele and Gustav Klimt. His clients include Green Day, Against Me!, and Warner Bros. Records. He also designs book covers, including covers for his own books published by Meerkat Press, as well as for John McNally's The Fear of Everything and a reissue of Kathe Koja's The Cipher.

Rosson was a member of a punk band called Neckties Make Me Nervous. While he enjoyed writing lyrics, he describes himself as "a horrible guitarist".

== Bibliography ==
=== Novels ===
- The Mercy of the Tide. Meerkat Press. 2017. ISBN 9780996626248.
- Smoke City. Meerkat Press. 2018. ISBN 9781946154163.
- Road Seven. Meerkat Press. 2020. ISBN 9781946154293.
- Fever House. Penguin Random House. 2023. ISBN 9780593595763.
- The Devil by Name. Penguin Random House. 2024. ISBN 9780593595787.
- Coffin Moon. Penguin Random House. 2025. ISBN 9780593733400.
- Crone. Penguin Random House. 2026. ISBN 978-0-593-73343-1

=== Short stories ===
- "Apes Of the Sea". Reactor. 2007.
- "Time Carves Off the Limbs". Ne'er Do Well Magazine #1. 2009.
- "Small Words Given Freely". Avow #23. 2009.
- "There Is No Mechanism at Work Here". Avow #23. 2009.
- "Trajectories". Avow #23. 2009.
- "Do It for Hannah". Avow #23. 2009.
- "The Porch". Abort! #33. 2010.
- "At This Table". Pank Magazine. 2010.
- "Droppers". Murky Depths #14. 2010.
- "The Kind of People That Drive These Roads". Burnt Bridge. 2011.
- "Homesteaders". Title Goes Here. 2012.
- "Coyote". The Nervous Breakdown. 2012.
- "Shrub Angel". Menda City Review. 2012.
- "High Tide". Northwind. 2012.
- "Hospitality". Camera Obscura Journal. 2012.
- "All That Business with the Heart". Blue Earth Review. 2013.
- "The Things That Perish Along the Way". Stupefying Stories: The 2nd Annual Horror Special. 2013.
- "Winter, Spring, Whatever Happens After That". Gulf Stream. 2013.
- "Baby Jill". Cream City Review #38. 2014.
- "The Lesser Horsemen". Redivider 12.2. 2015.
- "Gifts". Rivet Journal. 2016.
- "Yes, We Are Duly Concerned with Calamitous Events". Phantom Drift #6. 2016.
- "Forgive Me This". Noble / Gas Qtrly. 2016.
- "Dunsmuir". December Vol. 27.2. 2016.
- "Torch Songs". Behind the Mask. 2017.
- "Weight". Pioneertown Lit. 2017.
- "War Songs". Bridge Eight. 2019.
- "Brad Benske and the Hand of Light". Outlook Springs #6. 2019.
- "Their Souls Climb the Room". Ink Heist. 2020.
- "You Are My Sunshine". Black Static #73. 2020.
- "This World or the Next". Aggregate #1. 2020.
- "Homecoming". Phantom Drift #9. 2020.
- "Devils Abound". Ink Heist. 2021.
- "Diminishments". Southwest Review Vol. 106 No. 3. 2021.
- "Vigilance". Under the Thumb: Stories of Police Oppression. 2021.
- "The Book of Veils". Antifa Splatterpunk. 2022.
- "Primal Slap". Nightmare Magazine No. 128. 2023.
- "Second Deaths". Nightmare Magazine No. 138. 2024.
- "Animals, Convincing". Nightmare Diaries. 2025.

=== Short story collection ===
- Folk Songs for Trauma Surgeons. Meerkat Press. 2021. ISBN 9781946154521.
