= Ormeshadow =

2019 novella by Priya Sharma

- Author: Priya Sharma
- Cover artist: Henry Sene Yes
- Language: English
- Set in: Ormeshadow, England
- Publisher: Tor Books
- Publication date: 15 October 2019
- Publication place: United Kingdom
- Pages: 176 (first edition)
- ISBN: 9781250241443

Ormeshadow is a 2019 novella by Priya Sharma. The novella won both the 2019 Shirley Jackson Award and the 2020 British Fantasy Award in the novella category.

== Plot ==
Seven-year-old Gideon Belman and his parents, John and Clare, leave Bath for the town of Ormeshadow. John has lost his job and returns to the family sheep farm, joining his brother Thomas and extended family. The farm abuts the Orme, a large hill that is said to be the body of a sleeping dragon. John tells Gideon stories about the Orme and the Belman ancestors, who promised to look after the dragon until it was ready to awaken.

As Gideon grows older, he settles into life on the farm and its petty familial conflicts. Thomas resents his brother for being more educated; John regrets losing his prestigious job. Gideon overhears his parents fighting; Thomas and Clare have had an affair. John leaves the farm, leaving his wedding ring behind. He later commits suicide. A local fisherman named Ambrose finds John's body on the rocks at the foot of the Orme. John bequeathes most of his possessions to Clare, but leaves the Orme directly to Gideon. Gideon leaves John's wedding ring in a cave beneath the Orme. He begins to visit the hill regularly.

As Gideon grows, Thomas and Gideon's male cousins become progressively more physically and emotionally abusive. Clare hates her life at the farm, especially when Thomas's wife Maud becomes pregnant again and Clare is forced to bear a larger share of the workload. Nonetheless, she turns down a marriage proposal from local lawyer Henry Hipps. Gideon accidentally witnesses Thomas and Clare having sex. He flees to the Orme. The sleeping dragon, listening to Gideon cry and talk of his family, finally awakens. The dragon rips free from the hill, causing a landslide. She burns the town of Ormeshadow and Gideon's family farm, killing all of Gideon's family members and numerous other villagers.

Ambrose rescues Gideon from the ruins of the Orme, years after finding John Belman's body in the same location. Gideon finds the dragon's hoard and becomes immediately wealthy, but feels that the cost was far too high. Gideon goes to live with Mr. Hipps, and the novella ends with Gideon telling him stories about the dragon.

== Reception and awards ==
Em Nordling of Reactor praised the combination of stark realism and brooding mythology, calling the novella "the perfect autumnal read". Nordling compared the novel to the works of both Thomas Hardy and Ursula K. Le Guin. The temporal setting is intentionally ambiguous, leading the reader to conclude that the novella takes place sometime in the 18th or 19th centuries. Nordling felt that this was a strength, as the "lack of fixation in time also unsettles the reader, taking them to conceptual, almost mythic proportions despite the novella’s realistic prose and circumstances." The review acknowledged the abrupt ending, which may be off-putting for some readers. Nordling stated that "I was thrown off by it, but in a way that made me flip to the front and re-read the first chapter." Publishers Weekly wrote that the novella "reads like an old-fashioned idyll of rural life in Georgian England", but contrasted this premise with the work's dark thematic material. The review concluded that the "short, sharp tale is often wrenching and worth savoring."

Kirkus Reviews wrote that the premise of an orphan boy has been used by authors from Charles Dickens to J.K. Rowling, but that Sharma's "combination of dragons and sorrow set against a brutal country backdrop separates itself from the pack". The review criticized the novella's conclusion as "unsatisfying" but stated that its "imagery and emotion make it worth the effort".

Phoenix Scholz of Strange Horizons felt that the novella was a disappointment. The review particularly criticized the novella's treatment of women, stating that "women are presented as competitors over men’s affection, rather than siding with each other in solidarity..." Scholz concluded that the book is "worse that apolitical: it is grimdark for no reason, escapist without offering any other escape than that given by a lumpen deus ex machina, ending with an overdose of poetic justice, and, as if this wasn’t enough, is antifeminist to the max."

Awards and honors for Ormeshadow
Year	Award	Category	Result	Ref.
2019	Shirley Jackson Award	Novella	Won	
2020	British Fantasy Award	Novella	Won	
2022	Grand Prix de l'Imaginaire	Foreign Short fiction	Finalist	
