= Ghostkeeper (band) =

Canadian experimental pop/rock band

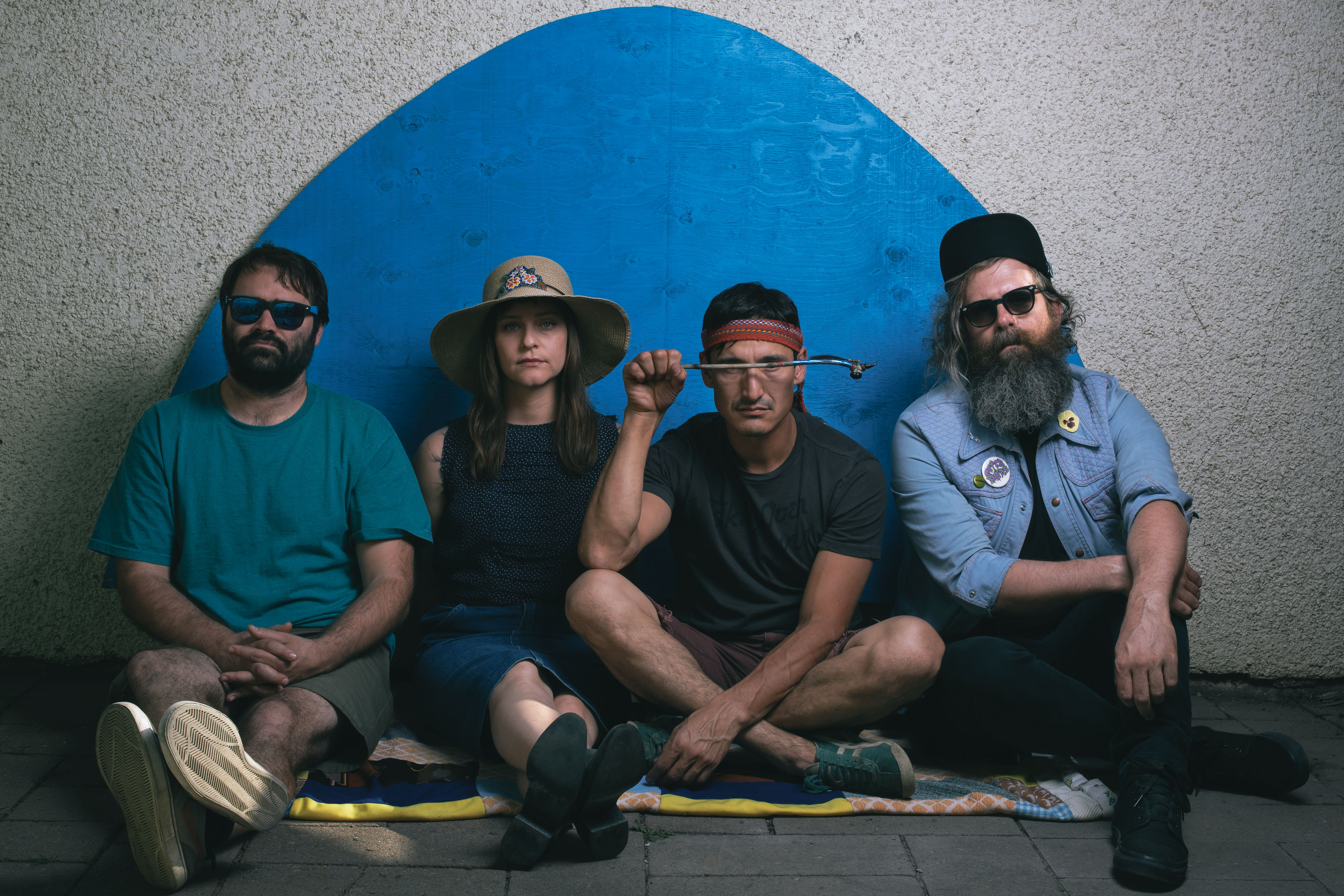
- Ghostkeeper in 2016

Background information
- Origin: Calgary, Alberta, Canada
- Genres: Pop; Psychedelic/Rock'n'roll
- Years active: 2008–present
- Labels: Flemish Eye (Canada); Saved by Radio
- Members: Shane Ghostkeeper; Sarah Houle; Ryan Bourne; Eric Hamelin
- Past members: Scott Monro; Jay Crocker; Ian Jarvis; George Ghostkeeper
- Website: ghostkeeper.bandcamp.com

Ghostkeeper is a Canadian experimental pop/rock band led by Shane Ghostkeeper, who writes most of the songs, and includes members Sarah Houle, drummer Eric Hamelin and bassist Ryan Bourne. Their songs combine elements of 1960s girl-group melodies, country music, 1990s indie rock, African pop, and traditional Aboriginal pow wow music.

== History ==
Ghostkeeper's debut album Children of the Great Northern Muskeg was released on Saved by Radio in July 2008 in Canada. It was recorded by Lorrie Matheson.

The band's second album, titled Ghostkeeper, was released in March 2010, by Flemish Eye Records. It was recorded by Jay Crocker and Scott Munro. The album, released on Flemish Eye Records, focuses on both Shane Ghostkeeper and Sarah Houle's northern Albertan origins. The album debuted at #32 on Earshot's Top 50, #6 on Chart Attack's Top 30 and at #28 on CBC Radio 3's Top 30 in the first week of March, 2010.

In 2012, Ghostkeeper release an album, Horse Chief! War Thief!, on the Saved by Radio label. In 2017, the band recorded another album, Sheer Blouse Buffalo Knocks.

Their 2022 album, Multidimensional Culture was longlisted for the 2023 Polaris Music Prize.

In 2023, Shane Ghostkeeper released his debut solo album, Songs for My People. The album was a longlisted nominee for the 2024 Polaris Music Prize.

Shane Ghostkeeper has also had occasional supporting or guest roles as an actor, including in the television series The Secret History of the Wild West, Tribal and Tales from the Rez, and the films Come True and The Birds Who Fear Death.

== Discography ==
- Children of the Great Northern Muskeg (Saved by Radio, 2008)
- Ghostkeeper (Flemish Eye Records, 2010)
- Horse Chief! War Thief! (Saved By Radio, 2012)
- Sheer Blouse Buffalo Knocks (2017)
- Multidimensional Culture (2022)
- Cîpayak Joy (2024)

== Members ==
- Shane Ghostkeeper (guitar, vocals)
- Sarah Houle (drums synth, vocals)
- Ryan Bourne (multiple instruments)
- Eric Hamelin (drums)

== See also ==
- Music of Canada
- Canadian rock
- List of Canadian musicians
- List of bands from Canada
- Category:Canadian musical groups
