= The Fast Red Road =

2000 novel by Stephen Graham Jones

The Fast Red Road: A Plainsong
- First Edition Cover
- Author: Stephen Graham Jones
- Cover artist: Polly Kanevsky
- Language: English
- Genre: Novel
- Publisher: Fiction Collective 2
- Publication date: 2000
- Publication place: United States
- Media type: Print (Hardcover, Paperback)
- Pages: 326 pp
- Followed by: All The Beautiful Sinners

The Fast Red Road: A Plainsong is a novel by Native American writer Stephen Graham Jones. It was his debut novel, published in 2000.

The novel was originally titled Golius: A Failed Sestina and used as Stephen's dissertation while attending Florida State University. Jones started writing the book after his dissertation director introduced him to Houghton-Mifflin editor Jane Silver at a conference. Jones pitched Silver an idea for a book, lying about having already written it. Silver expressed interest in working on the book and asked to see it; Jones started writing it later that day.

== Awards and nominations ==
The novel won the following awards: Independent Publisher's Award for Multicultural Fiction
