= Bleed into Me =

- First Edition Cover
- Author: Stephen Graham Jones
- Cover artist: Jacket design by
- Language: English
- Publisher: University of Nebraska Press
- Publication date: September 1, 2005
- Publication place: United States
- Media type: Print (hardback & paperback)
- Pages: 152 pp (first edition, paperback)
- ISBN: 0-8032-2605-5 (first edition, paperback)

Bleed into Me is a collection of short stories by Stephen Graham Jones and is part of Native Storiers: A Series of American Narratives.

== Synopsis ==
The book collects 17 short stories by Native American author Stephen Graham Jones:

- "Halloween"
- "Venison"
- "Captivity Narrative 109"
- "To Run Without Falling"
- "Episode 43: Incest"
- "Nobody Knows This"
- "Bile"
- "Filius Nervosus"
- "Last Success"
- "Conquistadors"
- "These Are the Names I Know"
- "The Fear of Jumping"
- "Bleed into Me"
- "Carbon"
- "Every Night Was Halloween"
- "Discovering America"

== Reception ==
Barbara J. Cook reviewed Bleed into Me for Studies in American Indian Literatures, noting that "In this collection of short stories, Stephen Graham Jones (Blackfeet) captures what it often means to be Indian in the twenty-first century." Amelia Gray, reviewing for Southwestern American Literature, stated that much of the violence in the collection's stories was "understated to the point of soundlessness", but that in "Captivity Narrative 109" the "narrative begins to battle with itself" as "Aiche's apathy borders on comic".

=== Awards ===
The novel won the following awards:

- Texas Institute of Letters Jesse Jones Award: For Fiction
- Finalist for the Texas Writers League Violet Crown Award
