= Shirley Jackson Award for Best Novel =

Literary award for works of dark fantasy and psychological suspense

- Awarded for: The best psychological suspense, horror, or dark fantastic novel of at least 40,000 words, published in English in the same calendar year
- Location: Massachusetts
- Country: United States
- Presented by: Readercon
- First award: 2007
- Most recent winner: Kylie Lee Baker (Bat Eater and Other Names for Cora Zeng)
- Website: shirleyjacksonawards.org

The Shirley Jackson Award for Best Novel is a literary award given annually at Readercon as part of their Shirley Jackson Awards.

== Winners and Finalists ==
* Winners

Year	Author	Novel	Publisher	Ref.
2007	Elizabeth Hand*	Generation Loss	Small Beer Press	
2007	Mike Mignola; Christopher Golden	Baltimore	Bantam Spectra	
2007	Toby Barlow	Sharp Teeth	William Heinemann Ltd	
2007	Dan Simmons	The Terror	Little, Brown and Company	
2007	David Peace	Tokyo Year Zero	Knopf Books	
2008	Jeffrey Ford*	The Shadow Year	William Morrow and Company	
2008	Doug Dorst	Alive in Necropolis	Riverhead Books	
2008	Steve Rasnic Tem; Melanie Tem	The Man on the Ceiling	Wizards of the Coast Discoveries	
2008	Daryl Gregory	Pandemonium	Del Rey Books	
2008	Jack O'Connell	The Resurrectionist	Algonquin Books	
2008	Margo Lanagan	Tender Morsels	Knopf Books	
2009	Victor LaValle*	Big Machine	Spiegel & Grau	
2009	Brian Evenson	Last Days	Underland Press	
2009	Caitlín R. Kiernan	The Red Tree	Roc Books	
2009	Karen Maitland	The Owl Killers	Delacorte	
2009	Helen Oyeyemi	White is for Witching	Nan A. Talese	
2009	Sarah Waters	The Little Stranger	Riverhead Books	
2010	Robert Jackson Bennett*	Mr. Shivers	Orbit Books	
2010	Michelle Paver	Dark Matter	Orion	
2010	Peter Straub	A Dark Matter	Doubleday	
2010	Mira Grant	Feed	Orbit Books	
2010	Alden Bell	The Reapers Are the Angels	Holt	
2010	Graham Joyce	The Silent Land	Gollancz	
2011	Sheri Holman*	Witches on the Road Tonight	Grove Press	
2011	Michael Cisco	The Great Lover	Chômu	
2011	Glen Duncan	The Last Werewolf	Canongate Books	
2011	S. P. Miskowski	Knock Knock	Omnium Gatherum	
2011	Reggie Oliver	The Dracula Papers	Chômu	
2011	Donald Ray Pollock	The Devil All the Time	Doubleday	
2012	Koji Suzuki*	Edge	Vertical	
2012	Brian Evenson	Immobility	Tor Books	
2012	Gillian Flynn	Gone Girl	Crown	
2012	Caitlín R. Kiernan	The Drowning Girl	Roc Books	
2012	Victor LaValle	The Devil in Silver	Spiegel & Grau	
2013	Robert Jackson Bennett*	American Elsewhere	Orbit Books	
2013	Joyce Carol Oates	The Accursed	Ecco Press	
2013	Andrew Pyper	The Demonologist	Orion; Simon & Schuster	
2013	Yangsze Choo	The Ghost Bride	William Morrow and Company	
2013	Marisha Pessl	Night Film	Random House	
2013	Michael Rowe	Wild Fell	ChiZine Publications	
2014	Jeff VanderMeer*	Annihilation	FSG Originals	
2014	Lauren Beukes	Broken Monsters	Mulholland Books	
2014	Christopher Buehlman	The Lesser Dead	Berkley Books	
2014	Alison Littlewood	The Unquiet House	Jo Fletcher Books	
2014	Josh Malerman	Bird Box	Ecco Press	
2014	Kanae Minato	Confessions	Mulholland Books	
2015	Gemma Files*	Experimental Film	ChiZine Publications	
2015	Sean Eads	Lord Byron's Prophecy	Lethe Press	
2015	Joshua Gaylord	When We Were Animals	Mulholland Books	
2015	Robert Levy	The Glittering World	Gallery	
2015	Ottessa Moshfegh	Eileen	Penguin Press	
2016	Emma Cline*	The Girls	Random House	
2016	Emma Donoghue	The Wonder	Little, Brown and Company	
2016	Michael Thomas Ford	Lily	Lethe Press	
2016	Stephen Graham Jones	Mongrels	Morrow	
2016	Iain Reid	I'm Thinking of Ending Things	Gallery / Scout	
2016	Eleanor Wasserberg	Foxlowe	Fourth Estate UK / Penguin US	
2017	Pyun Hye-young*	The Hole	Arcade Publishing	
2017	Dan Chaon	Ill Will	Ballantine Books	
2017	David Demchuk	The Bone Mother	ChiZine	
2017	Paul La Farge	The Night Ocean	Penguin Press	
2017	Victor LaValle	The Changeling	Spiegel & Grau	
2018	Catriona Ward*	Little Eve	Weidenfeld & Nicolson	
2018	Dale Bailey	In the Night Wood	John Joseph Adams	
2018	Tara Isabella Burton	Social Creature	Doubleday	
2018	Grady Hendrix	We Sold Our Souls	Quirk Books	
2018	Daisy Johnson	Everything Under	Jonathan Cape	
2019	Sarah Rose Etter*	The Book of X	Two Dollar Radio	
2019	Elizabeth Hand	Curious Toys	Little, Brown and Company	
2019	Miciah Bay Gault	Goodnight Stranger	Park Row Books	
2019	Leigh Bardugo	Ninth House	Gollancz	
2019	Wilson	Nothing to See Here	Ecco Press	
2019	Rachel Eve Moulton	Tinfoil Butterfly	MCD x FSG Productions	
2020	Stephen Graham Jones*	The Only Good Indians	Saga Press	
2020	Emily M. Danforth	Plain Bad Heroines	Morrow	
2020	Daisy Johnson	Sisters	Jonathan Cape	
2020	Silvia Moreno-Garcia	Mexican Gothic	Del Rey Books	
2020	Ottessa Moshfegh	Death in Her Hands	Penguin Books	
2020	Kate Reed Petty	True Story	Viking Press	
2021	Stephen Graham Jones*	My Heart Is a Chainsaw	Saga Press	
2021	Cassandra Khaw	Nothing But Blackened Teeth	Tor Nightfire	
2021	A.G. Slatter	All the Murmuring Bones	Titan Books	
2021	Cadwell Turnbull	No Gods, No Monsters	Blackstone Publishing	
2021	Jeff VanderMeer	Hummingbird Salamander	MCD	
2022	Gabino Iglesias*	The Devil Takes You Home	Mulholland Books	
2022	Sophie White*	Where I End	Tramp	
2022	Erin E. Adams	Jackal	Bantam Books	
2022	Paul Gandersman; Peter Hall	The Dead Friends Society	Encyclopocalypse	
2022	Christi Nogle	Beulah	Cemetery Gates	
2022	Addie Tsai	Unwieldy Creatures	Jaded Ibis	
2023	Tananarive Due*	The Reformatory	Saga Press	
2023	Christa Carmen	The Daughters of Block Island	Thomas & Mercer	
2023	Aliya Chaudhry	Every Version Ends in Death	Haunt	
2023	Stephen Graham Jones	Don't Fear the Reaper	Saga Press	
2023	John Milas	The Militia House	Henry Holt and Company	
2023	Alison Rumfitt	Brainwyrms	Tor Nightfire	
2024	Yvonne Battle-Felton*	Curdle Creek: A Novel	Henry Holt & Co	
2024	Alisa Alering	Smothermoss	Tin House	
2024	Christopher Golden	The House of Last Resort	St. Martin's Press	
2024	Monika Kim	The Eyes Are the Best Part	Erewhon	
2024	Gwendolyn Kiste	The Haunting of Velkwood	Saga Press	
2024	Tim McGregor	Eynhallow	Raw Dog Screaming	
2025	Kylie Lee Baker*	Bat Eater and Other Names for Cora Zeng	Hanover Square	
2025	Christa Carmen	How to Fake a Haunting	Thomas & Mercer	
2025	Lucy Rose	The Lamb	HarperCollins	
2025	Bitter Karella	Moonflow	Run For It	
2025	Susan Barker	Old Soul	G. P. Putnam's Sons	
2025	Grady Hendrix	Witchcraft for Wayward Girls	Berkley Books	
