= Company man (disambiguation) =

A company man refers to the employee of a corporation.

Company man may also refer to:

- Company Man (film), a 2000 film starring Sigourney Weaver and John Turturro
- A Company Man, a 2012 South Korean film starring So Ji-sub
- "Company Man" (Heroes), a television episode
- "The Company Man" (King of the Hill), a television episode
- The Company Man (novel), a 2011 novel by Robert Jackson Bennett
- The Company Man, a video game
- Company Man: Thirty Years of Controversy and Crisis in the CIA, a 2014 non-fiction book by John A. Rizzo
- "The Company Man", a song by a-ha from Minor Earth Major Sky

Company men may refer to:

- The Company Men, a 2010 American drama film
- The Company Men (TV series), a 1975 Australian TV series
