= Between Two Fires =

Between Two Fires may refer to:

- Between Two Fires (painting), an 1892 painting by Francis David Millet
- Between Two Fires, a 1911 film directed by J. Searle Dawley
- "Between Two Fires" (song), a 1984 song by Gary Morris
- Between Two Fires (album), a 1986 album by Paul Young
- Between Two Fires (novel), a 2012 novel by Christopher Buehlman
- "Between Two Fires" (Outlander)
- "Between Two Fires" (Stargate SG-1)
