= City of Blades =

2016 fantasy novel by Robert Jackson Bennett

First edition (publ. Broadway Books) Cover art by Sam Weber

City of Blades is a 2016 fantasy novel by Robert Jackson Bennett. It is the second novel in his Divine Cities trilogy.

== Synopsis ==
Five years after the events of City of Stairs, General Turyin Mulaghesh is called out of retirement so that she can carry out one last mission in the city of Voortyashtan.

== Reception ==
Kirkus Reviews found the novel to be "(l)ess literarily allusive than its predecessor", judging it to be "richly detailed and expertly plotted" — albeit with a less-than-optimal voice for Mulaghesh. Publishers Weekly called it "astonishingly good" and "a deep, powerful novel that’s worth reading and rereading", with Mulaghesh — "a physically and emotionally wounded warrior who both loathes battle and excels at it" — being a "fascinating character".

Strange Horizons considered the novel to "rework(..) the fundamentals of [Stairs] in ways that serve to make it a much stronger work", emphasizing that Bennett's depictions of colonialism had improved, but faulting him for "opaque" portrayals of the Voortyashtani citizenry.

National Public Radio lauded the novel as better and more "streamlined" than Stairs, and commended Bennett's decision to abandon both the setting and the majority of the cast of the first novel as "stupid and brave".
