= Vigilance (novel) =

2019 science fiction novel by Robert Jackson Bennett

- Author: Robert Jackson Bennett
- Language: English
- Genre: Science fiction
- Published: January 29, 2019
- Publisher: Tordotcom
- Publication place: United States
- Media type: Print
- Pages: 192
- ISBN: 9781250209443

Vigilance is a 2019 science fiction novel by Robert Jackson Bennett.

== Plot ==
=== Premise ===
In 2030, the United States is in decline. Young, optimistic people emigrate for better opportunities in other countries. Violence, particularly gun violence, is pervasive. Older people struggle with paranoia and medical debt.

The television network ONT turns the violence into entertainment: Vigilance, a game show in which disenchanted men are equipped with weapons and turned loose to commit mass murder in public places so resigned to the violence that they accept a fee for consideration as venues for the game show. But it's not easy for the contestants. The general public is full of people who have armed themselves against both the everyday violence and the possibility of a Vigilance episode.

And weirdly, a lot of locations wanted to be potential Vigilance episode venues. People wanted to prove themselves tough enough to defend themselves against the game show's killers.

=== Plot ===
John McDean is a television executive in charge of the violent game show Vigilance. He looks for the right type of contestant: angry young men, confident with weapons, but not so competent that no one has a chance against them. He also has certain types of viewers in mind: upper middle class men, white, suburban, and worried about medical debt.

Delyna is a bartender, and wonders whether she was right to stay in the US in hopes that things will get better. She knows her customers: a man who gets so drunk that he forgets where his gun is, a man whose aim in the restroom is unreliable, a man from Oklahoma, and others. The cook, Raphael, is convinced that there will be an episode of Vigilance tonight. On the manager's orders, she prepares a sign that says happy hour is in effect for the entire duration of the episode.

== Reception ==
On NPR, Jason Heller praised the novel, calling it "disturbing", "grimly clever", and "not something you'll forget anytime soon". Heller drew parallels with present-day (2019) United States society, described bartender Delyna as "the conscience of Vigilance", and quoted Bennett's inspirations for writing the book.

A Kirkus Reviews found the novel's satire "barn-door broad", but generally praised the book, saying, "Bennett ... can write up a storm."
