= The Divine Cities =

Novel trilogy by Robert Jackson Bennett

The Divine Cities is a trilogy of fantasy novels by the American writer Robert Jackson Bennett. It consists of the novels City of Stairs (published 2014), City of Blades (2016) and City of Miracles (2017).

== Synopsis ==
The series is set in a fictional world in which many near-omnipotent "divinities" once ruled over a large continent, imposing their whims on its peoples but also protecting them and allowing them to conquer and enslave the island nation of Saypur. But after the Saypuri found a way to overthrow and kill the divinities, almost all of their miracles ceased to work and the continent was plunged into plague and chaos.

At the outset of the first novel, City of Stairs, the Saypuri republic, emerging as an industrial and military power from the ruins of the divine empire, is militarily occupying the continent. The young Saypuri spy Shara Komayd and her brawny henchman Sigrud arrive in the continental capital of Bulikov and are faced with a plot to overthrow Saypuri authority and restore a divine regime.

In the second novel, City of Blades, set five years later, the war-weary Saypuri general Turyin Mulaghesh is pressured by her government to investigate the Continental city of Voortyashthan, where an insurgency against the Saypuri occupation is brewing amidst controversial efforts to reconstruct the Continent's economy. The third novel, City of Miracles, follows the actions of Sigrud following the events of City of Blades.

== Reception ==
City of Stairs was a finalist for the 2015 World Fantasy, Locus and British Fantasy Award.

The sequel, City of Blades, subverts readers' initial expectation of a narrative retread, according to Tor.com, whose reviewer highlighted the novel's "standout" protagonist, who as "an older woman with a significant disability (...) carries the entire narrative single-handedly". NPR considered the sequel to be the more accomplished novel for being less weighed down with exposition but no less rich or realized, and perhaps the better point of entry to the series. Kirkus Reviews described the sequel as "more somber in tone", and as "sometimes too talky but richly detailed and expertly plotted. A grand entertainment".

=== Awards ===
Hugo Award for Best Series - 2018 Shortlist

== List of novels ==
1. City of Stairs, Broadway Books, 9 September 2014, 464 pages, ISBN 978-0804137171
2. City of Blades, Broadway Books, 26 January 2016, 498 pages, ISBN 978-0553419719
3. City of Miracles, Broadway Books, 2 May 2017, 464 pages ISBN 978-0553419733
