= Mr. Shivers =

2010 novel by Robert Jackson Bennett

- Author: Robert Jackson Bennett
- Audio read by: T. Ryder Smith
- Genre: Fiction
- Publisher: Orbit Books
- Publication date: 2010
- Media type: Print (hardback, paperback), ebook, audiobook
- Pages: 336 pages (first edition)
- Awards: Shirley Jackson Award
- ISBN: 0316054682 First edition
- OCLC: 455821243
- Followed by: The Company Man

Mr. Shivers is a 2010 novel by Robert Jackson Bennett and marks his literary debut. It was first published in hardback in the United States by Orbit Books on January 15, 2010. A paperback and audiobook release was also published during the same year; the audiobook is narrated by T. Ryder Smith. Set during the Great Depression, the book follows one man's attempt to take his revenge against the one who murdered his daughter. It has been described by the Los Angeles Review of Books as featuring "a band of Depression-era hobo vigilantes who trek across the Dust Bowl after the supernatural boogeyman, a metaphorical specter who haunts the starved nation".

After its release the book won several literary awards, including the 2010 Shirley Jackson Award for Best Novel.

== Synopsis ==
The novel follows the character of Marcus Connelly, a man whose marriage deteriorated after his beloved daughter is murdered by a man known only as the "Shiver Man". Intent on finding him and making him pay for his crimes, Connelly sets out on the rails and travels from location to location in search of work and clues. While he faces several setbacks – as well as warnings to leave the killer alone – Connelly finds support via other travelers who are also looking to bring about the Shiver Man's death. Along the way it becomes apparent that the Shiver Man is more than he seems, as he is capable of escaping any prison cell and other feats that would be impossible for normal human beings.

== Development ==
For the book, Bennett chose to set the novel during the Great Depression as "just mentioning its name summons up a world in the reader’s head" and has specified that Mr. Shivers is set in "the idea of The Great Depression, the one we all have" and that he was "playing around with our own myths", as he felt that the United States does not "get the cool King Arthur origin story". He also felt that hobo culture would fit in the novel as he saw it as being "untapped in horror/fantasy" and that the "idea of an American hobo is already half-founded in tall tales and folklore". The titular character of Mr. Shivers was partially based on an incident from Bennett's childhood, when he came across a man smoking a cigarette under a bridge. Bennett stated that the man "waved at me like he recognized me, and smiled, and it wasn’t a nice smile. Funny thing was, I felt like I recognized him, too."

== Critical reception ==
Critical reception for Mr. Shivers has been generally positive, with The Guardian stating that the book was "a startling début, a deft amalgam of thriller, cerebral horror and American gothic, written with a stark and artful simplicity that complements the examination of struggling humanity pushed to its limits." Common praise for the book centers on Bennett's writing, as Tor.com's Stefan Raets stated that "If the setting’s what pulled me into the novel, Robert Jackson Bennett’s spectacular prose is what sold me". The setting was also frequently highlighted favorably in reviews, as Michael Dirda of The Washington Post felt that it was "convincingly bleak" while also praising the titular character and comparing him to Hannibal Lecter. Barry Forshaw of the Daily Express also drew comparisons, comparing Bennett to Stephen King and John Steinbeck. SF Signal and the Historical Novel Society also reviewed the book, with the former stating that while readers familiar with science fiction, horror, and fantasy tropes would find some parts of the book predictable, it was also a "very strong debut novel".

Bennett has stated that some readers have complained that the book did not have enough gore or that although it was shelved as horror, that they did not see it as a horror novel. Of this, Bennett has commented that he was "not going to write straight fantasy, or straight horror, or straight anything" as he viewed it as dull.

== Awards ==
Mr. Shivers won the 2010 Shirley Jackson Award for Best Novel and the 2011 Sydney J. Bounds Award for Best Newcomer. It received a special commendation at the 2011 Crawford Award ceremony.
