= Howls from the Dark Ages =

2022 short story collection

Howls from the Dark Ages: An Anthology of Medieval Horror is a 2022 horror short story collection edited by P. L. McMillan and Solomon Forse. It was published by HOWL Society Press.

== Overview ==
The anthology includes a foreword from Christopher Buehlman, and includes 18 short stories set in the Middle Ages by different authors.

=== Contents ===
- "The Crowing" by Caleb Stephens
- "Angelus" by Philippa Evans
- "Palette" by J. L. Kiefer
- "Brother Cornelius" by Peter Ong Cook
- "In Thrall to This Good Earth" by Hailey Piper
- "In Every Drop" by Lindsey Ragsdale
- "Deus Vult" by Ethan Yoder
- "The Final Book of Sainte Foy's Miracles" by M. E. Bronstein
- "A Dowry for Your Hand" by Michelle Tang
- "The Mouth of Hell" by Cody Goodfellow
- "The Lady of Leer Castle" by Christopher O'Halloran
- "Schizzare" by Bridget D. Brave
- "The King of Youth vs. The Knight of Death" by Patrick Barb
- "The Forgotten Valley" by C. B. Jones
- "The Fourth Scene" by Brian Evenson
- "White Owl" by Stevie Edwards
- "A Dark Quadrivium" by David Worn
- "The Lai of the Danse Macabre" by Jessica Peter

== Reception ==
The anthology was mostly well received by critics. It received a starred review from Library Journal, which called it "a delightfully terrifying trip through history". Joshua Gage, writing for Cemetery Dance, described it as "an impressively strong collection of stories centered around a cool, historical theme".
