= Experimental Film (novel) =

2015 horror novel by Gemma Files

- Author: Gemma Files
- Language: English
- Genre: Horror
- Publisher: ChiZine Publications
- Publication date: 3 December 2015
- Publication place: Canada
- Pages: 352 (paperback)
- Awards: 2015 Shirley Jackson Award for Best Novel; 2016 Sunburst Award for Adult Novel
- ISBN: 9781771483490

Experimental Film is a 2015 novel by Gemma Files. It tells the story of Lois Carnes, a former film professor who discovers a supernatural connection between her family and a deceased filmmaker. The novel won the 2015 Shirley Jackson Award for Best Novel.

== Plot ==
Present-day

Lois Cairns, a former film professor, narrates her story.

Lois and her husband Simon have an autistic son named Clark. In 2014, Lois works part-time as a film blogger. Filmmaker Wrob Barney shows Untitled 13, an experimental piece involving images based on fairy tales. Lois connects the imagery to a favorite childhood story: "Lady Midday: A Fairy Tale of the Wends", translated by Iris Whitcomb.

Cairns suspects that Untitled 13 is plagiarized. Wrob admits that some segments involving "Lady Midday" were taken from a film he uncovered while working as an archivist. Lois suspects that Iris Whitcomb was the filmmaker. She next interviews Jan Mattheius, Wrob's ex-boyfriend. Mattheius hires Lois to research the old films. Wrob accuses Lois of stealing his story. Lois hires a former student, Safie Hewsen, to assist with the investigation.

Lois and Safie tour Vinegar House, the Whicomb's old residence. Lois explores the greenhouse, which served as Whitcomb's film set. She has a vision of Lady Midday, then experiences a seizure. Safie and Lois compile the information they have gathered.

Iris's story

The Wròbl family are Wendish immigrants living in Canada in the late 1800s. In 1886, Handrij Wròbl kills most of his family in an occult ritual. His nine-year-old daughter Giscelia survives. Giscelia claims that she was saved by Lady Midday, who appeared and decapitated Handrij. Giscelia is adopted, and her name is changed to Iris Dunlopp.

In the early 1900s, Iris marries Arthur Whitcomb. During the Whitcombs' European honeymoon, they visit Dzéngast. Iris participates in a folk ritual; she suffers a medical episode. Her physician believes she has had a sun-stroke, while the villagers state that she has been "crowned by the Witch." At this time, Iris is four months pregnant. Iris later gives birth to a son named Hyatt, who would be considered autistic by present-day standards.

In 1908, Hyatt disappears; Iris becomes a recluse. She later adopts Vasek Sidlo, a blind boy who is rumored to have supernatural powers. Sidlo has the gift of transferring memories onto film. Sidlo uses Iris's childhood memory of Lady Midday to make a magical film.

In 1918, Iris boards a train, but she never arrives at her destination. In her train car, Iris watches Sidlo's film. This summons Lady Midday. Lady Midday plans to use Iris to create films about the goddess, bringing new worshippers to replace the diminishing Wendish population. Iris, realizing that the goddess could wreak havoc on the world, sets her own film on fire. Inside her train compartment, investigators find a burned film projector. Neither the case of Iris nor Hyatt is ever solved.

Present-day

Wrob breaks into Lois's apartment and steals documents. Mattheius is killed in a fire, likely started by silver nitrate film. Whitcomb's films are also destroyed.

Safie tracks down Sidlo, still alive and approximately one hundred years old. He offers to make another film using a memory of Lady Midday. Iris's ghost appears before Lois, dressed as Lady Midday. Iris admits that she struck Lois with the seizure in the greenhouse and killed Jan in the fire; she was hoping to protect Lois by driving her away from the goddess. The ghost shows Lois a vision of Iris's last day in the train car. Iris kills Sidlo out of mercy.

Safie and Lois plan to burn their films so that Lady Midday can never use them to enter the world again. Wrob announces the premiere of Untitled Fourteen, billing it as the first public screening of Iris Whitcomb's films. In truth, Rob has stolen a magical film created by Sidlo.

Lois and Sadie rush to the premiere, where a fire breaks out. Lady Midday appears before Lois. She offers a future in which Clark is neurotypical. Lois realizes that this vision of Clark could never be "her" version; she rejects Lady Midday. The goddess raises her sword. Wrob pushes Lois out of the way and is killed. The authorities conclude that the fire was natural, caused by the flammable silver nitrate film. Lois and Safie coauthor a book about Iris and Wrob; this book contains no references to any supernatural occurrence. In a metafictional twist, Lois writes Experimental Film, which she knows can never be published.

The novel closes with a quote from a spirit medium who contacted the ghost of Iris.

== Style ==
The story is divided into sections named after parts of a film: TITLE CARDS, Film History, Film, Screening, CREDITS, and STING. Nina Allan described the novel as a written film, calling it "a film so experimental it eschews the medium altogether."

== Reception and awards ==
Writing for Locus, author John Langan called Experimental Film a "fine, compelling novel" which draws on a tradition of horror stories relating to "hidden texts." Normally, such texts are written, such as the Necronomicon created by H. P. Lovecraft; occasionally, they take the form of films in works such as Ancient Images by Ramsey Campbell. Langan noted that Experimental Film succeeds "in its understanding of film, from the process by which it is made to those by which it is disseminated and discussed; from its history to its culture." The review praised the character of Lois Cairns, who is always conscious of her role as narrator in this story. Langan further praised the novel for its empathetic portrayal of parenting an autistic child, as well as its descriptions of the city of Toronto.

Nina Allan of Strange Horizons compared the novel to works such as The Blair Witch Project and Sinister. Allan notes that the novel interrogates our relationship with the medium of film. In some ways, film is magical; in others, it "[provides] us with objectively verifiable images, documentary evidence, is seen as an arbiter of the rational..." The Lady Midday films which serve as an important plot point of the novel provide a link between the supernatural and the natural world. Allan praised the way in which Experimental Film deals with metafiction and narrative issues, noting that Files, through her narrator Cairns, never lets the reader forget "who is the director here and who is the audience."

The novel won the 2015 Shirley Jackson Award for Best Novel and the 2016 Sunburst Award for Adult Novel.
