= Christophe Claro =

French writer and translator

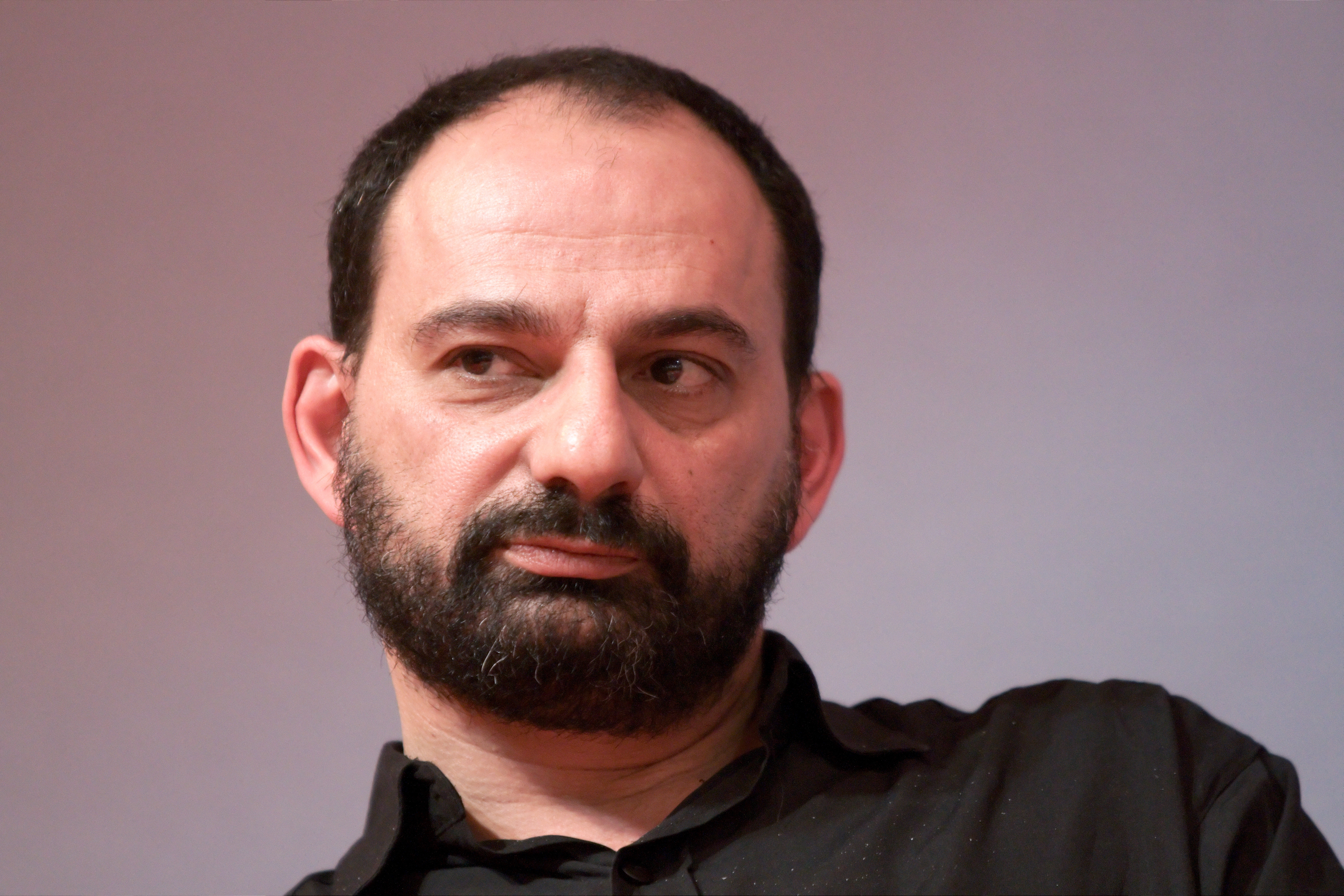
Christophe Claro in March 2010

Christophe Claro, better known as Claro (born 14 May 1962, in Paris), is a French writer and translator. He studied at the Lycée Lakanal in Sceaux, before working as a publishers' proofreader (1983–1986). He is one of the leading promoters of contemporary American literature in France. His translations in French include works by William T. Vollmann, Thomas Pynchon and Mark Z. Danielewski, amongst many others.

One of his novels, Electric Flesh (Chair électrique in French), was translated in English and published in the United States in 2006 (translation by Brian Evenson).

== Biography ==
Christophe Claro spent his childhood in the suburbs of Paris. After studying literature at the Lycée Lakanal in Sceaux, Hauts-de-Seine, he worked in a bookstore from 1983 to 1986, then became a proofreader for various Publishing houses. He published his first novel, Ezzelina, with Arléa in 1986. His first translation from English, Kilomètre zéro by Thomas Sanchez (writer), appeared in 1990.

While pursuing his career as a writer and translator, he went on to publish novels and short stories on a regular basis, while also translating major contemporary Anglo-Saxon authors, including William T. Vollmann, Thomas Pynchon, Salman Rushdie, John Barth, Mark Z. Danielewski, James Flint, William H. Gass, Lucy Ellmann, and Hubert Selby Jr. He describes himself as a “literary treasure hunter.”

For his translations, he was awarded the Maurice-Edgar Coindreau Prize by the Société des gens de lettres in 2003.

Since 2004, Claro has also been director, alongside Arnaud Hofmarcher, of the American fiction collection “Lot 49” published by Le Cherche midi. He was a columnist for Le MondeMaylis de Kerangal from the fall of 2017 to July 2019. He is also a member of the Collectif Inculte (alongside Arno Bertina, Hélène Gaudy, Maylis de Kerangal, Mathias Énard, and others) and editorial director of Inculte publishing.

On May 5, 2020, he asked the Prix Renaudot Prize jury to remove his novel La Maison indigène(Actes Sud) from its shortlist, stating on his blog, in the midst of lockdown due to the COVID-19 pandemic: “In these times when the issue of masks is on everyone's lips (if not on their faces), I have no desire to participate in any masquerade whatsoever.”
