= The Suicide Motor Club =

2016 novel by Christopher Buehlman

- Author: Christopher Buehlman
- Audio read by: Christopher Buehlman
- Language: English
- Published: 2016
- Publisher: Berkley Books
- Publication place: United States
- Media type: Print, e-book, audiobook
- Pages: 368 pages
- ISBN: 1101988738
- Preceded by: The Lesser Dead

The Suicide Motor Club is a 2016 horror novel by American author Christopher Buehlman, who also provided the narration for the audiobook edition. It was first published in the United States on June 7, 2016, through Berkley Books and is about a nomadic band of vampires and the lone survivor of their blood lust. The book ties into Buehlman's prior novel The Lesser Dead via the character Clayton, who is repeatedly referred to by The Lesser Dead's main characters.

== Synopsis ==
The book is set in the 1960s, where a group of nomadic vampires drive across America in muscle cars in search of victims. They attack Judith Lamb and her family, killing her husband and son. Judith herself almost dies but manages to survive and join a convent in the hope that it will bring her peace. In the convent she's approached by The Bereaved, a group of vampire hunters seeking the destruction of all vampires.

== Reception ==
The Suicide Motor Club received reviews from the Library Journal, Booklist, Locus Online, and Publishers Weekly. Creative Loafing Tampa Bay and The A.V. Club also reviewed the book, the latter of whom felt that while the book had some weaknesses the work's pacing made the book "easily [breeze] by those weaknesses". Dread Central rated the work at three out of five stars, praising The Suicide Motor Club for its originality.
