= Foundryside =

2018 novel by Robert Jackson Bennett

- First edition cover
- Author: Robert Jackson Bennett
- Language: English
- Series: The Founders
- Genre: Fantasy
- Published: August 21, 2018
- Publisher: Crown Publishing Group
- Publication place: United States
- Media type: Print (hardcover and paperback), audiobook, e-book
- Pages: 512
- ISBN: 978-1524760366
- Followed by: Shorefall

Foundryside is a 2018 fantasy novel by Robert Jackson Bennett. It was first published by Crown Publishing Group on August 21, 2018. It is the first book in a trilogy that includes Shorefall (2020) and Locklands (2022).

== Plot ==
Foundryside follows Sancia Grado, a thief in the industrial city of Tevanne, where powerful merchant houses control society through "scriving", a form of magical inscription for sigils that alters the behavior of objects by convincing them of alternative physical truths. Sancia possesses an unusual ability to sense scrived objects, which allows her to carry out high-risk thefts but causes her constant physical distress.

She is hired to steal an artifact from a warehouse in the Foundryside district, but the job goes wrong when she discovers the object is a sentient key, later named Clef. Unlike ordinary scrived items, Clef can think, speak, and adapt, and it appears to originate from a more advanced and largely forgotten form of scriving. After the theft, Sancia becomes the target of multiple merchant houses, particularly House Candiano, which seeks to control the artifact.

While fleeing, Sancia reconnects with Gregor Dandolo, a former soldier and scholar who once helped her escape slavery. Together, they investigate Clef and uncover evidence that modern scriving is a limited version of a far more sophisticated system developed by an ancient civilization. Clef suggests the existence of hierophants—powerful entities capable of manipulating reality on a large scale—and implies that similar artifacts could enable unprecedented control over the physical world.

As House Candiano intensifies its pursuit, Sancia and Gregor attempt to prevent the house from obtaining Clef and unlocking its capabilities. In the process, Sancia begins to experiment with scriving herself, pushing beyond its conventional limits. The conflict culminates in a confrontation that disrupts the plans of House Candiano and prevents immediate exploitation of the artifact.

By the end of the novel, Sancia retains possession of Clef, though the broader implications of its existence remain unresolved. The balance of power within Tevanne is destabilized, and the discovery of advanced scriving technology suggests further conflict to come.

== Reception ==
Kirkus Reviews considered it "grand entertainment" (if one can "accept the notion that the laws of gravity are just suggestions"), with Sancia being "a gamin version of the Tom Cruise of Mission Impossible, and police officer Gregor Dandolo "worthy of Umberto Eco".

The Verge described it as "essentially a cyberpunk novel, trapped in the clothes of an epic fantasy", and "pressingly modern and relevant", lauding both the "enthralling heist" and the extent to which Bennett focused on "the ethics of capitalism".

Locus praised Bennett's depiction of "the general mayhem that follows in Sancia’s wake" as "complicated and believable, but never confusing", and called Sancia "an enjoyable protagonist" and "three-dimensional, marked by a massive case of PTSD and an inability to jettison her sense of empathy", but faulted scriving as not only overly complex, but "so interwoven with the politics [of Tevanne] that the first quarter or so of the book has been overtaken by infodumps".

Tor.com commended Bennett for "the central message of Sancia's character arc", and noted that the novel as a whole is "populated with rich, complex people".
