= A Drop of Corruption =

2025 fantasy novel by Robert Jackson Bennett

- Author: Robert Jackson Bennett
- Audio read by: Andrew Fallaize
- Language: English
- Series: Ana and Din Mysteries
- Release number: 2
- Genre: Fantasy, murder mystery
- Publisher: Del Rey Books
- Publication date: April 1, 2025
- Publication place: United States
- Media type: Print (hardcover, paperback), audio, eBook
- Pages: 480
- ISBN: 9780593723821
- Preceded by: The Tainted Cup
- Followed by: A Trade of Blood

A Drop of Corruption is a 2025 fantasy murder mystery novel by Robert Jackson Bennett. It is a sequel to his 2024 novel The Tainted Cup.

A third book in the series, A Trade of Blood, was published in August 2026.

== Plot ==
Yarrowdale is an independent seaside kingdom on the edge of the Khanum Empire; its political situation is unstable, and the Empire is in the process of annexing it. The Shroud, a floating laboratory in the Bay of Yarrow, is essential to the Empire's research on leviathans and the creation of new technology using leviathan blood.

Din and Ana are sent to Yarrowdale to investigate the death of Sujedo, a Treasury official. As a tax collector and servant of the Empire, Sujedo had many enemies, including the King of Yarrow himself. Din attempts to find solace in physical intimacy with strangers, while dealing with the debts he has inherited from his late father. He contemplates leaving the Iudex to join the Legion as a frontline fighter.

Din meets the Apothetikal Tira Malo, his local contact. Malo is a warden, a native of Yarrow who serves the Empire with her enhanced senses. Throughout the story, she assists Din and Ana in their investigation. Sujedo was apparently killed inside a locked room in a tall tower; pieces of his dismembered body were later discovered in a canal. Ana deduces that the man from the tower was actually an imposter pretending to be Sujedo. First, he kidnapped Sujedo and took his place. This allowed him to access an imperial bank vault using Sujedo’s identity. The imposter then falsified a murder scene, killed the real Sujedo, and dumped the body into the canal.

Din and Ana investigate the bank where the imposter impersonated Sujedo. Inside the safety deposit box of an Apothetikal named Ghrelin, the imposter has left a severed head. Inside its mouth lies a message: “For those who sip from the marrow.” Ana interviews Ghrelin and his superior Thelenai. Ghrelin previously worked at the Shroud. Ana suspects that the message from the imposter refers to leviathans’ bone marrow.

Din and Malo search for smugglers in the wilderness surrounding Yarrowdale. They find that many have been killed by leviathan’s blood, which caused the victims to fuse with the surrounding organic environment. Ana deduces that the imposter is an Apothetikal who previously worked in the Shroud: Sunus Pyktis. Thelenai and Ghrelin researched leviathan bone marrow at the Shroud. They succeeded in stabilizing a piece of marrow, which can be transported to Imperial soil to produce an unending supply of leviathan blood. This will render the Shroud obsolete and free the Empire from its reliance on Yarrowdale. In order to speed their research, Thelenai gave Pyktis and Ghrelin an illegal apothetikal modification called augury. This increased their abilities to recognize patterns and make predictions. It also caused Pyktis to eventually become paranoid and go mad, leading to the current situation.

The king of Yarrow is murdered by poison, further destabilizing the political situation. The king's heir, Prince Camak, asks Din and Ana for assistance. Din is sent into the Shroud. He interviews the surviving augurs who worked with Pyktis. Din surmises that Pyktis was a member of the Yarrow royal family, a child of the dead king. Years ago, the dead king had sent Pyktis to the study in the Empire and infiltrate it from within.

Din and Malo chase Pyktis and his conspirators away from Yarrowdale. They fight the conspirators and find that Pyktis has already been killed. Ana brings Pyktis’s corpse to the court of Yarrow. She accuses Camak of treachery: Pyktis was Camak’s twin, and he has taken his brother's place. The dead “Pyktis” was the true prince. Pyktis planned to usurp the throne and destroy the leviathan’s marrow without destroying the Shroud, ensuring that he could remain the king of an independent Yarrowdale. The Yarrow court executes Pyktis.

Din arrests Thelenai for her illegal use of augury. Din decides to stay with the Iudex instead of joining the Legion. Malo joins the Iudex. A ship arrives to transport the marrow to Imperial soil.

== Major themes ==
In a review for Locus, Jake Casella Brookins praised Bennett's timely themes. Specifically, the review noted that the book "sketched a subdued defense of social infrastructure and guardrails that I found, in this moment of institutional collapse, surprisingly moving to read." Casella Brookins also had the following to say regarding the politics of the novel:

What I was worried about in The Tainted Cup was how its setup – a society under existential threat from external, nonhuman forces – easily lends itself to fascism, which has certainly been a critique of the similarly constructed Attack on Titan. (Continuing the trend of drawing from a certain strand of anime, A Drop of Corruption feels like it's channeling at least a little bit of Neon Genesis Evangelion, in its dangerous repurposing of eerie otherworldly remains for human survival.) A Drop of Corruption doesn't exactly refute that worry, but, particularly by contrasting the Empire with the highly stratified monarchy of Yarrow, it does reframe it.

Casella Brookins concluded by noting that the novel stays in conversation with the genres of science fiction and fantasy, which tend to have a "love affair with benevolent dictatorships." The review ultimately concluded by stating that "I'm not sure that the government Ana and Din serve is definitely a good one, but it is incredibly refreshing to see the question poised so openly, and the answer stated so clearly. It ought to be."

== Reception and awards ==
In a starred review, Publishers Weekly called the novel "wonderfully clever and compulsively readable." The review characterized Ana and Din as "off-beat sleuths who call to mind Rex Stout's Nero Wolfe and Archie Goodwin..." The review stated that "Bennett skillfully integrates humor and magic into the complex puzzle plot..." and recommended the book for fans of Randall Garrett. Kirkus Reviews called the novel "part fantasy, part procedural" and noted that "red herrings—some in various stages of rot—abound as Ana, Din, and Malo sort out all the nefarious doings." The review concluded that the novel was a "grand entertainment, as ever with Bennett's richly imaginative yarns."

The novel was a finalist for the 2026 Hugo Award for Best Novel and Locus Award for Best Fantasy Novel.
