= The Tainted Cup =

2024 fantasy novel by Robert Jackson Bennett

- Author: Robert Jackson Bennett
- Audio read by: Andrew Fallaize
- Illustrator: David Lindroth
- Language: English
- Series: Ana and Din Mysteries
- Release number: 1
- Genre: Fantasy, murder mystery
- Published: February 6, 2024
- Publisher: Del Rey Books
- Publication place: United States
- Media type: Print (hardcover, paperback), audio, eBook
- Pages: 410
- Awards: Hugo Award for Best Novel; World Fantasy Award—Novel
- ISBN: 9781984820709
- Dewey Decimal: 813.6
- LC Class: PS3602.E66455
- Followed by: A Drop of Corruption

The Tainted Cup is a 2024 fantasy murder mystery novel by Robert Jackson Bennett. It is the first novel in the Ana and Din Mysteries (previously: Shadow of the Leviathan) series and was followed by A Drop of Corruption (2025). The novel won the 2025 Hugo Award for Best Novel and the 2025 World Fantasy Award.

== Summary ==
=== Setting ===
The Empire of Khanum is surrounded by a sea wall. Each wet season, leviathans emerge from the ocean and are turned back by imperial weaponry. Imperial citizens live in constant fear of a breach in the walls.

The administrative branch of the Empire includes divisions called Iyalets; these include the Iudex (investigators), Legion (armed forces), Engineers (infrastructure), and Apothetikals (botanical modification). Apothetikals use leviathan-derived technology to modify both plants and humans, giving them special powers. Humans who have received apothetikal modifications are called sublimes. Several types of sublimes include engravers (who have perfect memory) and axioms (who have augmented mathematical abilities).

The Empire is divided into various cantons. Years before the start of the story, the canton of Oypat was overrun by a modified plant known as dappleglass. Despite the efforts of the apothetikals, no cure for dappleglass infestation was found. The entire canton was sealed off, and its citizens were evacuated to other regions.

=== Plot ===
Dinios "Din" Kol, a young engraver, is chosen as the assistant to the eccentric Iudex investigator Anagosa "Ana" Dolabra; Din does his best to hide his severe dyslexia. Their first murder investigation concerns the death of engineer Taqtasa Blas, whose body is found in a mansion belonging to the wealthy Haza family. Blas was poisoned with dappleglass, which caused plant matter to grow instantaneously through his body. Soon after their investigation starts, a leviathan breaches the sea wall protecting the nearby canton of Tala. Ana and Din learn that several of the engineers responsible for maintaining that wall have been found dead, killed in the same manner as Blas.

Ana and Din travel to Talagray, the capital of Tala, to continue their investigation. There, they are assisted by several imperial officers, including Kepheus Strovi, a Legion captain with whom Din develops a romantic bond; Tuwey Uhad, an engraver who serves as the head of the local Iudex division; Uhad's assistant Tazi Miljin, a war hero; Itonia Nusis, an apothetikal; and Vasiliki Kalista, an engineer.

Din discovers that all of the deceased engineers had gathered at the Haza family's estate on the same day. The investigators also identify a missing associate from their group: Kiz Jolgalgan, an apothetikal and a survivor of Oypat. Jolgalgan becomes the chief suspect for the poisonings. Nusis tells Din that Oypat's destruction could have been prevented: a cure for dappleglass was in development, but its production was stalled by red tape. Meanwhile, more bodies are discovered: Blas's secretary and a merchant who sold goods to the Hazas. These two were killed by a sharp blow to the skull, pointing toward a second killer: a type of altered person known as a twitch, with enhanced speed.

Fayazi Haza reports that her own father, Kaygi Haza, was killed by dappleglass at his home on the night of a party. Din determines that the poison was introduced to the water tank supplying Kaygi's bathhouse. He ascertains that the ten engineers were also present that night, part of a coterie of officers being cultivated for patronage by the Haza family. Soon after, Jolgalgan is found dead from what appears to be a laboratory accident, and Nusis is killed with a blow to the skull.

Ana reveals her theory of the case: Jolgalgan killed Blas. She then infiltrated the party at the Haza estate and poisoned the bathwater. While Kaygi was in the bath, he drank from a ewer of wine, which became infected with dappleglass spores. During a patronage meeting later that evening, the ten engineers drank from the same ewer, contracting the contagion and eventually leading to their deaths. Their deaths and the resulting breach in the sea wall were never intended. Jolgalgan was seeking revenge against Blas and the Hazas for the destruction of Oypat: The Haza family used their patronage network (including Blas) to block production of the cure for dappleglass, as the destruction of Oypat would increase the value of their own landholdings. One of Fayazi's aides is revealed to be an assassin sent by the senior branch of the Haza family to keep Fayazi in line. This aide is the twitch who killed the secretary, the merchant, and Nusis. Ana kills the twitch by baiting her into entering a room poisoned with dappleglass.

The Legion successfully repels another leviathan attack. Later, Ana reveals that Jolgalgan did not act alone; she was assisted by the engraver Uhad. He created a diversion during the Haza party, allowing Jolgalgan to access the water tank unnoticed. He later sabotaged Jolgalgan's laboratory when the investigation drew too near. Uhad was motivated by a desire to combat the corruption of the Hazas, who allowed the destruction of an entire canton.

Din is promoted to become a full assistant investigator. Ana reveals that she knew about his dyslexia all along, as well as that he cheated to pass his exams to join the Iudex; she chose him as her assistant because of his willingness to bend rules. Ana and Din are sent on their next assignment.

== Reception ==
A review in Kirkus Reviews called the novel "a drawing-room mystery, albeit the drawing room is the size of a small otherworldly kingdom". The review stated that the character of Ana "combines the wiles of Irene Adler with the eccentricities of Sherlock Holmes, including his penchant for narcotics." The review concludes that "the reader fond of faux medieval neologisms and occasional grownup moments ... will enjoy solving the mystery with our heroes." Jake Casella Brookins of Locus also compared the novel to the classic mysteries, stating there are "recognizable but thankfully not-overdone" Sherlock Holmes analogs. He praised Bennett's writing style, noting that the author is "adroit at concisely setting up characters, vividly painting backgrounds, and then using them for eyeball-kicking action sequences". Brookins observed that the plot takes place in "a society that has defined itself entirely in terms of an external threat, and adjusted its moral and legal schemes accordingly," and drew parallels with the manga Attack on Titan.

Martin Cahill of Reactor praised Bennett's "sharp eye for character, his wit and thoughtfulness infusing every corner of imaginative worldbuilding, and combining both to create a thrilling, clever mystery that will keep readers on the hook until the very end." Cahill particularly praised the characters of Din and Ana, calling them "expertly drawn... given life in such brilliant, bright strokes by such a steady hand." Publishers Weekly gave the novel a starred review, calling it "a fresh and exciting take" on a classic dynamic detective duo.

== Accolades ==
Awards and honors
Year	Award	Category	Result	Ref.
2024	NPR Books We Love		Listed	
2025	Hugo Award	Best Novel	Won	
2025	Locus Award	Best Fantasy Novel	Finalist	
2025	Edgar Award	Edgar Allan Poe Award for Best Novel	Finalist	
2025	World Fantasy Award	Best Novel	Won	
