= Robert Jackson Bennett =

American writer (born 1984)

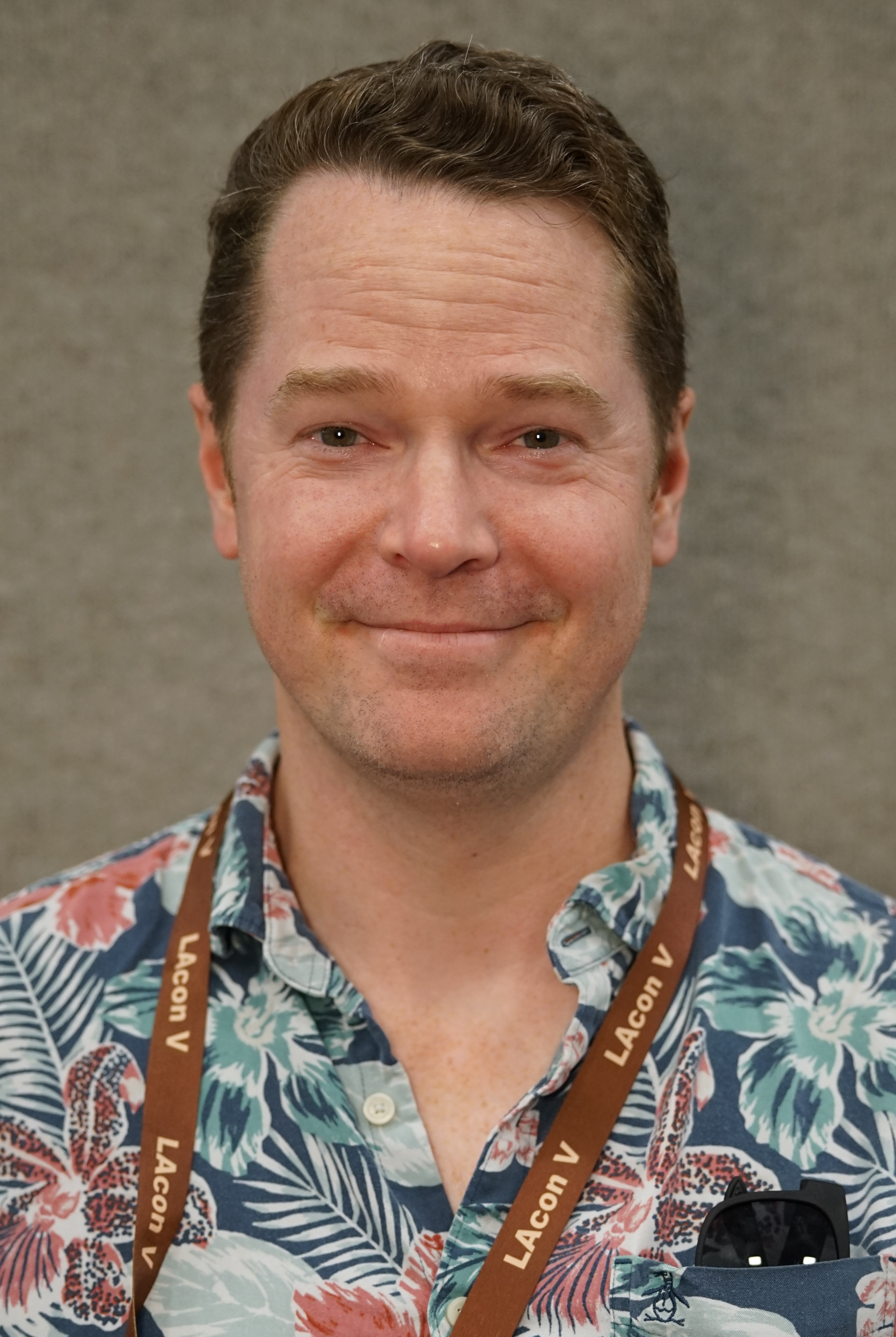
- Bennett at 2026 Worldcon
- Born: June 22, 1984 (age 42); Baton Rouge, Louisiana, U.S.
- Education: University of Texas at Austin
- Occupation: author
- Writing career
- Genres: Speculative fiction; fantasy; horror
- Notable works: The Divine Cities; The Founders; Mr. Shivers
- Website: robertjacksonbennett.com

Robert Jackson Bennett (born June 22, 1984) is an American writer of speculative fiction. His fantasy novel The Tainted Cup won the 2025 Hugo Award for Best Novel and the World Fantasy Award for Best Novel.

== Early life and education ==
Robert Jackson Bennett was born in Baton Rouge, Louisiana. He graduated from the University of Texas at Austin with special honors in English in 2005, and moved to Austin, Texas.

== Career ==
Bennett's debut as an author was the novel Mr. Shivers (2010). He went on to write The Company Man (2011), The Troupe (2012), and American Elsewhere (2013).

Bennett's fifth novel, City of Stairs (2014), was the first of a fantasy trilogy, The Divine Cities, followed by City of Blades (2016) and City of Miracles (2017). The Divine Cities trilogy was a finalist for Best Series for the 2018 Hugo Awards.

In August 2018, Crown published Bennett's Foundryside, the first installment of his The Founders Trilogy. That book was followed by Shorefall in 2020 and Locklands in 2022.

In February 2024, Del Rey published Bennett's The Tainted Cup, the first book in his The Shadow of the Leviathan series, which won the 2025 Hugo Award for Best Novel. The book was followed by A Drop of Corruption in 2025; the third book, A Trade of Blood was released in August 2026.

== Awards and nominations ==
Awards for Robert Jackson Bennett
Year	Work	Award	Category	Result	Ref.
2010	Mr. Shivers	Shirley Jackson Award	Best Novel	Won	
2011	Mr. Shivers	Crawford Award	—	Commendation	
2011	Mr. Shivers	British Fantasy Award	The Sydney J. Bounds Award for Best Newcomer	Won	
2012	The Company Man	Philip K. Dick Award	—	Special Citation	
2012	The Company Man	Edgar Award	Best Paperback Original	Won	
2013	American Elsewhere	Goodreads Choice Awards	Horror	Finalist	
2013	American Elsewhere	Shirley Jackson Award	Best Novel	Won	
2014	City of Stairs	Goodreads Choice Awards	Fantasy	Finalist	
2015	City of Stairs	British Fantasy Award	Best Fantasy Novel (the Robert Holdstock Award)	Shortlisted	
2015	City of Stairs	Locus Award	Best Fantasy Novel	Finalist	
2015	City of Stairs	World Fantasy Award	Best Novel	Nominated	
2016	City of Blades	Goodreads Choice Awards	Fantasy	Finalist	
2017	City of Blades	Locus Award	Best Fantasy Novel	Finalist	
2017	City of Miracles	Goodreads Choice Awards	Fantasy	Finalist	
2018	City of Miracles	Locus Award	Best Fantasy Novel	Finalist	
2018	The Divine Cities	Hugo Award	Best Series	Finalist	
2018	Foundryside	Goodreads Choice Awards	Fantasy	Finalist	
2019	Foundryside	British Fantasy Award	Best Fantasy Novel (the Robert Holdstock Award)	Shortlisted	
2019	Foundryside	Dragon Award	Best Fantasy Novel	Finalist	
2019	Foundryside	Locus Award	Best Fantasy Novel	Finalist	
2022	Foundryside	Grand Prix de l'Imaginaire	Foreign Novel	Finalist	
2022	Shorefall	Grand Prix de l'Imaginaire	Foreign Novel	Finalist	
2023	The Founders Trilogy	Hugo Award	Best Series	Finalist	
2024	The Tainted Cup	Goodreads Choice Awards	Fantasy	Finalist	
2025	The Tainted Cup	Hugo Award	Best Novel	Won	
2025	The Tainted Cup	World Fantasy Award	Best Novel	Won	
2026	A Drop of Corruption	Locus Award	Best Fantasy Novel	Finalist	
2026	A Drop of Corruption	Hugo Award	Best Novel	Finalist	

== Bibliography ==
=== Standalone novels ===
- Mr. Shivers (2010; Orbit)
- The Company Man (2011; Orbit)
- The Troupe (2012; Orbit)
- American Elsewhere (2013; Orbit)
- Vigilance (2019; Tordotcom)
- In the Shadows of Men (2020; Subterranean Press)

==== The Divine Cities trilogy ====
1. City of Stairs (2014; Broadway Books)
2. City of Blades (2016; Broadway Books)
3. City of Miracles (2017; Broadway Books)

==== The Founders trilogy ====
1. Foundryside (2018; Crown Publishing Group)
2. Shorefall (2020; Crown Publishing Group)
3. Locklands (2022; Crown Publishing Group)

==== The Shadow of the Leviathan series ====
===== Novels =====
1. The Tainted Cup (2024; Del Rey Books)
2. A Drop of Corruption (2025; Del Rey Books)
3. A Trade of Blood (2026; Del Rey Books)

===== Short stories =====
- The Lion's Tusk (2026; Amazon Publishing)
