= Andrew Pyper =

Canadian writer (1968–2025)

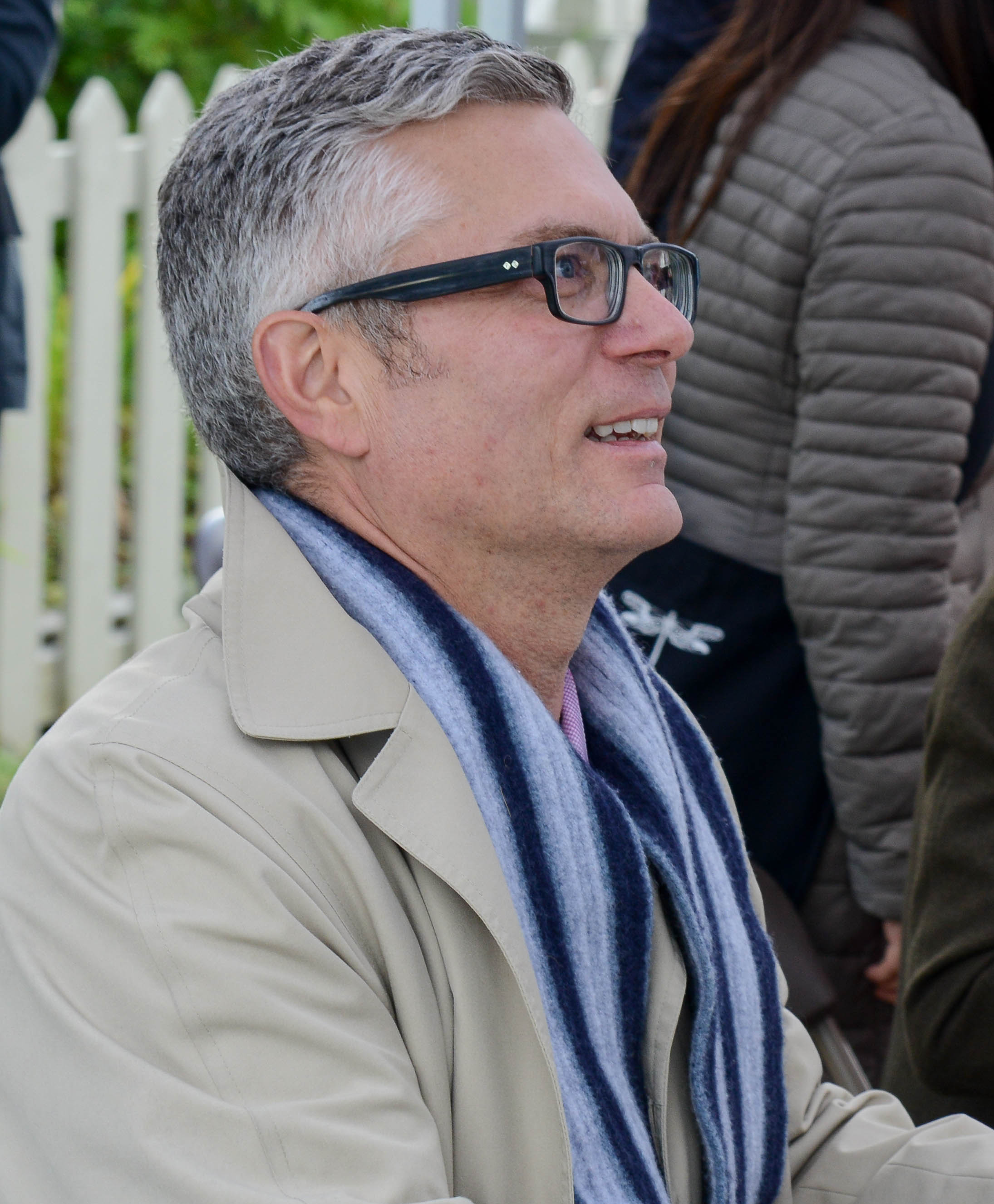
- Pyper in 2015
- Born: March 29, 1968; Stratford, Ontario, Canada
- Died: January 3, 2025 (aged 56); Toronto, Ontario, Canada
- Education: McGill University (B.A., M.A.); University of Toronto (LL.B.)
- Occupation: Novelist
- Spouse: Heidi Rittenhouse
- Children: 2
- Writing career
- Genres: Science fiction; thriller
- Website: andrewpyper.com

Andrew Pyper (March 29, 1968 – January 3, 2025) was a Canadian author whose novels blended the genres of thriller and science fiction. He published over ten works of fiction. The Andrew Pyper Award is named after him, to be awarded beginning in 2026 by the Writers' Trust of Canada.

== Life ==
=== Early life ===
Pyper's parents emigrated from Northern Ireland to Stratford, Ontario. His father was an ophthalmologist and his mother trained as a nurse. Pyper was the youngest of five children by eight years. As a child, he read a lot of books and aspired to be a writer.

=== Education ===
Pyper studied at McGill University in Montreal, Quebec, and obtained a B.A. and M.A. in English literature. Pyper followed his then-girlfriend to Toronto and studied law at the University of Toronto. Whilst attending law school, he had several short stories published in Canadian literary magazines, including Quarry and The New Quarterly.

Although the relationship ended, Pyper continued three years of legal studies and graduated with a law degree and earned a Legal Theory Award. He was called to the bar in 1996. He never practised law and publicly expressed his dislike for it. Before he had finished his articling year, Pyper decided to pursue a career as a fiction writer.

=== Personal life and death ===
Pyper was married to Heidi Rittenhouse, had two children, and lived in Toronto.

Pyper died at his home in Toronto of complications from intrahepatic bile duct cancer on January 3, 2025, at the age of 56.

== Career ==
Unbeknownst to Pyper, his editor at Quarry, Steven Heighton, sent a number of his short stories to John Metcalf, an editor at the Canadian publisher The Porcupine's Quill. Metcalf published them in a volume entitled Kiss Me, released in October 1996.

Pyper then obtained a writer-in-residence position at Trent University's Champlain College. While there he wrote his first novel, Lost Girls. It was published in Canada by HarperCollins in 1999 and became a Canadian bestseller. It was published by Delacorte Books in the U.S. and MacMillan in the U.K. in 2000. It was in the Top 10 on The Times' paperback bestseller list and in the Top 30 of The New York Times' paperback bestseller list. It was also translated and published in Italian, German, Dutch and Japanese. The book received widespread critical acclaim. The New York Times called it "elegant" and "brilliant".

The Trade Mission was Pyper's second novel. It was published in 2002 in Canada by HarperFlamingo, in the U.K. by Macmillan, and a year later in the U.S. by Scribner. It was also published in translation in Germany and the Netherlands. The Times called it "suspenseful" and The Globe and Mail's reviewer called it "breathtaking [...] a thriller with a serious centre."

His third novel, titled The Wildfire Season, was published in 2005 by HarperCollins in both Canada and the U.K. and by Thomas Dunne Books/St. Martin's Press in the U.S. a year later. It was also translated into Dutch and published in the Netherlands in 2005. The Barnes & Noble Review called it "a profoundly moving work of literature that succeeds on numerous levels", and The London Evening Standard described it as "outstanding."

The Killing Circle, Pyper's fourth novel, was published in 2008 by Doubleday in Canada, HarperCollins Publishers in the U.K., and Thomas Dunne Books in the U.S. It was also translated and published internationally in the Netherlands, Germany, France, Italy, Spain, Portugal, Japan and the Czech Republic. Publishers Weekly called the novel "an extraordinary thriller", and Booklist said of Pyper: "Few are better at conveying an omnipresent sense of dread and horror bubbling just beneath life's seemingly mundane routines."

Pyper's fifth novel was titled The Guardians and was published in 2011 by Doubleday in Canada and Orion in the UK. It was translated and published in both Italy and the Netherlands. The Guardian called it: "a compelling and genuinely creepy read", and it was chosen as a Best Book of the Year by the Dutch national newspaper NRC Handelsblad.

The Demonologist, Pyper's sixth novel, was published in Canada and the U.S. in March 2013 by Simon and Schuster, and in the U.K. by Orion. The novel was also translated and published in Greece, Holland, Bulgaria, China, Poland, Turkey, Taiwan, Spain, Russia, Italy, Brazil, Japan, Slovakia, the Czech Republic and France. Now magazine called Pyper "a star because he writes so spectacularly." The novel's film rights are held by Robert Zemeckis's company ImageMovers and Universal Pictures. The Demonologist was one of Publishers Weekly's Top Ten Mysteries & Thrillers of Spring 2013, an American Booksellers Association's Indie Next Pick for March 2013, and an Amazon Best Book of the Month for March 2013. It was one of Amazon.ca's and The Globe and Mail's Best Books of 2013.

Pyper's seventh novel, The Damned, was released by Simon and Schuster in North America in February 2015, and by Orion in the U.K. Translation rights have been sold to publishers in Russia and Italy. Kirkus Reviews called the novel a "treat for fans of intelligent treatments of the supernatural and rock-solid writing." It was named by DuJour as one of the Best Suspenseful Thriller Books of the Year.

While writing his major novels Pyper continued to write short stories.

Pyper taught creative writing courses at the University of Toronto and Colorado College.

The Homecoming was published in 2019 and The Residence in 2024.

Three further titles were published under the pseudonym Mason Coile: William (2024), Exiles (2025), and Driven (2026).

Following his death, the Writers' Trust of Canada announced the creation of the Andrew Pyper Award in his memory, which will honour works in speculative fiction genres such as horror, thriller or science fiction.

== Awards and nominations ==
Year	Nominated work	Award	Category	Result	Ref.
2000	Lost Girls	Arthur Ellis Award	Best First Novel	Winner	
2013	The Demonologist	Shirley Jackson Award	Best Novel	Finalist	
2014	The Demonologist	Libris Award	Author of the Year	Longlisted	
2014	The Demonologist	Libris Award	Fiction Book of the Year	Longlisted	
2014	The Demonologist	International Thriller Writers Award	Best Hardcover Novel	Winner	
2014	The Demonologist	Sunburst Award	Adult	Shortlisted	

== Selected works ==
- Kiss Me. Erin, Ontario: The Porcupine's Quill. 1996. ISBN 0-88984-181-0.
- Lost Girls. Toronto: HarperFlamingoCanada. 1999. ISBN 0-00-225502-2.
- The Trade Mission. Toronto: HarperFlamingoCanada. 2002. ISBN 0-00-200508-5.
- The Wildfire Season. Toronto: HarperCollinsCanada. 2005. ISBN 0-00-200562-X.
- The Killing Circle. Toronto: Doubleday Canada. 2008. ISBN 978-0-385-66369-4.

Andrew Pyper talking about The Guardians on Bookbits radio.

- The Guardians. Toronto: Doubleday Canada. 2011. ISBN 9780385663717.
- The Demonologist. New York, New York: Simon & Schuster. 2013. ISBN 978-1-4516-9752-0.
- The Damned. New York, New York: Simon & Schuster. 2015. ISBN 978-1476755113.
- The Only Child. New York, New York: Simon & Schuster. 2017. ISBN 978-1476755212.
- The Homecoming. New York, New York: Simon & Schuster. 2019. ISBN 978-1982108977.
- The Residence. New York, New York: Skybound Books. 2021. ISBN 978-1982147365.
- William. As Mason Coile. New York, New York: G.P. Putnam's Sons. 2024. ISBN 978-0593719602.
- Exiles. As Mason Coile. New York, New York: G.P. Putnam's Sons. 2025. ISBN 978-0593851630.
- Driven. As Mason Coile. New York, New York: Penguin Publishing Group. 2026. ISBN 9798217177103.
