= Shorefall =

2020 novel by Robert Jackson Bennett

- First edition
- Author: Robert Jackson Bennett
- Language: English
- Series: The Founders
- Genre: Fantasy
- Published: April 21, 2020
- Publisher: Del Rey
- Publication place: United States
- Media type: Print (hardcover and paperback), audiobook, e-book
- Pages: 512
- ISBN: 978-1524760380
- Preceded by: Foundryside
- Followed by: Locklands

Shorefall is a 2020 fantasy novel by Robert Jackson Bennett. It was first published by Del Rey on April 21, 2020. It is the second book of a trilogy that includes Foundryside (2018) and Locklands (2022).

== Plot ==
Several years after expert thief Sancia Grado and her allies Orso, Gregor, and Berenice established Foundryside, a fledgling merchant house dedicated to the large-scale production and distribution of sigils, the group continues its campaign to dismantle the entrenched power of Tevanne’s traditional merchant houses. By introducing more advanced and accessible scrived technologies to the public, they aim to erode the monopolies that have long controlled the city’s economy and to create a more equitable social order. However, their efforts face constant resistance, as the established houses view Foundryside not only as a commercial threat but as a direct challenge to the political and technological status quo.

The fragile progress achieved by the group is upended with the return of the ancient hierophant Crasedes Magnus, a figure from a distant past whose mastery of scriving far surpasses modern understanding. Unlike contemporary practitioners, who rely on structured inscriptions to manipulate reality, Crasedes possesses the ability to directly impose his will upon the physical world, effectively rewriting natural laws at scale. His rebirth, facilitated by factions seeking to exploit his power, quickly spirals beyond control, as he begins to assert dominance over Tevanne with the intent of imposing a rigid, ordered vision of society.

As Crasedes consolidates power, the city descends into crisis. Merchant houses fall or submit, and the population faces the prospect of subjugation under an entity capable of near-total control over reality. Sancia and her allies are forced into a desperate race against time, seeking to understand the deeper principles of scriving that underpin Crasedes’s abilities. Their survival—and the survival of Tevanne itself—depends on their ability to challenge not just his strength, but the foundational logic that sustains his power, before his vision results in widespread destruction and the collapse of the world they know.

By the novel's end, Tevanne has become embroiled in a war as the consciousness of Tevanne melded with Gregor fights Crasedes to seize control of the city. Orso sacrifices himself to allow Sancia and Berenice to escape across the sea where they hope to find help.

== Reception ==
Writing for Tor.com, Martin Cahill heaped praise for the "heart and intricate characters who love and care for each other", lauding it as a "stunning novel that shows exactly what [fantasy] can do." Kirkus Reviews labeled the novel an "expertly spun yarn", comparing it to "Tolkien meets A.I." and commending the blend between technology, philosophy, and fantasy. Shorefall was also a staff pick by Locus in December 2020.

Amal El-Mohtar praised the series in general, commenting on the "fantastic explorations of capital, empire, and collective action in intricately imagined words" with particular note that the "most recent instalment surpasses [the] preceding work, which is a tough thing to do."
