= Locklands =

2022 novel by Robert Jackson Bennett

- Author: Robert Jackson Bennett
- Language: English
- Series: The Founders
- Genre: Fantasy
- Published: June 28, 2022
- Publisher: Crown Publishing Group
- Publication place: United States
- Media type: Print (hardcover and paperback), audiobook, e-book
- Pages: 560
- ISBN: 978-1984820679
- Preceded by: Shorefall

Locklands is a 2022 fantasy novel by Robert Jackson Bennett. It was first published by Crown Publishing Group on June 28, 2022. It is the third and final book in The Founders trilogy, following Foundryside (2018) and Shorefall (2020).

== Synopsis ==
Locklands completes the story of Sancia Grado and her allies in the aftermath of the rise of the hierophant Crasedes Magnus. The city of Tevanne and the surrounding world have been destabilized, with traditional power structures weakened and the nature of scriving, once understood as a system of sigils used to manipulate objects, revealed to be part of a far deeper and more complex framework capable of altering reality itself.

Sancia, alongside Gregor Dandolo, Berenice “Berni” Hernandes, and the sentient key Clef, continues to resist Crasedes and the broader forces tied to the ancient system of scriving. As they seek to understand the true extent of this system, it becomes increasingly clear that Clef is not merely an artifact, but a fragment of a larger network that underpins the hierophants’ abilities.

The conflict expands beyond Tevanne as the group confronts the possibility that the underlying structure of reality can be accessed and changed. Crasedes’s influence persists, and the threat he represents is compounded by the broader implications of the ancient technologies he embodies. Sancia’s unique ability to perceive and interact with scrived objects evolves, allowing her to engage more directly with the foundational mechanisms of scriving.

As tensions escalate, Sancia and her allies work to prevent the consolidation of absolute control over reality. The struggle culminates in a confrontation that operates on both physical and conceptual levels, as they attempt to disrupt the forces that sustain the hierophants’ power.

By the end of the novel, the immediate threat posed by Crasedes is resolved, but the world is permanently altered. The understanding of scriving has expanded, and the balance between control and autonomy remains uncertain, leaving lasting consequences for Tevanne and beyond.

== Reception ==
Publishers Weekly was critical of the abrupt pace of the plot and the “nigh-incomprehensible” power levels of the characters, but positively commented on "the grounding themes of family and love", concluding that the book was a "satisfying end" to the series.

Kirkus Reviews gave a starred review, calling the story "Great fun, with nonstop action."

Tim Pratt of Locus dubbed the book "an excellent balance of big ideas, clever technological extrapolation... and compelling characters you really care about."

The book was also reviewed by Martin Cahill of Reactor and Catherine Baker of Strange Horizons.

The book, alongside the previous installments in The Founders Trilogy, were finalists for 2023 Hugo Award for Best Series.
