= Gemma Files =

Canadian horror writer, journalist, and film critic

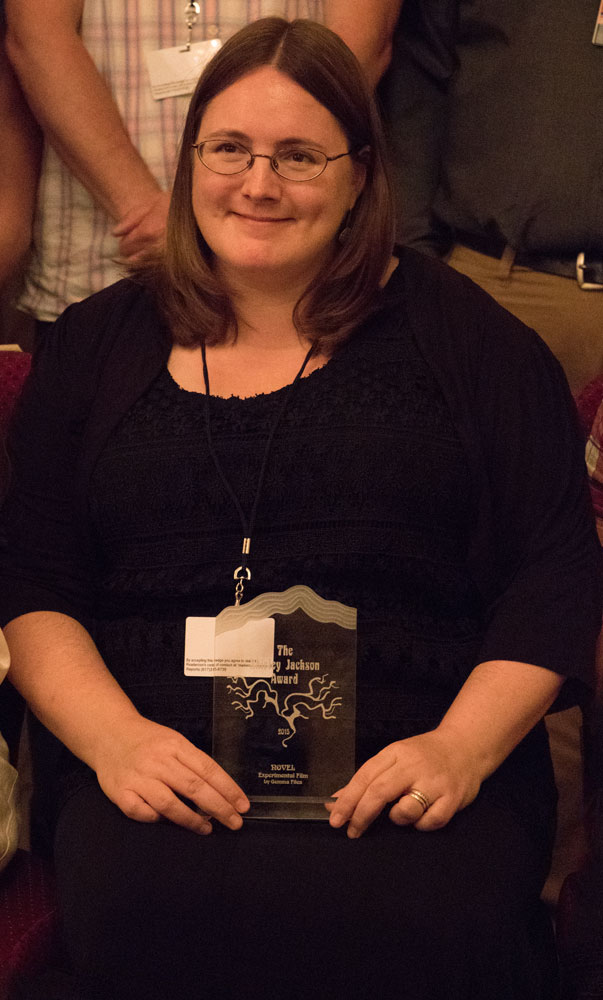
- Files at Readercon in 2016, holding her Shirley Jackson Award for Best Novel
- Born: April 4, 1968 (age 58); London, England
- Education: Ryerson Polytechnic University
- Occupation: Writer
- Writing career
- Language: English
- Years active: 1993 – present
- Genre: Horror
- Notable awards: International Horror Guild Award; Shirley Jackson Award; Sunburst Award

Gemma Files is a Canadian horror writer, journalist, and film critic. Her short story, "The Emperor's Old Bones", won the International Horror Guild Award for Best Short Story of 1999. Five of her short stories were adapted for the television series The Hunger.

== Biography ==
Gemma Files was born in 1968 in London to the actors Elva Mai Hoover and Gary Files. Her family relocated to Toronto in 1969. Files graduated from Ryerson Polytechnic University in 1991 with a degree in journalism. She published her first horror fiction, "Fly-by-Night" in 1993. Various freelance assignments eventually led to a continuing position with entertainment periodical Eye Weekly, where she wrote about the horror genre, independent films and Canadian cinema. She was listed by Cameron Bailey of NOW as one of the Top 10 Coolest People in Canadian Cinema for 1996.

In 2000 her award-winning story "The Emperor's Old Bones" was reprinted in The Year's Best Fantasy and Horror Thirteenth Annual Collection (ed. Terri Windling and Ellen Datlow). In 2010 her Shirley Jackson Award-nominated novelette "each thing i show you is a piece of my death" was reprinted in The Best Horror of the Year, Volume Two (ed. Ellen Datlow). Her short story "The Jacaranda Smile" was also a 2009 Shirley Jackson Award finalist.

Her first novel, A Book of Tongues, won the 2010 Black Quill Award for "Best Small Press Chill" from Dark Scribe Magazine; it was followed by the sequels A Rope of Thorns (2011) and A Tree of Bones (2012), together comprising her The Hexslinger series. A Rope of Thorns was considered a "powerful sequel" to A Book of Tongues by Publishers Weekly.

Her book We Will All Go Down Together (about a coven of witches and changelings) was given a favorable review by NPR.

Her novel Experimental Film (2015) won the Shirley Jackson Award for Best Novel and the Sunburst Award for Best Canadian Speculative Fiction (Novel) in 2016.

Files married science fiction and fantasy author Stephen J. Barringer (with whom she co-wrote "'each thing i show you is a piece of my death"") in 2002. They have one child.

== Bibliography ==
=== The Hexslinger series ===
- —— (2010). A Book of Tongues: Volume One in the Hexslinger Series. ChiZine Publications. ISBN 9780981297866.
- —— (2011). A Rope of Thorns: Volume Two in the Hexslinger Series. ChiZine Publications. ISBN 9781926851143.
- —— (2012). A Tree of Bones: Volume Three in the Hexslinger Series. ChiZine Publications. ISBN 9781926851570.
- —— (2013). The Hexslinger Omnibus (eBook ed.). ChiZine Publications. ASIN B00EXOT72Q.

=== Novels ===
- —— (2015). Experimental Film. ChiZine Publications. ISBN 9781771483490.

=== Collections ===
- —— (2003). Kissing Carrion: Stories. Prime Books/Wildside Press. ISBN 9781894815635.
- —— (2004). The Worm in Every Heart: Stories. Prime Books/Wildside Press. ISBN 9781894815765.
- —— (2014). We Will All Go Down Together: Stories of the Five-Family Coven. ChiZine Publications. ISBN 9781771482011.
- —— (2018). Spectral Evidence. JournalStone.
- —— (2018). Drawn Up from Deep Places. JournalStone.
- —— (2021). In That Endlessness, Our End. Grimscribe Press.
- —— (2023). Blood from the Air. Grimscribe Press.
- —— (2023). Dark Is Better. Trepidatio Publishing.
- —— (2025). Little Horn. Shortwave Publishing.

=== Poetry ===
- —— (2018). Invocabulary. Aqueduct Press.
