= City of Stairs =

2014 novel by Robert Jackson Bennett

- First edition, cover art by Sam Weber
- Author: Robert Jackson Bennett
- Language: English
- Publisher: Broadway Books
- Publication date: 2014
- Dewey Decimal: 813.6
- LC Class: PS3602.E66455 C58

City of Stairs is a 2014 fantasy novel by Robert Jackson Bennett. The first in his "Divine Cities" trilogy, it was published by Broadway Books.

== Synopsis ==
For centuries, the city-state of Bulikov used the magic of its patron deities to rule the world — until their vassal state Saypur killed the gods and conquered Bulikov. Decades later, a Saypuri historian is murdered while investigating Bulikov gods and magic, and the Saypuri colonial administration in Bulikov sends Ashara Komayd to investigate.

== Reception ==
City of Stairs was a finalist for the 2015 World Fantasy Award—Novel, the 2015 Locus Award for Best Fantasy Novel, and the 2015 British Fantasy Award for Best Fantasy Novel; as well, an analysis of the nominations for the 2015 Hugo Awards has shown that, if it were not for the involvement of the Sad Puppies, City of Stairs would have been a finalist for the Hugo Award for Best Novel.

In the New York Times, N. K. Jemisin lauded Bennett's worldbuilding, noting that Bulikov and Saypur "refreshingly" evoke "czarist Russia and Mughal India" rather than "staid medieval Europe", but considered that the book's "espionage and police-procedural components" were its "least interesting"; Jemisin also faulted the characterization of Komayd as a "cipher" who is "(made) more interesting by (the) reflected quirkiness" of her associates, but who "never quite leaps off the page." At Strange Horizons, Niall Harrison likewise praised the worldbuilding for its "coherency [and] completeness that precious few fantasies can match", and compared the violence and brutality of Komayd's assistant/bodyguard Sigrud to that of a Joe Abercrombie character. National Public Radio criticized Bennett for opening the novel with a lengthy courtroom scene in which (to the "extraordinary boredom (of) all the characters involved") a Bulikov merchant is prosecuted for illegally displaying the symbol of a dead god, but praised the pacing of the rest of the novel, calling Komayd and Sigrud "a post-feminist Fafhrd and the Gray Mouser."
