= Brian Evenson =

American academic and writer (born 1966)

- Evenson at World Fantasy Convention 2026
- Born: August 12, 1966 (age 60); Ames, Iowa, U.S.
- Education: Brigham Young University (BA); University of Washington (MA, PhD)
- Occupations: Novelist, professor
- Spouse: Connie Joyce Nelson (1989-2001) Kristen Tracy (2012-)
- Children: Valerie Ruth Evenson Mariana Sarah Annica Evenson Max Evenson
- Writing career
- Pen name: B. K. Evenson
- Genres: Literary fiction, popular fiction
- Notable works: Father of Lies; Last Days; Song for the Unraveling of the World
- Notable awards: Guggenheim Fellowship, 2017

Brian Evenson (born August 12, 1966) is an American academic and writer of both literary fiction and popular fiction, some of the latter being published under B. K. Evenson. His fiction is often described as literary minimalism, but who also draws inspiration from horror, weird fiction, detective fiction, science fiction and continental philosophy. Evenson makes frequent use of dark humor and often features characters struggling with the limits and consequences of knowledge. He has also written non-fiction, and translated several books by French-language writers into English.

Since 2016 he has taught in the School of Critical Studies at the California Institute of the Arts, both in the Creative Writing MFA program and in the Aesthetics and Politics MA Program.

== Biography ==
Brian Evenson was born August 12, 1966, in Ames, Iowa. His father, William Evenson, was a longtime professor of physics at Brigham Young University (BYU) and later an administrator there. As a young man, Brian Evenson served a two-year mission for the Church of Jesus Christ of Latter-day Saints (LDS Church) in France and Switzerland.

He received degrees from BYU (BA) and the University of Washington (MA and PhD). After leaving a teaching position at BYU, he held positions at Oklahoma State University, Syracuse University, and the University of Denver before being hired at Brown University. He was Professor of Literary Arts at Brown from 2003 to 2015.

=== BYU controversy ===
While teaching at BYU, Evenson was involved in a controversy surrounding his first book Altmann's Tongue (1994).

While a newly hired professor of creative writing at Brigham Young University (BYU), Brian Evenson published the story collection Altmann's Tongue, which included scenes of violence such as characters who are forced to eat mutilated tongues and who attempt to cut off their own limbs. Evenson stated the publishing contract for this book was a "significant factor" in his being hired, and he included some stories from the collection in his application to BYU. A graduate student complained anonymously to church leaders, claiming the work promoted the "enjoyment" of violence; Evenson responded by saying his fiction accentuated violence in an attempt to show its horror and "thus allow it to be condemned." Evenson's ecclesiastical leaders became involved in what he felt was a university personnel matter, and a senior faculty member planned to tell church authorities Evenson understood similar publications would "bring repercussions," but Evenson denied making such a statement. Evenson resigned from BYU in 1995, and left the church formally in 2000.

His case, along with others, was included in a report by the American Association of University Professors, which argued academic freedom was stifled at BYU.

== Writing style and influences ==
Evenson's Ph.D. is in both literature and critical theory, and his work is subtly philosophical, particularly influenced by continental philosophy. Many of Evenson's recurrent themes of virtuality and "sensation" are traceable to Deleuze & Guattari's Capitalism and Schizophrenia. Altmann's Tongue opened with an epigraph by Julia Kristeva; Dark Property featured quotes in untranslated German from Martin Heidegger; and several of Evenson's books have epigraphs from philosopher Alphonso Lingis. However, Evenson has stated that he intends any philosophical elements to be fully integrated into his fiction rather than promoting any particular viewpoint, and has argued that reading philosophical works directly is more rewarding than reading philosophy that is veiled as fiction.

Some of Evenson's work explores his Mormon heritage, often from a critical perspective or examining controversial subject matter. For example, the main character of The Open Curtain (2006) becomes preoccupied with a murder committed in the early 1900s by William Hooper Young, a grandson of 19th-century Mormon leader Brigham Young, while Immobility (2012) takes place in a post-apocalyptic Utah and features some esoteric elements of LDS theology. Nonetheless, Evenson has asserted that he maintains a measure of respect for devout believers in the LDS Church and does not intend to casually offend or provoke them.

Evenson's work has been compared to that of J. G. Ballard, Jorge Luis Borges, Paul Bowles, Franz Kafka, William S. Burroughs, Cormac McCarthy, Robert Coover and Edgar Allan Poe (among others). Evenson has expressed admiration for horror novelist Peter Straub, and for crime fiction in the hardboiled genre, both past masters like Dashiell Hammett and Jim Thompson, and contemporary practitioners like Andrew Vachss.

== Awards ==
- 1995 National Endowment for the Arts Creative Writer's Fellowship
- 1998 O. Henry Award for "Two Brothers"
- 2007 Edgar Award finalist for The Open Curtain
- 2007 International Horror Guild Award for The Open Curtain
- 2007 Shirley Jackson Award nomination for Last Days
- 2010 ALA/RUSA prize for Best Horror novel of 2009 for Last Days
- 2010 World Fantasy Award finalist (for 2009) for short story collection Fugue State
- 2017 Shirley Jackson Award nomination for The Warren
- 2017 Guggenheim Fellowship
- 2019 Shirley Jackson Award for Song for the Unraveling of the World
- 2020 World Fantasy Award for Song for the Unraveling of the World

== Bibliography ==
Brian Evenson is an author contributing to multiple fields.

=== Works of fiction ===
- Altmann's Tongue (1994, Knopf; Bison Books reprint 2002)
- Din of Celestial Birds (1997)
- Prophets and Brothers (1997)
- Father of Lies (1998; Coffee House Press reprint 2016)
- Contagion (2000)
- Dark Property (2002)
- The Wavering Knife: Stories (2004)
- The Open Curtain (2006; Coffee House Press reprint 2016)
- Aliens: No Exit (2008) as B. K. Evenson
- BABY LEG (2009) New York Tyrant Press
- Last Days (2009, Underland Press' debut novel, expanded from The Brotherhood of Mutilation; Coffee House Books reprint 2016)
- Fugue State: Stories (2009, Coffee House Press; with illustrations by Zak Sally)
- Dead Space: Martyr as B. K. Evenson (2010, Tor Books)
- Immobility (2012, Tor Books)
- Windeye: Stories (2012)
- Dead Space: Catalyst as B. K. Evenson (October 2012)
- The Lords of Salem as B. K. Evenson, with Rob Zombie (March 2013)
- A Collapse of Horses: Stories (2016, Coffee House Press)
- The Warren (2016, Tor)
- Feral, as B.K. Evenson, with James DeMonaco (2017, Anchor)
- The Deaths of Henry King, with Jesse Ball and Lilli Carré (2017, Uncivilized Books)
- "Gatekeeper" (short story), Whose Future is It?, chapter 2 (2018)
- "Abomata" (short story), Whose Future is It?, chapter 6 (2018)
- "Wanderers After The Light" (short story), Whose Future is It?, chapter 12 (2018)
- Song for the Unraveling of the World: Stories (2019, Coffee House Press)
- The Glassy, Burning Floor of Hell: Stories (2021, Coffee House Press)
- "The Fourth Scene" (short story), Howls From the Dark Ages (2022, HOWL Society Press)
- None of You Shall Be Spared (2023)
- Good Night, Sleep Tight (2024)
- Phantom Limb (2026)

=== Works of non-fiction ===
- Understanding Robert Coover (2003)
- Ed Vs. Yummy Fur (or, What Happens When a Serial Comic Becomes a Graphic Novel) (2014)
- Raymond Carver's What We Talk About When We Talk About Love (2018)
- Reports (Chapbook, 2018)
- Further Reports (Chapbook, 2024)

=== Works of translation ===
- "Painting" by Jean Frémon (1999)
- Introduction to The Passion of Martin Fissel Brandt by Christian Gailly [translated by Melanie Kemp] (2002)
- Giacometti: Three Essays by Jacques Dupin (2003)
- Mountain R by Jacques Jouet (2004)
- Red Haze by Christian Gailly [co-translated with David Beus] (2005)
- Electric Flesh by Christophe Claro (2006)
- "The Paradoxes of Robert Ryman" by Jean Frémon (2008)
- Donogoo-Tonka, or the Miracles of Science by Jules Romains (2009)
- Bunker Anatomy by Christophe Claro (2010)
- In the Time of the Blue Ball by Manuela Draeger [co-translated with Valerie Evenson] (2011)
- The Last of the Egyptians by Gerard Macé (2011)
- The Botanical Garden by Jean Frémon (2012)
- Incidents in the Night by David B. [co-translated with Sarah Evenson] (2014)
- Prisoner of the Vampires of Mars by Gustave Le Rouge [co-translated with David Beus] (2015)

=== Television work ===
- A Friend of the Family (2022; wrote two episodes: "The Bitter Cup" and "Revelation")
- Cape Fear (2026; wrote one episode: "Possum")

=== Video Game work ===
- The Under Presents

=== Recordings ===
- Altmann's Tongue by Brian Evenson with Xingu Hill & Tamarin (2005). Currently available from many legal mp3 sites (Amie Street, Emusic, iTunes, Amazon etc.). Also, available as a CD.
