= Between Two Fires (novel) =

2012 historical horror novel by Christopher Buehlman

- First edition
- Author: Christopher Buehlman
- Language: English
- Set in: France
- Publisher: Ace Books
- Publication date: 2 Oct 2012
- ISBN: 9781937007867

Between Two Fires is a 2012 historical fiction horror novel by Christopher Buehlman. Set during the Black Death, it follows a disgraced knight and a mysterious young girl who travel across France, as Lucifer and other fallen angels start another war with Heaven.

== Plot ==
Lucifer and the other fallen angels spark another war against Heaven by starting the Black Death. Demons roam the Earth and God appears to leave his angels and humanity to fend for themselves.

Thomas, a French knight turned brigand, saves a young girl named Delphine from being raped. After the Battle of Crécy, Thomas's lands were stolen by the Comte d'Évreux, and he was excommunicated. Delphine claims she can see angels and instructs Thomas to bring her to Paris and then Avignon. Along the way, they meet Father Matthieu, a gay alcoholic priest. Matthieu reminisces about how he was caught with another man, losing the trust of his congregation just before the plague struck; although this makes Thomas uncomfortable, Delphine reassures him that she does not care.

Delphine receives the Holy Spear from a man selling relics in Paris. As the group leaves the city, they are attacked by possessed statues of the Virgin Mary and various saints. The group have several more confrontations with fallen angels as they move toward Avignon. Matthieu is killed by a demon in the River Rhône. Thomas meets D'Évreux on the road and challenges him to a duel in which D'Évreux is eventually killed.

Disguised as D'Évreux and his page, Thomas and Delphine reach Avignon. They meet Matthieu's brother Robert, a servant and lover to an older cardinal. Delphine asks Robert to arrange a meeting with Pope Clement VI. Separately, she tells Thomas that the pope has been replaced by a demon and that they must kill him. Robert informs the pope. Delphine resurrects the true Clement, who confronts the false pope along with Delphine and Thomas. Thomas and Robert are killed. Delphine is killed by the Holy Spear, but Michael and the heavenly host emerge from her body to defeat the false pope and his army of demons.

Thomas's soul is dragged to Hell by the fleeing demons, where he is tortured. In another Harrowing of Hell, Delphine finds him and reveals that she is both Jesus and the young girl named Delphine. He awakens in his own body. Everyone except Thomas forgets the supernatural aspects of that night, believing the damage was from an earthquake. Thomas returns to Normandy, where he finds Delphine in her own village. She has no memory of their quest.

As an old man, Thomas is a Franciscan. He returns to the castle that was stolen from him. He speaks with his wife, but leaves the castle to visit his adopted daughter Delphine, now a nun.

== Major themes ==
Jason Golomb wrote that redemption and renewal are major themes of the novel. It also explores questions of why God allows disasters such as the Black Death to occur.

== Reception ==
Kirkus Reviews gave the novel a positive review, calling Buehlman "an author to watch" and stating that the novel "doesn't scrimp on earthy humor and lyrical writing in the face of unspeakable horrors". Publishers Weekly praised the characterization of Delphine and Thomas, writing that "fans of historical fantasy and horror will find this epic darkly rewarding."

Writing for Tor.com, Alyx Dellamonica praised the novel's prose, calling it an improvement on Buehlman's previous novel. Dellamonica also praised the novel's humorous dialogue which contrasts with the horrors of the world, as well as the novel's immersion in the "worldview and mindset of its medieval Christian characters." Writing for Shelf Awareness, Ron Hogan stated that Buehlman's ability to combine modern horror with a medieval setting allowed Buehlman to "[secure] his status among today's leading dark fantasy authors."
