= The Company Man (novel) =

2011 novel by Robert Jackson Bennett

- First edition
- Author: Robert Jackson Bennett
- Genre: Science fiction, Mystery, Fantasy
- Published: 2011
- Publisher: Orbit Books
- Pages: 464
- Awards: Edgar Award for Best Paperback Original (2012)
- ISBN: 978-0-316-05470-6
- Website: The Company Man

The Company Man (ISBN 978-0-316-05470-6) is a novel written by Robert Jackson Bennett and published by Orbit Books (now owned by Hachette Book Group) on 11 April 2011 which later went on to win the Edgar Award for Best Paperback Original in 2012.
