= Alison Rumfitt =

British author

- Born: November 25, 1998 (age 27)
- Education: University of Sussex
- Occupation: Writer
- Writing career
- Years active: 2021-present
- Genre: Horror
- Notable works: Tell Me I'm Worthless (2021); Brainwyrms (2023)

Alison Rumfitt is an English author. She has published two horror novels: Tell Me I'm Worthless (2021) and Brainwyrms (2023). Her style of writing has been considered part of "The New Gross", called "unabashedly transgressive", and compared with Daphne du Maurier, Angela Carter, and M.R. James in its exploration of "Englishness" through horror.

In addition to writing fiction, her poetry and short essays have been published in a variety of magazines, including datableed, The Final Girls, and Glass: A Journal of Poetry.

== Early life and education ==
Rumfitt, a transgender woman, studied English literature at the University of Sussex.

== Career ==
Rumfitt's debut novel Tell Me I'm Worthless was published in the US in January 2023 to positive reviews.

Her sophomore novel Brainwyrms followed in October 2023. It was similarly reviewed positively, receiving a gold star in its Library Journal review. The New York Times described it as, "made up of terse, glowering prose, and grimy sex scenes, the novel is perhaps best described as 'The Last of Us' dunked in the toilet bowl of Samuel R. Delany's impressively foul, taboo-shattering 'Hogg.' "

In 2024, it was revealed that Rumfitt had written a novelisation of the Doctor Who episode "Space Babies". It was released as a paperback on 8 August 2024 as part of the Target collection. An audiobook edition was released the same day.

In 2026, Rumfitt published a novella with the Eden Book Society, a literary hoax created by Dead Ink Books, alongside authors Grady Hendrix, John Darnielle, Nina Allan, Rowan Hisayo Buchanan and Chịkọdịlị Emelụmadụ. The six novellas were published pseudonymously, leaving readers to guess which author wrote which.

== Bibliography ==
=== Novels ===
- Tell Me I'm Worthless - (Cipher Press, 2021, UK and Tor Nightfire, 2023, USA)
- Brainwyrms (Cipher Press, 2023, UK and Tor Nightfire, 2023, USA)

=== Short stories ===
- Morbid Obsessions - with Frankie Miren (Cipher Press, 2022)
