= Brainwyrms =

2023 horror novel by Alison Rumfitt

- Author: Alison Rumfitt
- Language: English
- Genres: Horror; Body horror
- Publisher: Cipher Press (UK); Tor Books (US)
- Publication date: October 10, 2023
- Publication place: United Kingdom
- Pages: 304
- ISBN: 9781739220723

Brainwyrms is a 2023 body horror novel by the English author Alison Rumfitt, published by Cipher Press.

== Plot ==
Brainwyrms is divided into three sections. While most of the book is told in the third person, the narrative is occasionally interrupted by the author directly addressing the reader. Throughout the book, the flow of time is non-linear, and the thoughts and emotions of the characters are often conveyed through the use of flashbacks, dreams, and stream of consciousness.

=== Part One: Heartworms ===
Frankie, a British trans woman that works at a gender identification clinic, is the survivor of a terrorist attack at her workplace. Frankie is heavily involved in the London kink scene and fantasises about being impregnated. At a sex club, Frankie is drawn to a young enby called Vanya Niedzwiecki. After striking up a conversation about their fetishes, Frankie pulls Vanya into a bathroom stall and urinates on their face. Vanya stays the night at Frankie’s flat, and wakes up after Frankie has gone to her new job as a content moderator for a social media website. Panicking, Vanya calls their dom, Gaz, who tells them that they will be punished for their disobedience. Samantha, a self-professed transsexual, attends a meeting with a group of gender critical feminists. Jennifer Caldwell, a famous children's author that has been cancelled for expressing gender critical views, has been invited as an honoured guest. When Caldwell arrives, she expresses her contempt for Samantha's gender identity and naivety. It is revealed that Caldwell’s body is host to a colony of parasitic alien worms. As Samantha is “one of the good ones,” Caldwell tells her that she will be spared from the horrors that are to come. The members of the meeting descend on Samantha, and have sex with one another over her mutilated corpse.

=== Part Two: Gutworms ===
As their relationship with Frankie deepens, Vanya reminisces about their childhood. Vanya's older brother, who now lives in Poland, went unpunished for sexually assaulting them as a teenager. Vanya's mother, a care worker, is cold towards her child, and is disgusted by Vanya's weight and burgeoning sexuality. As a teenager, Vanya joins a message board for fetishists that deliberately infect themselves with parasites. Gaz, Vanya's future dom, welcomes them into the community. Vanya is groomed by Gaz into inserting fox faeces into their vagina. When the resulting infection hospitalises them, Vanya runs away to live with Gaz, who enables their self-infestation. Vanya's mother, who has become increasingly radicalised by anti-trans material on the internet, disowns them. In the present, Gaz throws a party at his father’s mansion for Vanya. Frankie is off-put by Gaz’s wealth, pomposity, and use of transphobic slurs. Gaz offers Frankie a drink and tells her that Vanya is waiting in one of the upstairs bedrooms. Frankie engages in cunnilingus with Vanya, but is horrified when she sees that Vanya’s vagina is infected with worms. Screaming obscenities at Vanya, Frankie locks herself in the bathroom, and passes out after trying to purge her body of the worms. Frankie wakes up to Vanya giving her a bath; Vanya tells her that she was hallucinating. When Frankie tells Vanya that Gaz spiked her drink, Vanya says that they were hurt by Frankie's behaviour, and asks her to never contact them again. Frankie enters a depressive spiral, and becomes addicted to doom scrolling. After several days of binge reading anti-trans posts on Twitter, Frankie posts a death threat towards Jennifer Caldwell.

Xavier, Vanya's trans younger brother, is a member of an LGBT+ youth group. His father is supportive, but he suggests to Xavier that he hides his attendance from his mother for the time being. After attending the group, Xavier comes home to find that his mother has beaten his father to death with a rolling pin. His mother reveals that she knew Xavier was attending the youth group behind her back, and she boasts that she blew up the gender identity clinic to stop him from transitioning. She stabs Xavier to death with a kitchen knife, and takes her own life by sinking the knife into her face.

=== Part Three: Brainworms ===
Frankie is fired after her death threat is picked up by The Times. As she sinks further into self-harm and suicidal ideation, a vodka billboard near Frankie’s flat featuring two trans women is set on fire. After drunkenly wandering to Gaz’s house, Frankie realises that she would not be welcome, and walks to a seedy gay bar for casual sex. After sharing her impregnation fetish with a man in the toilets, Frankie is slammed to the floor. The man covers Frankie's face with her tights, and she is bundled into a taxi to Gaz’s house. In the basement, Gaz and his father are hosting an orgy for some of the most influential figures in Britain, all of whom have been infected with the worms. Jennifer Caldwell attempts to impregnate Frankie and transport her to the worms’ home dimension. Frankie's face covering is removed, and the ritual is interrupted by Vanya when they recognise Frankie. Enraged that their offering is incapable of getting pregnant, Gaz tells the revellers to seize them, but Vanya and Frankie escape through a portal opened by Caldwell.

As they walk along the coastline of an alien world, Frankie’s stomach begins to swell, and she realises that the “pregnancy” has taken hold. An enormous white worm erupts from her abdomen and ascends into the sky, “an enemy that humanity could be united in its stand against it.” As Frankie lies dying on the beach, Vanya, ordered by Gaz to mother and nurse "The Great Oppressor" until it reaches maturity and can return to England "with all the hate against the world that it could carry", comforts the worm, singing it a lullaby.

== Background ==
The characters and events of Brainwyrms draw heavy inspiration from the history of the gender critical movement in the 2010s and early 2020s. Real-world British newspapers such as The Times and The Guardian are mentioned throughout the text, as is their alleged complicity in providing a platform for transphobic bigotry. J. K. Rowling, an English author that publicly aligned herself with gender critical figures in the late 2010s, shares several similarities with Jennifer Caldwell, the primary antagonist of the novel. Caldwell's best-selling book series about "a little girl and her witch friends," an innuendo of Rowling's Harry Potter series, made her a billionaire. Prior to her involvement in the gender critical movement, Caldwell was lauded for using her wealth to found a charity for sick children; an allusion to Lumos, a charity founded by Rowling in 2005. In Part Two, there is a reference to "an old sitcom about men working in an IT department." This is an allusion to The IT Crowd, a sitcom by the Irish gender critical activist Graham Linehan. Frankie, the transgender protagonist of the novel, describes her transition as "irreparable damage," a play on the title of Irreversible Damage by the American journalist Abigail Shrier.

== Reception ==
Megan Milks of The New York Times reviewed the book positively, calling it "smart, seething social horror that is forthright in its use of fiction to react to real-world terrors." Paula Lacey of The Skinny gave the book 4 stars out of 4, describing it as "an eviscerating exploration of queer dating and shame." Josh Hanson of FanFiAddict gave a critical review: "In the end, the allegory feels as weak as a biting internet comment, [...] and the ideas are finally not very interesting. Rumfitt’s analysis of TERF ideology as sexual fetish offers little more than warmed-over Freudianism."
