= Christopher Buehlman =

American novelist, comedian, playwright, and poet (born 1969)

- Born: February 22, 1969 (age 57); Tampa, Florida, U.S.
- Education: Florida State University
- Occupations: Novelist; comedian; playwright; poet
- Writing career
- Period: 1989–present
- Genres: Horror; fantasy; historical fiction; dark comedy
- Notable awards: Bridport Prize for poetry 2007 Wanton – winner

Christopher Buehlman (born February 22, 1969) is an American novelist, comedian, playwright, and poet from St. Petersburg, Florida.

== Early life and education ==
Buehlman was born in Tampa, Florida in 1969, to a woman originally from Tuscaloosa, Alabama. He was adopted by Joseph and Christeen Buehlman of St. Petersburg, Florida. He attended Thom Howard Academy, a school for gifted and special needs students, from 1973 until 1982, when he enrolled at Northeast High School as a sophomore. He graduated from Northeast in 1985 at the age of sixteen. He briefly attended the University of Florida that year, then completed an associate degree at St. Petersburg Junior College in 1989. He studied French language and History at Florida State University, graduating in 1994 with a bachelor's degree.

He speaks French with near fluency and is conversant in Spanish.

== Work ==
=== Performance ===
A lifelong fan of renaissance festivals, Buehlman developed an act called "Christophe the Insultor," in which he was paid by festival attendees to roast their friends. He toured with this act for 25 years. When it was a lane act, the material was period and PG-13, but as the act moved on stage and into festival taverns it got bluer, more modern, and wilder. The act has a strong cult following and its Facebook page has 19,000 followers as of March 2026.

Buehlman also wrote and performed a one-man show about Christopher Marlowe and a festival stage show called The Bastard Monks. He still performs his shows Filthy Irish Stories and Fat Shakespeare for the Sterling Renaissance Festival in the summer.

=== Literary ===
Buehlman's poetry has appeared in the Atlanta Review and other literary and university publications. He was a finalist in the 2006 War Poetry Contest and the 2008 Forward Prizes for Poetry list.

His first full-length play, Hot Nights for the War Wives of Ithaka, debuted at Jobsite Theater of Tampa in March 2012. He is the author of numerous other short plays.

He is the author of several novels, which range in setting from 14th century France to 1930s American South to modern-day New York.

Buehlman wrote the foreword to the 2022 Medieval horror anthology Howls From the Dark Ages.

=== Television ===
In 2018, Buehlman wrote a segment called "The Man in the Suitcase" for the Shudder reboot of Creepshow. It is described as "a nifty little tale of comeuppance...[which] delivers much of what's been missing with Shudder's show so far."

== Awards ==
- 2007 winner, Bridport Prize for poetry ("Wanton")
- 2011 nominee, World Fantasy Award for best novel (Those Across The River)
- 2014 nominee, Shirley Jackson Award for best novel (The Lesser Dead)

== Bibliography ==
Novels

- Those Across the River (Ace, 2011)
- Between Two Fires (Ace, 2012)
- The Necromancer's House (Ace, 2013)
- The Lesser Dead (Berkley, 2014)
- The Suicide Motor Club (Berkley, 2016)
- The Blacktongue Thief (Tor, 2021)
- The Daughters' War (Tor, 2024), a prequel to The Blacktongue Thief
- The Thrice-Bound Fool (Tor, 2026)

Plays

- The Last Neanderthals: A Paleolithic Comedy
- Hot Nights for the War Wives of Ithaka
- A Sodomite's Christmas in Elizabethan London
- Vulgar Sermons

Poetry

- "Bear Attacks"
- "Wanton"
- "Rapture"
- "Love Song for the Geminid Meteors"
