= The Lesser Dead =

2014 novel by Christopher Buehlman

- Author: Christopher Buehlman
- Audio read by: Christopher Buehlman
- Language: English
- Genre: Horror novel
- Set in: 1978
- Published: 2014
- Publisher: Berkley Books
- Publication place: United States
- Media type: Print, e-book, audiobook
- Pages: 368 pages
- Awards: ALA Best Horror Novel of the Year
- ISBN: 0425272613
- Preceded by: The Necromancer's House
- Followed by: The Suicide Motor Club

The Lesser Dead is a 2014 horror novel by American novelist Christopher Buehlman, who also provided the narration for the audiobook edition. The book was first published in the United States on October 7, 2014 through Berkley Books and centers around a group of vampires living underground in New York City.

In 2016, IM Global announced their intent to develop a television series based on the novel.

== Synopsis ==
The book is told from the viewpoint of Joey Peacock, a self-described unreliable narrator and vampire living in New York City during 1978. Joey was turned into a vampire when he was fourteen years old during the 1930s, by his parents' ex-cook Margaret, who turned him as an act of revenge for framing her for theft and getting her fired. While vampires do not age, their natural state resembles that of a corpse, making it necessary for them to use glamour-esque charm to project the image of life and health to humans and each other.

For about the last decade Joey has been living in an abandoned underground part of the city that connects to the subway system with Margaret and several other vampires such as Cvetko, an older looking vampire that is chronologically about the same age as Joey but occasionally treats him like a surrogate son. The group generally works together and lives by a set of rules created by Margaret, who serves as their leader. Joey goes about his undead life in a semi-regular pattern, which includes visiting the skeleton of a young girl he names Chloe in a small passage, that leaves him feeling a little bored with his existence until he witnesses a vampiric child charming a subway patron into leaving with him. He and the others soon discover that there are several such children, all of whom have a hunger for blood that is far larger than that of any of the other vampires. This causes Joey to question if the children are a different type of vampire entirely and the identity of the person who turned them, as turning children is heavily frowned upon by the vampires Joey is aware of. The group suspects that the children were turned by a long lived vampire known as the Hessian, who lives in seclusion elsewhere in the city. A few vampires living in the city, a Hispanic gang that owes obedience to Margaret, launches an unsuccessful attack on the Hessian, only for it to end with the death of almost every gang member. Meanwhile, many of the group's members begin to pity the children, as they're led to believe that they were turned for pedophilic purposes, and secretly feed them their own blood, including Joey.

It is eventually revealed that the children have been lying about their past and are far older than they've been leading the others to believe. The children are so old that their true forms are mummified corpses whose stomachs are riddled with holes, making it harder for them to feed, thus explaining their need to constantly feed. The children lied in order to cause chaos within the group and make it easier to kill them in order to take over their lair, a process that they've done on at least one other occasion, per some graffiti found within the lair that says "don't trust the children". The children kill or chase off every member of the group and initially try to enlist Joey to their side, as he still looks childlike and they only allow children to join their group, but are unsuccessful. Joey manages to escape and travels to Chloe's skeleton in response to a letter from Cvetko saying that he left some of Joey's belongings there, which he can use to escape the city, despite Joey suspecting that the letter was written under duress and that Cvetko is likely dead. Shortly after his arrival Joey is chased by the children, who drain him and ritualistically entomb Joey with Chloe. The book then shows Joey getting rescued by Cvetko, who explains that he became aware of the children's plans to drain and entomb Joey after seeing evidence of this in their belongings, especially as the evidence showed that Chloe was the victim of a similar ritual. The two travel to Boston, where they live together for a period of time until Joey meets a female vampire that looks young like him, with whom he travels the United States.

The book ends with an epilogue written by Cvetko, who reveals that he wrote the book based on Joey's journals. Joey was never rescued, as that portion was one that he added in order to give the book a happy ending. Cvetko has been caring for the children for a long time, as he sees them as a surrogate for the child he lost when he was still alive. He has also been infiltrating various vampire nests in order to find proper living environments and to discover any weaknesses that the children can exploit in order to more easily eliminate them. He then chastises the reader for potentially ignoring subtle signs that the work was written by him, that he was part of the children's plans, and that his given history and accent were false. He closes the book out by saying that he has assumed Joey's personality and that the book was written in order to make this process easier, so he can better trick others.

== Reception ==
The Lesser Dead was reviewed by Booklist and Publishers Weekly, the latter of which marked it as a starred review. Tor.com wrote a favorable review, closing it with the statement "If your idea of fun includes being seriously discomfited, grab up The Lesser Dead as soon as you can."

=== Awards ===
- ALA Best Horror Novel of the Year (2015, won)
