= Last Days (Evenson novel) =

2009 horror-mystery novel by Brian Evenson

- 2016 reissue cover
- Author: Brian Evenson
- Language: English
- Genre: Novel
- Publisher: Underland Press (first edition); Coffee House Press (reissue)
- Publication date: 2009
- Publication place: United States
- Media type: Paperback
- Pages: 256 p.
- ISBN: 978-0980226003

Last Days is a 2009 mystery-horror novel by Brian Evenson, first published by Underland Press. The first part of the book was originally published by Earthling Publications in 2003 as a novella titled The Brotherhood of Mutilation. The story follows a detective kidnapped by a religious cult who believe amputations bring one closer to God. Last Days won the American Library Association's award for Best Horror Novel of 2009.

In 2016, nonprofit independent publisher Coffee House Press reissued Last Days, featuring an introduction by horror novelist Peter Straub.

The novel received mostly positive reviews, with many critics noting the story's unique tonal blend of body and psychological horror with black humor. Some critics have compared the narrative to the work of pulp noir writer Raymond Chandler, describing it as a "send-up of the hardboiled detective novel".

== See also ==
- Body integrity dysphoria
- Matthew 5:30
- Paul Wittgenstein
- Skoptsy
