= American Elsewhere =

2013 novel by Robert Jackson Bennett

- Author: Robert Jackson Bennett
- Language: English
- Genre: Science fiction, horror
- Publisher: Orbit Books
- Publication date: February 12, 2013
- Publication place: United States
- ISBN: 978-0-316-20020-2

American Elsewhere is a 2013 science fiction-horror novel by Robert Jackson Bennett.

== Synopsis ==
After the death of her estranged father, police officer Mona Bright learns that her deceased mother had left her a house in a town called Wink, New Mexico. The town proves difficult to track down as it does not appear on maps and was once a government town that supported a local research laboratory. She soon realizes that there is something wrong with the town, and with her recollections of her childhood, and attempts to uncover its mysteries.

== Themes ==
The book is a science fiction novel with strong elements of horror. Critics noted that the novel's setting was a distorted vision of the "American Dream", and made comparisons to works such as The Stepford Wives, and Invasion of the Body Snatchers. The fictional town of Wink gives an outward appearance of obsessive normalcy which is predicated upon rigid gender norms, suburban neighborhoods and other features of mid-century Americana. This familiar setting is juxtaposed with supernatural and eerie occurrences to create a sense of horror. Lane Robins of Speculative Chic wrote that "Wink is mired in the pop culture of cocktails and green lawns and his and her social roles that Mother thought was appropriate." Jeff VanderMeer of Los Angeles Times described its denizens as "grotesque parodies of ordinary middle-class life".

Paul Simpson, writing for the Sci-Fi Bulletin, considered motherhood to be one of the novel's primary themes, in comparison to Bennett's earlier novel The Troupe which explored the relationship between fathers and their children.

== Reception ==
The book received generally positive reviews. Critics almost universally praised the first half of the novel, which deals with Bright's search for and early experiences in Wink, but the second half of the novel was more divisive. Stefan Raets of Tor.com wrote that "Together, the two parts form one cohesive story, but they’re so different in atmosphere and pace that it almost feels like reading two different novels." Kirkus Reviews described the second half as "increasingly far-fetched and repetitious explanations which ultimately prove far less fascinating than the conundrums" and described its finale as "absurd".

The book won the 2013 Shirley Jackson Award for Novel.
