= List of caves in Belize =

A cave is a natural opening in the ground stretching beyond the zone of light and large enough to permit the entry of a person. Some are found in cliffs at the edge of the coastline, chiseled away by the relentless pounding of waves and also by a variety of geological processes. Caves range from the size of a single small room to interlinked passages, miles long.

Below shows a list of some caves in Belize with known depths and lengths.

== Caves ==
Cave	Area	Depth (m)	Length (m)	Discovery Date	Discoverer
Actun A			7,000		
Actun Box Ch'iich'		-183			
Actun Check			4,500		
Actun Chapat Cave					
Actun Kabal	Chiquibul	-95	12,000		
Actun Loch Tunich (Black Hole Drop)					
Actun Lubul Ha	Boundary Fault, Caves Branch		3,750		
Actun Nab Nohol inferior			4,500		
Actun Tun Kul	Chiquibul	160	39,000		
Actun Tunichil Muknal	Boundary Fault, Cayo District		5,300		
Barton Creek Cave	Barton Creek		8,000		
Che Chem Ha Cave				1989	William Morales
Chiquibul Cave System	Chiquibul	-95	58,000		
Crystal Cave	St. Herman's Blue Hole National Park				
Flour Camp Cave					
Great Blue Hole		124			
Caves Branch Cave					
Yit Ha (Rio Blanco sink) - Hokeb Ha Cave (Blue Creek Cave)	Rio Blanco - Blue Creek, Toledo District		9,000		
Laguna Cave					
Midnight Terror Cave				2006	
Nohoch Che'en					
Petroglyph Cave - St Herman's Cave	Boundary Fault, Caves Branch		17,000		
Rio Frio Cave	Mountain Pine Ridge Forest Reserve				
Tiger Cave (Tich Hulz)	Rio Grande, Toledo District		5,078		
Pueblo Creek Cave - Ochochpec	Pueblo Viejo - Aguacate, Toledo District		7,000		
Yux Ta'Ha	Rio Grande, Toledo District		3,000		
AC Cave	Bladen, Toledo District		4,000		

== See also ==
- List of caves
- Speleology
