= Paul (surname) =

Paul is an English, French, German, and Hindu surname.

This surname has two distinct and separate origins:

Amongst Christians, it is a surname based on naming traditions mainly related to Paul the Apostle.

Amongst Hindus, Paul is an anglicized form of "Pala" stemming from British India censuses, meaning protector in Sanskrit. The original surname, Pala, originates from Gopala I and the Pala Dynasty. The surname is common amongst Bengali Kayasthas of India and Bangladesh.

People with the surname include:

== A ==
- Aaron Paul (born 1979), American actor
- Adolf Paul (1863–1942), Swedish novelist and playwright
- Adrian Paul (born 1959), English actor
- Agnimitra Paul (born 1973), Indian fashion designer
- Aloke Paul (born 1973), Indian scientist
- Amala Paul (born 1991), Indian film actress in Tamil and Malayalam cinema
- Andreas Paul (born 1978), German politician
- Angad Paul (1970–2015), British-Indian businessman and film producer
- Anindita Paul (born 1979), Indian singer
- Aislinn Paul (born 1994), Canadian actress
- Alexandra Paul (born 1963), American actress
- Alexandra Paul (figure skater) (1991–2023), Canadian figure skater
- Alice Paul (1885–1977), American suffragist leader, feminist and women's rights activist
- Andrus Paul (born 1975), Estonian luger
- Annamie Paul (born 1972), Canadian politician, activist and lawyer, sister of Ngozi Paul
- Art Paul (1925–2018), American graphic designer
- Aubrey Dean Paul (1869–1961) English baronet and Army captain

== B ==
- Beena Paul (born 1961), Indian film editor in Malayalam
- Brandon Paul (born 1991), American basketball player
- Brian Dean Paul (1904–1972), English baronet
- Brenda Dean Paul (1907–1959), English silent film actress, socialite
- Bruno Paul (1874–1968), German architect, interior designer, and furniture designer
- Butch Paul (1943–1966), Canadian ice hockey player

== C ==
- Carrick Paul (1893–1919), New Zealand World War I flying ace
- Chris Paul (born 1985), American basketball player
- Chris Paul (offensive lineman) (born 1998), American football player
- Chris Paul Jr. (born 2002), American football player
- Christi Paul, American news anchor

== D ==
- Daniel Paul (1943–2023), French politician
- Daniel N. Paul (1938–2023), Canadian Miꞌkmaq elder, author, columnist, and human rights activist
- David L. Paul (1939–2022), American banker and real estate developer
- Don Paul (defensive back) (1926–2001), American football player
- Don Paul (linebacker) (1925–2014), American football player
- Don Michael Paul (born 1963), American movie director
- Doreen Paul (born 1962), Dominican banker and politician

== E ==
- Edy Paul (born 1951), Swiss slalom canoeist
- Eddie Paul (1948–2016), American car designer and inventor
- Ellen Paul, American politician
- Ellis Paul (born 1965), American singer-songwriter and folk musician
- Enema Paul (died 2024), Nigerian politician

== F ==
- Frank R. Paul (1884–1963) Austro-Hungarian-born American science fiction illustrator
- Fritz Paul (1942–2025), German philologist

== G ==
- Gregory S. Paul (born 1954), American paleontological researcher and writer
- Sir George Paul, 2nd Baronet (1746–1820), English baronet, prison reformer and philanthropist

== H ==
- Hamilton Paul (1773–1854), Scottish Presbyterian minister and writer
- Harry Paul (1886–1948), Scottish footballer
- Henri Paul, French driver of the car in which he, Princess Diana, and Dodi Fayed were killed
- Herieth Paul (born 1995), Tanzanian-Canadian fashion model
- Hermann Paul (1846–1921), German linguist

== J ==
- Jacob Paul (born 1995), British hurdler
- Jai Paul (born 1988), British recording artist
- Jake Paul (born 1997), American boxer
- James Paul (conductor) (born 1940), American conductor
- James Paul (footballer) (fl. 1930s), Scottish footballer
- James A. Paul (born 1941), American writer and non-profit executive
- James Balfour Paul (1846–1931), Scottish nobleman
- James Patten Paul (1817–1891), Mormon pioneer
- James Paul (cricketer) (1888–1937), Argentine cricketer
- James Allen Paul (1947–2000), American spree killer
- Jay Paul, American billionaire Silicon Valley real estate investor
- James Balfour Paul (1846–1931), Lord Lyon King of Arms, the officer responsible for heraldry in Scotland
- Jayson Paul (born 1984), birth name of JTG, American professional wrestler
- Jean Baptiste Paul (1896–1966), Canadian First Nations wrestler
- Jean Paul (cricketer) (born 1985), West Indian cricketer
- Jeff Paul (born 1978), Canadian ice hockey player
- John Paul (disambiguation), several people
- Josefine Paul (born 1982), German politician
- Josh Paul (disambiguation)
- Joyce Paul (1937–2016), American country music singer
- Justin Paul (scholar), Professor of business administration

== K ==
- Keitumetse Paul (1973–2021), Botswanan footballer

== L ==
- Laurie Ann "L. A." Paul (born 1966), American professor of philosophy and cognitive science
- Leah Paul (born 1999), Irish cricketer
- Lee Paul (1939–2019), American film and television actor
- Les Paul (1915–2009), American guitarist, songwriter, luthier, and inventor
- Lewis Paul (died 1759), English Huguenot, inventor of roller spinning,
- Logan Paul (born 1995), American actor and Internet personality
- Lynsey de Paul, (1948–2014), English singer-songwriter

== M ==
- Maniesh Paul (born 1981), Indian actor, comedian, anchor, TV show host
- Markus Paul (1966–2020), American football coach and player
- Matthias Paul (actor) (born 1964), German actor
- Matthias Paul (DJ) (born 1971), German DJ, producer and musician known as Paul van Dyk
- Maanu Paul (1938–2022), New Zealand Māori leader
- Mihai Paul (born 1982), Romanian basketball player
- Mike Paul (born 1945), American baseball player

== N ==
- Nanette B. Paul (1866–1928), American legal scholar, lawyer, suffragist, author, instructor, and lecturer
- Ngozi Paul, Canadian screen actress, writer, director and producer; younger sister of Annamie Paul
- Nick Paul (born 1995), Canadian ice hockey player
- Nigel Paul (cricketer) (1933–2022), English cricketer
- Nigel Paul (boxer) (born 1989), boxer from Trinidad and Tobago

== P ==
- Pamela Paul (born 1971), American journalist and author
- Patrick Paul (born 2001), American football player
- Peter Paul (disambiguation)

== R ==
- Rand Paul (born 1963), American ophthalmologist and politician
- Richard Paul (actor) (1940–1998), American actor
- Randy Paul (actor) (1960–2020), American actor and model
- Reagan Paul, American politician
- Ron Paul (born 1935), American physician and US Representative; father of Rand
- Roselyn Paul, Dominica politician
- Rusty Paul (born 1952), American politician

== S ==
- Saju Paul (born 1966), Indian politician
- Satya Paul (fl. 1985–?), Indian fashion designer
- Shermar Paul (born 1997), Canadian rapper, songwriter and record producer known professionally as Night Lovell
- Sean Paul (born 1973), Jamaican deejay, singer, and rapper
- Sohini Paul (born 1986), Bengali actress, daughter of Tapas Paul
- Swraj Paul, Baron Paul (1931–2025), Indian-born British business magnate and philanthropist

== T ==
- Tamatha Paul (born 1997), mayor of Wellington, New Zealand
- Tapas Paul (1958–2020), Indian Bengali actor and politician
- Thomas Paul (disambiguation) several people
- Tom Paul (politician) (1874–1964), New Zealand compositor, trade unionist, politician, editor, journalist and censor
- Tom Paul (footballer) (1933–2015), English footballer
- Tommy Paul (boxer) (1909–1991), American boxer
- Tommy Paul (tennis) (born 1997), American tennis player

== V ==
- Valerie Paul, American marine ecologist

== W ==
- William Paul (minister) (1754–1802), Chaplain in Ordinary to King George III
- Willie Paul (footballer) (1866–1911), Scottish footballer

== X ==
- Xavier Paul (born 1985), American baseball player

== See also ==
- De Paul (surname)
- Paul (given name)
- Paul (disambiguation)
- Jean Paul, German writer Johann Paul Friedrich Richter (1763–1825)
- McPhail, a surname
- MacPhail, a surname
- Clan MacPhail, a Scottish Highland clan
- Jay Paul Company, a real estate development company based in Northern California
- Pal (surname), a common surname in India and Bangladesh
