= McPhail =

McPhail or MacPhail is a surname. Notable people with the surname include:

== McPhail ==
- Addie McPhail (1905–2003), American film actress
- Alastair McPhail, British diplomat, the first British ambassador to South Sudan
- Alexander James McPhail (1883-1931), Scottish-Canadian agricultural reformer
- Andy McPhail, Scottish rugby league footballer who played in the 2000s
- Billy McPhail (1928–2003), Scottish footballer
- Bob McPhail (1905–2000), Scottish international footballer
- Bob McPhail, English rugby union, and rugby league footballer who played in the 1900s
- Bruce McPhail (1937–2020), New Zealand rugby player
- Carlton McPhail Sr. (born 1947), Basketball and Football Coach
- Dan McPhail (1903–1987), Scottish professional footballer
- David McPhail (1886–?), New Zealand rugby league footballer who played in the 1900s and 1910s
- David McPhail (1945–2021), New Zealand actor
- Donna McPhail, British comedian, TV presenter, journalist
- Douglas McPhail (1914–1944), American actor and singer
- George Wilson McPhail (1815–1871), Presbyterian minister, president of Lafayette College, and Davidson College.
- Hal McPhail (1912–1977), American football player
- Jerris McPhail (born 1972), former professional American football player
- John McPhail (disambiguation)
- Larry McPhail (born 1968), retired American soccer forward
- Malcolm McPhail (1895–1975), Scottish footballer
- Marnie McPhail (born 1966), Canadian-American actress
- Michael McPhail (born 1981), American Olympic rifle shooter
- Sharon McPhail (born 1948), American lawyer and politician
- Stephen McPhail (born 1979), Republic of Ireland international footballer

== MacPhail ==
- Agnes Macphail (1890–1954), Canadian feminist and first woman to be elected to the Canadian House of Commons.
- Alesha MacPhail, murder victim
- Andrew Macphail (1864–1938), Canadian physician, author, professor of medicine and soldier.
- Andy MacPhail (born 1953), president of baseball operations for the Baltimore Orioles and son of the former American League president Lee MacPhail and grandson of Larry MacPhail.
- Angus MacPhail (1903–1962), English screenwriter known for his work with Alfred Hitchcock; credited with the creation of the term "MacGuffin"
- Catherine Macphail (born 1964), Scottish-born author
- Dan Macphail, fictitious engineer of the Vital Spark
- Dugald MacPhail (1818-1887) Gaelic songwriter, poet and author from Strathcoil on Mull
- Dugald MacPhail, one of the last survivors of the Battle of Isandlwana in 1879 when serving as part of the Buffalo Border Guard
- Iain Macphail, Lord Macphail (1938–2009) Scottish lawyer, Senator of the College of Justice, Judge of the Supreme Court
- John MacPhail (born 1955), former Scottish footballer
- Joy MacPhail (born 1952), former Canadian New Democratic Party of British Columbia politician
- Karin MacPhail, American Episcopal bishop
- Katherine Stewart MacPhail (1887-1974), Scottish Surgeon
- Larry MacPhail (1890–1975), American executive and innovator in Major League Baseball
- Lee MacPhail (1917–2012), former administrator in Major League Baseball
- Mark MacPhail (died 1989), police officer and murder victim
- Robert Lloyd George MacPhail (1920–1995), Canadian politician and the 36th Lieutenant Governor of Prince Edward Island; Member of the Order of Canada
- William S. MacPhail (fl. 1900s), namesake of the MacPhail Center for Music in Minneapolis, Minnesota

== See also ==
- Mount McPhail, Canada
- Cobden/Bruce McPhail Memorial Airport, Ontario, Canada
- McPhail Angus Farm
- McPhail Memorial Baptist Church, Ottawa, Canada
- Fergus McPhail, Australian children's television programme
- McPhail v Doulton (1970), landmark English trusts law decision by the House of Lords
- Paul, a surname
- Clan MacPhail, the Sons of Paul, a Scottish highland clan
- Gordon & MacPhail whisky
- Southern Alberta Institute of Technology MacPhail School of Energy
