= List of University of Brighton alumni =

This is a list of notable alumni of the University of Brighton.

== Acting ==
- Chris Barrie, actor and impressionist
- Paddy Considine, actor
- Adam Pearson, actor, TV presenter, and campaigner
- Pooja Shah, actress and model

== Artists and authors ==
- Jane Carpanini, artist
- Graham Duff, writer, actor, and producer
- Polly Dunbar, author and illustrator
- Emily Gravett, children's book illustrator and author
- Sophie Green, artist
- Mini Grey, children's author and illustrator
- Sue Hendra, children's book author and illustrator
- Juliet Kac, artist and teacher
- Simon Kernick, crime fiction writer
- Akira Kuroda, novelist and critic
- Alison Lapper, artist and author
- Simone Lia, cartoonist and author
- Kathryn Maple, artist
- Ṣọlá Olúlòde, artist
- Molly Parkin, painter and journalist
- John Pasche, art designer, including The Rolling Stones tongue & lip motif
- Peepshow Collective, Emmy award-winning group of visual artists
- Philip Reeve, children's author and illustrator
- Louise Rennison, author and comedian
- Chris Riddell, author and illustrator, cartoonist for The Observer newspaper
- Keith Tyson, artist and Turner Prize winner 2002
- Rachel Whiteread, artist and Turner Prize winner 1998
- Cliff Wright, artist and illustrator

== Music ==
- Norman Cook, DJ, musician, and producer
- Natasha Khan, musician, Bat for Lashes
- Joseph Mount, musician and founding member of Metronomy
- Orlando Weeks, musician, The Maccabees

== Photography ==
- Stuart Griffiths, photographer
- Mark Power, Magnum photographer
- John Rankin Waddell (Rankin), portrait and fashion photographer

== Sport ==
- Kate Allenby, modern pentathlon, bronze medallist at the 2000 Summer Olympics
- Gillian Clarke, Olympic hockey umpire at three Olympic games
- Ben Hawes, Great Britain field hockey team at the 2008 Summer Olympics
- David Luckes, Great Britain hockey player who participated in three Summer Olympics (1992, 1996 and 2000) and Head of Sport Competition for the 2012 Summer Olympics
- David Stone, Paralympic bicyclist, won two gold medals at the 2008 Summer Olympics
- Tanya Streeter, world champion free diver

== Other ==
- Holly Budge, adventurer, conservationist, co-founder of the charity "How Many Elephants"
- Mandy Chessell, computer scientist and Fellow of the Royal Academy of Engineering
- Ethel Delali Cofie, Ghanaian businesswoman
- Ben Cooper, controller, Radio 1 and 1Xtra
- Keren Craig, Marchesa designer
- Addison Cresswell, celebrity agent
- Matthew Dent, designer of the current British coinage
- Harvey Goldsmith, performing arts promoter
- David Hallam, Member of the European Parliament
- Barbara Hulanicki, founder of Biba
- Mark Hunt, President of the Institution of Mechanical Engineers
- Anji Hunter, Baroness Hunter of Auchenreoch, Labour peer
- Saira Khan, TV presenter and businesswoman
- Sue Law, Head of Equality and Child Protection, The FA Group
- Ann Ledwith, academic administrator
- Julien Macdonald, designer
- Jill McDonald, CEO of Halfords
- George Mallen, pioneer of creative computer systems and businessman
- Justin Paul, University of Puerto Rico professor
- Martin Webb, entrepreneur and TV business mentor
- Jo Whiley, DJ and TV presenter
- Riza Yunos, Bruneian government minister
