= Diane S. Littler =

Diane Scullion Littler
- Born: 1945 (age 80–81)
- Education: University of Hawaiʻi, Pacific Western University
- Known for: Relative Dominance theory, Functional Morphology, Complex top-down vs. Bottom-up interactions in coral-reef systems, Marine biology, Coral Reef ecology, Taxonomy of tropical macroalgae, Environmental monitoring and Conservation biology, Deep-sea Algal ecology
- Spouse: Mark Masterton Littler
- Awards: Women's Diver Hall of Fame, Gerald W. Prescott Prize, American Academy of Underwater Sciences Lifetime Achievement Award,
- Scientific career
- Fields: Phycology, Biosystematics, Ecology, Marine Botany and Phycology, Coral Reef Ecology, Functional Morphology and Evolution of Marine Algae, Systematics and, Taxonomy of Tropical Macroalgae,
- Workplaces: Smithsonian Institution, Harbor Branch Oceanographic Institution
- Academic advisors: Max Dory, Izzie Abbot
- Doctoral students: Keith Arnold, Frederic Briand, Mark Hay
- Website: https://www.gulfbase.org/people/dr-diane-s-littler

Diane Scullion Littler (born 1945) is an American marine botanist and phycologist, known for her extensive research on marine algae, particularly in tropical reef ecosystems, often in partnership with her late husband, Mark M. Littler (1939–2023). Throughout her career, which had spanned over three decades, she has made significant contributions to the taxonomy, ecology, and physiology of macroalgae worldwide. The Littlers have authored over 195 publications, including peer-reviewed journals and field guides, alongside her husband. She has held research positions at the Harbor Branch Oceanographic Institute, the Florida Atlantic University, the University of California, Irvine, the University of Hawaiʻi, and the Smithsonian Institution. She is also a member of the Phycological Society of America, International Society for Reef Studies, and the European Phycology Society.

== Life ==
=== Early life and education ===
Diane S. Littler was born in 1945. As a child, she excelled at golf and often explored the forests near Salem, Ohio. As a result, she had an appreciation for nature early on in her life. As she matured, she initially pursued a career in forest ecology, taking an interest in terrestrial ecosystems. She had attended Ohio University, where she met Mark, her future husband and research partner, while he was a teaching assistant for the phycology class she was taking. Influenced by Mark, she expanded her interest in forest ecology to include aquatic ecosystems, specifically seaweeds. After her marriage to Mark, they both attended the University of Hawaiʻi, where they both benefitted from the institution's in-depth curriculum in marine algal ecology. While there, she was trained under a renowned oceanographer, Max Doty. She had earned her Bachelor's of Science while studying there. After earning her Bachelor's degree, she obtained both her Master's and Doctorate degrees, focusing on the function of morphology of marine algae at the Pacific Western University in 1982.

=== Career ===
Littler first began her career as a scientist under renowned oceanographer Max Doty at the University of Hawaiʻi, alongside her late husband, Mark M. Littler. Together, they learned more about coral reef ecology and state-of-the-art research methods and approaches to research. She then went on to co-direct large ecological research programs that specifically focused on rocky intertidal ecosystems at the University of California, Irvine. She held the position of senior scientist, later adjunct senior scientist, with the Harbor Branch Oceanographic Institution at the Florida Atlantic University prior to joining the Smithsonian Institution in 1982, where she is now a research associate. She and Mark began to work with their colleague Barrett Brooks, and formed a deep-sea research team certified to dive to depths of 65 meters, allowing flexibility in terms of research, documentation, and exploration of life in remote and diverse habitats. For example, she and her team have conducted a survey along the Moroccan coast to determine if the funding from the International Finance Corporation of the World Bank towards a new algal harvesting industry was feasible. Since then, her scientific career has been marked with over 2,000 ship-based scuba excursions across global coral reef ecosystems and oceanographic cruises to conduct effective and efficient surveys in remote regions.

== Research and contributions ==
=== Relative dominance model and theory ===
Co-developed with Mark M. Littler, this model assesses how different types of sessile photosynthetic organisms (coral to algae) dominate coral reef systems, depending on nutrient levels, herbivore activity, physical disturbances, and external impacts such as pollution and overfishing. This model has been a cornerstone in reef biogenesis and management.

=== Marine algal functional morphology and evolution ===
Marine algal functional morphology and evolution is a field pioneered by Diane S. Littler, which examines the relationsihp between the structural form and traits of benthic macroalgae influence and their ecological performance in marine environments. Her research established a cost-benefit model that links algal thallus architecture to key functions such a photosynthesis, nutrient absorption, and defense against herbivory. Her research demonstrated that variations in algal form – ranging from filamentous to folise [sic?] and calcified types – correlate with survival strategies, productivity, and competitive interactions across reef ecosystems. Building on this framework, both Diane and Mark demonstrated that macroalgal form groups are strongly correlated with substratum stability and disturbance regimes, showing that delicate, fast-growing forms dominate unstable habitats while tougher, slow growing morphologies thrive in stable environments. These findings have been the foundation in understanding the algal roles in coral reef resilience, biodiversity, and ecosystems shifts driven by top-down and bottom-up forces.

=== Deep-sea discovery ===
==== Purple coralline algae ====
In a deep-sea excursion near the Bahamas, Littler and Mark M. Littler discovered a community of macroalgae thriving at record depths of 884 feet – far below the previously accepted photosynthetic limit of 700 feet. The discovery of a purple coralline algae surviving on 0.0005% of surface sunlight challenged textbook assumptions about the light requirements for marine plant life. Their findings sparked interdisciplinary research across oceanography, geology, and marine biology. The discovery of this purple coralline algae has been featured and published in textbooks and scientific literature, opening a new frontier in biological oceanography.

==== Giant Anadyomene ====
2009, Diane and Mark, along with divers Barrett Brooks, Cameron Brooks, Antonio Baeza, and Carla Piantoni, had identified a previously undocumented green alga species, Anadyomene sp. nov., off the coast of Belize. This species had formed an expansive net of five meters long, which was previously was not recorded in the year prior. This species closely resembled a rare Floridian species of A. pavonina. It has been previously noted that species in the Anadyomene genus were known to form individual clumps, but the unidentified species they found had displayed higher resistant to marine life grazing. They has observed that this species is the most abundant at depths of 25 to 50 kilometers deep, and that only four percent of Anadyomene was consumed compared to Acanthophora spicifera being 77 percent consumed, which supports the high resistant to marine grazing.

=== Biotic-reef pathology ===
==== Coralline-Lethal Orange Disease ====
In 1995, Diane and Mark documented and researched the impact of Coralline-Lethal Orange Disease (CLOD), a cyanobacterial pathogen that is responsible for widespread coral mortality throughout the Pacific Reefs. This bacterium was first observed at Cook Islands in 1993, but it has since spread to the South Pacific reefs over a range of 6,000 kilometers. The presence of CLOD in the Great Astrolabe Reef had exponentially increased from 0% (1992) to full saturation by 1993. Due to this, CLOD is a significant threat to coral reef ecosystems and their structural integrity as this bacterial pathogen targets coralline algae.

==== Harmful algal blooms ====
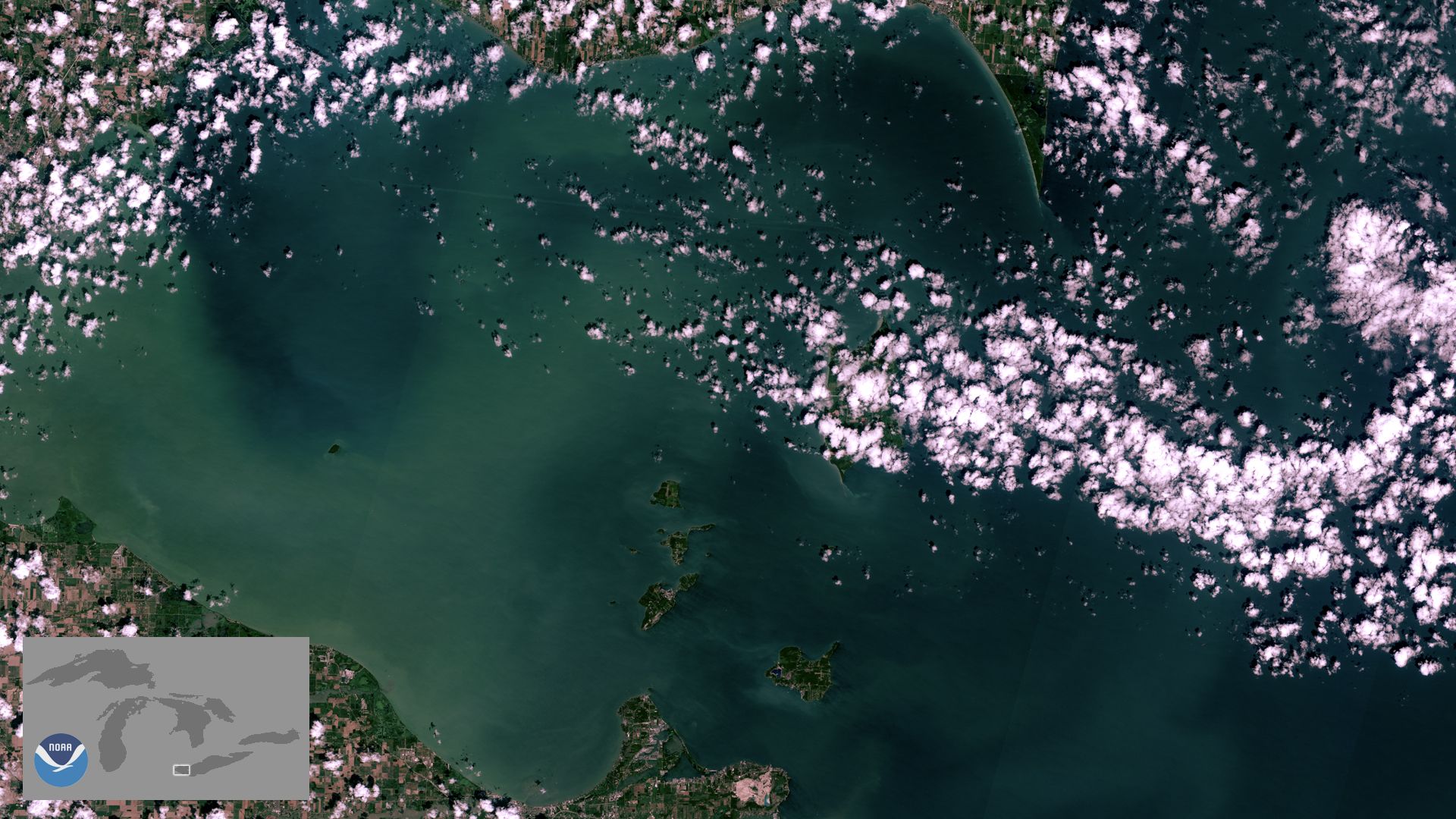
A large, and potentially toxic Harmful Algal Bloom (HAB), spanning over 620 square miles of Lake Erie, has been intensifying due to warm weather, nutrient runoff, and invasive mussles, prompting health warnings and increased water treatment efforts.

In 2006, the Littler's examined how herbivorous fishes in coral reef systems play an ecological role, emphasizing their function in macroalgal proliferation and the maintenance of coral dominance. They noted that overfishing or habitat degradation can lead to reduced herbivory, which in turn contributes to the proliferation of microorganisms that promote coral diseases. These external factors contribute to biotic-reef pathology by facilitating microbial dysbiosis, increasing coral susceptibility to pathogens, and reinforcing negative feedback loops that slow down reef recovery.

=== Inventory and survey programs ===
Diane's team has biodiversity inventories over the years of their research. One of the earliest inventories at a sanctuary based in Looe Key National Marine, Key West, Florida, allowed for significant legal retributions for any damages to seaweed-dominated reef habitats. She and her team also contributed to the development of standardized large-scale monitoring methods used by federal and state agencies such as the Bureau of Land Management, the Office of Water Resources Research, the National Oceanic and Atmospheric Administration (NOAA), the National Science Foundation (NSF), the State of Hawaii, the National Park Service, and the National Oceanographic and Minerals Management Service.

=== Conservation efforts ===
==== Saba Bank Atoll ====
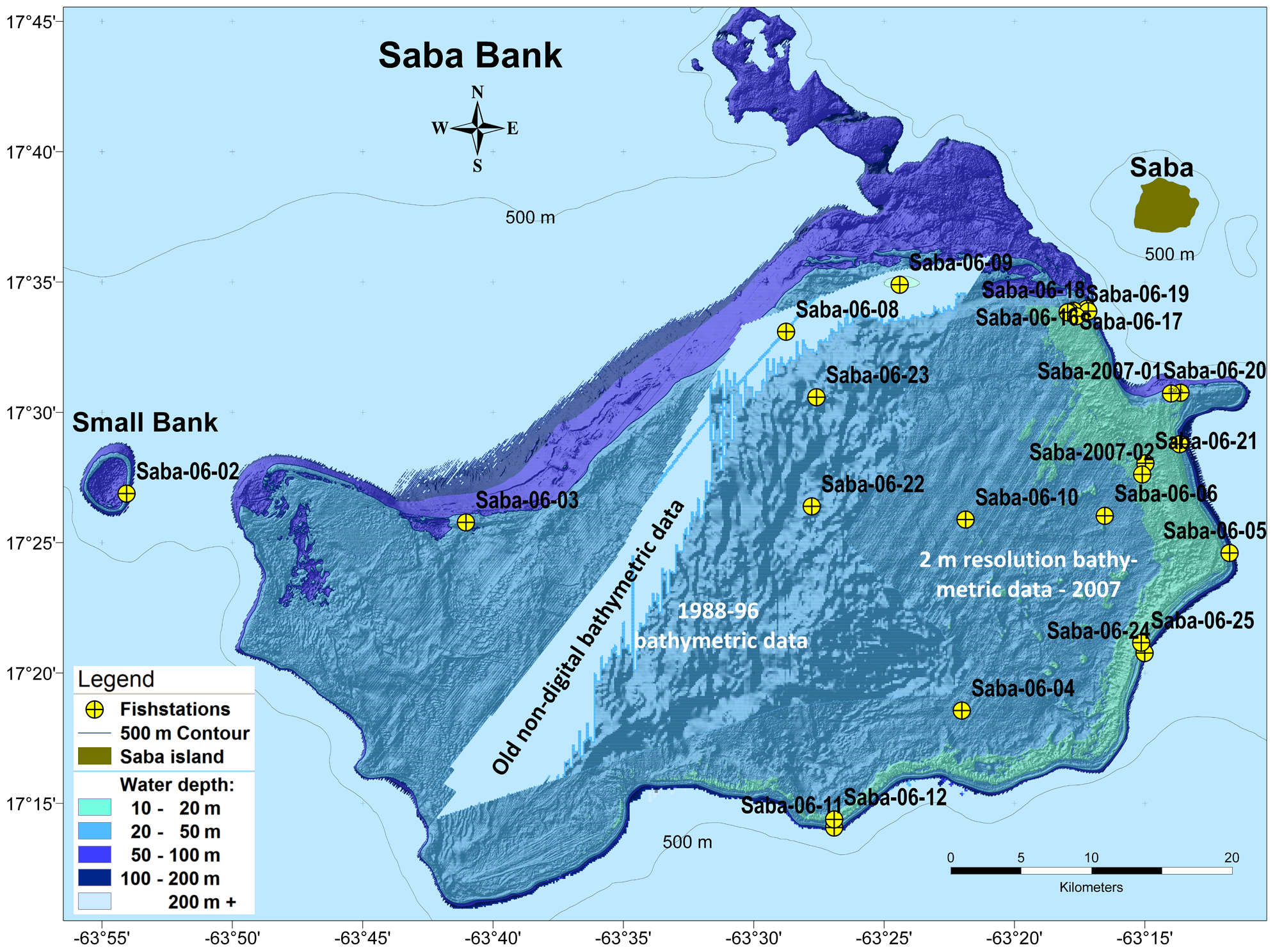
Topographic seafloor map of the Saba Bank featuring marked fishing sites

The Saba Bank Atoll, located in the Atlantic Ocean, is considered the largest underwater atoll. This atoll is located in the Caribbean Netherlands, and northeast of the island of Saba. The Saba Bank Atoll was noted for its biodiversity for macroalgae found in the Caribbean by Mark M. Littler during a two-week research dive. Diane led a three-person diving team, herself included. During the two-week expedition, they collected over 300 macrophyte specimens, among which 12 are believed to be previously undocumented species. The team also identified three novel macroalgal communities. The discovery of previously undocumented species of fish and seaweed, led to the recognition of the Saba Bank Atoll as a biodiversity 'hot spot'. In addition to this, two novel species of goby fish were observed and discovered as the Saba Bank Atoll was not extensively researched prior. Due to the discovery of novel specimens, the atoll was seen to be a 'hot spot'. The researchers and divers from Conservation International, the Netherlands Antilles government, and the Smithsonian Institution's Museum of Natural History, as well as local fishermen have advocated for more protection of the Saba Atoll as it is endanger due to large maritime vessels that avoid fees by waiting at the atoll which then causes damages to the reef.

==== Molasses Reef ====
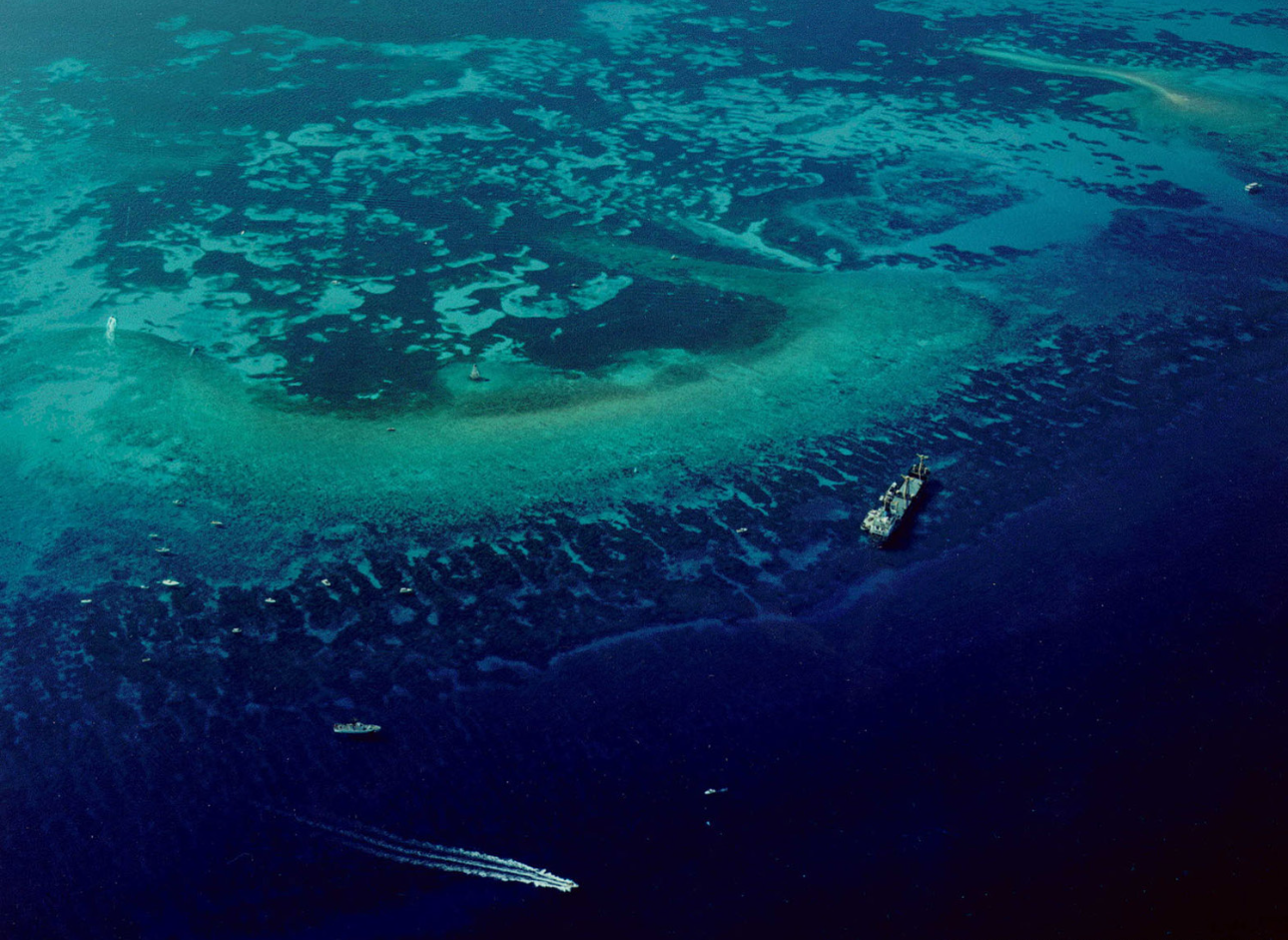
Overhead view of Molasses Reef in the Key Largo Marine Sanctuary in August 1984, with the MV Wellwood grounded near the center right.

The Littler's and their research team played an important role in assessing reef damage caused by the grounding of freighter Wellwood (August 4, 1984). Molasses Reef in Key Largo, Florida, as requested by the National Marine Sanctuaries Program under the NOAA. Their rapid-response study was able to aid in obtaining over $22 million in restitution, more than $3,000 per square meter of impacted reef. Restoration to Molasses Reef began in May 2002 and ended in August of 2007.

== Taxonomic contributions ==
(List may be incomplete. Referenced Wikispecies)

=== A ===
- Anadyomene gigantodictyon
- Anadyomene howei
- Anadyomene lacerata
- Anadyomene linkiana
- Avrainvillea digitata
- Avrainvillea fenicalii
- Avrainvillea fulva
- Avrainvillea hayi
- Avrainvillea rotumensis
- Avrainvillea silvana
- Avrainvillea sylvearleae

=== H ===
- Halimeda floridiana
- Halimeda pumila
- Halimeda pygmaea

=== P ===
- Protohalimedaceae

=== R ===
- Rhipidosiphon floridensis

=== T ===
- Taonia abbottiana

=== U ===
- Udotea abbottiorum
- Udotea caribaea
- Udotea dixonii
- Udotea dotyi
- Udotea fibrosa
- Udotea goreaui
- Udotea looensis
- Udotea luna
- Udotea norrisii
- Udotea unistratea

== Awards and recognition ==
- Guinness World Record for Deepest Plant found in 1984
- Gerald W. Prescott Prize in 2002
- Scientific Diving Lifetime Achievement Award in 2003
- Women's Diver Hall of Fame in 2010

== Publications ==
(List maybe incomplete. Retrieved from ScholarGPS)

- Littler, Mark M., Littler, Diane S. "The Evolution of Thallus Form and Survival Strategies in Benthic Marine Macroalgae: Field and Laboratory Tests of a Functional Form Model" The American Naturalist 116.1(1980)
- Littler, MM, Martz, DR, Littler, DS "Effects of recurrent sand deposition on rocky intertidal organisms: importance of substrate heterogeneity in a fluctuating environment" Marine Ecology Progress Series 11 (1983)
- Littler, Mark M., Littler, Diane S., Taylor, Phillip R. "EVOLUTIONARY STRATEGIES IN A TROPICAL BARRIER REEF SYSTEM: FUNCTIONAL-FORM GROUPS OF MARINE MACROALGAE1" Journal of Phycology 19.2(1983)
- Littler, Mark M., Taylor, Phillip R., Littler, Diane S. "Algal resistance to herbivory on a Caribbean barrier reef" Coral Reefs 2.2(1983)
- Littler, Mark M., Littler, Diane S. "HETEROMORPHIC LIFE-HISTORY STRATEGIES IN THE BROWN ALGA SCYTOSIPHON LOMENTARIA (LYNGB.) LINK1" Journal of Phycology 19.4(1983)
- Littler, Mark M., Littler, Diane S. "Relationships between macroalgal functional form groups and substrata stability in a subtropical rocky-intertidal system" Journal of Experimental Marine Biology and Ecology 74.1(1984)
- Littler, Mark M., Taylor, Phillip R., Littler, Diane S., Sims, R. H., Norris, James N. "The distribution, abundance and primary productivity of submerged macrophytes in a Belize barrier-reef mangrove system" Atoll Research Bulletin 289 (1985)
- Littler, Mark M., Littler, Diane S., Blair, Stephen M., Norris, James N. "Deepest Known Plant Life Discovered on an Uncharted Seamount" Science 227.4682(1985)
- Jensen, Paul R., Gibson, Robert A., Littler, Mark M., Littler, Diane S. "Photosynthesis and calcification in four deep-water Halimeda species (chlorophyceae, caulerpales)" Deep Sea Research Part A. Oceanographic Research Papers 32.4(1985)
- Taylor, Phillip R., Littler, Mark M., Littler, Diane S. "Escapes from herbivory in relation to the structure of mangrove island macroalgal communities" Oecologia 69.4(1986)
- Littler, Mark M., Littler, Diane S., Blair, Stephen M., Norris, James N. "Deep-water plant communities from an uncharted seamount off San Salvador Island, Bahamas: distribution, abundance, and primary productivity" Deep Sea Research Part A. Oceanographic Research Papers 33.7(1986)
- Littler, Mark M., Taylor, Phillip R., Littler, Diane S. "Plant defense associations in the marine environment" Coral Reefs 5.2(1986)
- Littler, Mark M., Taylor, Phillip R., Littler, Diane S., Sims, R. H., Norris, James N. "Dominant macrophyte standing stocks, productivity and community structure on a Belizean barrier-reef" Atoll Research Bulletin 302 (1987)
- Littler, Mark M., Littler, Diane S., Taylor, Phillip R. "Animal-plant defense associations: Effects on the distribution and abundance of tropical reef macrophytes" Journal of Experimental Marine Biology and Ecology 105.2-3(1987)
- Paul, Valerie J., Littler, Mark M., Littler, Diane S., Fenical, William "Evidence for chemical defense in tropical green algaCaulerpa ashmeadii (Caulerpaceae: Chlorophyta): Isolation of new bioactive sesquiterpenoids" Journal of Chemical Ecology 13.5(1987)
- Macintyre, Ian G., Graus, Richard R., Reinthal, Peter N., Littler, Mark M., Littler, Diane S. "The Barrier Reef sediment apron: Tobacco Reef, Belize" Coral Reefs 6.1(1987)
- Lapointe, Brian E., Littler, Mark M., Littler, Diane S. "A comparison of nutrient-limited productivity in macroalgae from a Caribbean barrier reef and from a mangrove ecosystem" Aquatic Botany 28.3-4(1987)
- Hanisak, M. D., Littler, M. M., Littler, D. S. "Significance of macroalgal polymorphism: intraspecific tests of the functional-form model" Marine Biology 99.2(1988)
- Littler, M. M., Taylor, P. R., Littler, D. S. "Complex interactions in the control of coral zonation on a Caribbean reef flat" Oecologia 80.3(1989)
- Kilar, John A., Littler, Mark M., Littler, Diane S. "FUNCTIONAL-MORPHOLOGICAL RELATIONSHIPS IN SARGASSUM POLYCERATIUM (PHAEOPHYTA): PHENOTYPIC AND ONTOGENETIC VARIABILITY IN APPARENT PHOTOSYNTHESIS AND DARK RESPIRATION1" Journal of Phycology 25.4(1989)
- Littler, Mark M., Littler, Diane S. "Productivity and nutrient relationships in psammophytic versus epilithic forms of Bryopsidales (Chlorophyta): comparisons based on a short-term physiological assay" In Thirteenth International Seaweed Symposium, Springer Netherlands (1990)
- Hanisak, M. Dennis, Littler, Mark M., Littler, Diane S. "Application of the functional-form model to the culture of seaweeds" In Thirteenth International Seaweed Symposium, Springer Netherlands (1990)
- Littler, D.S., Littler, M.M. "Reestablishment of the green algal genus Rhipidosiphon Montagne (Udoteaceae, Bryopsidales) with a description of Rhipidosiphon floridensis sp. nov." British Phycological Journal 25.1(1990)
- Littler, D. S., Littler, M. M. "Systematics of Udotea species (Bryopsidales, Chlorophyta) in the tropical western Atlantic" Phycologia 29.2(1990)
- Hanisak, M. Dennis, Littler, Mark M., Littler, Diane S. "Application of the functional-form model to the culture of seaweeds" Hydrobiologia 204-205.1(1990)
- Littler, Mark M., Littler, Diane S. "Productivity and nutrient relationships in psammophytic versus epilithic forms of Bryopsidales (Chlorophyta): comparisons based on a short-term physiological assay" Hydrobiologia 204-205.1(1990)
- Littler, Diane S., Littler, Mark M. "SYSTEMATICS OF ANADYOMENE SPECIES (ANADYOMENACEAE, CHLOROPHYTA) IN THE TROPICAL WESTERN ATLANTIC1" Journal of Phycology 27.1(1991)
- Littler, Mark M., Littler, Diane S., Dennis Hanisak, M. "Deep-water rhodolith distribution, productivity, and growth history at sites of formation and subsequent degradation" Journal of Experimental Marine Biology and Ecology 150.2(1991)
- Littler, M. M., Littler, D. S., Titlyanov, E. A. "Comparisons of N- and P-limited productivity between high granitic islands versus low carbonate atolls in the Seychelles Archipelago: a test of the relative-dominance paradigm" Coral Reefs 10.4(1991)
- Littler, Mark M., Littler, Diane S. "Photosynthesis vs. irradiance curves for six species of macroalgae from the Seychelles Islands under four levels of nutrient enrichment" Atoll Research Bulletin 374 (1992)
- Lapointe, Brian E., Littler, Mark M., Littler, Diane S. "Nutrient Availability to Marine Macroalgae in Siliciclastic versus Carbonate-Rich Coastal Waters" Estuaries 15.1(1992)
- Littler, D. S., Littler, M. M. "Systematics of Avrainvillea (Bryopsidales, Chlorophyta) in the tropical western Atlantic" Phycologia 31.5(1992)
- Littler, M. M., Littler, D. S. "A pathogen of reef-building coralline algae discovered in the South Pacific" Coral Reefs 13.4(1994)
- Littler, Mark M., Littler, Diane S. "Algenwachstum in ozeanischen Tiefen" Biologie in unserer Zeit 24.6(1994)
- Littler, Mark M., Littler, Diane S., Macintyre, Ian G., Brooks, Barrett L., Taylor, Phillip R., Lapointe, Brian E. "The Tobacco Range Fracture Zone, Belize, C.A.: a unique system of slumped mangrove peat" Atoll Research Bulletin 428 (1995)
- Littler, Diane S., Littler, Mark M., Brooks, Barrett L. "Marine algae and seagrasses from the Tobacco Range Fracture Zone, Belize, C.A" Atoll Research Bulletin 429 (1995)
- Macintyre, Ian G., Littler, Mark M., Littler, Diane S. "Holocene history of Tobacco Range, Belize, Central America" Atoll Research Bulletin 430 (1995)
- Littler, Mark M., Littler, Diane S. "Impact of CLOD Pathogen on Pacific Coral Reefs" Science 267.5202(1995)
- Littler, Mark M., Littler, Diane S., Taylor, Phillip R. "Selective Herbivore Increases Biomass of Its Prey: A Chiton-Coralline Reef-Building Association" Ecology 76.5(1995)
- Littler, M. M., Littler, D. S. "A colonial tunicate smothers corals and coralline algae on the Great Astrolabe Reef, Fiji" Coral Reefs 14.3(1995)
- Littler, Mark M., Littler, Diane S. "Response : CLOD Spreading in the Sea-Surface Microlayer" Science 270.5238(1995)
- N'Yeurt, Antoine D. R., Littler, Diane S., Littler, Mark M. "Avrainvillea rotumensis sp. nov. (Bryopsidales, Chlorophyta), a peltate species from the South Pacific" Phycological Research 44.2(1996)
- Gacia, E., Littler, M.M., Littler, D.S. "The relationships between morphology and photosynthetic parameters within the polymorphic genus Caulerpa" Journal of Experimental Marine Biology and Ecology 204.1-2(1996)
- Mateo, M.A., Romero, J., Pérez, M., Littler, M.M., Littler, D.S. "Dynamics of Millenary Organic Deposits Resulting from the Growth of the Mediterranean SeagrassPosidonia oceanica" Estuarine, Coastal and Shelf Science 44.1(1997)
- Littler, M. M., Littler, D. S., Brooks, B. L., Koven, J. F. "A unique coral reef formation discovered on the Great Astrolabe Reef, Fiji" Coral Reefs 16.1(1997)
- Littler, M.M., Littler, D.S. "An undescribed fungal pathogen of reef-forming crustose corraline algae discovered in American Samoa" Coral Reefs 17.2(1998)
- Gacia, E, Littler, M.M, Littler, D.S "An Experimental Test of the Capacity of Food Web Interactions (Fish–Epiphytes–Seagrasses) to Offset the Negative Consequences of Eutrophication on Seagrass Communities" Estuarine, Coastal and Shelf Science 48.6(1999)
- Littler, Mark M., Littler, Diane S. "BLADE ABANDONMENT/PROLIFERATION: A NOVEL MECHANISM FOR RAPID EPIPHYTE CONTROL IN MARINE MACROPHYTES" Ecology 80.5(1999)
- Littler, M.M., Littler, D.S. "Castles built by a chiton from the Great Astrolabe Reef, Fiji" Coral Reefs 18.2(1999)
- Littler, M.M., Littler, D.S. "Disturbances due to Cyclone Gavin parallel those caused by a ship grounding" Coral Reefs 18.2(1999)
- Littler, M.M., Littler, D.S. "Epithallus sloughing: a self-cleaning mechanism for coralline algae" Coral Reefs 18.3(1999)
- Macintyre, Ian G., Goodbody, I., Rützler, Klaus, Littler, Diane S., Littler, Mark M. "A general biological and geological survey of the rims of ponds in the major mangrove islands of the Pelican Cays, Belize" Atoll Research Bulletin 467 (2000)
- Littler, Diane S., Littler, Mark M., Brooks, Barrett L. "Checklist of marine algae and seagrasses from the ponds of the Pelican Cays, Belize" Atoll Research Bulletin 474 (2000)
- Littler, M. M., Littler, D. S. "Living stromatolites, built by the cyanobacterium Schizothrix gebeleinii, form enduring modern reef structures" Coral Reefs 19.3(2001)
- Littler, Mark M., Littler, Diane S. "Marine botanical studies" Atoll Research Bulletin 494.7(2001)
- Littler, Mark M, Littler, Diane Scullion "Waterways & Byways Of The Indian River Lagoon: Field Guide For Boaters, Anglers & Naturalists" OffShore Graphics, Inc. (2003)
- Littler, Diane Scullion, Littler, Mark M "South Pacific Reef Plants: A Divers' Guide To The Plant Life Of South Pacific Coral Reefs" Offshore Graphics, Inc. (2003)
- Littler, Mark M., Littler, Diane S., Brooks, Barrett L. "Extraordinary mound building forms of Avrainvillea (Bryopsidales, Chlorophyta): their experimental taxonomy, comparative functional morphology and ecological strategies" Atoll Research Bulletin 515 (2004)
- Lapointe, Brian E., Barile, Peter J., Yentsch, Charles S., Littler, Mark M., Littler, Diane S., Kakuk, Brian "The relative importance of nutrient enrichment and herbivory on macroalgal communities near Norman's Pond Cay, Exumas Cays, Bahamas: a "natural" enrichment experiment" Journal of Experimental Marine Biology and Ecology 298.2(2004)
- Littler, Diane S., Littler, Mark M., Macintyre, Ian G., Bowlin, Emily, Andres, Miriam S., Reid, R. Pamela "Guide to the dominant macroalgae of the stromatolite fringing reef complex, Highborne Cay, Bahamas" Atoll Research Bulletin 532 (2005)
- Lapointe, Brian E., Barile, Peter J., Littler, Mark M., Littler, Diane S. "Macroalgal blooms on southeast Florida coral reefs" Harmful Algae 4.6(2005)
- Lapointe, Brian E., Barile, Peter J., Littler, Mark M., Littler, Diane S., Bedford, Bradley J., Gasque, Constance "Macroalgal blooms on southeast Florida coral reefs" Harmful Algae 4.6(2005)
- Littler, M. M., Littler, D. S., Brooks, B. L. "Extraordinary mound building Avrainvillea (Chlorophyta): the largest tropical marine plants" Coral Reefs 24.4(2005)
- Littler, M. M., Littler, D. S., Lapointe, B. E., Barile, P. J. "Toxic Cyanobacteria (blue-green algae) associated with groundwater conduits in the Bahamas" Coral Reefs 25.2(2006)
- Littler, M.M., Littler, D.S., Brooks, B.L., Lapointe, B.E. "Nutrient manipulation methods for coral reef studies: A critical review and experimental field data" Journal of Experimental Marine Biology and Ecology 336.2(2006)
- Littler, Mark M., Littler, Diane S., Brooks, Barrett L. "Harmful algae on tropical coral reefs: Bottom-up eutrophication and top-down herbivory" Harmful Algae 5.5(2006)
- Littler, Mark M., Littler, Diane S. "Assessment of coral reefs using herbivory/nutrient assays and indicator groups of benthic primary producers: a critical synthesis, proposed protocols, and critique of management strategies" Aquatic Conservation: Marine and Freshwater Ecosystems 17.2(2007)
- Verbruggen, Heroen, Leliaert, Frederik, Maggs, Christine A., Shimada, Satoshi, Schils, Tom, Provan, Jim, Booth, David, Murphy, Sue, De Clerck, Olivier, Littler, Diane S., Littler, Mark M., Coppejans, Eric "Species boundaries and phylogenetic relationships within the green algal genus Codium (Bryopsidales) based on plastid DNA sequences" Molecular Phylogenetics and Evolution 44.1(2007)
- Lapointe, B. E., Bedford, B. J., Littler, M. M., Littler, D. S. "Shifts in coral overgrowth by sponges and algae" Coral Reefs 26.3(2007)
- Littler, M. M., Littler, D. S., Brooks, B. L., Lapointe, B. E. "Unusual linear arrays of the coral reef macrophyte Halimeda incrassata in the Bahamas" Coral Reefs 26.4(2007)
- Littler, M. M., Littler, D. S. "Coralline algal rhodoliths form extensive benthic communities in the Gulf of Chiriqui, Pacific Panama" Coral Reefs 27.3(2008)
- Littler, Mark M., Littler, Diane S., Brooks, Barrett L. "Herbivory, Nutrients, Stochastic Events, and Relative Dominances of Benthic Indicator Groups on Coral Reefs: A Review and Recommendations" In Proceedings of the Smithsonian Marine Science Symposium, Smithsonian Institution Scholarly Press (2009)
- Verbruggen, Heroen, Ashworth, Matt, LoDuca, Steven T., Vlaeminck, Caroline, Cocquyt, Ellen, Sauvage, Thomas, Zechman, Frederick W., Littler, Diane S., Littler, Mark M., Leliaert, Frederik "A multi-locus time-calibrated phylogeny of the siphonous green algae" Molecular Phylogenetics and Evolution 50.3(2009)
- Demes, Kyle W., Littler, Mark M., Littler, Diane S. "Comparative phosphate acquisition in giant-celled rhizophytic algae (Bryopsidales, Chlorophyta): Fleshy vs. calcified forms" Aquatic Botany 92.2(2010)
- Littler, Mark M., Littler, Diane S., Brooks, Barrett L. "The effects of nitrogen and phosphorus enrichment on algal community development: Artificial mini-reefs on the Belize Barrier Reef sedimentary lagoon" Harmful Algae 9.3(2010)
- Littler, Mark M., Littler, Diane S., Brooks, Barrett L. "Marine Macroalgal Diversity Assessment of Saba Bank, Netherlands Antilles" PLoS ONE 5.5(2010)
- Littler, Mark M., Littler, Diane S. "ALGAE OF AUSTRALIA: MARINE BENTHIC ALGAE OF LORD HOWE ISLAND AND THE SOUTHERN GREAT BARRIER REEF, 2. BROWN ALGAE" Journal of Phycology 46.3(2010)
- Littler, Mark M., Littler, Diane S. "Algae, Blue-Green Boring" In Encyclopedia of Modern Coral Reefs, Springer Netherlands (2011)
- Littler, Mark M., Littler, Diane S. "Algae, Coralline" In Encyclopedia of Modern Coral Reefs, Springer Netherlands (2011)
- Littler, Mark M., Littler, Diane S. "Algae-Macro" In Encyclopedia of Modern Coral Reefs, Springer Netherlands (2011)
- Littler, Mark M., Littler, Diane S. "Algae, Turf" In Encyclopedia of Modern Coral Reefs, Springer Netherlands (2011)
- Littler, Mark M., Littler, Diane S. "BLOOM OF THE GIANT ANADYOMENE GIGANTODICTYON SP. NOV. (ANADYOMENACEAE, CLADOPHORALES) FROM THE OUTER SLOPE (25–50 m) OF THE BELIZE BARRIER REEF1" Journal of Phycology 48.1(2012)
- Littler, Mark M., Littler, Diane S. "The Nature of Macroalgae and Their Interactions on Reefs" In Research and Discoveries: The Revolution of Science through Scuba, Smithsonian Institution Scholarly Press (2013)
- Littler, Mark M., Littler, Diane S. "The Nature of Crustose Coralline Algae and Their Interactions on Reefs" In Research and Discoveries: The Revolution of Science through Scuba, Smithsonian Institution Scholarly Press (2013)
- Littler, Mark M., Littler, Diane S. "The Nature of Turf and Boring Algae and Their Interactions on Reefs" In Research and Discoveries: The Revolution of Science through Scuba, Smithsonian Institution Scholarly Press (2013)
