= Belize Barrier Reef =

Series of coral reefs straddling the coast of Belize

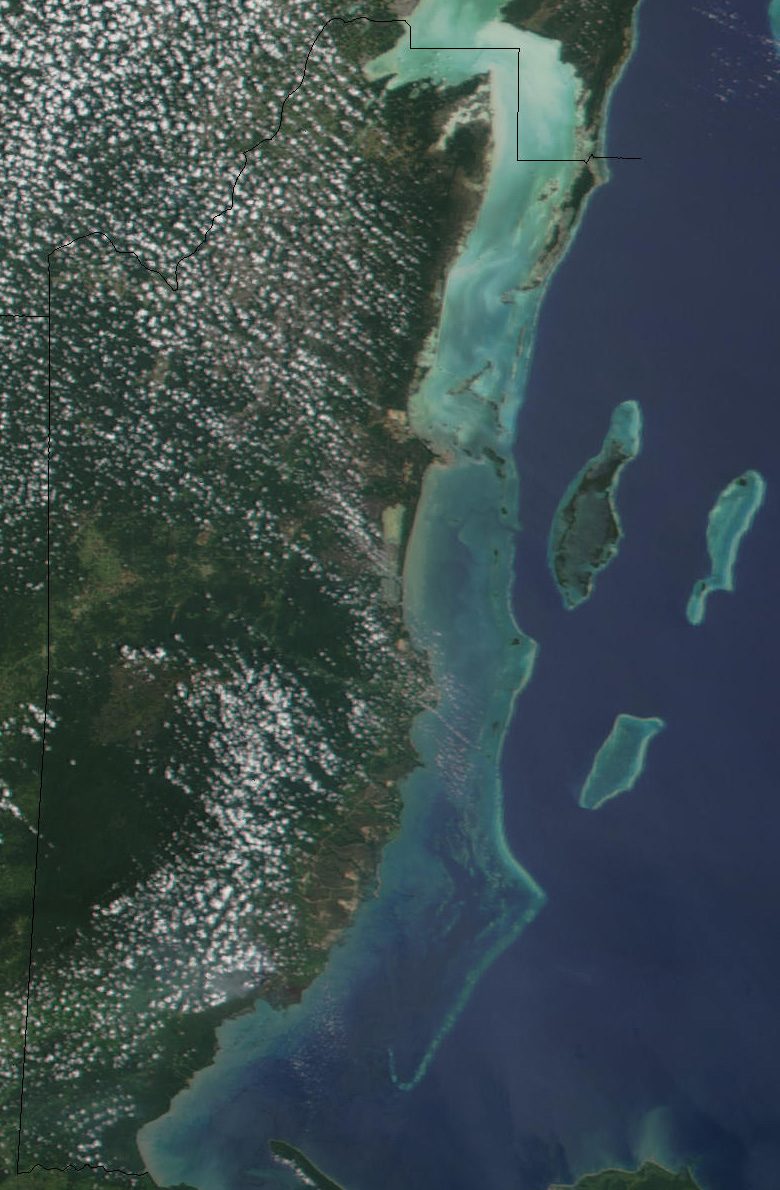
- The Barrier Reef is clearly visible along the eastern coast of Belize in the Caribbean Sea.

- Location within Belize Location within the Caribbean
- Location: Belize
- Nearest city: Belize City, Belize
- Coordinates: 17°18′56″N 87°32′4″W

UNESCO World Heritage Site
- Official name: Belize Barrier Reef Reserve System
- Type: Natural
- Criteria: vii, ix, x
- Designated: 1996 (20th session)
- Reference no.: 764
- Region: Latin America and the Caribbean
- Endangered: 2009–2018

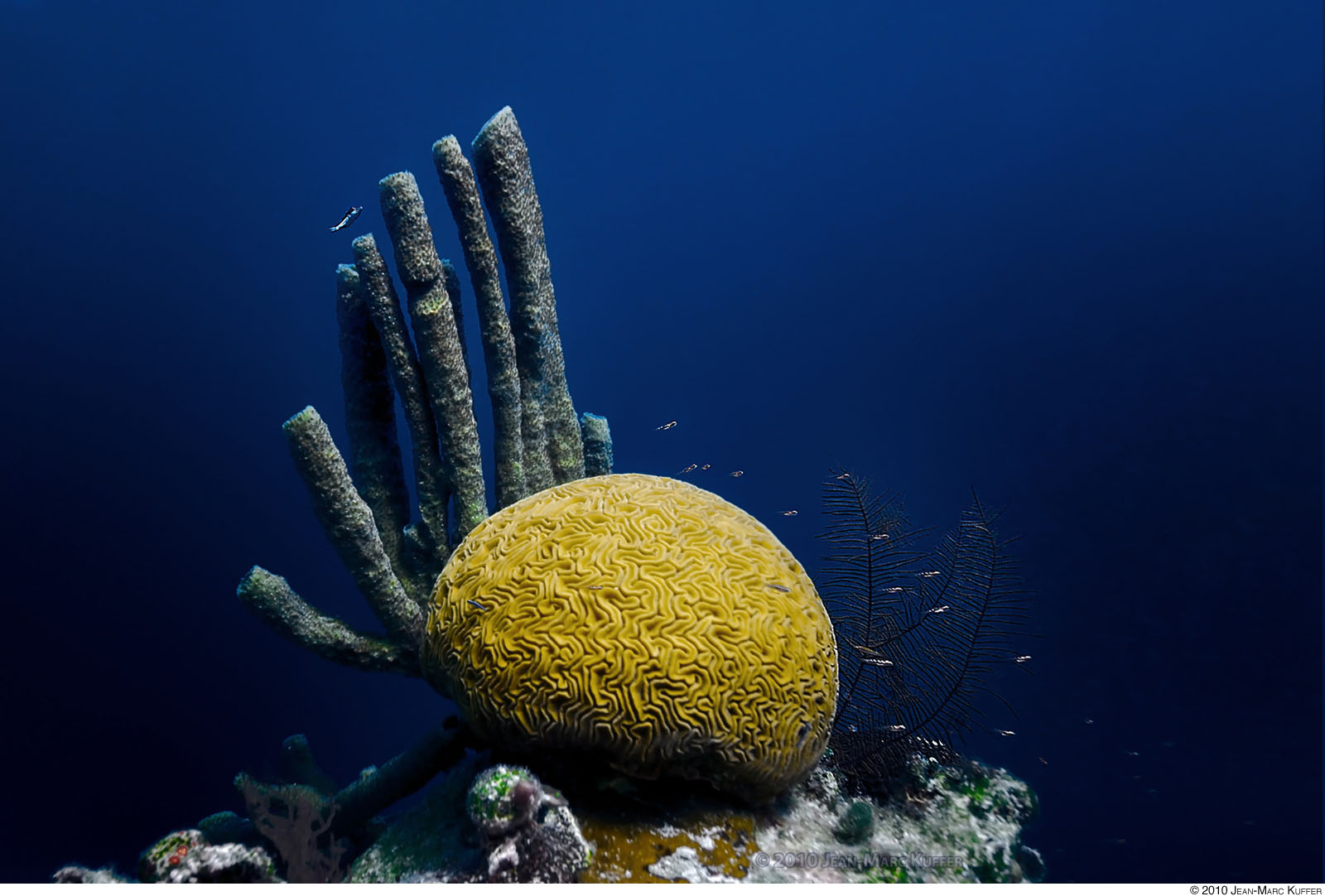
Brain coral in the Great Blue Hole

The Belize Barrier Reef is a series of coral reefs straddling the coast of Belize, roughly 300 metres (980 ft) offshore in the north and 40 kilometres (25 mi) in the south within the country limits. The Belize Barrier Reef is a 300-kilometre (190 mi) long section of the 900-kilometre (560 mi) Mesoamerican Barrier Reef System, which is continuous from Cancún on the north-eastern tip of the Yucatán Peninsula through the Riviera Maya and down to Honduras, making it the second largest coral reef system in the world after the Great Barrier Reef in Australia. It is Belize's top tourist destination, popular for scuba diving and snorkeling and attracting almost half of its 260,000 visitors. It is also vital to the country's fishing industry.

Charles Darwin described it as "the most remarkable reef in the West Indies" in 1842.

In addition to its barrier reef, it also boasts three distinct Caribbean atolls: Turneffe Atoll, Glover's Reef and Lighthouse Reef. Lighthouse Reef is the most easterly diving area in Belize, it is home to the Great Blue Hole, made famous by Jacques Cousteau in 1970; Turneffe Atoll lies directly to the east of Belize City and is the nearest of the atolls to that city. These different reefs provide diverse scuba diving opportunities that include walls, pinnacles and reef flats that are located throughout an enormous area of sea.

== Species ==
The Belize Barrier Reef is home to a large diversity of plants and animals:

- 70 hard coral species
- 36 soft coral species
- 500 species of fish
- hundreds of invertebrate species

With 90% of the reef still needing to be researched, it is estimated that only 10% of all species have been discovered.

== Environmental protection ==
A large portion of the reef is protected by the Belize Barrier Reef Reserve System, which includes seven marine reserves, 450 cayes, and three atolls. It totals 960 square kilometres (370 mi^{2}) in area, including:

- Glover's Reef Marine Reserve
- Great Blue Hole
- South Water Caye Marine Reserve
- Half Moon Caye Natural Monument
- Hol Chan Marine Reserve
- Cayes include: Ambergris Caye, Caye Caulker, Caye Chapel, Carrie Bow Caye, St. George's Caye, English Caye, Rendezvous Caye, Gladden Caye, Ranguana Caye, Long Caye, Moho Caye, Blackbird Caye, Three Corner Caye, Northern Caye, Tobacco Caye, and Sandbore Caye.

In 1996 the reserve system was designated a World Heritage Site due to its vulnerability and the fact that it contains the most important and significant natural habitats for in-situ conservation of biological diversity (according to criteria VII, IX, and X).

Belize became the first country in the world to completely ban bottom trawling in December 2010. In December 2015, Belize banned offshore oil drilling within 1 km of the Barrier Reef.

Despite these protective measures, the reef remains under threat from oceanic pollution as well as uncontrolled tourism, shipping, and fishing. Other threats include hurricanes, along with global warming and the resulting increase in ocean temperatures, which causes coral bleaching. It is claimed by scientists that over 40% of Belize's coral reef has been damaged since 1998. In the lagoon habitat off Wee Wee Cay within the Belize Barrier Reef, in-situ temperature measurements collected between 2004 and 2014 showed a gradual warming trend, with recorded temperatures rising from approximately 22.3 °C to 32.4 °C, indicating increasing thermal stress for local coral communities.

The Belize Barrier Reef has been affected by mass-bleaching events. The first mass bleaching occurred in 1995, with an estimated mortality of 10 percent of coral colonies, according to a report by the Coastal Zone Management Institute in Belize. A second mass-bleaching event occurred, when Hurricane Mitch struck in 1998. Biologists observed a 48 percent reduction in live coral cover across the Belize reef system.

Usually, it is hard to distinguish whether the reason for coral bleaching is human activities or natural reasons such as storms or bacterial fluctuations. In the case of the Belize Barrier Reef, many factors which make the distinction difficult do not apply. Human population in this area is much more sparse than the corresponding areas near other coral reefs, so the human activity and pollution are much lower compared to other coral reefs and the Belize reef system is in a much more enclosed area.

When coral bleaching occurs, a large part of the coral dies, and the remaining part of the ecosystem begins the process of repairing the damage. But the chances of recovery are low, as corals that are bleached become much more vulnerable to disease. Disease often kills more corals than the bleaching event itself. With continuous bleaching, the coral reef will have little to no chance of recovery.

== Gallery ==
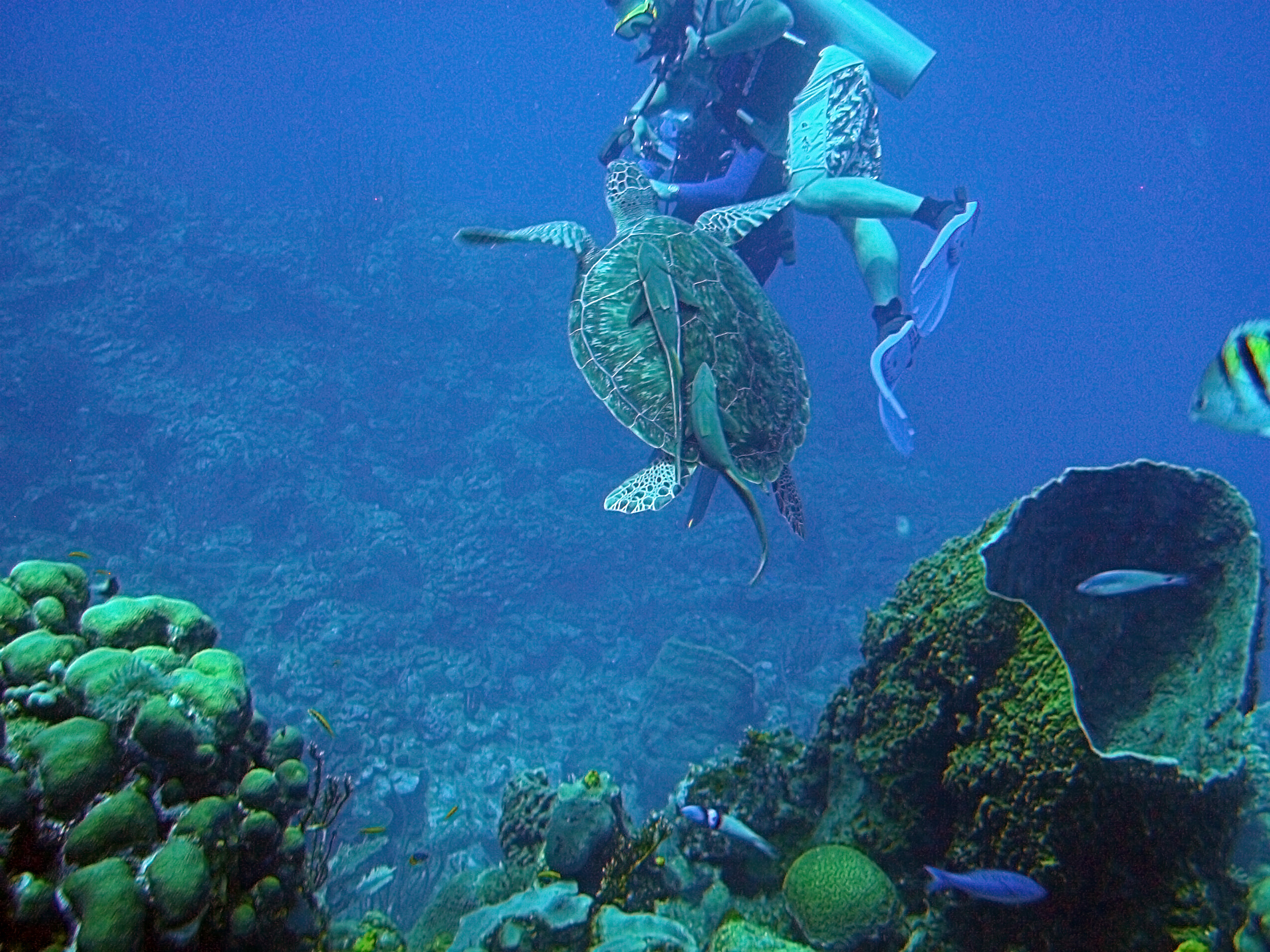
Green sea turtle with remora fish on its back

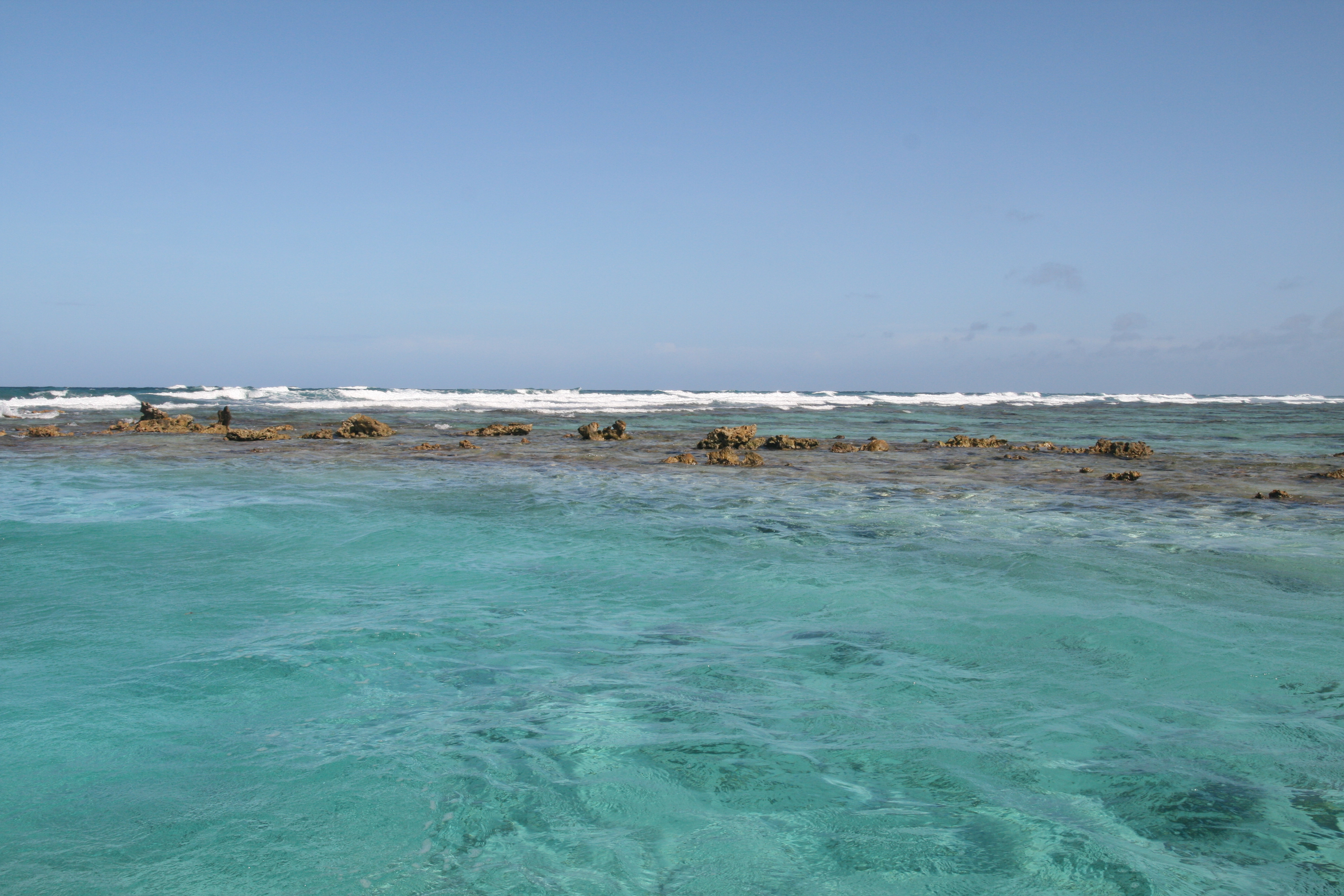
Close-up view of the reef

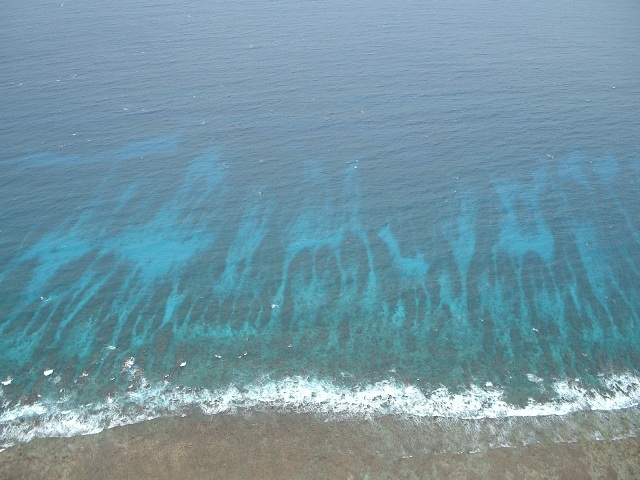
Barrier reef aerial

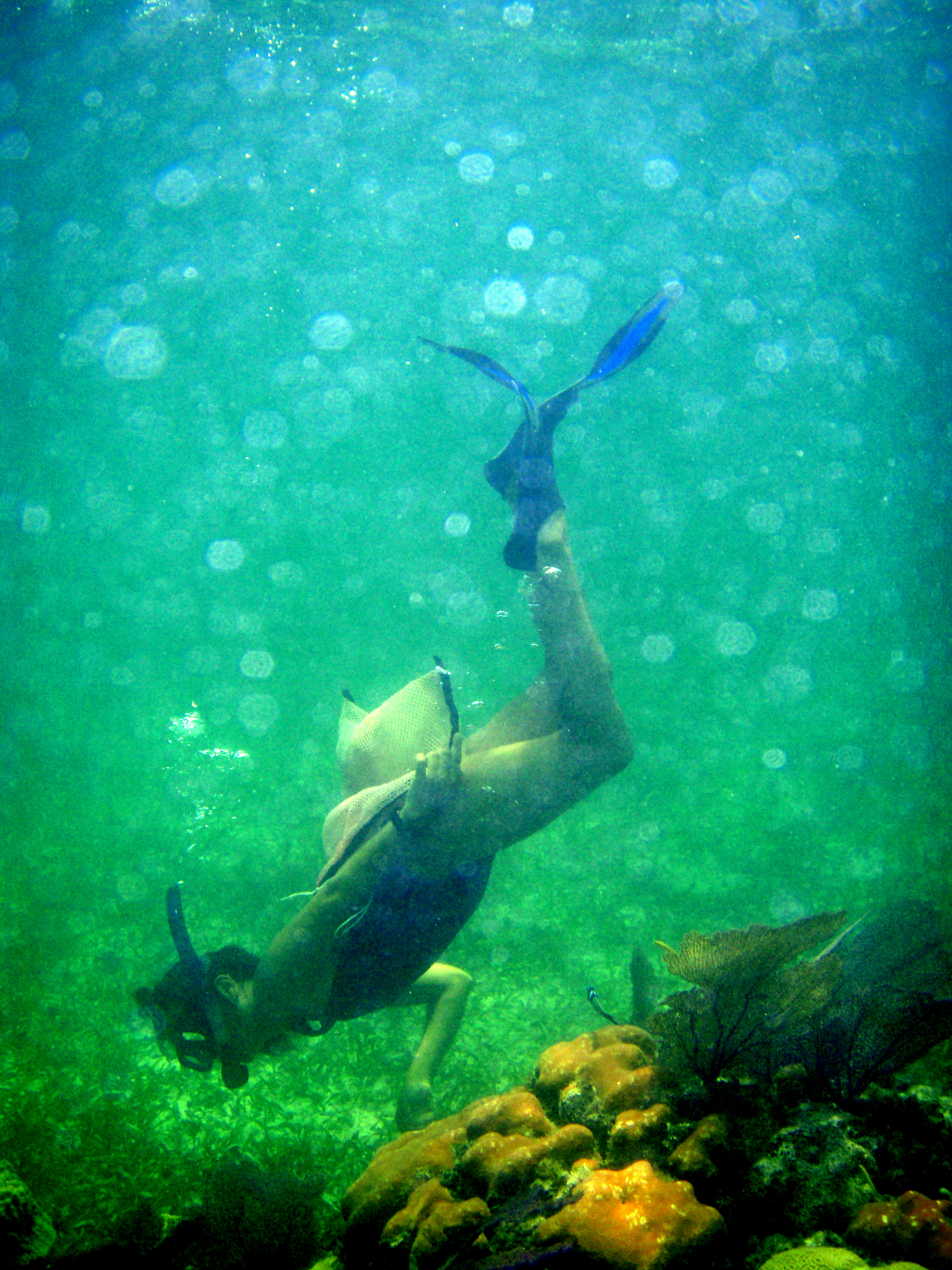
Snorkeling the reef

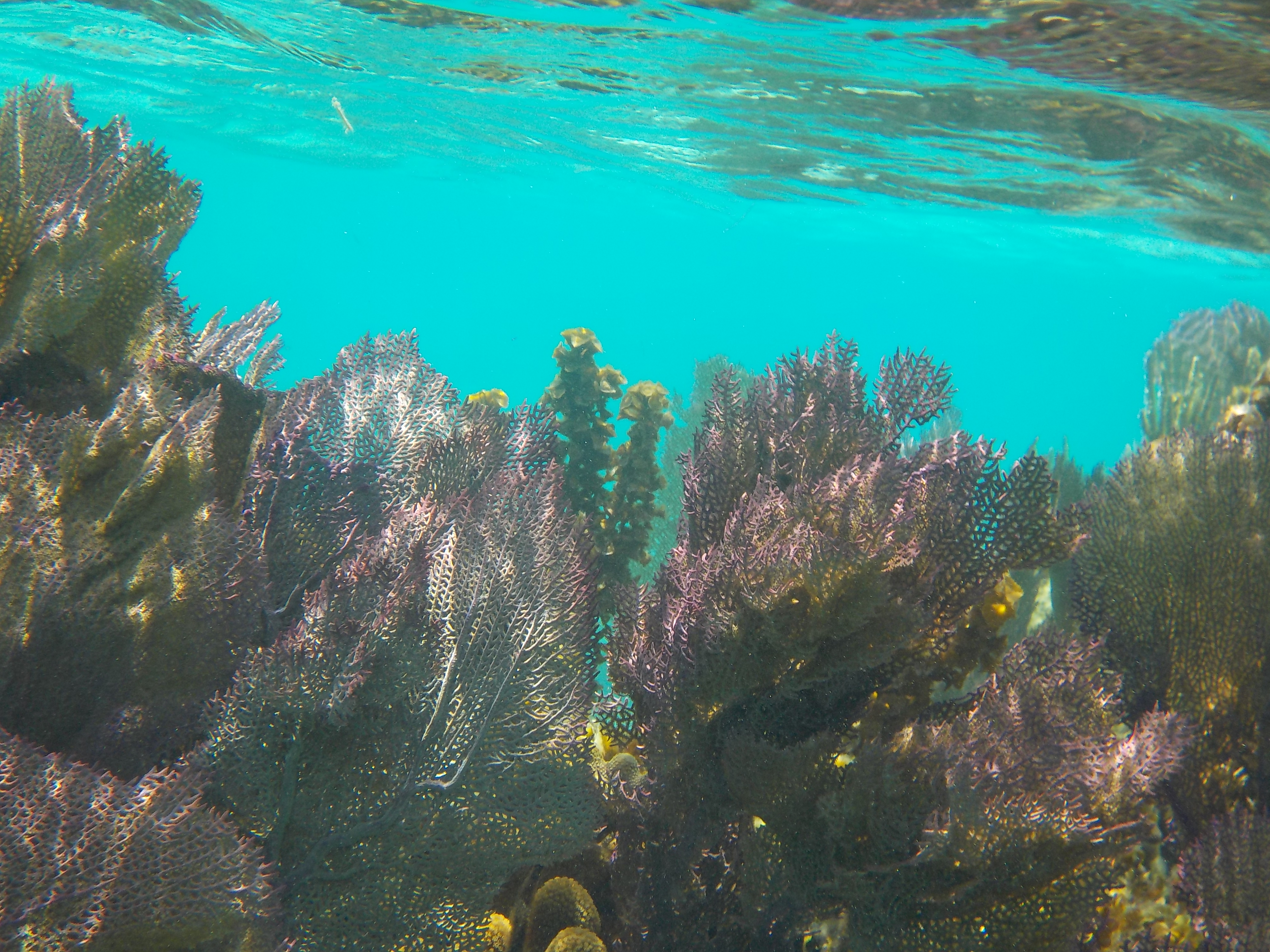
Fan corals of the reef

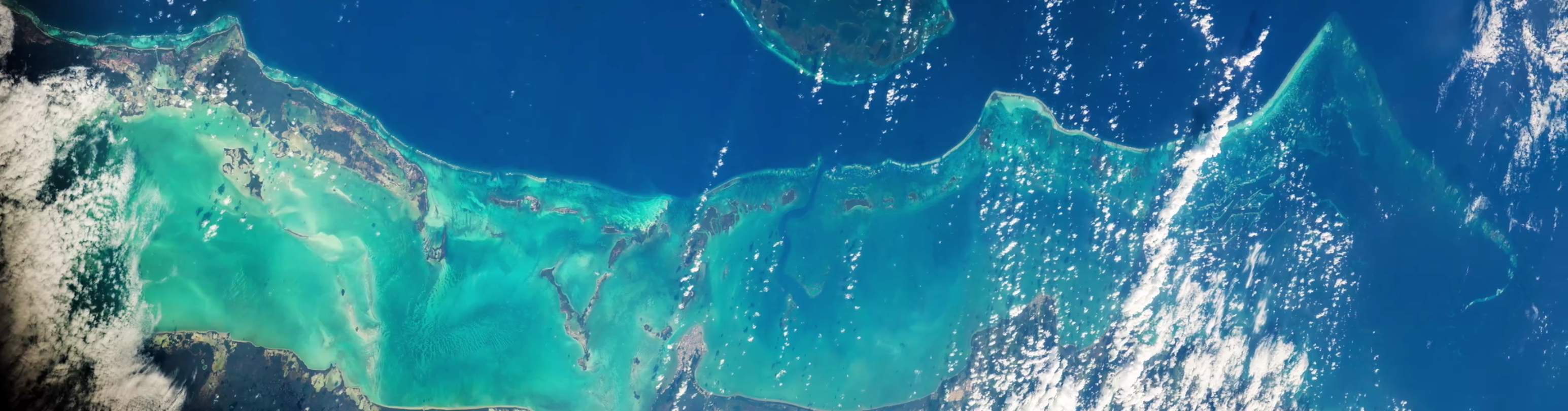
The Belize Barrier Reef photographed from the International Space Station in 2016

== See also ==
- List of reefs
- World Heritage Sites in Danger
