= Moho Caye =

Island of Belize

Coordinates: 16.500°N 88.167°W

Moho Caye, known locally as Wild Orchid Caye, is an 8.38 acre island located in the Caribbean Sea, off the coast of Belize. The island is located 12 miles east from Placencia, 9 miles from the Belize Barrier Reef, and has around 2,980 feet of beach.
