= The Actual Star =

2021 American speculative fiction novel

- First edition
- Author: Monica Byrne
- Cover artist: Damon Za
- Language: English
- Genre: Speculative Fiction
- Publisher: HarperVoyager
- Publication place: United States
- ISBN: 978-0-063-00289-0

The Actual Star is a 2021 speculative fiction novel by Monica Byrne. The story takes place across three timelines, with a narrative rooted in Mayan folklore and cosmology. Byrne researched the book for seven years before publishing it.

== Plot synopsis ==
The first timeline takes place over two days, December 9-10th, 1012, and centers on two sisters and a brother (Ket, Ixul and Ajul) who are the last scions of a declining Mayan kingdom. As Ixul and Ajul prepare for their ascension to the throne, they are unknowingly the target of an uprising set to end their dynasty.

The more present-day timeline takes place over 6 days, December 16-21st, 2012, and centers on Leah Oliveri, a young woman from Anoong, Minnesota, who journeys to Belize to explore her roots. She meets two Mayan guides, Xander Cañul and Javier Magaña, who are twins. They take her to the sacred cave, Actun Tunichil Muknal, deep in the jungle, where she discovers a connection to Xibalba, the Mayan underworld, and to the events of long ago.

The story set in the future spans most of a year, January 14 - December 20, 3012. Humanity has been greatly reduced due to a climatic apocalypse brought on by human abuse of the environment. The survivors establish a utopian, genderless, nomadic society with a religion, Laviaja, based on worship of Leah and the two brothers she encountered in her search in Belize. The narrative follows Niloux deCayo, who is determined to challenge some of the fundamental precepts of her society, at the risk of being labeled a heretic and excommunication. She is opposed by Tanaaj deCayo, who wishes to preserve a more conservative interpretation of Laviaja.

The sacred cave, Actun Tunichil Muknal, is the axis upon which all the timelines converge, and where each of the protagonists ultimately discovers the truths they sought.

== Characters ==
Past – Mayan (1012):

- Ajul: Twin brother of Ixul, with whom he is conducting a secret relationship. The two are the descendants of the Hero Twins of mythology. Ajul is preparing to become co-ruler of Tzoyna with his sister, through a ritual game in which captives are sacrificed to the gods. Ajul, instead, finds himself under attack and imprisoned, forced to participate in the games as an intended sacrifice. He believes that it is his duty to conform to what fate has wrought for him.
- Ixul: Twin sister of Ajul, she refuses to be complacent in the face of challenge, and believes that it is their duty to survive, no matter the religious or philosophical ramifications of their actions.
- Ket: Younger sister of Ixul and Ajul. She begins to experience prophetic visions, and it is through her eyes that we learn about the social hierarchies, discontents, and ultimate rebellion that are at the heart of the Mayan society.

Present (2012):

- Leah Oliveri: The daughter of a white Catholic mother, who conceived her during a missionary trip to Belize. Leah has never known her father, who is no longer alive, but is determined to search after her Belizean roots. She travels to Belmopan, the capital of Belize, where she meets two guides to the cave sacred to the Maya, Actun Tunichil Muknal. She forms a relationship with each of the guides, and discovers that they are brothers. She is determined to explore the forbidden and dangerous parts of the cave, to find out what the significance of the past is, to her and in general.
- Javier Magaña: Estranged twin brother of Xander, he was raised by their father after their parents separated. He is a tour guide with ambitions to rise in his profession. He is gregarious and generally satisfied with his lot in life, and tries to envision a domestic future with Leah.
- Xander Cañul: Brother of Javier, he was raised by an abusive mother. Though he works as a tourist guide, Xander is critical of the tourism industry and its effects on Belize. He is writing a thesis on "the tourist gaze", but his academic ambitions are thwarted by the difficulty in obtaining a visa to study and work in the United States or Europe.

Future (3012):

- Niloux deCayo: A member of the futuristic nomadic society (the viajeras) in which it is forbidden to own possessions or remain in a single place for very long. No families exist, rather, life is structured communally and cooperatively, with members joining orders based on the religion that arose around the events surrounding Leah, Xander, and Javier's story, and which incorporates beliefs in reincarnation and Mayan cosmology. Niloux questions some of the strictures and beliefs at the root of her culture, in particular claiming that Xibalba is a metaphor, and that Leah did not physically cross over to the underworld. She is branded a heretic by Tanaaj, who is determined to silence and exile her.
- Tanaaj deCayo: A religious conservative who forms a sweeping movement in opposition to Niloux, in an effort to preserve the viajeras' way of life that has risen to ensure human survival after the climatic disaster that threatened their survival. Her fundamentalism is ultimately challenged when she allows herself to acknowledge the significance of family connections, which she had repressed for so long.

== Reception ==
The novel was positively received by critics. In his New Scientist review, Michael Marshall calls it a "stone-cold masterpiece", praising the pacing, characters, and societies. In Locus, Ian Mond lauds how Byrne "combines scholarly work with an appreciation and skill for world-building". He further appreciates how Byrne "raises questions about identity, about gender and sexual preference, about the limits and constraints inherent in any true utopia, " adding that "(t)hese issues are explored with a great deal of wit, passion, and intelligence, but what stands out is the book’s attitude to the past", which Mond considers to be key to tying together the three timelines.

The Tor.com review called it "one of the most effective examples of worldbuilding you’re likely to see on a page this year", deeming it an "epic, visceral novel" that "bristles with ambition". The Ancillary Review of Books reviewer found herself "blown away by the epic sweep, emotional complexity, and intensely thoughtful socioeconomic structural building Byrne brings to her work", while the Fantasy Hive review found The Actual Star to be a "speculative fiction masterpiece that speaks to our current anxieties and concerns whilst imagining a way through them. Dizzying in its implication and epic in scope, it nevertheless is a book of real human warmth and understanding, firmly rooted in the lived experiences of its characters."
