= Great Blue Hole =

Marine sinkhole off the coast of Belize

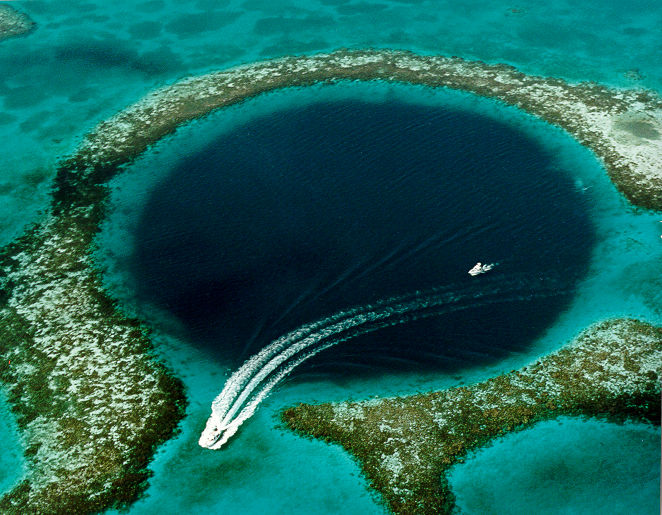
- The Great Blue Hole
- Interactive map of Great Blue Hole
- Location: Lighthouse Reef, Belize
- Coordinates: 17°18′55″N 87°32′4″W
- Depth: 124 m (407 ft)

Location of the Great Blue Hole off the east coast of Belize.

The Great Blue Hole is a large marine sinkhole off the coast of Belize. It lies near the center of Lighthouse Reef, a small atoll 70 km (43 mi) from the mainland and Belize City. The hole is circular in shape, 318 m (1,043 ft) across and 124 m (407 ft) deep. It has a surface area of 70,650 square metres (760,500 sq ft). It was formed during several phases of the Quaternary glaciation when sea levels were much lower. Analysis of stalactites found in the Great Blue Hole shows that formation took place 153,000, 66,000, 60,000, and 15,000 years ago. As the ocean began to rise again, the cave was flooded. The Great Blue Hole is part of the larger Belize Barrier Reef Reserve System, a UNESCO World Heritage Site.

== Exploration ==
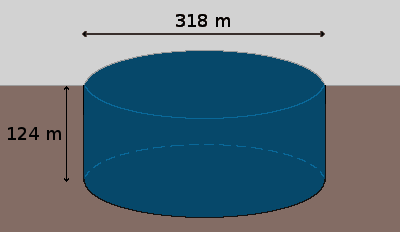
Simplified dimensions of the hole

The site was made famous by Jacques Cousteau, who declared it one of the top five scuba diving sites in the world. In 1971 he brought his ship, the Calypso, to the hole to chart its depths. Investigations by this expedition confirmed the hole's origin as typical karst limestone formations, formed before rises in sea level in at least four stages, leaving ledges at depths of 21 m (69 ft), 49 m (161 ft), and 91 m (299 ft). Stalactites were retrieved from submerged caves, confirming their previous formation above sea level. Some of these stalactites were also off-vertical by 5˚ in a consistent orientation, indicating that there had also been some past geological shift and tilting of the underlying plateau, followed by a long period in the current plane. The tilt indicates that this was movement of the land, rather than a rise in sea level alone. The initial measured depth of the Great Blue Hole was about 125 m (410 ft) which is the most often cited depth up to this day.

An expedition was conducted in the summer of 1997 to collect core samples from the Blue Hole's floor and document the cave system. To accomplish these tasks, all of the divers had to be certified in cave diving and mixed gases.

In December 2018, two submarines descended into the Blue Hole in an attempt to map its interior. Using sonar scanning, the team was nearly able to complete a 3-D map of the 1,000-foot-wide (300 m) hole. One of their discoveries was a layer of hydrogen sulfide at a depth of approximately 300 feet (91 m). The water at that depth and below becomes dark, anoxic and devoid of life. The submarine expedition also discovered the bodies of two divers at the bottom, out of three believed to have gone missing while diving there, and reported them to Belizean authorities. Out of respect, the crew declined to bring the bodies back to land, thus leaving them buried at sea.

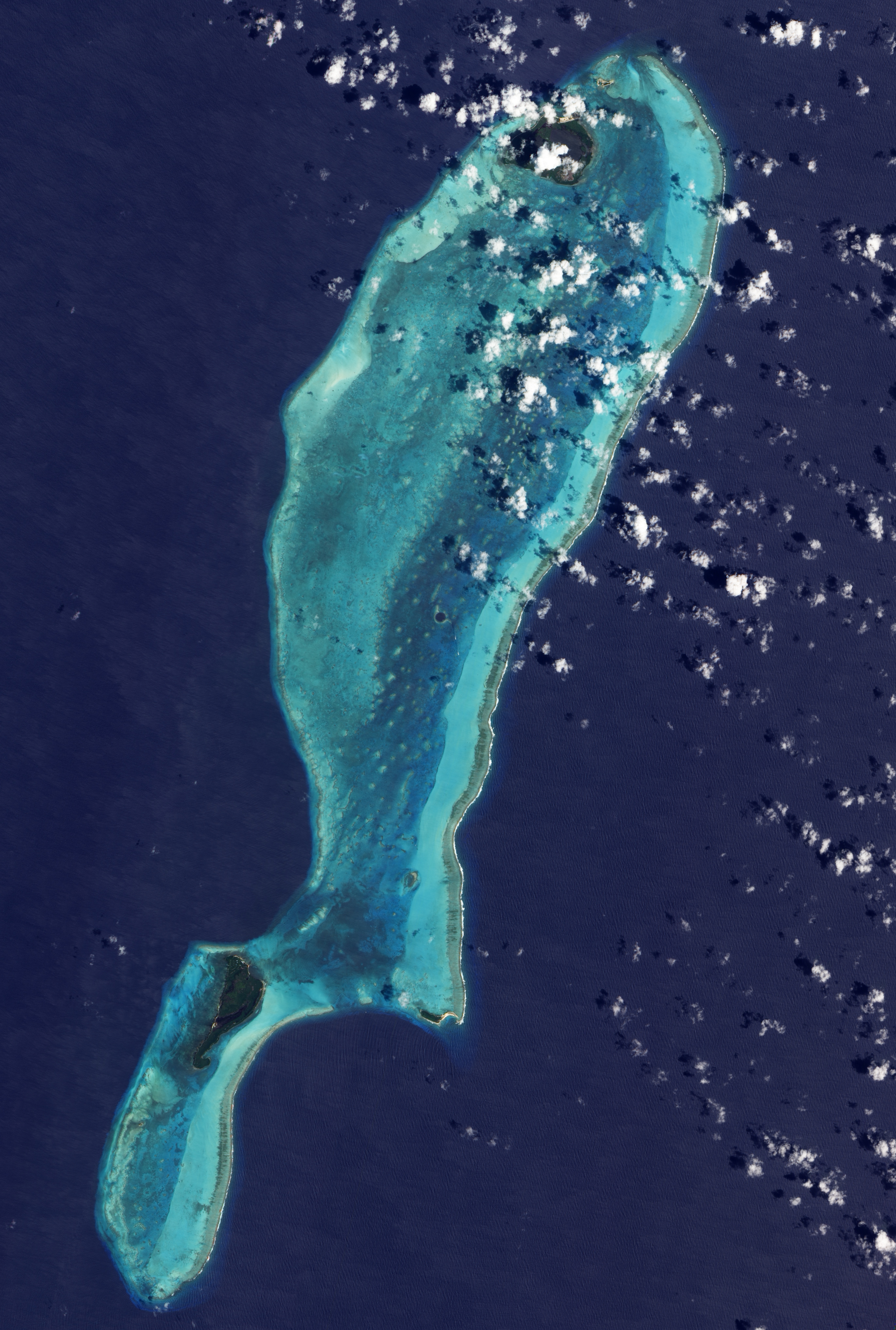
The Great Blue Hole is near the center of the Lighthouse Reef.

== Tourism ==
In 2012, Discovery Channel ranked the Great Blue Hole as number one on its list of "The 10 Most Amazing Places on Earth". In 2018, they featured a two-hour special titled Discovery Live: Into the Blue Hole featuring Erika Bergman, Fabien Cousteau and Richard Branson.

== Ecology ==
The rim of the Great Blue Hole supports a community of coral and tropical fish, with the shallow reef edge reaching approximately 5 metres (16 ft) in depth before sloping gradually to 10 metres (33 ft) and then dropping to a near-vertical cliff.

The Blue Hole is a habitat for species such as groupers, squirrelfish, angelfish, butterflyfish, and midnight parrotfish. The site is also inhabited by reef sharks such as nurse sharks, the Caribbean reef shark, and the blacktip shark. Sea anemones, Pederson's cleaner shrimp, and neon gobies are also found in the area.

== See also ==
- List of caves in Belize
