= Comfort Nwuchiola =

Nigerian politician

Comfort Nwuchiola Egwaba is a Nigerian politician. She currently serves as the Deputy Speaker of Kogi State House of Assembly. She is the first female deputy speaker in Kogi State.

== Career ==
In 2023, the Kogi State House of Assembly appointed Comfort as its new Deputy Speaker, following the resignation of the former officeholder, Rt Hon Enema Paul. Prior to this appointment, she had served as a member of the Federal House of Representatives, representing the Ibaji constituency.
