= Actun Tunichil Muknal =

Cave in Belize

- Cave of the Crystal Sepulchre
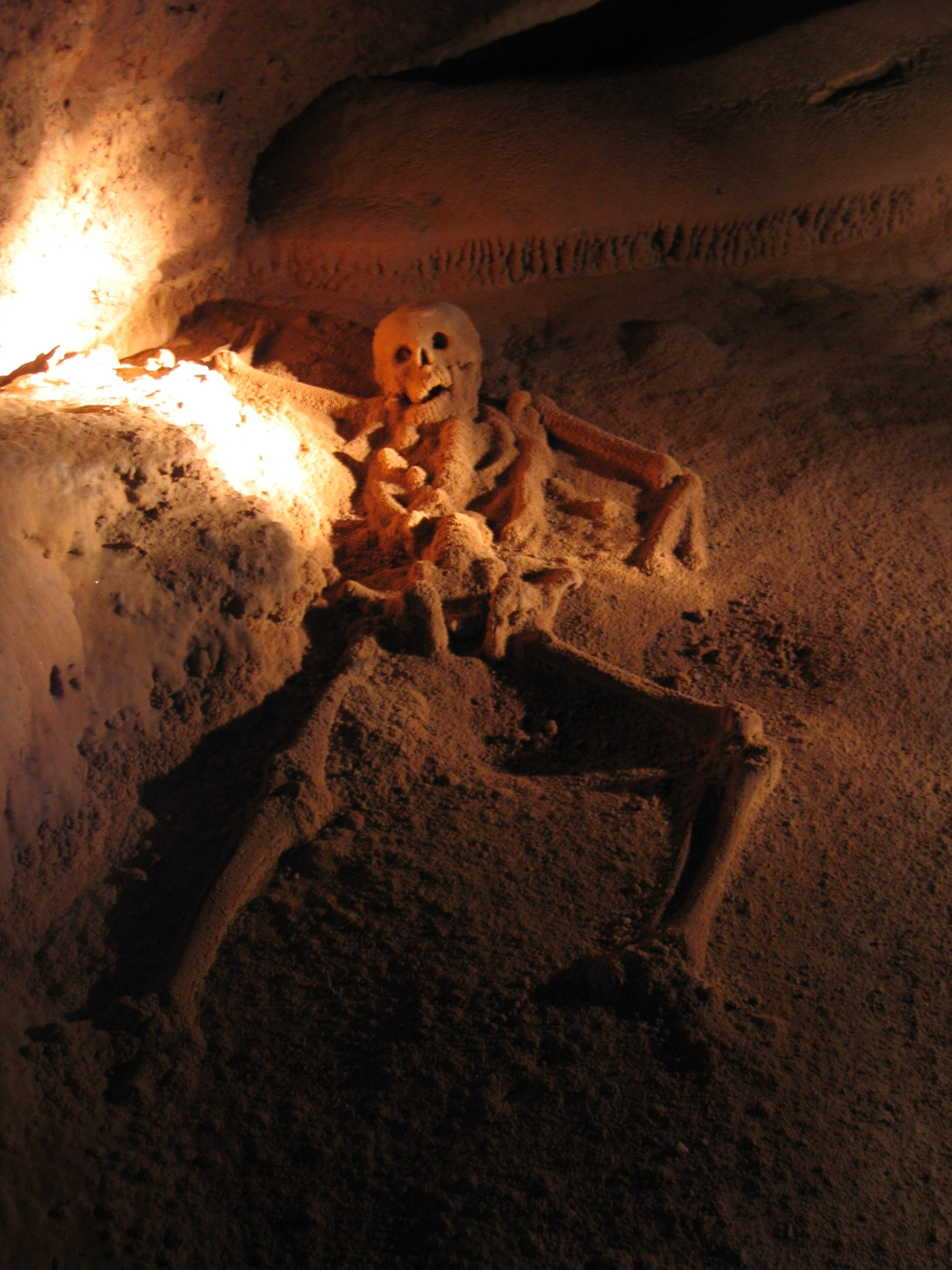
- The Crystal Maiden

- Location in Belize
- 17°7′48″N 88°51′57″W
- Location: Near San Ignacio, Cayo District
- Region: Belize

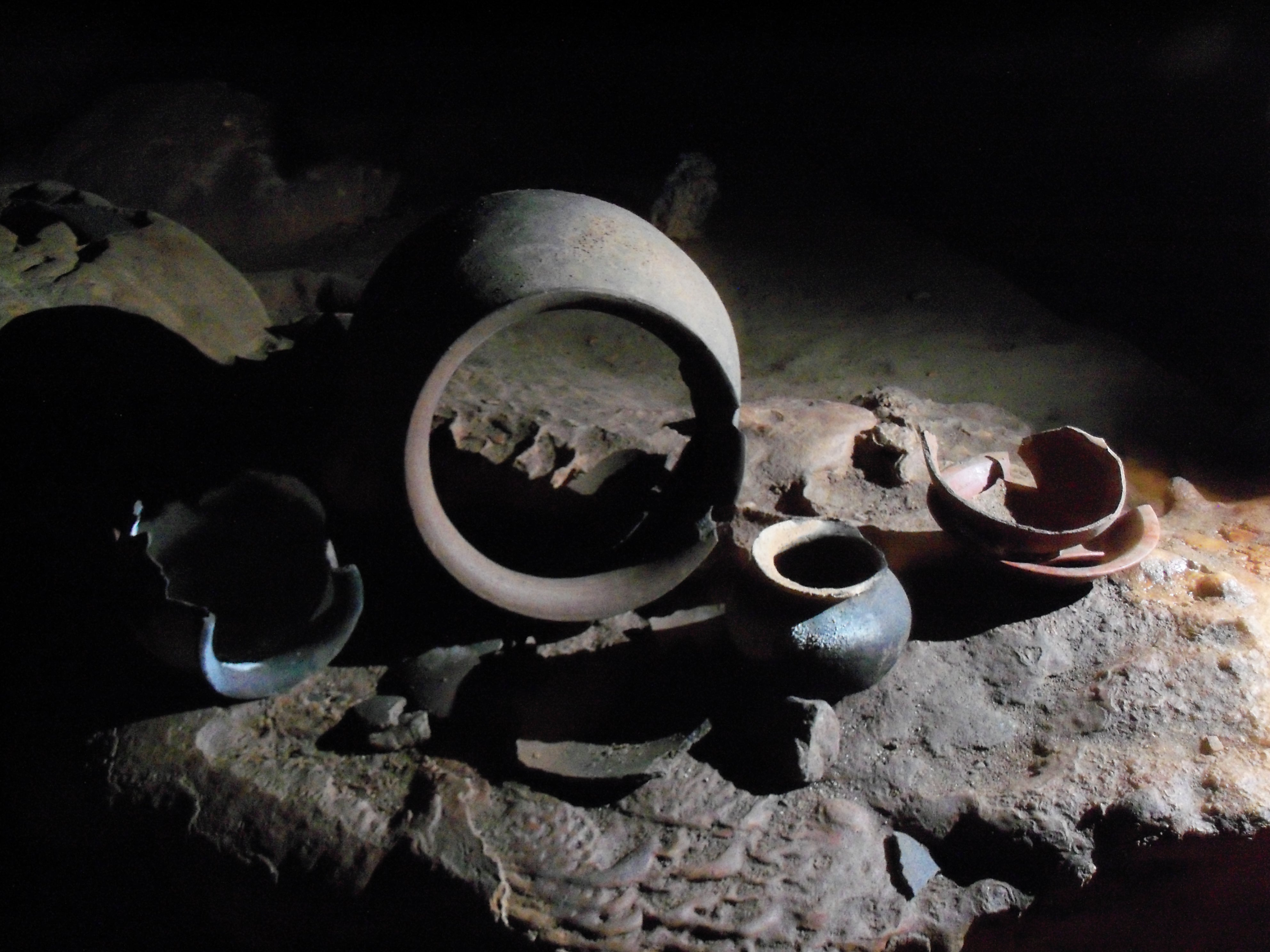
Maya pottery

Actun Tunichil Muknal (the Cave of the Crystal Sepulchre), also known locally as ATM, is a cave in Belize, near San Ignacio, Cayo District, notable as a Maya archaeological site that includes skeletons, ceramics, and stoneware. There are several areas with skeletal remains in the main chamber. The best known is "The Crystal Maiden", the skeleton of what is believed to be a 17-year-old boy, possibly a sacrifice victim, whose bones have been calcified to a sparkling, crystallized appearance.

The ceramics at the site are significant partly because they are marked with "kill holes" (holes created to release spirits lurking within), which indicate that they were used for ceremonial purposes. Many of the Maya artifacts and remains are completely calcified to the cave floor. One artifact, named the "Monkey Pot", is one of just four of its type found in Central America. The Maya also modified cave formations here, in some instances to create altars for the offerings. Though not proven, it is speculated that these formations deliberately cast shadowed silhouettes of faces and animals into the cave. The cave is extensively decorated with cave formations in the upper passages.

Animal life in the cave includes a large population of bats, large freshwater crabs, crayfish, catfish and other tropical fish. Large invertebrates like amblypygi and various predatory spiders also inhabit the cave. Agouti and otters may also use the cave. These and many other species are quite common in river caves of this size in Belize.

Other Maya archaeological sites in the vicinity are Cahal Pech, Chaa Creek, El Pilar, Xunantunich, and Midnight Terror Cave.

Actun Tunichil Muknal should not be confused with Actun Tun Kul in the Chiquibul Cave System.

== Tourism ==
The Belize Tourism Board, in coordination with the Belize National Institute of Culture and History, Institute of Archaeology, has granted licenses to a small group of agents to conduct tours to this cave, in an attempt to balance its protection against tourist revenue.

The cave is located in the Tapir Mountain Nature Reserve. The main cave system is about 3 mi (4.8 km) long and consists of a long river passage for approximately 2 mi (3.2 km), which ends at an upstream sump. A series of upper prehistoric passages continues another mile past the sump through massive breakdown boulders and giant rooms. The cave can be exited through a tight squeeze ending in a giant sink hole collapse in the jungle. The cave's upper passage is located about 1/3 of the way in from the lower entrance. Here 14 skeletal remains have been found, and numerous examples of ancient Maya pottery remain.

The cave periodically closes when rainfall causes the river's water level to rise and potentially flood parts of the cave.

== Conservation ==
In late May 2012, a tourist accidentally dropped a camera and fractured a human skull estimated to be over one thousand years old. As a result, all cameras without a permit are banned from the cave. A different visitor once broke another skull by accidentally stepping on it. All visitors are told to remove their shoes and wear socks when reaching the upper dry chamber to help minimize foot traffic impact.

== Media ==
Ghost Hunters International season 3 episode 9 "The Crystal Maiden: Belize and France" evaluated the ghost stories behind the mysterious maiden. National Geographic listed it as #1 on their list of Top 10 Sacred Caves. The cave and its tourism are a main subject of the speculative science fiction novel The Actual Star.

== See also ==
- Maya cave sites
