= Caribbean Coral Reef Ecosystems Program =

US-based research program

The Caribbean Coral Reef Ecosystems (CCRE) program began with a collaborative field project conceived by six National Museum of Natural History scientists during the early 1970s. The scientists interests included a range of disciplines central to reef ecology, including: invertebrate and vertebrate zoology, botany, carbonate geology, and paleobiology. The primary work site is the Carrie Bow Marine Field Station, a research station at Carrie Bow Caye (16°48′9″N 88°4′55″W) on the Meso-American Barrier Reef in Belize. The program is an extended duration study of coral reefs, mangroves, sea grass meadows, and the sandy bottoms. It has been a functioning research program since the early 1970s when it was called the Investigations of Marine Shallow-Water Ecosystems (IMSWE).

== Research over the years ==
The site grew quickly and within ten years, 65 scientists and graduate students worked at the station, and more than 100 research papers were published on the fauna, flora, and geology of the reef. To date, there have been over 500 publications based on research done at the station.

== History ==
=== Early years ===
In 1972 the Carrie Bow Caye location was chosen for its rampant growth, its secluded location, its size and its distance from research centers on land. Between 1972-1975 there were very few resources and equipment when the program was getting started. The program's initial objectives were to make maps of the area and where near reefs were as well as to identify key species in the ecosystem.

=== Next Step ===
In 1975 a grant from Exxon Corporation was awarded, which doubled the funding of the CCRE program. Aerial photographs of the reef were also taken allowing for highly detailed mapping of the area. In 1978 hurricane Greta passed across the Belize Barrier Reef and caused severe damage to the equipment and buildings of the Carrie Bow station and the reef. Even with this setback the team published their findings. The book is known as the Blue Book, which became the stepping off for their future investigations, and further funding.

=== 1980s ===
In the 1980s, the team turned some of their attention to the highly bio-diverse mangrove swamps, just north-west of the Carrie Bow. Because the mangroves are both terrestrial and aquatic ecosystems, the team was able to diversify their research and start terrestrial studies. In 1985, the National Museum of Natural History received money from the US Congress to study the Caribbean Coral Reef Ecosystem (CCRE); this would become the new name of the research initiative.

=== 1990s ===
In 1997, as many projects were coming to an end, a fire left the station little more than rubble and ashes.

=== 21st Century ===
The reef has been struck by a number of hurricanes, causing substantial damage and erosion to the beaches and CCRE facilities. The damages caused have led to many infrastructure changes and improvements to the facilities. Most recently, Valerie Paul took over as the CCRE Director.
