= Nohoch Cheʼen =

Belizean archaeological reserve

Nohoch Cheʼen, also commonly known as Caves Branch, is an archaeological reserve in Belize, consisting of a network of limestone caves.
