= Bob McPhail (rugby) =

English rugby footballer

Personal information
- Full name: Robert McPhail
- Born: Wakefield, England
- Died: unknown

Playing information

Rugby union
Club
Years	Team	Pld	T	G	FG	P
	Sandal St. Helens RFC
	Headingley FC
1902/03	Wakefield RFC
	Total	0	0	0	0	0
Representative
Years	Team	Pld	T	G	FG	P
1902/03	Yorkshire	3

Rugby league
- Position: Centre
Club
Years	Team	Pld	T	G	FG	P
1904–08/09	Wakefield Trinity	110	19	1	0	59
Representative
Years	Team	Pld	T	G	FG	P
1906	Yorkshire	1	0	0	0	0

Bob McPhail (birth unknown – death unknown) was an English rugby union and professional rugby league footballer who played in the 1900s, he was one of five brothers, four of whom played rugby. He played representative level rugby union (RU) for Yorkshire, and at club level for Sandal St. Helen's RFC (in Sandal Magna, Wakefield), Headingley FC and Wakefield RFC, and representative level rugby league (RL) for Yorkshire, and at club level for Wakefield Trinity, as a centre.

== Background ==
Bob McPhail was born in Wakefield, West Riding of Yorkshire, England.

== Playing career ==
=== Rugby union career ===
Bob McPhail started his rugby career with Sandal St Helen's RFC before joining Headingley FC where he played alongside elder brother John McPhail. Both later joined Wakefield RFC. Bob scored at least four tries for Wakefield RFC during the 1902/03 season. In the same season he played three times for Yorkshire RFU.

=== Rugby league career ===
He made his début for Wakefield Trinity during April 1904, and he played his last match for Wakefield Trinity during the 1908–09 season.
