= Enema Paul =

Nigerian politician (died 2024)

Federal Representative
- Constituency: Okura

Personal details
- Died: 14 December 2024
- Occupation: Politician

Enema Paul (died 14 December 2024) was a Nigerian politician. He was a Deputy Speaker and member of the Federal House of Representatives, representing Okura State Constituency of Kogi State in the 8th National Assembly. He died on 14 December 2024.

Paul died from at a private hospital in Abuja, on 14 December 2024. Prior to his death, he had stepped down as Deputy Speaker of the Kogi State House of Assembly on health grounds and was subsequently replaced by Comfort Ojoma Nwuchiola, the member representing Ibaji State Constituency.
