= Che Chem Ha Cave =

Mayan Ceremonial Cave in Belize

- Poison Water Cave
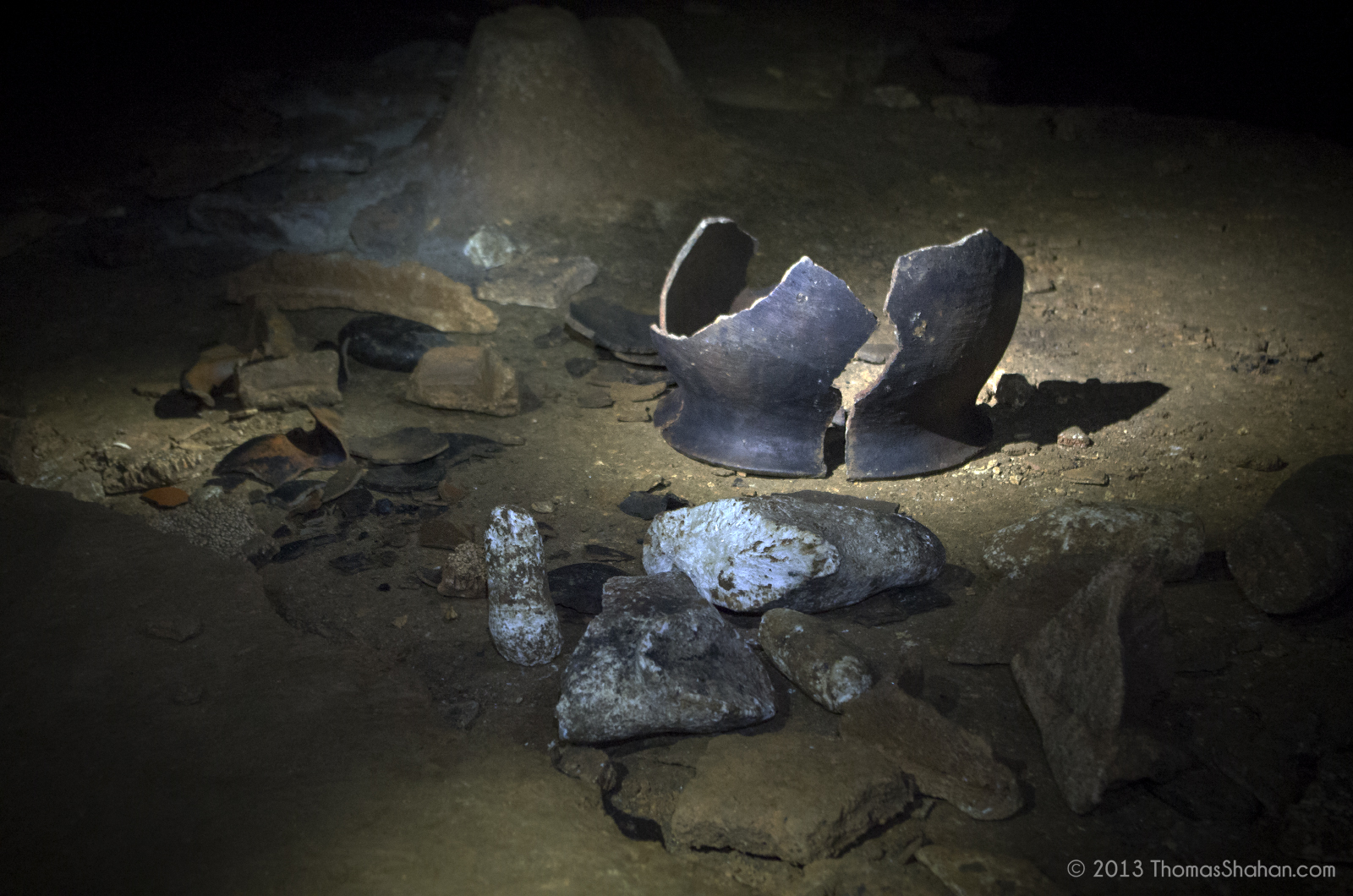

- Location within Mesoamerica Location within Belize
- 17°1′34.38″N 89°3′53.8″W
- Cultures: Mayas
- Location: 8 miles southeast of Benque Viejo, Belize
- Region: Cayo District

Che Chem Ha Cave or Chechem Ha Cave is a Mayan ceremonial nave, now a tourist destination. It is located 8 miles (13 km) southeast of Benque at the start of the Maya Mountains of Belize.

== Description ==
The Che Chem Ha Cave (Poison Water Cave) entrance is a small hole which leads to the main tunnel (200 m or 220 yd long), this tunnel connects to a large chamber which then connects many other small chambers high up within the cave. This cave contains many ancient Mayan artifacts so it is heavily protected to ensure the preservation of these items so visitors are only allowed to enter when escorted by a tour guide.

== Discovery ==
This cave was first discovered in 1989 by a local farmer, William Morales, while he was hunting with his dog. His dog ran into a hole within a mountain of boulders and he followed the dog and discovered the entrance of the cave. After Morales entered the cave he stumbled across hundreds of pottery vessels and other untouched artifacts left behind by the Mayans.

== Archaeology ==
This cave contains a main chamber filled with rocks lined up which is believed to have been used for sacred Mayan rituals dating from the middle preclassic period (900-300BC) to the late classic period (700-850AD). Also, there are many chambers found high up within the cave which contain many large pottery vessels which may have been used to collect 'pure water' to be used for their rituals.
