= Ṣọlá Olúlòde =

British Nigerian artist

- Born: 1996 (age 29–30); London
- Education: University of Brighton
- Occupation: Mixed media artist

Ṣọlá Olúlòde (born 1996) is a British Nigerian artist. Her mixed-media work frequently celebrates relationships among Black queer women.

== Early life and education ==
Ṣọlá Olúlòde was born in London in 1996. She comes from a Nigerian family.

In 2018, she graduated with a bachelor's in fine art painting from the University of Brighton. She returned to London to pursue a career as an artist.

== Work ==
Olúlòde is known for her mixed-media work combining techniques and materials like painting, pastels, natural dying, and wax. She is inspired by textile traditions such as batik and Yoruba adire. Her pieces often feature monochromatic color schemes.

Themes of Olúlòde's work include queerness and the lives of British Black women and nonbinary people. She puts a particular emphasis on joyful, tender intimacies between women, drawing in part from her own experiences as a queer woman.

Olúlòde's art has appeared in various U.K. galleries including the Carl Freedman Gallery and Lisson Gallery. In 2022, she presented the solo show "Could You Be Love" at New York's Sapar Contemporary Gallery, followed by the 2023 solo show "Burning, like the star that showed us to our love" at the Ed Cross Art Gallery in London. Her first solo exhibition in Nigeria, "Stars Fell on Lagos," appeared at the Wunika Mukan Gallery in 2025.

In 2026, paintings by Olúlòde were featured in the exhibition "Here: Pride and Belonging in African Art" at the Smithsonian's National Museum of African Art in Washington, D.C. The works, Stitched to You (2022) and Eternal Light (2020), incorporate batik textile techniques.
