= Valerie Paul =

American ecologist

Valerie J. Paul
- Education: University of California at San Diego Scripps Institution of Oceanography at UC San Diego
- Scientific career
- Fields: Marine Ecology
- Workplaces: Smithsonian Marine Station at Fort Pierce, Fort Pierce, FL University of Guam Marine Laboratory

Valerie J. Paul is the Director of the Smithsonian Marine Station at Fort Pierce, in Fort Pierce, FL since 2002 and the Head Scientist of the Chemical Ecology Program. She is interested in marine chemical ecology, and specializes in researching the ecology and chemistry of Cyanobacteria, blue-green algae, blooms. She has been a fellow of the American Association for the Advancement of Science since 1996, and was the chairperson of the Marine Natural Products Gordon Research Conference in 2000.

== Life and career ==
Paul graduated from the University of California at San Diego in 1979 with a BA in Biology and Studies in Chemical Ecology and then in 1985 with a PhD in Marine Biology at the University of San Diego Scripps Institution of Oceanography. She started working at the University of Guam Marine Laboratory in 1985, became director of the laboratory in 1991 until 1994, and then full professor in 1993. In 2002 she accepted a position at the Smithsonian Marine Station in Fort Pierce as Head Scientist and Director of the Caribbean Coral Reef Ecosystems.

She researches marine chemical ecology, marine plant and herbivore interactions, coral reef ecology, and the ecological roles of marine natural products. More specifically in her coral reef ecology research she studies the impact of cyanobacterial bloom on coral reefs and larvae of reef building corals.

She has been a council member of the International Society for Reef Studies from 1992-1996, advisory editor for Coral Reefs since 1993, a member of the editorial advisory board of the Journal of Natural Products from 2004 to 2008, and a member of the California Sea Grant Committee from 2000 to 2001 and 2006 to 2007. She was also elected and served as the chair for the Marine Natural Products Gordon Research Conference in 2000 and as the vice-chair in 1998 and she was the program director of the NIH Minority Biomedical Research Support Grant from 1990 to 2002. Paul was elected a fellow of the American Association for the Advancement of Science in 1996.

== Select publications ==
Paul is the author or co-author of more than 275 papers and review articles. Listed here are the top 10 cited of her papers of all time:

- HW Paerl, VJ Paul. 2012. Climate change: links to global expansion of harmful cyanobacteria. Water research 46 (5), 1349-1363. https://tropicalsoybean.com/sites/default/files/Climate%20Change%20-%20Links%20To%20Global%20Expansion%20Of%20Harmful%20Cyanobacteria_Paerl%20&%20Paul_2012.pdf.
- K Taori, VJ Paul, H Luesch. 2008. Structure and Activity of Largazole, a Potent Antiproliferative Agent from the Floridian Marine Cyanobacterium Symploca sp. Journal of the American Chemical Society 130 (6), 1806-1807.https://repository.si.edu/bitstream/handle/10088/3651/713Largazole_Structure.pdf.
- H Luesch, WY Yoshida, RE Moore, VJ Paul, TH Corbett. 2001. Total Structure Determination of Apratoxin A, a Potent Novel Cytotoxin from the Marine Cyanobacterium Lyngbya majuscula. Journal of the American Chemical Society 123 (23), 5418-5423. https://pubs.acs.org/doi/abs/10.1021/ja010453j.
- MG Hadfield, VJ Paul. 2001. Natural chemical cues for settlement and metamorphosis of marine invertebrate larvae. Marine chemical ecology, 431-461. https://www.researchgate.net/profile/Michael_Hadfield/publication/265222439_Natural_Chemical_Cues_for_Settlement_and_Metamorphosis_of_Marine-Invertebrate_Larvae/links/54e3963b0cf2b2314f5d9a12/Natural-Chemical-Cues-for-Settlement-and-Metamorphosis-of-Marine-Invertebrate-Larvae.pdf
- IB Kuffner, LJ Walters, MA Becerro, VJ Paul, R Ritson-Williams, KS Beach. 2006. Inhibition of coral recruitment by macroalgae and cyanobacteria. Marine Ecology Progress Series 323, 107-117. https://www.int-res.com/articles/meps2006/323/m323p107.pdf.
- H Luesch, RE Moore, VJ Paul, SL Mooberry, TH Corbett. 2001. Isolation of Dolastatin 10 from the Marine Cyanobacterium Symploca Species VP642 and Total Stereochemistry and Biological Evaluation of Its Analogue Symplostatin 1. Journal of Natural Products 64 (7), 907-910. https://pubs.acs.org/doi/abs/10.1021/np010049y.
- VJ Paul. 1992. Ecological roles of marine natural products. Explorations in chemical ecology (USA).
- S Dobretsov, M Teplitski, V Paul. 2009. Mini-review: quorum sensing in the marine environment and its relationship to biofouling. Biofouling 25 (5), 413-427.https://www.tandfonline.com/doi/abs/10.1080/08927010902853516.
- VJ Paul, ME Hay. 1986. Seaweed susceptibility to herbivory: chemical and morphological correlates. Marine Ecology Progress Series, 255-264. https://smartech.gatech.edu/bitstream/handle/1853/34323/1986_MEPS_001.pdf.
- DG Corley, R Herb, RE Moore, PJ Scheuer, VJ Paul. 1988. Laulimalides. New potent cytotoxic macrolides from a marine sponge and a nudibranch predator. The Journal of Organic Chemistry 53 (15), 3644-3646. https://pubs.acs.org/doi/abs/10.1021/jo00250a053?journalCode=joceah.
