= John McPhail =

John McPhail or Macphail may refer to:

- John McPhail (footballer) (1923–2000), Scottish footballer
- John McPhail (director)
- John McPhail (basketball)
- John Macphail (rugby union)
- John MacPhail (born 1955), Scottish footballer
