= Midnight Terror Cave =

Cave in central Belize

Midnight Terror Cave is a cave in central Belize that was discovered in 2006 near Springfield. The site was worked on by California State University, Los Angeles' field school as part of the Western Belize Regional Cave Project under Dr. Jaime Awe. The cave contained around 9000 human bones, from at least 118 individuals, and is one of the largest sacrificial assemblages ever discovered in the Maya Lowlands.

The site is thought to have been a site of human sacrifice to the Maya rain god Chaak. An analysis of 100 teeth found at the site showed around a quarter to be less worn down than others, suggesting that they came from the mouths of children. The enamel of the teeth showed that these children had travelled to the site from more than 200 miles away.

Peer-reviewed articles have discussed preliminary findings from the site as well as pathological findings.

Other Maya archaeological sites in the vicinity are Cahal Pech, Chaa Creek, El Pilar, Xunantunich, and Actun Tunichil Muknal.
