= Justin Paul (scholar) =

Professor of business administration

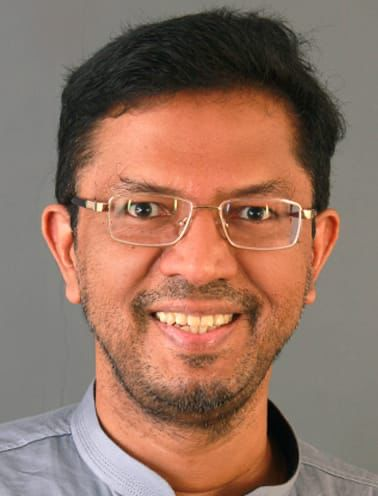
- Born: Kerala, India
- Education: University of Brighton, Indian Institute of Technology-Bombay, Christ College
- Scientific career
- Fields: Business administration
- Workplaces: University of Puerto Rico
- Website: drjustinpaul.com

Justin Paul is an Indian-born business scholar. He is a professor of business administration at the University of Puerto Rico. He served as Provost and Dean of the School of Business Management at NMIMS University in Bombay, and as editor-in-chief of the International Journal of Consumer Studies.

== Early life and education ==
Justin Paul was born in Kerala, India. He received his early education from the Government LP School, St. Joseph's UP School, and Sree Krishna High School Mattathur.

Paul attended the Indian Institute of Technology Bombay, where he received his PhD in 2003. In 2023, he obtained a second PhD in marketing from the University of Brighton.

== Career ==
Paul began his career as a bank officer at Corporation Bank. In 2004, he joined Indian Institute of Management, Indore as an assistant professor and was promoted as department chair in 2005.

In 2008, Paul moved to Japan to become an associate professor with Nagoya University of Commerce and Business, where he also served as MBA program director. In 2011, he joined the faculty at the University of Washington. A year later, he became an associate professor at the Graduate School of Business, University of Puerto Rico. He was promoted to full professor in 2015.

Paul was editor-in-chief of the International Journal of Consumer Studies for 6 years from 2020 through 2025.

In 2024, Paul was appointed as dean of the School of Business Management and provost at NMIMS.

Paul received an honorary Doctorate (Doctor Honoris Causa) from "Dunarea de Jos" University of Galati, Romania in March 2026 for his contributions to research, including the Masstige Model for brand management, the 7-P framework for international marketing.

== Books ==
- Paul, Justin (2009). International Business (6 ed.). Prentice Hall. ISBN 978-81-203-2426-8.
- Paul, Justin; Kapoor, K (2012). International Marketing (2 ed.). McGraw-Hill. ISBN 978-1259001802.
- Paul, Justin; Kaushal, Leena; Sebastian, VJ (2012). Managerial Economics. Cengage. ISBN 9788131516874.
- Justin, Paul; Aserkar, R (2013). Export-Import Management (2 ed.). Oxford University Press. ISBN 9780198089407.
- Justin, Paul (2018). Business Environment: Text and Cases (4 ed.). McGraw-Hill. ISBN 978-9353162498.
- Paul, Justin; Suresh, P (2018). Management of Banking and Financial Services (4 ed.). Pearson Education India. ISBN 978-9353062378.
- George, Babu; Paul, Justin, eds. (2019). Digital Transformation in Business and Society | Theory and Cases. Springer International Publishing. ISBN 9783030082772.
