= Chiquibul Cave System =

Large cave system in Central America

The Chiquibul Cave System is one of the largest and best-known cave systems in Central America. It consists of four distinct caves along the course of the Chiquibul River; Actun Kabal, Actun Tun Kul (Tunkul) and Cebada Cave in Belize, and Xibalba in Guatemala, as well as several other smaller associated caves. Included within the cave system are two of the largest caverns in the world.

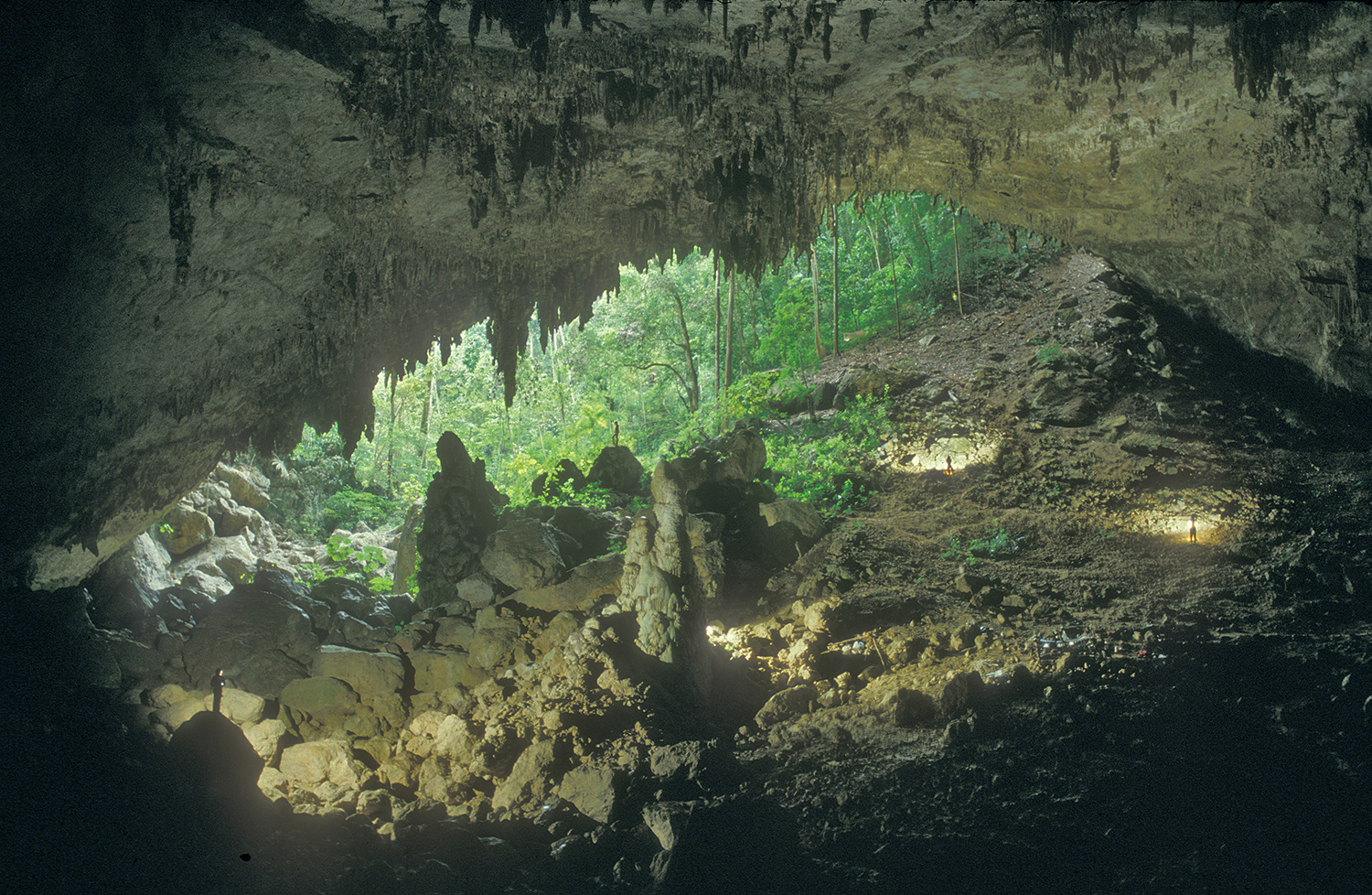
Entrance to Actun Kabal, part of the Chiquibul Cave System, in Belize

== Actun Kabal (Kabal Group) ==
This upper section of the Chiquibul Cave System has over 12 km of mapped passages with a depth of -95 m. Included is Chiquibul Chamber, at 250 m by 150 m one of the world's largest caverns.

== Actun Tun Kul ==
Tun Kul ("stone drum") includes Belize Chamber - with dimensions of 300 m by 150 m by 65 m, it is one of the largest natural caverns in the world. Tun Kul was connected with Cebada Cave in 1999 resulting in a 39 km long cave.

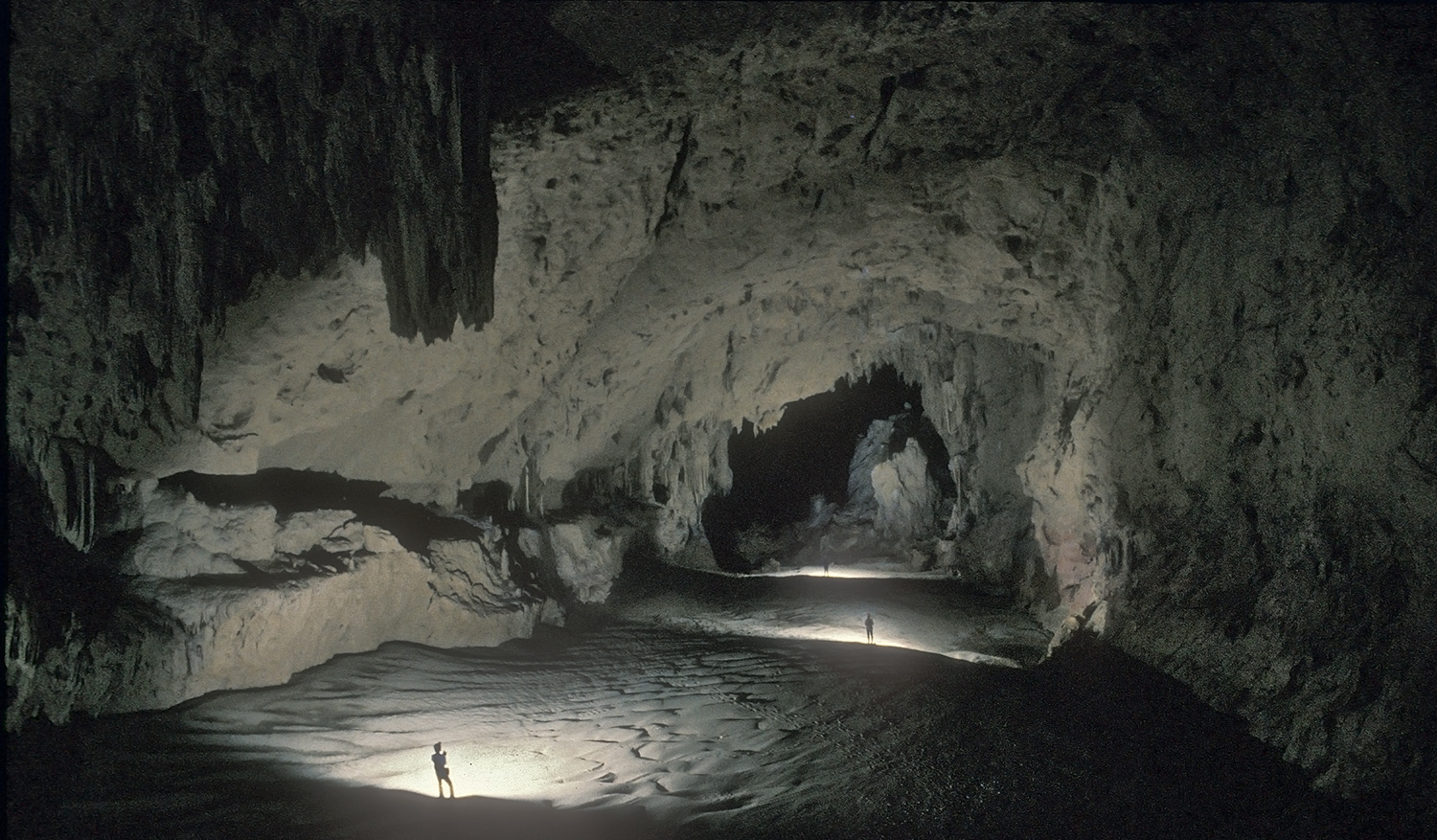
Huge cave passage in Actun Kabal, part of the Chiquibul Cave System, in Belize

== Cebada Cave ==
Cebada Cave and Tun Kul were linked in 1999; at 39 km it is the longest cave in Belize.

== Xibalba ==
This downstream section of the Chiquibul Cave System is entirely within Guatemala, and at -187 m was briefly that country's deepest cave (currently Jul Mas Nim, at -294 m). Over seven kilometres of passages have been mapped, including some that are over 100 m wide. The cave entrance is 200 m across.

== Exploration ==
Cavers Mike Boon and Tom Miller visited the area in 1971 and 1982 respectively, with Miller initiating the first cave explorations as part of his PhD work. Miller followed up with major international, interdisciplinary expeditions in 1984, 1986, 1988 and 2001, partially funded by National Geographic and the National Speleological Society. The first expedition surveyed 23 km of dry cave passages in Kabal and Tun Kul at the upstream part of the system, ending at a sump at the end of Tun Kul. The second expedition surveyed 27 km of dry and river passages in Cebada and Xibalba. The third expedition attempted but failed to connect Cebada with Tun Kul. In 1990 a comprehensive cave survey was prepared by Steve Grundy and Olivia Whitwell.

== Biology ==
Biological collections and observations were conducted in 1986 in Cebada Cave, and other collections were made in 1984 and 1988. Seventy invertebrate species are known from the system.

== Protection ==
Despite its remoteness, the area is threatened by agricultural activities, fires, illegal logging, wildlife hunting, looting of cultural artifacts, and vandalism of both cultural and geological assets. The Chiquibul Cave System is within Chiquibul National Park, a 264,000-acre reserve in the Maya Mountains massif. In 2007 it was determined that the cave system needed special consideration, and in 2010 The Nature Conservancy presented a five-year management plan which includes provisions for controlled tourism on a very limited basis.
