= List of Otherwise Award winners =

Otherwise Award
- Description: Annual literary prize for works of science fiction or fantasy that expand or explore the understanding of gender
- Country: United States
- Presented by: Discussed and awarded at WisCon

The following is a list of winners and shortlisted works of the Otherwise Award, an annual literary prize for works of science fiction or fantasy that expand or explore one's understanding of gender. It was initiated (as the James Tiptree Jr. Award) in February 1991 by science fiction authors Pat Murphy and Karen Joy Fowler, and is awarded and discussed yearly at WisCon. The name of the award was changed to its current form in October 2019.

The judges also announce an Honor List each year.

== Winners and Honor List ==
Winning titles are marked by a yellow background.

Otherwise Award winners and Honor List
Year	Author(s)	Work	Publisher	Result	Ref.
1991	Eleanor Arnason	A Woman of the Iron People	William Morrow	Winner	
1991	Gwyneth Jones	White Queen	Victor Gollancz Ltd	Winner	
1991	John Barnes	Orbital Resonance	Tor	Honor	
1991	Karen Joy Fowler	Sarah Canary	Henry Holt and Company	Honor	
1991	Mary Gentle	The Architecture of Desire	Bantam Books	Honor	
1991	Greer Gilman	Moonwise	NAL / Roc Books	Honor	
1991	Marge Piercy	He, She and It	Summit Books	Honor	
1992	Maureen F. McHugh	China Mountain Zhang	Tor	Winner	
1992	Carol Emshwiller	Venus Rising	Edgewood Press	Honor	
1992	Ian R. MacLeod	"Grownups" in Voyages by Starlight	Davis Publications	Honor	
1992	Judith Moffett	Time, Like an Ever-Rolling Stream	St. Martin's Press	Honor	
1992	Kim Stanley Robinson	Red Mars	HarperCollins	Honor	
1992	Sue Thomas	Correspondence	The Women's Press	Honor	
1992	Lisa Tuttle	Lost Futures	Grafton	Honor	
1992	Élisabeth Vonarburg	In the Mother's Land (Chroniques du pays des mères)	Bantam Books	Honor	
1993	Nicola Griffith	Ammonite	Del Ray	Winner	
1993	Eleanor Arnason	Ring of Swords	Tor	Honor	
1993	Margaret Atwood	The Robber Bride	Bantam Books	Honor	
1993	Sybil Claiborne	In the Garden of Dead Cars	Cleis Press	Honor	
1993	L. Timmel Duchamp	"Motherhood" in Full Spectrum 4	Bantam Books	Honor	
1993	Rodrigo Garcia y Robertson	"The Other Magpie"	Bantam Doubleday Dell Magazines	Honor	
1993	James Patrick Kelly	"Chemistry"	Bantam Doubleday Dell Magazines	Honor	
1993	Laurie J. Marks	Dancing Jack	DAW Books	Honor	
1993	Ian McDonald	"Some Strange Desire" in The Best of Omni III	Omni Publications International Ltd.	Honor	
1993	Alice Nunn	Illicit Passage	Woman's Redress Press	Honor	
1993	Paul Park	Coelestis	HarperCollins	Honor	
1994	Ursula K. Le Guin	"The Matter of Seggri" in Crank! #3 Spring 1994	Broken Mirrors Press	Winner	
1994	Nancy Springer	Larque on the Wing	AvoNova	Winner	
1994	Eleanor Arnason	"The Lovers" in Asimov's Science Fiction July 1994	Bantam Doubleday Dell Magazines	Honor	
1994	Suzy McKee Charnas	The Furies	Tor	Honor	
1994	L. Warren Douglas	Cannon's Orb	Del Ray	Honor	
1994	Greg Egan	"Cocoon" in Asimov's Science Fiction May 1994	Bantam Doubleday Dell Magazines	Honor	
1994	Ellen Frye	Amazon Story Bones	Spinsters Ink	Honor	
1994	Gwyneth Jones	North Wind	Victor Gollancz Ltd	Honor	
1994	Graham Joyce and Peter F. Hamilton	"Eat Reecebread" in Interzone #86 August 1994	David Pringle	Honor	
1994	Ursula K. Le Guin	"Forgiveness Day" in Asimov's Science Fiction November 1994	Bantam Doubleday Dell Magazines	Honor	
1994	Ursula K. Le Guin	A Fisherman of the Inland Sea	HarperCollins		
1994	Rachel Pollack	Temporary Agency	St. Martin's Press	Honor	
1994	Geoff Ryman	Unconquered Countries	St. Martin's Press	Honor	
1994	Melissa Scott	Trouble and Her Friends	Tor	Honor	
1994	Delia Sherman	"Young Woman in a Garden" in Xanadu	Tor	Honor	
1994	George Turner	Genetic Soldier	William Morrow	Honor	
1995	Elizabeth Hand	Waking the Moon	HarperPrism	Winner	
1995	Theodore Roszak	The Memoirs of Elizabeth Frankenstein	Random House	Winner	
1995	Kelley Eskridge	"And Salome Danced" in Little Deaths	Millennium / Dell Abyss	Honor	
1995	Kit Reed	Little Sisters of the Apocalypse	Black Ice Books	Honor	
1995	Lisa Tuttle	"Food Man"	Lisa Tuttle (chapbook)	Honor	
1995	Terri Windling (ed.)	The Armless Maiden and Other Stories for Childhood's Survivors	Tor	Honor	
1995	Suzy McKee Charnas	Motherlines	Berkeley-Putnam	Retrospective Award	
1995	Suzy McKee Charnas	Walk to the End of the World	Ballantine	Retrospective Award	
1995	Ursula K. Le Guin	The Left Hand of Darkness	Walker & Co.	Retrospective Award	
1995	Joanna Russ	The Female Man	Bantam Books	Retrospective Award	
1995	Joanna Russ	"When It Changed" in Again, Dangerous Visions	Doubleday	Retrospective Award	
1995	Margaret Atwood	The Handmaid's Tale	Houghton Mifflin	Retrospective Honor	
1995	Iain Banks	The Wasp Factory	Macmillan	Retrospective Honor	
1995	Katherine Burdekin	Swastika Night	Feminist Press	Retrospective Honor	
1995	Octavia E. Butler	Wild Seed	Doubleday	Retrospective Honor	
1995	Samuel R. Delany	Babel-17	Ace	Retrospective Honor	
1995	Samuel R. Delany	Triton	Ace	Retrospective Honor	
1995	Carol Emshwiller	Carmen Dog	Mercury Press	Retrospective Honor	
1995	Sonya Dorman Hess	"When I Was Miss Dow" in Women of Wonder, the Classic Years: Science Fiction by Women from the 1940s to the 1970s	Vintage Books	Retrospective Honor	
1995	Elizabeth A. Lynn	Watchtower	Berkley Books	Retrospective Honor	
1995	Vonda N. McIntyre	Dreamsnake	Houghton Mifflin	Retrospective Honor	
1995	Naomi Mitchison	Memoirs of a Spacewoman	Victor Gollancz Ltd	Retrospective Honor	
1995	Marge Piercy	Woman on the Edge of Time	Fawcett	Retrospective Honor	
1995	Joanna Russ	The Two of Them	Berkley-Putnam	Retrospective Honor	
1995	Pamela Sargent (ed.)	Women of Wonder (Series): Women of Wonder, More Women of Wonder, The New Women of Wonder	Vintage Books	Retrospective Honor	
1995	John Varley (ed.)	The Barbie Murders	Berkley Books	Retrospective Honor	
1995	Kate Wilhelm	The Clewiston Test	Farrar, Straus and Giroux	Retrospective Honor	
1995	Monique Wittig	Les Guérillères	Peter Owen Publishers	Retrospective Honor	
1995	Pamela Zoline	The Heat Death of the Universe	Harcourt Brace	Retrospective Honor	
1996	Ursula K. Le Guin	"Mountain Ways" in Asimov's Science Fiction August 1996		Winner	
1996	Mary Doria Russell	The Sparrow	Random House	Winner	
1996	Fred Chappell	"The Silent Woman" in Farewell, I'm Bound to Leave You	St. Martin's Press	Honor	
1996	Suzy McKee Charnas	"Beauty and the Opera, or The Phantom Beast" in Asimov's Science Fiction March 1996	Dell Magazines	Honor	
1996	L. Timmel Duchamp	"Welcome, Kid, to the Real World" in Tales of the Unanticipated Spring/Summer/Fall 1996	Minnesota Science Fiction Society	Honor	
1996	Alasdair Gray	A History Maker	Canongate Books	Honor	
1996	Jonathan Lethem	"Five Fucks" in The Wall of the Sky, the Wall of the Eye	Harcourt Brace	Honor	
1996	Pat Murphy	Nadya	Tor	Honor	
1996	Rachel Pollack	Godmother Night	St. Martin's Press	Honor	
1996	Lisa Tuttle	The Pillow Friend	White Wolf	Honor	
1996	Tess Williams	"And She Was the Word" in Eidolon: The Journal of Australian Science Fiction and Fantasy 22/23	Eidolon Publications	Honor	
1996	Sue Woolfe	Leaning Towards Infinity	Vintage Books	Honor	
1997	Candas Jane Dorsey	Black Wine	Tor	Winner	
1997	Kelly Link	"Travels with the Snow Queen" in Lady Churchill's Rosebud Wristlet Volume 1, Number 1, winter 1996-7	Small Beer Press	Winner	
1997	Storm Constantine	"The Oracle Lips" in The Fortune Teller	DAW Books	Honor	
1997	Paul Di Filippo	"Alice, Alfie, Ted and the Aliens" in i 117		Honor	
1997	Emma Donoghue	Kissing the Witch: Old Tales in New Skins	HarperCollins	Honor	
1997	L. Timmel Duchamp	"The Apprenticeship of Isabetta di Pietro Cavazzi" in Asimov's Science Fiction September 1997		Honor	
1997	Molly Gloss	The Dazzle of Day	Tor	Honor	
1997	M. John Harrison	Signs of Life	St. Martin's Press	Honor	
1997	Gwyneth Jones	"Balinese Dancer" in Asimov's Science Fiction September 1997		Honor	
1997	Ian McDonald	Sacrifice of Fools	Victor Gollancz Ltd	Honor	
1997	Vonda N. McIntyre	The Moon and the Sun	Pocket Books	Honor	
1997	Shani Mootoo	Cereus Blooms at Night	Press Gang Publishers	Honor	
1997	Salman Rushdie	"The Firebird's Nest" in The New Yorker June 23, 1997	Condé Nast	Honor	
1997	Paul Witcover	Waking Beauty	HarperPrism	Honor	
1998	Raphael Carter	"Congenital Agenesis of Gender Ideation" in Starlight 2	Tor	Winner	
1998	Eleanor Arnason	"The Gauze Banner" in More Amazing Stories	Tor	Honor	
1998	Octavia E. Butler	Parable of the Talents	Seven Stories Press	Honor	
1998	Ted Chiang	"Story of Your Life" in Starlight 2	Tor	Honor	
1998	Stella Duffy	Singling Out The Couples	Sceptre	Honor	
1998	Karen Joy Fowler	Black Glass	Henry Holt and Company	Honor	
1998	Maggie Gee	The Ice People	Richard Cohen Books	Honor	
1998	Carolyn Ives Gilman	Halfway Human	Avon Eos	Honor	
1998	Phyllis Gotlieb	Flesh and Gold	Tor	Honor	
1998	Nalo Hopkinson	Brown Girl in the Ring	Warner Aspect	Honor	
1998	Gwyneth Jones	"La Cenerentola" in Interzone 136		Honor	
1998	James Patrick Kelly	"Lovestory" in Asimov's Science Fiction June 1998		Honor	
1998	Ursula K. Le Guin	"Unchosen Love" in Amazing Stories Fall 1994	TSR	Honor	
1998	Elizabeth A. Lynn	Dragon's Winter	Ace / Berkley Books	Honor	
1998	Maureen F. McHugh	Mission Child	Avon Eos	Honor	
1998	Karl-Rene Moore	"The Hetairai Turncoat" in Wired Hard 2	Circlet Press	Honor	
1998	Rebecca Ore	"Accelerated Grimace" in Magazine of Fantasy and Science Fiction February 1998	The Magazine of Fantasy & Science Fiction	Honor	
1998	Sara Paretsky	Ghost Country	Delacorte Press	Honor	
1998	Severna Park	Hand of Prophecy	Avon Eos	Honor	
1998	Kit Reed	Weird Women, Wired Women	Wesleyan University Press	Honor	
1998	Kit Reed	"Bride of Bigfoot" in Weird Women, Wired Women	Wesleyan University Press	Honor	
1998	Robert Reed	"Whiptail" in Asimov's Science Fiction October/November 1998		Honor	
1998	Mary Rosenblum	"The Eye of God" in Asimov's Science Fiction March 1998		Honor	
1998	Joan Slonczewski	The Children Star	Tor	Honor	
1998	Martha Soukup	"The House of Expectations" in Starlight 2	Tor	Honor	
1998	Sean Stewart	Mockingbird	Ace	Honor	
1998	Sarah Zettel	Playing God	Warner Aspect	Honor	
1999	Suzy McKee Charnas	The Conqueror's Child	Tor	Winner	
1999	Judy Budnitz	If I Told You Once	Picador / St. Martin's Press	Honor	
1999	Sally Caves	"In the Second Person" in Terra Incognita #4		Honor	
1999	Graham Joyce	"Pinkland" in Crossing the Border	Indigo	Honor	
1999	Yumiko Kurahashi	The Woman with the Flying Head: And Other Stories (Japanese Woman Writers in Translation)	M. E. Sharpe	Honor	
1999	Penelope Lively	"5001 Nights" in The Five Thousands and One Nights (European Short Stories, No. 4)	Fjord Press	Honor	
1999	David E. Morse	The Iron Bridge	Harcourt Brace	Honor	
1999	Kim Stanley Robinson	"Sexual Dimorphism" in The Martians	Harper Voyager	Honor	
2000	Molly Gloss	Wild Life	Simon & Schuster	Winner	
2000	Michael Blumlein	"Fidelity: A Primer" in The Magazine of Fantasy & Science Fiction September 2000	The Magazine of Fantasy & Science Fiction	Honor	
2000	James L. Cambias	"Diagram of Rapture" in The Magazine of Fantasy & Science Fiction April 2000	The Magazine of Fantasy & Science Fiction	Honor	
2000	David Ebershoff	The Danish Girl	Viking	Honor	
2000	Mary Gentle	Ash: A Secret History	Victor Gollancz Ltd	Honor	
2000	Camille Hernandez-Ramdwar	"Soma" in Whispers from the Cotton Tree Root	Invisible Cities Press	Honor	
2000	Nalo Hopkinson (ed.)	"The Glass Bottle Trick" in Whispers from the Cotton Tree Root	Invisible Cities Press	Honor	
2000	Nalo Hopkinson	Midnight Robber	Warner Aspect	Honor	
2000	China Miéville	Perdido Street Station	Macmillan	Honor	
2000	Pamela Mordecai	"Once on the Shores of the Strem Senegambia" in Whispers from the Cotton Tree Root	Invisible Cities Press	Honor	
2000	Severna Park	The Annunciate	Eos	Honor	
2000	Tess Williams	Sea As Mirror	Harper Voyager	Honor	
2001	Hiromi Goto	The Kappa Child	Red Deer Press	Winner	
2001	Joan Givner	Half Known Lives	New Star Books	Honor	
2001	Ken MacLeod	Dark Light	Tor (US), Orbit (UK)	Honor	
2001	Hugh Nissenson	The Song of the Earth	Algonquin Books	Honor	
2001	Sheri S. Tepper	The Fresco	HarperCollins/Eos	Honor	
2002	M. John Harrison	Light	Victor Gollancz Ltd	Winner	
2002	John Kessel	"Stories for Men" in Asimov's Science Fiction October–November 2002		Winner	
2002	Eleanor Arnason	"Knapsack Poems" in Asimov's Science Fiction May 2002		Honor	
2002	Ted Chiang	"Liking What You See: A Documentary" in Stories of Your Life and Others	Tor	Honor	
2002	John Clute	Appleseed	Tor (US), Orbit (UK)	Honor	
2002	Karen Joy Fowler	"What I Didn't See" in SciFiction July 10, 2002	SciFi.com	Special Honor	
2002	Gregory Frost	"Madonna of the Maquiladora" in Asimov's Science Fiction May 2002	Asimov's Science Fiction	Honor	
2002	Shelley Jackson	The Melancholy of Anatomy	Anchor Books	Honor	
2002	Larissa Lai	Salt Fish Girl	Thomas Allen & Son Limited	Honor	
2002	Peter Straub (ed.)	Conjunctions 39: The New Wave Fabulists	Bard College	Honor	
2003	Matt Ruff	Set This House in Order: A Romance of Souls	HarperCollins	Winner	
2003	Kim Antieau	Coyote Cowgirl	Tom Doherty Associates	Honor	
2003	Kara Dalkey	"Lady of the Ice Garden" in Firebirds: An Anthology of Original Fantasy and Science Fiction	Firebird Books	Honor	
2003	Carol Emshwiller	"Boys"	SciFi.com	Honor	
2003	Richard Calder	"The Catgirl Manifesto" in Album Zutique #1	Ministry of Whimsy	Honor	
2003	Nina Kiriki Hoffman	A Fistful of Sky	Ace	Honor	
2003	Kij Johnson	Fudoki	Tor	Honor	
2003	Sandra McDonald	"The Ghost Girls of Rumney Mill" in Realms of Fantasy August 2003	Sovereign Media	Honor	
2003	Ruth Nestvold	"Looking Through Lace" in Asimov's Science Fiction September 2003		Honor	
2003	Geoff Ryman	"Birth Days" in Interzone April, 2003	Interzone	Honor	
2003	Tricia Sullivan	Maul	Orbit	Honor	
2004	Joe Haldeman	Camouflage	Ace	Winner	
2004	Johanna Sinisalo	Not Before Sundown (Ennen päivänlaskua ei voi); Published in the United States as Troll - a love story	Peter Owen Publishers	Winner	
2004	A. S. Byatt	Little Black Book of Stories	Chatto & Windus	Honor	
2004	L. Timmel Duchamp	Love's Body, Dancing in Time	Aqueduct Press	Honor	
2004	Carol Emshwiller	"All of Us Can Almost …"	SciFi.com	Honor	
2004	Nancy Farmer	The Sea of Trolls	Atheneum Books	Honor	
2004	Eileen Gunn	Stable Strategies and Others	Tachyon Publications	Honor	
2004	Gwyneth Jones	Life	Aqueduct Press	Honor	
2004	Jaye Lawrence	"Kissing Frogs" in The Magazine of Fantasy & Science Fiction May 2004	Spilogale, Inc.	Honor	
2005	Geoff Ryman	Air	St. Martin's Griffin	Winner	
2005	Aimee Bender	Willful Creatures	Doubleday	Honor	
2005	Margo Lanagan	"Wooden Bride" in Black Juice	Eos	Honor	
2005	Vonda N. McIntyre	"Little Faces"	SciFi.com	Honor	
2005	Wen Spencer	A Brother's Price	Roc Books	Honor	
2005	Wesley Stace	Misfortune	Back Bay Books	Honor	
2005	Mark W. Tiedemann	Remains	BenBella Books	Honor	
2006	Shelley Jackson	Half Life	HarperCollins	Winner	
2006	Catherynne M. Valente	The Orphan’s Tales: In the Night Garden	Spectra Books	Winner	
2006	Julie Phillips	James Tiptree, Jr.: The Double Life of Alice B. Sheldon	St. Martin's Press	Special Recognition	
2006	Andrea Hairston	Mindscape	Aqueduct Press	Honor	
2006	Betsy James	Listening at the Gate	Atheneum Books	Honor	
2006	Ellen Kushner	The Privilege of the Sword	Spectra Books	Honor	
2006	James Morrow	The Last Witchfinder	William Morrow	Honor	
2006	Karen Russell	St. Lucy's Home for Girls Raised by Wolves	Knopf	Honor	
2006	Karen Traviss	Matriarch	Eos	Honor	
2006	Mark von Schlegell	Venusia	Semiotext(e)	Honor	
2007	Sarah Hall	The Carhullan Army	Faber and Faber (UK 2007); HarperCollins (US 2008)	Winner	
2007	Kelley Eskridge	Dangerous Space	Aqueduct Press	Honor	
2007	Laurie J. Marks	Water Logic	Small Beer Press	Honor	
2007	Karen Miller	Empress of Mijak and The Riven Kingdom	HarperCollins	Honor	
2007	Nnedi Okorafor	The Shadow Speaker	Hyperion Books	Honor	
2007	Delia Sherman and Theodora Goss (eds.)	Interfictions: An Anthology of Interstitial Writing	Small Beer Press	Honor	
2007	Charles Stross	Glasshouse	Ace	Honor	
2007	Sheri S. Tepper	The Margarets	HarperCollins	Honor	
2007	Brian K. Vaughan	Y: The Last Man	Vertigo Comics	Honor	
2007	Ysabeau S. Wilce	Flora Segunda	Harcourt	Honor	
2008	Patrick Ness	The Knife of Never Letting Go	Walker & Co. (UK); Candlewick Press (US)	Winner	
2008	Nisi Shawl	Filter House	Aqueduct Press	Winner	
2008	Christopher Barzak	The Love We Share Without Knowing	Bantam Books	Honor	
2008	Jenny Davidson	The Explosionist	HarperTeen	Honor	
2008	Gregory Frost	Shadowbridge and Lord Tophet: A Shadowbridge Novel	Del Ray	Honor	
2008	Alison Goodman	The Two Pearls of Wisdom; Published in the United States as Eon: Dragoneye Reborn; Published in the United Kingdom as Eon: Rise of the Dragoneye	HarperCollins / Viking	Honor	
2008	John Kessel	"Pride and Prometheus" in The Magazine of Fantasy & Science Fiction January 2008	Spilogale, Inc.	Honor	
2008	Margo Lanagan	Tender Morsels	Knopf	Honor	
2008	Ursula K. Le Guin	Lavinia	Harcourt	Honor	
2008	John Ajvide Lindqvist	Let the Right One In (Låt den rätte komma in)	Quercus (UK)	Honor	
2008	Paul Park	A Princess of Roumania (Series): A Princess of Roumania, The Tourmaline, The White Tyger, and The Hidden World	Tor	Honor	
2008	Ekaterina Sedia	The Alchemy of Stone	Prime Books	Honor	
2008	Ali Smith	Girl Meets Boy	Canongate Books	Honor	
2008	Ysabeau S. Wilce	Flora's Dare: How a Girl of Spirit Gambles All to Expand Her Vocabulary, Confront a Bouncing Boy Terror, and Try to Save Califa from a Shaky Doom (Despite Being Confined to Her Room)	Harcourt	Honor	
2009	Greer Gilman	Cloud and Ashes: Three Winter's Tales	Small Beer Press	Winner	
2009	Fumi Yoshinaga	Ōoku: The Inner Chambers	Hakusensha (Japan); VIZ Media (English-speaking world)	Winner	
2009	L. Timmel Duchamp	The Marq'ssan Cycle	Aqueduct Press	Special Honor	
2009	Paul Haines	"Wives" in X6	Coeur de lion	Honor	
2009	Caitlín R. Kiernan	"Galapagos" in Eclipse 3	Night Shade Books	Honor	
2009	Alice Sola Kim	"Beautiful White Bodies" in Strange Horizons 07-14 July 2009	Strange Horizons	Honor	
2009	Maureen F. McHugh	"Useless Things" in Eclipse 3	Night Shade Books	Honor	
2009	Vandana Singh	Distances	Aqueduct Press	Honor	
2009	Jo Walton	Lifelode	NESFA Press	Honor	
2010	Dubravka Ugresic	Baba Yaga Laid an Egg	Canongate Books	Winner	
2010	Amanda Downum	The Bone Palace	Orbit	Honor	
2010	N. K. Jemisin	The Hundred Thousand Kingdoms	Orbit	Honor	
2010	Sandra McDonald	"Diana Comet and the Disappearing Lover"	Strange Horizons	Honor	
2010	Sandra McDonald	"Drag Queen Astronaut" in Crossed Genres issue 24	Crossed Genres	Honor	
2010	Helen Merrick	The Secret Feminist Cabal	Aqueduct Press	Honor	
2010	Nnedi Okorafor	Who Fears Death	DAW Books	Honor	
2010	Kari Sperring	Living with Ghosts	DAW Books	Honor	
2010	Jillian Weise	The Colony	Soft Skull Press	Honor	
2011	Andrea Hairston	Redwood and Wildfire	Aqueduct Press	Winner	
2011	Libba Bray	Beauty Queens	Scholastic Press	Honor	
2011	L. Timmel Duchamp	"The Nones of Quintilus" in Never at Home	Aqueduct Press	Honor	
2011	Kameron Hurley	God's War	Night Shade Books	Honor	
2011	Gwyneth Jones	The Universe of Things	Aqueduct Press	Honor	
2011	Alice Sola Kim	"The Other Graces" in Asimov's Science Fiction July 2010	Dell Magazines	Honor	
2011	Sandra McDonald	"Seven Sexy Cowboy Robots" in Strange Horizons, 2010.10.04	Strange Horizons	Honor	
2011	Maureen F. McHugh	"After the Apocalypse" in After the Apocalypse	Small Beer Press	Honor	
2011	Delia Sherman	The Freedom Maze	Big Mouth House	Honor	
2011	Kim Westwood	The Courier's New Bicycle	Harper Voyager	Honor	
2012	Caitlín R. Kiernan	The Drowning Girl	Roc Books	Winner	
2012	Kiini Ibura Salaam	Ancient, Ancient	Aqueduct Press	Winner	
2012	Elizabeth Bear	Range of Ghosts	Tor	Honor	
2012	Roz Kaveney	Rituals	Plus One Press	Honor	
2012	M. J. Locke	Up Against it	Tor	Honor	
2012	Kim Stanley Robinson	2312	Orbit	Honor	
2012	Karin Tidbeck	Jagannath	Cheeky Frawg Books	Honor	
2012	Ankaret Wells	Firebrand	Epicon Press	Honor	
2012	Lesley Wheeler	The Receptionist	Aqueduct Press	Honor	
2013	N. A. Sulway	Rupetta	Tartarus Press	Winner	
2013	Eleanor Arnason	Big Mama Stories	Aqueduct Press	Honor	
2013	Aliette de Bodard	"Heaven Under Earth" in Electric Velocipede #24	Electric Velocipede	Honor	
2013	Nicola Griffith	Hild	Farrar, Straus and Giroux	Honor	
2013	Alaya Dawn Johnson	The Summer Prince	Arthur A. Levine Books	Honor	
2013	Ann Leckie	Ancillary Justice	Orbit	Honor	
2013	Bennett Madison	September Girls	HarperTeen	Honor	
2013	Sarah McCarry	All Our Pretty Songs	St. Martin's Press	Honor	
2013	Janelle Monáe	The Electric Lady	Bad Boy Records	Honor	
2013	Helene Wecker	The Golem and the Jinni	HarperCollins	Honor	
2013	S. M. Wheeler	Sea Change	Tor	Honor	
2014	Monica Byrne	The Girl in the Road	Penguin Random House	Winner	
2014	Jo Walton	My Real Children	Tor	Winner	
2014	Jennifer Marie Brissett	Elysium	Aqueduct Press	Honor	
2014	Seth Chambers	"In Her Eyes" in The Magazine of Fantasy & Science Fiction January/February 2014	The Magazine of Fantasy & Science Fiction	Honor	
2014	Kim Curran	"A Woman Out of Time" in Irregularity	Jurassic London	Honor	
2014	Emmi Itäranta	Memory of Water	Harper Voyager	Honor	
2014	Jacqueline Koyanagi	Ascension	Masque Books	Honor	
2014	Alisa Krasnostein & Julia Rios (eds)	Kaleidoscope	Twelfth Planet Press	Honor	
2014	Pat MacEwen	"The Lightness of the Movement" in The Magazine of Fantasy & Science Fiction March/April 2014	The Magazine of Fantasy & Science Fiction	Honor	
2014	Nnedi Okorafor	Lagoon	Hodder & Stoughton	Honor	
2014	Nghi Vo	"Neither Witch nor Fairy" in Long Hidden: Speculative Fiction from the Margins of History	Crossed Genres	Honor	
2014	Aliya Whiteley	The Beauty	Unsung Stories	Honor	
2015	Eugene Fischer	"The New Mother" in Asimov's Science Fiction Magazine April/May 2015	Dell Magazines	Winner	
2015	Pat Schmatz	Lizard Radio	Candlewick Press	Winner	
2015	Susan Jane Bigelow	"Sarah's Child" in Strange Horizons 19 May 2014	Strange Horizons	Honor	
2015	Nino Cipri	"The Shape of My Name" on Tor.com	Tor	Honor	
2015	Carola Dibbell	The Only Ones	Two Dollar Radio	Honor	
2015	Matt Fraction and Christian Ward	Off to Far Ithicaa (ODY-C Vol. 1)	Image Comics	Honor	
2015	Alex Marshall	A Crown for Cold Silver	Orbit	Honor	
2015	Seanan McGuire	"Each to Each" in Lightspeed: Women Destroy Science Fiction! Special Issue Issue 49, June 2014	Lightspeed	Honor	
2015	A. Merc Rustad	"How to Become a Robot in 12 Easy Steps" in scigentasy.com Issue 4	Scigentasy	Honor	
2015	Ian Sales	All that Outer Space Allows	Whippleshield Books	Honor	
2015	Taneka Stotts and Sfe Monster (eds.)	beyond: the queer sci-fi and fantasy comic anthology	beyond	Honor	
2015	Rebecca Sugar (creator, executive producer)	Steven Universe	Cartoon Network Studios/Cartoon Network	Honor	
2015	Catherynne M. Valente	Radiance	Tor	Honor	
2016	Anna-Marie McLemore	When the Moon Was Ours	Thomas Dunne Books / St. Martin's Griffin	Winner	
2016	Eleanor Arnason	Hwarhath Stories: Transgressive Tales by Aliens	Aqueduct Press	Honor	
2016	Mishell Baker	Borderline	Saga Press	Honor	
2016	Nino Cipri	"Opals and Clay"	PodCastle	Honor	
2016	Andrea Hairston	Will Do Magic for Small Change	Aqueduct Press	Honor	
2016	Rachael K. Jones	"The Night Bazaar for Women Becoming Reptiles" in Beneath Ceaseless Skies 203	Beneath Ceaseless Skies	Honor	
2016	Seanan McGuire	Every Heart a Doorway	Tor	Honor	
2016	Ada Palmer	Too Like the Lightning	Tor	Honor	
2016	Nisi Shawl	Everfair	Tor	Honor	
2016	Johanna Sinisalo	The Core of the Sun (Auringon ydin)	Grove Press / Black Cat	Honor	
2017	Virginia Bergin	Who Runs the World?	Macmillan	Winner	
2017	Charlie Jane Anders	"Don't Press Charges and I Won't Sue"	Boston Review	Honor	
2017	April Daniels	Dreadnought	Diversion Books	Honor	
2017	April Daniels	Sovereign	Diversion Books	Honor	
2017	Indra Das	The Devourers	Del Ray	Honor	
2017	Maggie Shen King	An Excess Male	Harper Voyager	Honor	
2017	Carmen Maria Machado	Her Body and Other Parties	Graywolf Press	Honor	
2017	Rivers Solomon	An Unkindness of Ghosts	Akashic Books	Honor	
2017	JY Yang	The Black Tides of Heaven	Tor	Honor	
2017	JY Yang	The Red Threads of Fortune	Tor	Honor	
2018	Gabriela Damián Miravete	"They Will Dream in the Garden"	Latin American Literature Today	Winner	
2018	A. C. Buchanan, ed.	Capricious Magazine: The Gender Diverse Pronouns Issue	Capricious SF	Honor	
2018	Amber Dawn	Sodom Road Exit	Arsenal Pulp Press	Honor	
2018	L. Timmel Duchamp	Chercher la Femme	Aqueduct Press	Honor	
2018	Meg Elison	"Big Girl"	The Magazine of Fantasy & Science Fiction	Honor	
2018	Joamette Gil	Power & Magic: The Queer Witch Comics Anthology	P&M	Honor	
2018	Keffy R. M. Kehrli	GlitterShip Year Two	Self-published	Honor	
2018	Larissa Lai	The Tiger Flu	Arsenal Pulp Press	Honor	
2018	Janelle Monáe (featured artist, producer/executive producer, songwriter)	Dirty Computer	Wandaland Records / Bad Boy Records / Atlantic Records	Honor	
2018	A. E. Prevost	"Sandals Full of Rainwater"	Capricious SF	Honor	
2018	Maria Turtschaninoff, translated by A. A. Prime	Maresi: The Red Abbey Chronicles	Amulet Books	Honor	
2018	D. Warrick	"Me, Waiting for Me, Hoping for Something More"	Shimmer Magazine	Honor	
2019	Akwaeke Emezi	Freshwater	Grove Press	Winner	
2019	Kylie Ariel Bemis	"Dreamborn"	Bedside Press	Honor	
2019	Meg Elison	The Book of Flora	47North Press	Honor	
2019	Akwaeke Emezi	Pet	Make Me a World Press	Honor	
2019	Kameron Hurley	Meet Me in the Future	Tachyon Publications	Honor	
2019	Innocent Chizaram Ilo	Of Warps and Wefts	Strange Horizons	Honor	
2019	Mary Robinette Kowal	The Calculating Stars	Tor Books	Honor	
2019	Laurie J. Marks	Elemental Logic series	Small Beer Press	Honor	
2019	Yukiko Motoya	The Lonesome Bodybuilder	Soft Skull Press	Honor	
2019	Rivers Solomon	The Deep	Gallery / Saga Press	Honor	
2020	Oghenechovwe Donald Ekpeki	Ife-Iyoku, the Tale of Imadeyunuagbon	Aurelia Leo	Winner	
2020	Anya Johanna DeNiro	City of a Thousand Feelings	Aqueduct Press	Honor	
2020	Isabel Fall	Helicopter Story	Clarkesworld	Honor	
2020	Amy Griswold	Custom Options Available	Fireside Magazine	Honor	
2020	Sim Kern	Depart, Depart!	Stelliform Press	Honor	
2020	R. B. Lemberg	The Four Profound Weaves	Tachyon Publications	Honor	
2020	Maria Romasco Moore	The Moon Room	Kaleidotrope	Honor	
2020	Chana Porter	The Seep	Soho Press	Honor	
2020	Maggie Tokuda-Hall	The Mermaid, the Witch, and the Sea	Candlewick Press	Honor	
2021	Ryka Aoki	Light From Uncommon Stars	Tor Books	Winner	
2021	Rivers Solomon	Sorrowland	MCD Books	Winner	
2021	Callum Angus	A Natural History of Transition	Metonymy Press	Honor	
2021	Eugen Bacon	Danged Black Thing	Transit Lounge	Honor	
2021	Monica Byrne	The Actual Star	Harper Voyager	Honor	
2021	K-Ming Chang	Bestiary	One World	Honor	
2021	Anna-Marie McLemore	Dark and Deepest Red	Feiwel & Friends	Honor	
2021	Claire Oshetsky	Chouette	Ecco Press	Honor	
2021	Shelley Parker-Chan	She Who Became the Sun	Tor Books	Honor	
2021	Benjamin Rosenbaum	The Unraveling	Erewhon Books	Honor	
2021	Aiden Thomas	Cemetery Boys	Swoon Reads	Honor	
2022	Suspended				
2023	Suspended				
2024	Emet North	In Universes	HarperCollins	Winner	
2024	P. C. Verrone	Kiss of Life	FIYAH Literary Magazine	Winner	
2024	Vajra Chandrasekera	Rakesfall	Macmillan Publishers	Winner	
2024	Dolki Min	Walking Practice	HarperCollins	Winner	
2024	L. Nabang	The Flame in You	Inner Worlds	Honor List	
2024	Kailee Pedersen	Sacrificial Animals	Macmillan Publishers	Honor List	
2024	Margaret Killjoy	The Sapling Cage	The Feminist Press	Honor List	
2024	Everdeen Mason	Scarlett	Lightspeed Magazine	Honor List	
2024	Courtney Pauroso	Vanessa 5000	Dropout	Honor List	
2025	Silvia Park	Luminous	Simon & Schuster	Winner	
2025	Syr Hayati Beker	What a Fish Looks Like	Stelliform	Honor List	
2025	Isaac R. Fellman	Notes from a Regicide	Tor Books	Honor List	
2025	K. O'Neill	A Song for You and I	Random House Graphic	Honor List	
2025	Jessy Randall, with Kristin DiVona (illus.)	The Path of Most Resistance: Poems on Women in Science	Gold SF	Honor List	
2025	Roque Raquel Salas Rivera	Algarabía	Graywolf	Honor List	
