= Fortunate Fall =

Fortunate Fall may refer to:

- Fortunate Fall (album), 2013 album by Audrey Assad
- Felix culpa, the concept of the Fall of Man being fortuitous
- The Fortunate Fall (novel), 1996 novel by Cameron Reed
- Fortunate Fall (band), an anarcho-metal band
