= Elemental Logic =

Fantasy series by Laurie J. Marks

- Author: Laurie J. Marks
- Country: United States
- Language: English
- Genre: Fantasy
- Publisher: Tor Books; Small Beer Press
- Published: 2002–2019
- Media type: Print, e-book
- No. of books: 4
- Website: Elemental Magics on LaurieJMarks.com

Elemental Logic is a fantasy novel series by American writer Laurie J. Marks, set in the fictional world of Shaftal. Blending elemental magic, political intrigue, and rich character dynamics, the series spans four novels published between 2002 and 2019. The series explores themes of elemental magic, colonialism, resistance, cultural identity, reconciliation, and ethical governance. It is noted for its egalitarian social structures, fluid gender roles, feminist ethos, and normalization of queer and polyamorous relationships. The Elemental Logic series was on the Otherwise Award Honor List in 2019.

== Publication history ==
- Fire logic. New York: Tor Books. 2002. ISBN 978-0-312-87887-0.
- Earth Logic. New York: Tor Books. 2004. ISBN 978-0-7653-0952-5.
- Water Logic. New York: Small Beer Press. 2007. ISBN 978-1-931520-23-2.
- Air Logic. Easthampton: Small Beer Press. 2019. ISBN 978-1-61873-160-9.

== Setting and background ==
The series takes place in a secondary, non-technological world. It's set in the once peaceful, pastoral land of Shaftal, which was invaded by the Sainnites around 35 years before the events of the first novel. The Sainnites fear Shaftali elementals, and have killed many gifted individuals in an attempt to wipe out the threat of elemental logic. This suspicion, in addition to the aggression of conquest, mean that Sainnites and Shaftali do not mix any more than needed for governance and trade, and for the most part do not speak each other's language. Because of the continuous violence of the Sainnites—who are militarily trained but at a numeric disadvantage to the agrarian Shaftali—many Shaftali have abandoned their ways of peace, and there is a burgeoning insurgent movement against their rule during the time the books take place.

=== The magic system ===
Each element in the magic system—air, earth, fire, and water—is associated with particular abilities and personality traits. Logic talent is innate, varying in strength from person to person. Not all Shaftali people are elementals; those with a strong affinity to an element are bloods (such as fire bloods), and the most powerful are termed witches (say, air witches). Most people have an affinity to only one element, but sometimes more than one can manifest. The logic of all four elements is necessary for balance, but some logics have affinity with each other, while others are completely antithetical: Fire bloods and air bloods tend to not get along, to the point of having trouble being in the same room; and earth bloods suffer physically and mentally if they try to go in or on bodies of water.

- Fire: Possibilities. Associated with passion, courage, and risktaking, fire bloods work through intuition, and often are prescient. For them, there is no difference between metaphor and reality. The fire bloods are both scholars and the military leaders of Shaftal.
- Earth: Realities. Associated with compassion and stability, earth bloods are often healers, farmers, and builders. They can impact the earth and what is on it, such as making the soil more fertile or mending physical structures. They are doers rather than thinkers, and help maintain stability within communities.
- Water: Holistic. Associated with movement, rhythm, and flow. In the series, the water witch can manipulate time.
- Air: Analytical. Associated with perception, thought, and motivation. Air bloods are concerned with order, systems, and judgment, and seemingly, do not deal well with emotion. Air witches can control a person's thoughts, actions, and memories. In the final book, Air Logic, it is implied that air logic is a stand-in for autism.

=== Important roles ===
The G’deon is the head of government and leader of Shaftal. The role is always held by an earth witch, who becomes the strongest elemental in Shaftal, possessing all the power of the land.

Truthkens are air bloods who are the lawgivers of Shaftal. They determine who is to stand trial and, if convicted, what the punishment should be.

Paladins are the philosopher warriors of Shaftal. Often fire bloods, paladins maintain a military role, but do it out of a deep commitment to ethics and knowledge. They always carry paper, pen, and ink, because they prioritize communication over fighting. A key tenet of their ideology is: "Evil may enter the world, but it will not enter through me."

== Books ==
=== Fire Logic (2002) ===
Fire Logic was published 1 June 2001, by Tor Books. It was awarded the 2003 Gaylactic Spectrum Award and the Romantic Times nominated the book for the best fantasy novel of 2002.

==== Plot ====
The land of Shaftal is invaded by the militaristic Sainnites, who destroy the House of Lilterwess, the nation's cultural and political center. In the attack, the reigning G’deon, Harald, is killed without naming a successor. Zanja na’Tarwein, a fireblood and warrior-diplomat, returns to her Ashawala’i people after witnessing the destruction, but the Sainnites soon reach the northern borderlands and massacre her tribe. Left the sole survivor, Zanja is captured, tortured, and left imprisoned and with a broken back.

Zanja's path crosses with Karis, a half-Sainnite earth witch and metalsmith of extraordinary power, who has spent years in a drug stupor while working in a brothel for Sainnite soldiers. Despite her dependence on smoke, Karis rescues Zanja and heals her. Zanja is later key to healing Karis of her addiction to the smoke drug. The two form a deep and loving bond, and eventually become life partners.

In the leadership gap, Shaftal's resistance is taken up by Mabin, who organizes the Paladins into a guerrilla force. Among her allies are Emil Paladin, a scholar-warrior and Norina Truthken, an air blood who uses her gift to test oaths and uncover lies. Karis performs a rare and powerful act of logic that only G'deons are able to do, invested as they are with the power of Shaftal, making it clear that she is now the G'deon of Shaftal. Mabin is unhappy but accepting; Norina vows to protect her, and as uneasy as she is with Zanja, the two women, Emil, and J'han become more than just the core of the restoration of Shaftal—with the birth of Norina and J'han's daughter Leeba—they become a family.

After some initial successes, the resistance suffers a series of defeats due to the visions of Medric, a fire blood seer guiding the Sainnites, and the war leaves Shaftal on the brink of famine and collapse. Frustrated by the attempts to regain Shaftal with minimal loss of life, as Karis is firm about, a guerrilla commander named Willis defects with some supporters, and sets himself up as militant opposition leader and claimant of the position of G'deon. Medric makes a move in the other direction, and escapes the Sainnite army to join the Shaftali crew, almost immediately pairing with Emil.

Fire Logic deals with possibilities: Envisioning a different future even in the face of the worst kinds of devastation and doing the work to bring it on.

=== Earth Logic (2004) ===
Earth Logic was published in 2004, by Tor Books. It was awarded the 2005 Gaylactic Spectrum Award.

==== Plot ====
Karis is now announced as the leader of Shaftal, but the question remains whether Shaftal is ready for her leadership. Earth Logic addresses the challenges of ending decades-long conflict without annihilating either side. Karis insists that domination must be exchanged for community and domesticity, which in turn will develop into shared identity and purpose. But the path to goal remains rocky; each character has their own particular emotional trauma to work out, and make things more difficult, Karis is loath to take on the public aspects of leadership, preferring to remain in obscurity with her developing family of elementals, which is joined by Garland, a deserter from the Sainnite army and a gifted cook. Together they traverse the land to draw Shaftali to the cause of the rebirth of Shaftal. Meanwhile, the Sainnites have no intention of making peace, and many Shaftali mistrust Karis' mixed heritage and philosophy of peacemaking.

After Willis attacks a Sainnite garrison, a deadly plague erupts, killing indiscriminately. The Sainnites are unable to handle the combination of the attacks, plague, and resistance. Clement, a rising officer in the Sainnite army, slowly begins to develop a relationship with Karis' gang, mainly through Zanja, who inexplicably, is required to be dead according to prophecy.

Earth Logic deals with realities: Addressing the challenges of rebuilding and community organizing; approached with compassion, to bring about connection and balance.

=== Water Logic (2007) ===
Water Logic was published in 2007, by Small Beer Press. It was on the Otherwise Award Honor List in 2007.

==== Plot ====
The war is now over. Karis sets up a government center in Watfield, and invites councilors from across Shaftal to join her in Travesty, the house she's set up for both family and administration. One councilor is Seth, an earth blood and cow doctor, who shares an attraction with General Clement. Clement had met Seth at her country home, while on campaign, and declined an invitation to join her family. Families in Shaftal are loose but committed groups of individuals, mostly related by blood but also including mated pairs or anyone who finds themselves in sync with the family. Clement, back in Watfield, has adopted a baby, which is the only way Sainnites have been able to build families: Taking in children who are the progeny of Sainnite soldiers.

Clement's challenge is converting the Sainnites, who only know military force, into civilians. Karis' crew must deal with the insurgents, who call themselves the Death-and-Life company. Their leader Willis has been killed by Saugus, an air witch who takes his place, and deploys his devotees (many only such through mental manipulation) throughout Shaftal to agitate against Karis and peace with Sainnites.

Zanja travels back in time, courtesy of a water witch, the leader of the secluded water folk. There, she searches for a book of glyphs that is the key to all the fire blood prescience and is necessary for the crew's success, but she is wary of unintended consequences. When she finds it, she is shocked to discover that the original Shaftali were actually Sainnites who came to the land some centuries before. Saugus, now the cultish leader of a network of fanatical followers whom he controls through air logic, launches an unsuccessful attempt to assassinate Karis, but kills several people of the household.

Water Logic is holistic, dealing with the metaphysical as well as the mundane: Zanja is flung to the far past and must contend with how her actions there will affect the future, or her normal present, in which Karis and her family, Clement and her army, and the people of Shaftal are struggling with how to engage in ethical reconstruction.

=== Air Logic (2019) ===
Air Logic was published 4 June 2019, by Small Beer Press.

==== Plot ====
Several months after the events of Water Logic, the threat of the insurgents is increasing, as Saugus can achieve the domination of Shaftal he seeks only through Karis' death.

In Travesty, Norina has gathered air-talented children to train as the next generation of the Order of Truthkens. When most of the household travels to the trading town of Hannishport, the children remain to continue studying with J’han—except for Maxew, who accompanies Norina. In Hannishport, Chaen, an itinerant sign-painter who is half air and half fire blood, attempts another assassination of Karis. Chaen lost all her family except for a son to the Sainnites, and joined Death-and-Life to seek vengeance. Unknown to her, her son Maxew, who is an untrained air witch, is also present, working as a double agent within the insurgents and plotting to betray Karis. When Emil arrests Chaen, Maxew erases her memories of him to protect his cover.

Maxew joins forces with Tashar, a disaffected scion of a wealthy family who has secretly constructed an airship. With Tashar's help, Maxew abducts Emil, and the three travel by air toward Saugus. Zanja sets out in pursuit, while the rest of Karis's people and Clement's forces follow, all unaware of the airship. Each group faces its own challenges—and personal development—as the Sainnites act for the first time in open support of Shaftal.

The air children, meanwhile, are intently examining the behavior of the non-air bloods around them, seeking to understand forms of human interaction beyond rule-based judgment. Through this attention they discover that Saugus has been living among them, hiding through mind control. On the verge of being found out, he's murdered J'han and abducted Leeba. The air children set out to find Norina and inform her.

Chaen, after a struggle and incremental growth with Karis' crew, has her memories restored. She is torn between loyalty to her son and recognition of Karis's authority as Shaftal, eventually forced to confront the truth about both. For Maxew, however, Chaen represents a dangerous liability. Cold and pragmatic, he resolves to eliminate his mother if necessary.

As the final confrontation nears, all of Shaftal's elemental forces—earth, air, fire, and water—play a role, whether in better understanding the past, coming together in all the post-war disarray and mistrust, or establishing the foundations of a peaceful and plentiful future for Shaftal.

Air Logic is analytical: Dealing with morals and structure. The morals are not meant to be absolute, and are differentiated from ethics (as represented by fire logic). The air children, applying reason to systemic rules, believe they are always correct, but Norina teaches them that this very conviction is a legitimation of abuse of power, and that checks are needed to avoid using force to apply "rightness". Norina herself, in dealing with Chaen's cultish convictions, converses with her using reason to convince, even though Chaen has been convicted and Norina could choose to use her power.

== Characters ==
Members of the G'deon household:

- Zanja Na'Tarwein: Fire blood and boundaries crosser. The speaker of the Ashawala'i, a sort of ambassador to Shaftal. A skilled fighter and the last survivor of her people. Wife of Karis, parent of Leeba.
- Karis: An earth witch, and the G'deon of Shaftal. Half Sainnite, she was addicted to the smoke drug and was forced to work in a bordello to survive. Karis is committed to ending the Sainnite conquest of Shaftal by creating a common future for both peoples. Wife of Zanja, parent of Leeba.
- Emil: Fire blood and presciant. A scholar and a Paladin, he is an officer in the service of Shaftal who becomes a reluctant leader of the rebellion. Partner of Medric, parent of Leeba.
- Medric: Fire blood. A Sainnite seer who becomes one of the household's most important, and complicated, allies. His precognition is very powerful but often unclear, and Medric often seems to live in a fog. Partner of Emil.
- Norina: Air witch, and the Truthken of Shaftal. Married to J'han, and mother of Leeba.
- J'han: Earth blood and healer. Partner of Norina, and father of Leeba.
- Leeba: Child of the household, born to Norina and J'han.
- Garland: A Sainnite deserter and cook who becomes part of the household and though is mainly the one who maintains the household domestically, eventually also takes on a leadership role.

Additional key characters:

- Clement: A Sainnite general who takes on the difficult role of ending the occupation of Shaftal and making her people Shaftalese. Mother of Gabian and partner of Seth.
- Seth: An earth blood and cow doctor, who becomes a councilor in the new government of Shaftal. Partner of Clement.
- The Water Witch: In the third and fourth books of the series, the powerful Water Witch, leader of her people. Though she generally wants nothing to do with Shaftal, she gets involved so she can change the past and save her people from historic tragedy.
- Chaen: An itinerant sign-painter. Her entire family was killed by the Sainnites, except for her son Maxew, an untrained air witch. At his bidding, she joins the Death-and-Life company to seek vengeance, and participates in two attempts on Karis' life.
- Maxew: A cruel and selfish young man who uses his air talent to control and torture others in service of Saugus.
- Saugus (AKA Bran): Air witch. Leader of the Death-and-Life company, seeks to rule Shaftal and kill all the Sainnites. He manipulates the minds of the residents of Travesty, murders J'han and kidnaps Leeba.

== Awards and honors ==
In 2019, the Elemental Logic series was nominated for the Otherwise Award.

Awards for Elemental Logic
Book	Year	Award	Result	Ref.
Fire Logic	2002	Romantic Times Best Fantasy Novel	Nominee	
Fire Logic	2003	Gaylactic Spectrum Award for Best Novel	Winner	
Earth Logic	2005	Gaylactic Spectrum Award for Best Novel	Winner	
Water Logic	2007	Otherwise Award	Nominee	
The Elemental Logic Series	2019	Otherwise Award	Nominee	
