= The Sky So Big and Black =

2002 novel by John Barnes

- Author: John Barnes
- Cover artist: Vince Natale
- Language: English
- Series: Century Next Door
- Release number: 4
- Genre: Science fiction
- Publisher: Tor Books
- Publication date: August 3, 2002
- Publication place: United States
- Media type: Print
- Pages: 315
- ISBN: 0765303035
- OCLC: 49225709
- Preceded by: Candle

The Sky So Big and Black is a science fiction novel by John Barnes that was published in 2002. The title itself refers to the clear sky as seen from the surface of Mars, to the nearness of the Martian horizon because Mars is a much smaller planet, and to the abrupt absence/darkness of many overhead satellites that occurs at a key point in the story. The whole story takes place on Mars, which was first settled around 2030 in the timeframe of this series (see Barnes's novels Orbital Resonance and Kaleidoscope Century). This novel takes place in (the mid-to-late 2090s) when humans have settled en masse, in at least three large waves of settlement.

== Plot summary ==
This story alternates between the point of view of Terpsichore Melpomene Murray ("Teri"), an ecoprospector who's approaching adulthood on Mars and seeks to follow in her father's footsteps, and the unnamed psychiatrist who is listening to her story. Several decades earlier, refugees from Earth fled to join a pre-existing human colony on Mars to escape the domination of One True, a massively parallel/cellular automata program that runs on the interconnected brains of most of the human beings on Earth; the program in the individual human brain is called Resuna, probably a contraction from the Latin for One Thing. If a human mind has a copy of Resuna, it may remain dormant until a human speaks the trigger phrase let overwrite, let override.

The first half of the novel is mostly backstory in Teri's voice, leading up to the day when she passed her test for "full adulthood", a legal status that can apparently be reached at any age by passing an educational and psychiatric exam, which gives her the right to marry, hold property, vote, and so forth. Teri hopes to be an ecospector (eco-prospector) like her father Telemachus, living on the surface in a pressure suit most of the time; but because in the last generation the colonists decided to forgo terraforming Mars to suit human life and instead adapt humans to suit the Martian environment, the future of ecospecting doesn't look good to Telemachus; he thinks the future of Mars is with the "Nations" of Mars-formed humans. It's estimated that modifying people can be done in just two to three generations, whereas terraforming Mars might take thousands of years. Thus he wants her to get an advanced degree and go into some always-needed occupation like science or medicine.

When they strike a "scorehole", a very large deposit of methane and water, their fortune seems assured, and Teri expects to marry the boy she has been courting; when it turns out he has married someone else, she grumpily agrees to one more year of school at least, and she and Telemachus take on the job of shepherding a group of younger children to the school at Red Sands City. While the party are in the roundings (the frontier, bush, or outback—possibly from "surroundings" or "roundabouts"?) a major solar flare occurs, and because Mars' thin atmosphere and weak magnetic field provide less protection against high-energy particles than on Earth, this event overloads many electronics systems on Mars, as well as damaging the "exosuit" (space suit) systems of many people who are outdoors and otherwise unprotected, so that several members of the party are killed, including Telemachus. Furthermore, the GPS-like navigation system Teri has used all her life is permanently down.

Teri and Alik, a boy in the party, re-invent celestial navigation and reach the nearest railhead, where there is a working phone, only to find that the disaster is planetwide and help will not be coming soon. Worse yet, a group of Marsform humans are stranded farther up the track and in danger of starving due to their ultrafast metabolisms. Despite her bigotry against the Nations, Teri tries to take food to them in a backpack, but collapses and breaks her leg. A mysterious voice on her suit radio soothes and comforts her, takes over her body, and causes her to wreck her body getting food to the Marsforms; she has been taken over by Resuna. We now learn why the psychiatrist himself has been listening to her story; they are recording it so she can have some idea of what happened in the big gaps he is going to create in her memory while erasing Resuna. He himself has had this process twice.

Further, we learn that this is all information from the past, that in fact he has been re-infected with Resuna, and so has Teri, and that they will both lose all memory of each other and of the many events, including much of her last memories of her father. So although they have been close friends, in the last chapter they are re-introduced to each other for the first time. The novel ends with their working as ecospecting partners, as Mars rebuilds.

== Reception ==
Publishers Weekly recommended the novel to "anyone interested in vivid near-future worlds, engaging characters and moral questions with no simple answers." Kirkus Reviews stated: "Thoughtful and absorbing, to begin with; and just when you feel you've had enough of Teri and her problems, the Sunburst propels the story into entirely different dimensions. A winner." Don D'Ammassa of the Science Fiction Chronicle wrote that it "is one of a growing number of recent novels to deal realistically with the colonization of that planet, and it's one of the better ones."
