= Redwood and Wildfire =

Book by Andrea Hairston

- Cover art for Redwood and Wildfire by Nic Ularu
- Author: Andrea Hairston
- Published: 2011 (Aqueduct Press)
- Pages: 429
- ISBN: 9781933500522
- OCLC: 698360179

Redwood and Wildfire is Andrea Hairston's second novel. It centers on the main characters Redwood and Aidan and their travel from Georgia to Chicago at the turn of the 20th century. It was published in 2011 by Aqueduct Press.

== Awards ==
- 2011 James Tiptree, Jr. Award
- 2011 Carl Brandon Society Award
