= Orbital Resonance (novel) =

1991 novel by John Barnes

- Cover of first edition (hardcover)
- Author: John Barnes
- Cover artist: Bob Eggleton
- Language: English
- Series: Century Next Door
- Genre: Science fiction novel
- Publisher: Tor Books
- Publication date: 1991
- Publication place: United States
- Media type: Print (hardback & paperback)
- Pages: 214
- ISBN: 0-312-85206-1
- OCLC: 23975965
- LC Class: PS3552.A677 O73 1991
- Followed by: Kaleidoscope Century

Orbital Resonance is a science fiction novel by John Barnes. It is the first of four books comprising the Century Next Door series, followed by Kaleidoscope Century, Candle, and The Sky So Big and Black.

Orbital Resonance was nominated for the James Tiptree Jr. Award (now Otherwise Award) in 1991 and the Nebula Award for Best Novel in 1992.

== Critical reaction ==
Writer Jo Walton declared: "This may be Barnes’s best book. (Or that may be A Million Open Doors.) It’s a book almost everyone who likes SF will enjoy, and if it gives you a lot to think about as well, then that’s all to the good."
