= Alice Sola Kim =

American science fiction writer

- Education: Stanford University (BA); Washington University in St. Louis (MFA)
- Writing career
- Genre: Science fiction
- Notable awards: Whiting Award (2016)

Alice Sola Kim is an American science fiction writer living in Brooklyn, New York. She was the recipient of a 2016 Whiting Award.

== Early life and education ==
Kim was raised in Seattle, Washington. She was a member of the 2004 Clarion West Writers Workshop, where she studied under author Kelly Link. Kim received a B.A. from Stanford University in 2006 and an M.F.A. from the Creative Writing Program at Washington University in St. Louis in 2011.

== Career ==
Her writing has appeared in McSweeney's Quarterly, The Magazine of Fantasy & Science Fiction, Tin House, Lenny Letter, Asimov's Science Fiction, BuzzFeed, Lightspeed Magazine, and Strange Horizons. Kim's works include short stories like “We Love Deena" and "Hwang's Billion Brilliant Daughters.”

In 2018, her horror short story, "Mothers, Lock Up Your Daughters Because They Are Terrifying" was acquired by 2000 Fox and 21 Laps, the producers of the Netflix original series Stranger Things, with Kim executive producing.

Kim teaches speculative fiction in the MFA Writing program at Sarah Lawrence College and the MA Writing program at Johns Hopkins University.

== Awards and honors ==
In 2016, Kim was selected as one of ten recipients of the annual Whiting Awards. Kim has received grants and scholarships from the MacDowell Colony, Bread Loaf Writers’ Conference, and the Elizabeth George Foundation. Vice described Kim as part of a "Subversive New Generation of Asian American Writers."

Kim's story "Beautiful White Bodies" made the "Honor list" for the 2009 James Tiptree Jr. Award. Her story "The Other Graces" made the "Honor list" for the 2011 James Tiptree Jr. Award.

== Bibliography ==
=== Short fiction ===
- "The Night and Day War", 2007
- "We Love Deena", 2008
- "Beautiful White Bodies", 2009
- "The Other Graces", 2010
- "Hwang's Billion Brilliant Daughters", 2010
- "Successor, Usurper, Replacement", 2016
- "One Hour, Every Seven Years", 2017
- "Mothers, Lock Up Your Daughters Because They Are Terrifying", 2018
- "Now Wait For This Week", 2019

=== Anthology appearances ===
- Rich Horton, ed. (2010). The Year's Best Science Fiction & Fantasy 2009 Edition. Prime Books. ISBN 9781607012146.
- Paula Guran, ed. (2015). The Year's Best Dark Fantasy & Horror 2015 Edition. Prime Books. ISBN 9781607014546.
- Jonathan Strahan, ed. (2017). The Best Science Fiction and Fantasy of the Year, Volume Eleven. Solaris Books. ISBN 9781781085622.
- Charles Yu; John Joseph Adams, eds. (2017). The Best American Science Fiction and Fantasy 2017. Mariner Books. ISBN 9780544973985.
- Victor LaValle; John Joseph Adams, eds. (2019). A People’s Future of the United States. One World. ISBN 9780525508809.
- Kelly Link; Gavin Grant, eds. (2019). Monstrous Affections: An Anthology of Beastly Tales. Candlewick. ISBN 9781536206418.
- Hannu Rajaniemi; Jacob Weisman, eds. (2019). THE NEW VOICES OF SCIENCE FICTION. Tachyon Publications. ISBN 9781616962913.

=== Anthology as editor/judge ===
- PEN America Best Debut Short Stories 2019. Catapult. 2019. ISBN 9781948226349. (with co-judges Carmen Maria Machado, Danielle Evans, and series editor Yuka Igarashi.)

=== Non-fiction ===
- "Bummed out and ugly on the occasion of Philip K. Dick's birthday". Guest Editorial. Asimov's Science Fiction. 38 (6): 4–6. June 2014.
