= Felix culpa =

Catholic theological concept

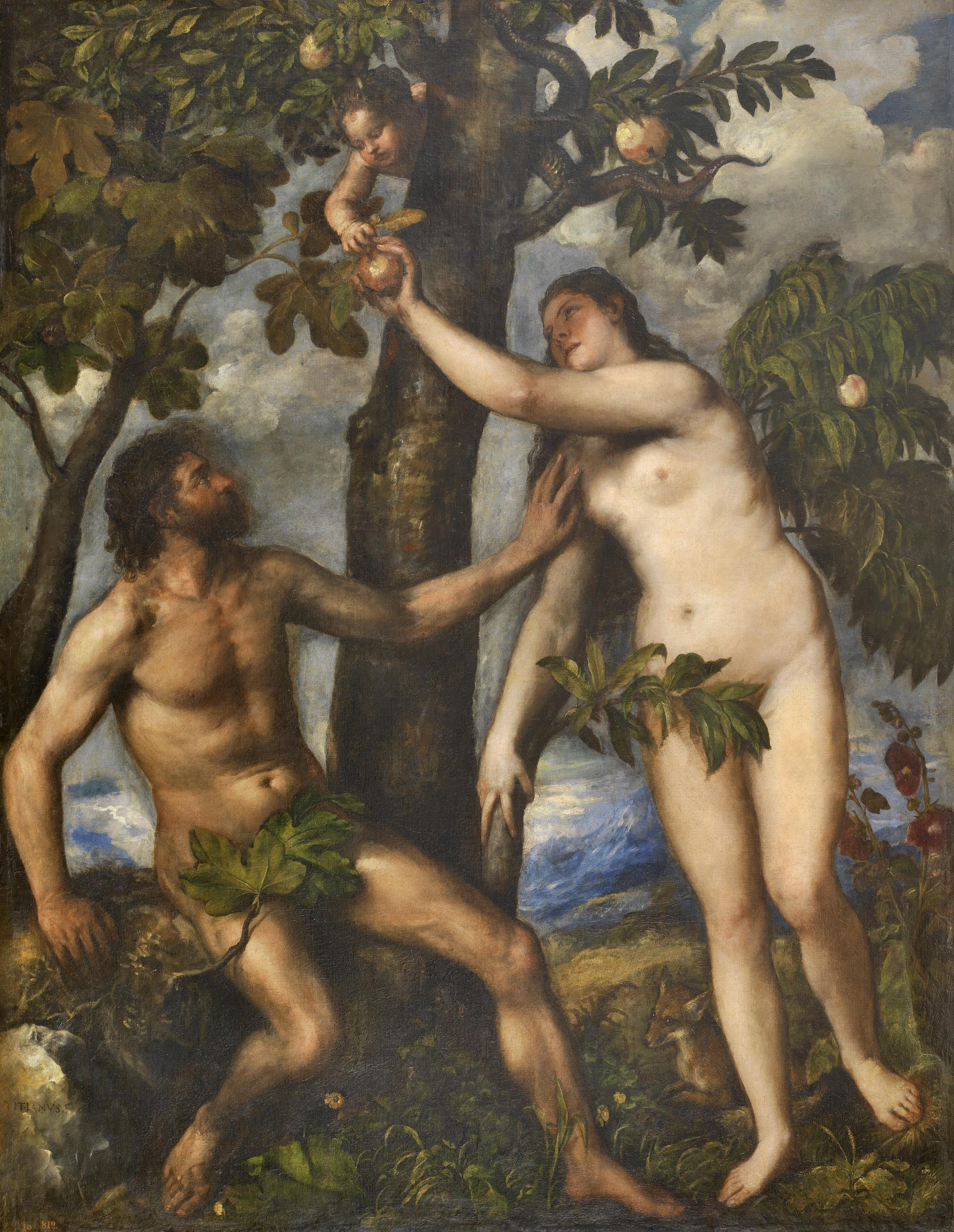
The Fall of Man by Titian, c. 1550

Felix culpa is a Latin phrase that comes from the words felix, meaning "happy," "lucky," or "blessed" and culpa, meaning "fault" or "fall". In the Catholic tradition, the phrase is most often translated "happy fault", as in the Catholic Exsultet. Other translations include "blessed fall" or "fortunate fall".

== Philosophy of religion ==
As a theological concept, felix culpa is a way of understanding the Fall as having positive outcomes, such as the redemption of humanity through the death and resurrection of Jesus Christ. The concept is paradoxical in nature as it looks at the fortunate consequences of an unfortunate event, which would never have been possible without the unfortunate event in the first place. In the philosophy of religion, felix culpa is considered as a category of theodicy explaining why God would create humans with the capacity to fall in the first place. As an interpretation of the Fall, the concept differs from orthodox interpretations which often emphasize negative aspects of the Fall, such as Original Sin. Although it is usually discussed historically, there are still contemporary philosophers, such as Alvin Plantinga, who defend the felix culpa theodicy.

== History ==
The earliest known use of the term appears in the Catholic Paschal Vigil Mass Exsultet: O felix culpa quae talem et tantum meruit habere redemptorem, "O happy fault that earned for us so great, so glorious a Redeemer." In the 4th century, Saint Ambrose also speaks of the fortunate ruin of Adam in the Garden of Eden in that his sin brought more good to humanity than if he had stayed perfectly innocent. This theology is continued in the writings of Ambrose's student St. Augustine regarding the Fall of Man, the source of original sin: “For God judged it better to bring good out of evil than not to permit any evil to exist.” (in Latin: Melius enim iudicavit de malis benefacere, quam mala nulla esse permittere.) The medieval theologian Thomas Aquinas cited this line when he explained how the principle that "God allows evils to happen in order to bring a greater good therefrom" underlies the causal relation between original sin and the Divine Redeemer's Incarnation, thus concluding that a higher state is not inhibited by sin.

In the 14th century, John Wycliffe refers to the fortunate fall in his sermons and states that "it was a fortunate sin that Adam sinned and his descendants; therefore as a result of this the world was made better." In the 18th century, in the appendix to his Theodicy, Leibniz answers the objection that he who does not choose the best course must lack either power, knowledge, or goodness, and in doing so he refers to the felix culpa.

The concept also occurs in Hebrew tradition in the Exodus of the Israelites from Egypt and is associated with God’s judgment. Although it is not a fall, the thinking goes that without their exile in the desert the Israelites would not have the joy of finding their promised land. With their suffering came the hope of victory and their life restored.

== Literature and art ==
In a literary context, the term felix culpa can describe how a series of unfortunate events will eventually lead to a happier outcome. The theological concept is one of the underlying themes of Cameron Reed's science fiction novel, The Fortunate Fall; the novel's title derives explicitly from the Latin phrase. It is also the theme of the fifteenth-century English text Adam lay ybounden, of unknown authorship, and it is used in various guises, such as "Foenix culprit", "Poor Felix Culapert!" and "phaymix cupplerts" by James Joyce in Finnegans Wake. John Milton includes the concept in Paradise Lost. In book 12, Adam proclaims that the good resulting from the Fall is "more wonderful" than the goodness in creation. He exclaims:

O goodness infinite, Goodness immense!
That all this good of evil shall produce,
And evil turn to good; more wonderful
Than that which creation first brought forth
Light out of Darkness! [...]

In Robert Frost’s poem “Unharvested,” the narrator is attracted to a “scent of ripeness from over a wall” and finds an apple tree that has dropped all its apples to the ground: “there had been an apple fall/ As complete as the apple had given man.” Reveling in the scent and beauty of the fallen apples, the narrator proclaims, “May something go always unharvested!/ May much stay out of our stated plan…”

== See also ==
- Principle of double effect
- Serendipity, a fortunate accident
- Silver lining (idiom)
