= The Bone Palace =

2010 novel by Amanda Downum

- Author: Amanda Downum
- Cover artist: Lary Rostant
- Series: The Necromancer Chronicles
- Genre: American Fantasy
- Published: 2010 (Orbit Books)
- Media type: Print (paperback)
- Pages: 480 (Mass Market Paperback)
- ISBN: 0316069000 (978-0316069007)
- Preceded by: The Drowning City
- Followed by: The Kingdom of Dust

The Bone Palace by Amanda Downum is a 2010 American fantasy novel centered on the fictional city of death, Erisin. It tells the story of the royal necromancer, Issylt Iskaldur and the princess mistress, Savedra Severos. These characters represent a strong sense of sexual identity that break the normalcy of typical castes. Critics praise the novel for its unique perspective on relevant subjects in the world today. It was nominated for the James Tiptree Jr. Memorial Award in 2010 and the Spectrum Award for Best Novel in 2011.

== Setting ==
The Bone Palace takes place in the royal city of Erisin. Erisin is a capital city described as being reminiscent of Rome during the Age of Enlightenment (18th century). The city is made up of high class, wealthy, and aristocratic families, but also poor and lower-classes. A plague has spread through the city and continues to lurk through the streets. Corpses are not a rare occurrence due to the plague and murders. The city is also haunted and filled with magical sorcerers. Monsters dubbed “Vampiric vrykoli” live underneath the city in vampire lairs, and demons are described as walking the streets. The city's center contains a ruined royal palace serving as the primary setting for the story’s major political and magical conflicts.

== Synopsis ==
When a prostitute dies carrying a royal signet, Isyllt Iskadur, necromancer and agent of the crown, investigates the murder and discovers that the vampires of Erisin are somehow involved. Unable to leave Forsythia's death unsolved, she continues her investigation which leads to more lies and secrets ahead. Meanwhile, inside the palace, Savedra Severos, the prince's transgender mistress, deals with assassination attempts and then stumbles upon the mystery of a missing Severos woman whom no one remembers. Savedra and Isyllt cross paths as they discover a conspiracy that links their two cases.

Savedra is the prince's mistress and the Severos household is always scheming for her to become the princess to add the Severos name among royalty. She begins her quest for answers when she hears about the murder Isyllt is investigating and tries to find out more about the mysterious murders and who plotted an assassination attempt on Ashlin. Her search leads her to the name Phaedra Severos, a member of her family, the problem is most of the information of Phaedra has been removed. Eventually, the plot thickens when Savedra hears the tale of Savedra; Savedra and Ashlin explore Phaedra's former fortress and Savedra has no one to trust with all the information she has uncovered, which is why she turns to Isyllt.

Isyllt, on the other hand, is investigating the Queen's stolen jewelry and the death of Forsythia. Isyllt's investigation leads her to the underground where the vampires dwell; it is there where she reunites herself with Spider and first learns about Spider's, a vampire that aids her or so it seems, plot for a revolution. In an attempt to find Forsythia's murderer Isyllt summons her spirit and discovers the scent of the murderer. At this point, Isyllt and Savedra come to the realization that their investigations may be intertwined and they begin working together.

With Isyllt and Savedra working together they now begin to close in on the scheme conducted by Varis, Kiril, and Phaedra. Throughout the novel Kiril is involved trying to persuade Isyllt to discontinue her investigation and at the same time he is plotting with Phaedra to overthrow the palace. Kiril is also a third narrator in the story who plays a significant role and as he is at the heart of the conspiracy and is someone who Isyllt loves dearly. Together Phaedra, Varis, and Kiril are plotting to overthrow the palace and alter Erisin's societal structure dramatically with the help of Spider and young vampires.

== Characters ==
- Ashlin: a barbarian princess with pale skin and blonde hair, wife of Nikos, fond of riding horses and sword fighting, who becomes increasingly close to Savedra.
- Savedra Severos: Mistress of Nikos who attempts to protect Nikos and Ashlin, falls in love with Ashlin, helps rescue Nikos and kill Phaedra.
- Captain Deneris: King Mathiros’ royal guard, helps Isyllt and Savedra rescue Nikos.
- Khelséa Shar: loyal, but not so intelligent police inspector, as compared to Isyllt. She assists Isyllt in investigating Forsythia's murder, and helps track down Phaedra in the end.
- Forsythia: is the prostitute who was killed by a vampire named Spider and a demon named Phaedra. Her lover, Whisper, was also a vampire, and he had given her the late Queen's ring.
- Whisper: like most modern-day vampires, had built a relationship with Forsythia, and unlike like most vampires, Whisper was always polite-as much as a monster could be. He always asked before drinking from Forsythia and gave her items from graves. He was also killed by Spider to throw Isyllt off the trail.
- Spider: a vampire who had an on and off relationship with Isyllt wanted to revolt against the Elders and not be prisoner to the darkness. He joined forces with Phaedra and Kiril to help Phaedra overthrow the king, but he was caught by Tenebris.
- Tenebris: the elder vampire, was intimidating and dedicated her time to the dark much like old perception of vampires. She was aware of Spider's intentions and actions all along, thanks to another vampire Azarné, and as punishment for his actions, Tenebris kills Spider.
- Azarné: the vampire that helped Isyllt out all along. She became infatuated with Ciaran and was the one to inform the Elder's about the planned revolution.
- Isyllt Iskladur: Erisin's Crown Investigator who is also a sorceress who apprenticed under her former lover Kirilos.
- Savendra Severos: the hijra bodyguard and mistress of Prince Nikos.
- Nikos: the “peacock like” crowned prince of Erisin whose main motive is to protect his kingdom.
- Kiril (Kirilos): former spymaster of King Mathiros and mentor of Isyllt Iskladur.
- Phaedra: the ex-lover of King Mathiros whose main motive is to seek revenge and take over Erisin.
- Varis Severos: Savendra's sorcerer uncle, is in love with Phaedra.
- King Mathrios: the father of Prince Nikos and former lover of Phaedra.
- Dahlia: a hijra sorceress who wants to track down the individual who murdered Forsythia.
- Ciaran: musician and former lover and close friend of Isyllt.

== Themes ==
=== Societal Roles ===
Leading The Bone Palace with strong female characters through the ability to make any role higher in class and more respected: it's captured through the method in making a transgender narrator a leader in their societal lifestyle, as she is the mistress to the Prince. Although the feminine roles are stronger than the masculine characters in the novel, the desire to convey the characters as a group that are of the "oversexed variety" is not approached as every character competes in their own manner in obtaining higher societal status without having preferences in sexuality, as in every character fills their hierarchical role regardless of gender. Savedra, even though she is a self-proclaimed bodyguard to the Prince and Princess, her transgender role is one "who loves to fight but isn't reduced to her tomboy archetype", and the being of her sexuality isn't conveyed to classify her as a different role compared to other individuals in Erisin. Relationships were not even based on jealousy or competition as Savedra and the Princess were close. Finally, Isyllt's history and relationships as it was from backgrounds that were previously studied uncovered more relation to comparing Erisin's hierarchical status and roles to the modern world.

== Awards ==
The Bone Palace was nominated for two different awards in the year 2011 and 2010. The recent nomination was for Best Novel for the 2011 Spectrum Award. The Gaylactic Spectrum Awards honor "outstanding works of science fiction, fantasy and horror which include significant positive explorations of gay, lesbian, bisexual or transgendered characters, themes, or issues". In the previous year, the book was nominated in the honors list of the James Tiptree, Jr. Award 2010. This represents the Science Fiction or Fantasy that explores and expands the roles of women and men for work by both women and men.
