= April Daniels (author) =

American author

- Education: University of California, Santa Cruz
- Occupation: Writer
- Writing career
- Period: 2017–present
- Notable works: Dreadnought, Sovereign

April Daniels is an American author of the Nemesis superhero trilogy.

== Personal life and education ==
Daniels lived in Ashland, Oregon until she was ten years old, where she was exposed to the Oregon Shakespeare Festival, before her family moved to Los Angeles, California. She was homeless in San Francisco for a time, and currently lives in Portland, Oregon. She graduated from the University of California, Santa Cruz, with a degree in literature. Daniels is a trans woman. Daniels is also a contributor to The Mary Sue.

== Nemesis series ==
Daniels' first book, Dreadnought, introduces a girl named Danny Tozer who inherits the mantle of her world's foremost superhero—the eponymous Dreadnought—which gives her powers like flight and the feminine body she has wanted ever since she realized she was transgender, and thrusts her into confrontation with a trans-exclusionary radical feminist (TERF) witch and other supervillains. It was a Lambda Literary Award finalist.

Daniels' second book, Sovereign, introduces a genderqueer superhero named Kinetiq, continues to explore the moral and mental health implications of Danny's fights with villains, and has her file for emancipation from her abusive family and find love.

A third and final installment in the Nemesis series is currently in development.

== Bibliography ==
=== Nemesis series ===
1. Dreadnought (2017) – ISBN 978-1682300688
2. Sovereign (2017) – ISBN 978-1682308240

== Awards ==
Year (Note: Year of award ceremony.)	Work	Award	Category	Result
2018	Dreadnought; Sovereign	James Tiptree Jr Memorial Award	—	Honor List
2018	Sovereign	Locus Awards	Young Adult	18th
