= Sandra McDonald =

American science fiction and fantasy author

- Education: Ithaca College; University of Southern Maine (MFA)
- Occupation: Author
- Writing career
- Genres: Science fiction; fantasy
- Notable awards: Lambda Literary Award for Science Fiction, Fantasy and Horror (2011)

Sandra McDonald is an American science fiction and fantasy author.

She is a graduate of Ithaca College, and earned a Master of Fine Arts degree in creative writing from the University of Southern Maine. She also spent eight years as an officer in the United States Navy, during which time she lived in Guam, Newfoundland, England, and the United States. She has also worked as a Hollywood assistant, a software instructor, and an English composition teacher. She teaches college composition 1 and 2 at Kaplan University online. She attended the Viable Paradise writers' workshop.

Her short story "The Ghost Girls of Rumney Mill" was shortlisted for the James Tiptree, Jr. Award in 2003. Her first novel, The Outback Stars, was published in April 2007, and was followed by two sequels: The Stars Down Under (2008) and The Stars Blue Yonder (2009).

Her short story collection Diana Comet and Other Improbable Stories won the Lambda Literary Awards for LGBT SF, Fantasy and Horror works in 2011.

Originally from Revere, Massachusetts, she lives in Jacksonville, Florida.

== Bibliography ==
=== Novels ===
- City of Soldiers

The Outback Stars series

1. The Outback Stars (2007). Tor Books. ISBN 0-765-31643-9
2. The Stars Down Under (2008). Tor Books. ISBN 0-765-31644-7
3. The Stars Blue Yonder (2009). Tor Books. ISBN 978-0-765-32041-4

=== Short fiction ===
Collections

- McDonald, Sandra (2010). Diana Comet and other improbable stories. Lethe Press.

Stories

| Year | Title | First published | Reprinted/collected | Notes |
|---|---|---|---|---|
| 2012 | The Black feminist's guide to science fiction film editing | McDonald, Sandra (December 2012). "The Black feminist's guide to science fiction film editing". Asimov's Science Fiction. 36 (12): 52–64. | | |
| 2012 | Sexy robot mom | | | |
| 2014 | Story of our lives | McDonald, Sandra (July 2014). "Story of our lives". Asimov's Science Fiction. 38 (7): 48–57. | | |
| 2016 | The people in the building | McDonald, Sandra (October 2016). "The people in the building". Asimov's Science Fiction. 40 (10 & 11): 66–71. | | |
| 2018 | Sexy Robot Heroes | | | |
| 2023 | Sexy Apocalypse Robots | | | |
