= In Universes =

2024 novel by Emet North

In Universes is a 2024 science fiction novel by Emet North.

== Publishing history ==
The novel was North's debut novel.

== Themes and analysis ==
Roseanna Pendlebury of Strange Horizons compared the novel to the works of Julia Armfield, saying that "the intimate personal portrait is the driving force behind the power of their fiction," while also arguing that "this isn’t a science fiction book interested in science. I am not certain how much I would call it a science fiction book at all, even, because it doesn’t feel in conversation with the genre. There are no visible threads leading back to older works of fiction, no obvious debts. Instead, it seems to have been inspired by real science, and more so philosophy, but owing its literary debts far more to the tone of mimetic fiction."

In an interview with Publishers Weekly, North stated that "one of the things I was most interested in is this question of how we differentiate our deepest desires from the desires that we absorb passively from society... I wanted to capture some of that messiness—not knowing which of your desires are actually your own, not knowing what’s authentic and what’s not, and the work you have to do if you don’t understand that early on."

== Critical reception ==
Molly Templeton of Esquire named In Universes as one of the thirty best science fiction novels of 2024, saying that "North balances the loss and uncertainty of Raffi’s varied existences with tenderness and sheer possibility. There are so many ways to be, and to love, and to find other versions of ourselves — even here, in our own singular universe." Publishers Weekly described the novel as "soul-stirring" and a "crackling chronicle of queer love." Paul Di Filippo of Locus Magazine compared the novel to Joanna Russ’s The Female Man and Marge Piercy’s Woman on the Edge of Time, saying that it displays "a deep humanism, lacking any kind of tendentious impulses, it explores the socially-embedded variable sexuality, and matters of will and kismet, of its protagonist with a kind of amiable, melancholy curiosity," and that "North’s prose throughout every section is both understated and poetic, full of gravitas yet unpretentious."

Roseanna Pendlebury of Strange Horizons described the novel as "a deep, compelling portrait of a flawed, hurting character."

== Awards ==
The novel was named one of the winners of the 2024 Otherwise Award.
