= Helene Wecker =

American speculative fiction author (born 1975)

- Wecker at World Fantasy Convention 2026
- Born: September 1975 (age 51); Libertyville, Illinois, U.S.
- Education: Carleton College (BA); Columbia University (MFA)
- Occupation: Novelist
- Writing career
- Genres: speculative fiction; fantasy; literary fiction
- Notable work: The Golem and the Jinni
- Website: www.helenewecker.com

Helene Deborah Wecker (born September 1975) is an American writer, author of the Mythopoeic Award-winning historical fantasy novel The Golem and the Jinni and its sequel, The Hidden Palace. The third book in the series/trilogy, The Gates of Midnight, was released in autumn 2026.

== Biography ==
Wecker was born and raised in Libertyville, a northern suburb of Chicago. After graduating with a Bachelor's Degree in English from Carleton College, she worked in marketing and communications in Minneapolis and Seattle before "deciding to return to her first love, fiction writing." Moving to New York, she received a Master of Fine Arts degree from Columbia University. Wecker currently resides near San Francisco with her husband and daughter.

== Literary career ==
Wecker's first novel, The Golem and the Jinni, was published by HarperCollins in April 2013. A sequel with the working title The Iron Season, along with a third novel, was sold in 2015 in a rumored seven-figure deal according to Publishers Weekly. It was initially projected for release in 2018, and was published on 8 June 2021 under the title The Hidden Palace. Wecker said in 2021 that while she was not "100% certain" about further sequels, she plans to write a third book in the series.

== Bibliography ==
=== Chava and Ahmad series ===
- The Golem and the Jinni (2013)
- The Hidden Palace: A Tale of the Golem and the Jinni (2021)
- The Gates of Midnight (2026)

=== Short fiction ===
- "Majnun" (2017)

== Awards ==
The Golem and the Djinni won the 2014 Mythopoeic Award for Adult Literature, was nominated for the 2014 Nebula Award for Best Novel and was a finalist for the 2013 James Tiptree Jr. Award. It placed second in the 2014 Locus Award for Best First Novel and the 2013 Goodreads Choice Award for Debut Author, and third in the 2013 Goodreads Choice Award for Fantasy.
