= The Girl in the Road =

2014 novel by Monica Byrne

- First edition
- Author: Monica Byrne
- Language: English
- Genre: Science fiction
- Publisher: Crown Publishing Group
- Publication date: May 20, 2014
- Publication place: United States
- Media type: Print
- Pages: 336 (hardback)
- ISBN: 978-0804138840

The Girl in the Road is a 2014 science fiction novel by Monica Byrne. It tracks two stories in parallel: one of a primary protagonist, Meena, as she crosses a floating energy-harvesting bridge that spans the Arabian Sea from India to Djibouti some time in the 2060s, and another of the youth and young adulthood of Mariama, who travels several decades earlier from Western Africa to Ethiopia.

The Girl in the Road is Byrne's debut novel. The Wall Street Journal described it as "a new sensation, a real achievement", while NPR criticized it, saying "the pulpiest of genre mysteries are shoved into the narrative, only to be neglected or resolved anti-climactically" and that "the result is a ragged patchwork of concepts, interconnections and intriguing possibilities, many of which wind up as red herrings." It shared the 2014 James Tiptree, Jr. Award with Jo Walton's My Real Children. It was also a finalist for the UK's Kitschies Golden Tentacle award for debut speculative fiction novel.

In August 2015, a German translation was published under the title Die Brücke (The Bridge).
