= Monica Byrne =

American playwright and science fiction author (born 1981)

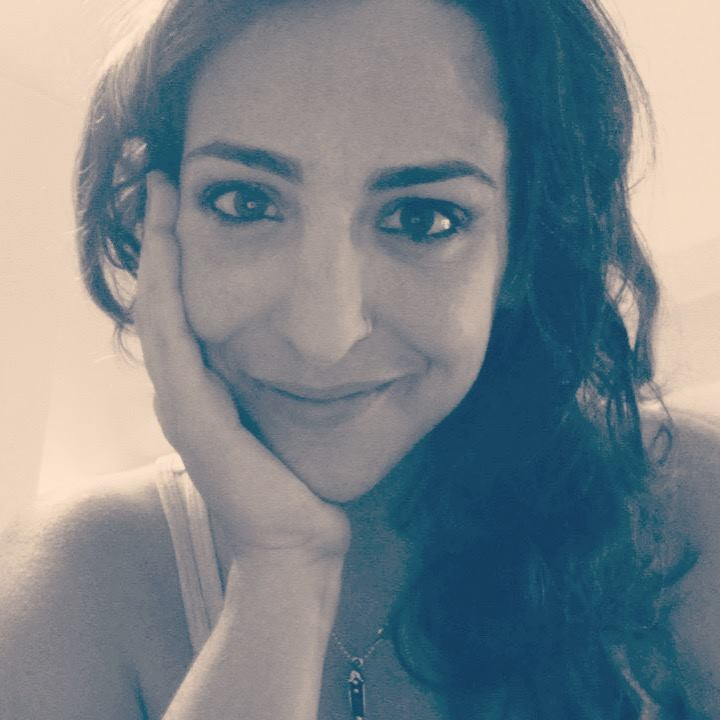
- Born: July 13, 1981 (age 45); Harrisburg, Pennsylvania, U.S.
- Education: Wellesley College (BA); Massachusetts Institute of Technology (MS); Clarion Workshop
- Occupations: Author, playwright
- Writing career
- Period: 2010–present
- Genre: Science fiction
- Notable work: The Girl in the Road
- Notable awards: James Tiptree, Jr. Award
- Website: monicabyrne.org

Monica Byrne (born July 13, 1981) is an American playwright and science fiction author. She is best known for her drama What Every Girl Should Know and her debut novel The Girl in the Road, which won the 2015 James Tiptree, Jr. Award and was nominated for the Locus and Kitschies awards.

== Life and career ==
Monica Byrne was born on July 13, 1981, in Harrisburg, Pennsylvania. The youngest of five children, she grew up in the college town of Annville, where her father was a lecturer at Lebanon Valley College. Her mother was diagnosed with brain cancer when Monica was seven, and died when Monica was 20.

She attended the Our Lady of the Valley Catholic School for girls in neighboring Lebanon. She earned a B.A. in biochemistry and religion at Wellesley College and an M.S. in geochemistry at MIT. Wanting to become an astronaut and go to Mars, she became an intern at NASA. However, instead of pursuing a scientific career, she decided to become a writer.

In 2008, she attended the Clarion Workshop with Neil Gaiman. She began writing fiction and plays. In 2011, she was artist-in-residence at Vermont Studio Center and Elsewhere Collective. From 2012 to 2017, she was the playwright-in-residence at Little Green Pig Theatrical Concern, in Durham, North Carolina. Her plays have been performed in other theaters as well.

Her drama What Every Girl Should Know, about girls at a Catholic girls school around 1914 who worship birth control and women's rights activist Margaret Sanger, was performed in Durham, Berkeley, and New York. The title of the play is drawn from the name of Sanger's sex education column in the New York Call, published in 1912 and 1913. Robert Hurwitt of the San Francisco Chronicle remarked that "Byrne's often clever, provocative script isn't fully fleshed out" and "the swift pacing doesn't make up for how thinly Byrne has developed her story or characters". Pat Craig of the San Jose Mercury News praised the "often lighthearted banter and genuine humor that makes the piece float and deliver some powerful messages without sounding the least like proselytizing".

Her first novel, The Girl in the Road (2014), is set in a future where India and Africa have become economic superpowers. It interleaves the stories of Meena, a young woman crossing the Arabian Sea westward from Mumbai to Djibouti on a floating power-generating bridge, and Mariama, a little girl riding a truck eastward across the African continent from Mauritania to Djibouti. The Wall Street Journal praised it as "a new sensation, a real achievement", whereas Jason Heller of NPR called it a "frustrating patchwork," albeit concluding "...it doesn't make The Girl in the Road's dizzying journey less than worthwhile."

Her second novel, The Actual Star (2021), takes place across three timelines − in the year 1012, in a declining Mayan kingdom; in 2012, following a young woman exploring her Belizean heritage; and in 3012, where a utopian genderless society has been established after climatic ruin destroyed much of the world. The novel was well received by critics − the New Scientist review called it a "stone-cold masterpiece", praising the pacing, characters, and societies. The Tor.com review called it "one of the most effective examples of worldbuilding you’re likely to see on a page this year", deeming it an "epic, visceral novel" that "bristles with ambition".

Byrne considers Norman Rush, Kim Stanley Robinson, and Ursula K. Le Guin as inspiration for her work.

== Works ==
=== Novels ===
- The Girl in the Road (2014)
- The Actual Star (2021)

=== Short fiction ===
- The Comedy at Kuala. In Electric Velocipede, Issue #21/22, Fall 2010
- Nine Bodies of Water. In Fantasy Magazine, September 2010
- Five Letters from New Laverne. In Shimmer, Number 12 (2010)
- Gustus Dei. In The Baffler, No 27 (2015)
- The Reclamation Rite of One April Nora Hess. In Gargoyle, Issue 56

=== Plays ===
- Miss America 1988 and The Last Human Conversation
- Poor Ball
- Nightwork (2011)
- The Memory Palace (2011)
- What Every Girl Should Know (2012)
- The Pentaeon (2012)
- Tarantino's Yellow Speedo (2014)

=== Non-fiction ===
- "Hey, Book World: Sexism is Way Bigger Than the Hugos". Wired. May 4, 2015.
- "Literature Still Urgently Needs More Non-White, Non-Male Heroes". The Atlantic. May 20, 2014.
- "To the Moon, from Chapel Hill". Our State. January 2013.
- Byrne, Monica (August 2012). "In Pursuit of World Peace". Independent Weekly.
- "Everything We Plant Grows". HowlRound. July 2012.
- "Only To Be There". Wellesley Magazine. Summer 2011.
