= Virginia Bergin =

English writer

Virginia Bergin (born 1966) is an English writer and poet.

== Early life ==
Bergin grew up in Abingdon, Oxfordshire, and now lives in Bristol. She studied psychology and fine arts at Central Saint Martins.

In 2017, Bergin won the Otherwise Award for her young adult science fiction novel Who Runs The World?, which was released in November 2018 in the United States under the title The XY. Bergin also wrote two other young adult science fiction novels in her dystopian The Rain series:

- The Rain (17 July 2014: Macmillan Children's Books ISBN 9781447266068 ), published in the United States as
  - H2O (Sourcebooks Fire; October 7, 2014 ISBN 9781492615323 )
- The Storm (26 February 2015 Macmillan Children's Books ISBN 9781447266105 )

Bergin also writes poetry, short stories, film and television scripts, such as the 2001 documentary television movie The Lost Elephants of Timbuktu, an episode of Natural World, and interactive courses for The Open University.
