= The Fortunate Fall (novel) =

1996 novel by Cameron Reed

- Original Tor cover by Bruce Jensen
- Author: Cameron Reed
- Cover artist: Bruce Jensen
- Genre: postcyberpunk science fiction novel
- Publisher: Tor Books
- Publication date: July 1996 to April 1997; rereleased in August 2024
- Publication place: United States
- Media type: Print (Hardcover & trade paperback)
- Pages: 288
- ISBN: 0-312-86034-X

The Fortunate Fall is the debut novel by Cameron Reed (writing at the time under the name Raphael Carter), published by Tor Books in 1996. The title comes from the Christian theological concept of felix culpa. It went out of print less than a year after being published, until it was re-released under her current name in 2024.

== Plot summary ==
The protagonist is Maya Andreyeva, a "camera" for a major news network in a 24th-century after the fall of a US world empire, where every nation is a third-rate power except hypertechnological Africa, which requires a blood test of aspiring immigrants.

As a "camera", Maya is heavily wired with sensory and telecommunications gear so that she can broadcast her perceptions, combining the functions of an on-location reporter and her camera crew, presenting both audiovisual data and its interpretation.

Carter uses the protagonist's occupation as a focal point for analyzing the role of the media in packaging, selling, and, thus shaping history and historical truth. The reader is taken through not only the familiar slanted research and writing of a piece, but also the careful cooking of raw sense data for broadcast by a screener, the one person who experiences the camera's full sense experience, precisely so that others do not. The screeners experience high turnover because of their unfortunate tendency to identify too closely, and fall in love, with the cameras who cannot share their unidirectional intimacy. The novel begins with Maya finding herself saddled with a new and problematic screener - one who appears to her only through the net, never in person, and who is a woman, contrary to all custom in her heterocentric dystopia.

In the virtual company of this mysterious woman, Maya grapples with conspiracy, totalitarianism, mind control, race, sexuality, as well as the nature of the mind and free will.

== Themes and significance ==
The novel plays with a number of literary themes and elements, but can be broadly categorized as "postcyberpunk", i.e. science fiction dealing with the consequences of a drastically computerized and networked society, however with much more direct experience with IT and without thematic limitations of first-wave cyberpunk.

The novel "mixes broad themes like homophobia, censorship and government surveillance with the shared intimacies and vulnerabilities of individuals who live outside the boundaries accepted by society" and "explores the relationship between man and machine in an increasingly wired world."

== Awards ==
The Fortunate Fall was well received. Noted in one review as "a superb example of speculative fiction," the book was included in the Locus recommended reading list. It was 4th in the Locus Award among first novels and led to Carter's nomination for the John W. Campbell Award for Best New Writer in 1997 and 1998. In her 2010 retrospective review, writer and critic Jo Walton described it as "certainly one of the most important books of the last twenty years."

== See also ==
- Cyberpunk
- Lesbian science fiction
