= The Golem and the Jinni =

2013 novel by Helene Wecker

- First edition (hardcover)
- Author: Helene Wecker
- Audio read by: George Guidall
- Cover artist: Richard Ljoenes
- Language: English
- Genre: Historical fiction/fantasy
- Publisher: Harper
- Publication date: April 1, 2013
- Publication place: United States
- Media type: Print (hardcover & paperback), e-book, audiobook
- Pages: 496
- ISBN: 978-0-062-11083-1
- Followed by: The Hidden Palace

The Golem and the Jinni (published as The Golem and the Djinni in the United Kingdom) is a debut novel written by Helene Wecker, published by Harper in April 2013. It combines the genre of historical fiction with elements of fantasy, telling the story of two displaced magical creatures in 19th century New York City. A sequel, The Hidden Palace, was published in June 2021.

== Background ==
Wecker wished to write a story about the blending of Jewish and Arabic cultures, and her novel is a "metaphorical autobiography" according to scholar Brian Attebery. Wecker is Jewish and her husband Arab, and she said that elements of the story were inspired by "similarities between our families, the way that certain themes echo between them". A mythical creature from each tradition is portrayed in the book, in the golem and the jinni.

== Plot summary ==
In the Polish town of Konin at the end of the 19th century, a corrupt kabbalist named Yehudah Schaalman creates a golem in the shape of a woman at the request of young Otto Rotfeld, who seeks a submissive, attentive, and curious wife. Rotfeld dies during a subsequent sea voyage to New York City, leaving the newly awakened golem in an unfamiliar environment. A rabbi in New York takes in the golem and, naming her Chava, starts teaching her to pass as human among the diverse groups of people living in New York. Meanwhile, a tinsmith in New York's Little Syria accidentally frees a jinni from a flask in which he has been imprisoned for a millennium. With no memory of how he was subdued, the jinni is virtually powerless and trapped in human form. He takes the name Ahmad and apprentices with the tinsmith while searching for a way to return to his natural form.

Chava and Ahmad eventually meet, recognizing each other as inhuman, and become friends, though they have different views on being inhuman while living in a human world. Chava seeks to be more human and fears losing control and exposing herself, whereas Ahmad holds a jaded view towards social restraints and engages in hedonistic pursuits. Chava and Ahmad's influence on the lives of the people around them comes to a climax as Chava's creator comes to New York, intent on finding the secret to eternal life. He is discovered to be a reincarnation of the evil sorcerer who trapped Ahmad.

== Critical reception ==
The Golem and the Jinni received mostly positive reviews. Kirkus Reviews gave the novel a starred review stating Wecker "writes skillfully, nicely evoking the layers of alienness that fall upon strangers in a strange land". Entertainment Weekly gave the book an "A" grade saying: "The book's magic, filtered through the old-time hustle and bustle of the Lower East Side, lingers long after the final page." Reviewer Curt Schleier said: "The story is so inventive, so elegantly written and so well constructed that it's hard to believe this is a first novel." The Publishers Weekly review concluded with: "The ending dips into melodrama, but the human touches more than compensate in Wecker's spellbinding blend of fantasy and historical fiction." Criticism of the book focused on the book's length and narrative pacing, with one reviewer saying the story gets "swamped by pages and pages of the jinni's ancient backstory, historical minutiae and the histrionics and melodrama of the sorcerer's quest for eternal life."

In 2014 the novel was nominated for the Nebula Award for Best Novel and the World Fantasy Award for Best Novel, and won the 2014 Mythopoeic Award.

The audiobook presentation, narrated by George Guidall, was a finalist for a 2014 Audie Award.

== Themes ==
Reviewers noted the themes of immigration within the novel. The New York Times said the novel "neatly lends itself to allegory, contrasting several Old Worlds with the immigrant experience and its new class divisions." USA Today remarked that the novel is "a traditional story about assimilation, as the Golem and the Jinni navigate life under challenging constraints and are forced to suppress their true natures. The immigrants around them, too, struggle in a new world that is strange and suspicious of their presence. Above all, this is a story about the painful burdens of history and identity."

Reviewer Abigail Nussbaum, writing for Strange Horizons, believes the novel has a strong theme of loneliness, stating: "Chava and Ahmad are doubly isolated, unable to look inward and find solace in their community as the humans around them do, " and "...even human characters like Rabbi Meyer, Michael, and Arbeely are unable to find solace for their loneliness in communal living."

== Sequel ==
The Hidden Palace: A Tale of the Golem and the Jinni was published on June 8, 2021. The conclusion to the trilogy, The Gates of Midnight, was released in autumn 2026.

== Works cited ==
- Attebery, Brian (2022). Fantasy: How It Works. Oxford University Press. doi:10.1093/oso/9780192856234.001.0001. ISBN 978-0-19-285623-4.
