= Laurie J. Marks =

American fantasy author (born 1957)

- Born: March 27, 1957 (age 69); Orange County, California, U.S.
- Education: Brown University
- Occupation: Novelist
- Spouse: Deb Mensinger (m. 2004)
- Parent(s): Marjory Marks; Donald Marks

Laurie J. Marks (born March 27, 1957) is an American author of fantasy novels.

== Life ==
Inspired by C.S. Lewis, Laurie wrote her first novel at twelve. Her determination to become a fantasy novelist led her to take a typing class and all the writing classes she could. After attending a small Christian college for two years, Laurie transferred to Brown University to finish her degree. After graduating, Laurie roamed around for a few years living in many different places. She came out as a lesbian at age 29. She and her then partner, Deb Mensinger, tried to run a farm in California, but when Mensinger became ill with a rare congenital disease, the two moved to Massachusetts, where they married in 2004, in the first week same-sex marriages became legal. Until her retirement Marks taught writing at the University of Massachusetts Boston. In the late aughts, Marks struggled with a serious injury while also acting as caregiver to her wife, who had become disabled due to her illness. This, with the concomitant financial struggles, affected her ability to write, and she was dropped by her publisher. In 2023, Marks announced that retirement has allowed her to begin writing again.

In 2003, her novel Fire Logic, the first in her Elemental Logic series, won the Gaylactic Spectrum Award for best novel; in 2005 Earth Logic, the second in the series, won the same award. In 2007 she was Guest of Honor at the WisCon science fiction convention.

== Bibliography ==
=== Elemental Logic series ===
The Elemental Logic series is set in the world of Shaftal. Some 35 years prior to the first book, Shaftal was invaded by an army of Sainnites who, in an attempt to eradicate the magic which might be used against them, killed all the elemental witches they could locate. However they failed to realise that magic is inherent in the Shaftali and children have been born since who can wield it. Furthermore, the Sainnites have become cut off from their homeland and are subject to constant guerilla action from the Shaftali. Among both the learned, peace-loving Shaftali and the warlike, spartan Sainnites, women and men are equals in all things, including military, and both queer and polyamorous/polygamous relationships are common and accepted.

1. —— (2002). Fire Logic. Tom Doherty Associates. ISBN 978-0312878870.
2. —— (2004). Earth Logic. Tor Books. ISBN 978-0765348388.
3. —— (2007). Water Logic. Small Beer Press. ISBN 978-1931520232.
4. —— (2019). Air Logic. Small Beer Press. ISBN 978-1618731609.

=== Children of the Triad series ===
1. —— (1989). Delan the Mislaid (paperback ed.). DAW. ISBN 978-0886773250.
2. —— (1990). The Moonbane Mage. Illustrated by Anne Yvonne Gilbert. DAW. ISBN 978-0886774158.
3. —— (1991). Ara's Field. Illustrated by Anne Yvonne Gilbert. DAW. ISBN 978-0886774790.

=== Other works ===
- —— (1992). The Watcher's Mask. DAW. ISBN 978-0886775100.
- —— (1993). Dancing Jack. DAW. ISBN 978-0886775780.
- —— (2003). How the Ocean Loved Margie. Archived from the original on September 25, 2004.
