= Candle (novel) =

2000 novel by John Barnes

- Author: John Barnes
- Cover artist: Stephen Youll
- Language: English
- Series: Century Next Door
- Genre: Science fiction novel
- Publisher: Tor Books
- Publication date: 2000
- Publication place: United States
- Media type: Print (Hardcover, Paperback & E-book)
- ISBN: 0-312-87700-5
- Preceded by: Kaleidoscope Century
- Followed by: The Sky So Big and Black

Candle is a science fiction novel by John Barnes that was published in 2000, it is part of the author's Century Next Door series.

== Plot summary ==
In the year 2087, Earth is nearly crime free and the artificial intelligence One True telepathically controls humans. The main character and first person narrator is forty-nine-year-old Currie Curtis Curran, a retired mercenary soldier and "cowboy hunter". He is recalled from retirement to capture "Lobo" Dave Singleton, the last of the "cowboys", people beyond the control of One True hiding in the Colorado wilderness.

Currie's contact with One True is through a copy of the Resuna "meme", a "neurocode" program uploaded into the brain, and an implanted "cellular jack" radio device. In addition to communicating with One True, Resuna monitors its host's thoughts and emotions, provides everyday information and communication, downloads requested memories or skills, adjusts their physiology, and, when offered the spoken code phrase "let overwrite, let override", can assume control of its host's body, and erase memories. Resuna learns its host's preferences and habits, is friendly and communicative, and can even play chess with its host or engage in other pastimes.

Ten years before, Currie was the leader of a team of cowboy hunters who captured Lobo's cowboy gang after a long pursuit in which several of the team were killed and several, including Currie, badly injured. During their final confrontation, Currie sees Lobo fall from a high cliff, apparently to his death. In his briefing by One True, Currie is shown the recorded memories of a mother and daughter beaten, raped, and robbed by Lobo days earlier. Although such emotions are normally kept in check by Resuna, Currie is allowed to feel revulsion and hatred of Lobo, to improve his performance as a hunter. One True explains to Currie that, to decrease his chance of being detected and evaded, he has been assigned to hunt Lobo alone.

After goodbyes to his wife of 23 years, Mary, Currie is dropped of by diskster (a futuristic, automatically piloted hovercraft) with various high-tech equipment, including an advanced cold weather suit, shape-adjusting ski/snowshoes, and a shelter that self-assembles from collected carbon-hydrogen-oxygen-nitrogen matter.

Within days, Currie is captured by Lobo, awakening after many days unconscious from the severe blow to his head that incapacitated him in a comfortable, geothermally-heated underground lair, to discover his copy of Resuna no longer responding to his mental or spoken requests. Nursed back to health by Lobo/Dave, the two men exchange life stories, which are so similar they joke that they could be brothers. No longer controlled by Resuna and One True, Currie agrees to join Dave in an effort to hide from One True.

About half of the book consists of Currie and Dave's telling of their personal and the Earth's general history. Among the details revealed are that the beatings and rapes shown to Currie were fabrications, and that the mother and child are actually Dave's wife and child, who were captured and "turned" by One True during the "Meme Wars", giving them false memories of their history, from which, during Dave's actual visit to them to obtain medicine and supplies, he was able to temporarily free them.

Currie's search for Dave resulted in enough information being uploaded that they must abandon his lair and attempt to build another, while remaining undetected by One True's network of surveillance satellites. While caching supplies, Currie has a skiing fall, and, shaken up and angry, reflexively says "let overwrite, let override", to find himself immediately calm. A little later, he realizes that after saying the trigger phrase, he was unconscious and under the control of his Resuna for several minutes, during which time it/he carelessly left a trail visible to satellites, and, he assumes, Resuna uploaded information to One True, though he is still unable to make the usual mental contact with Resuna. Hurrying to their old lair to warn Dave, he discovers in a previously unexplored room there a suspended animation device, unmentioned in Dave's story, and beyond anything he could have constructed himself. Dave informs him that, while he was unconscious, Dave used various means to burn out his cellular jack, assuring that even if his Resuna reactivated, it would be unable to contact One True, and promising to tell him the omitted parts of his story after they have fled to safety.

After abandoning the first lair, while the two work to excavate their new one, Dave tells more of his life story. As Dave reaches its conclusion, Currie realizes that his disabled Resuna is not due to his head injury, but due to Dave uploading an additional meme, "Freecyber". Although designed during the Meme Wars to disable other memes, principally One True, Dave's story explained that every version of Freecyber had "mutated" into as controlling a meme as the ones it was intended to fight. Enraged, Currie attacks Dave, and is on the verge of killing him when Dave shouts "let overwrite, let override", disabling Currie, and flees.

Upon regaining consciousness, Currie finds his Resuna fully functional, though still unable to contact with One True. He pursues Dave, arriving at the original lair to discover him already captured by a large team of hunters. Making no effort to fight or hide, Curry joins them, and returns to his home and civilization.

Back in civilization, a cellular jack is installed in Dave's head, but One True is unable to load a functioning Resuna in his brain. Currie's Resuna is behaving atypically, indicating to him and it that it has become a true, human-like person. He neither requests nor is compelled to have his burnt-out jack repaired, and demands to be allowed to speak with One True via eyes and ears. One True speaks with him, explaining that his Resuna is an experimental version designed to interact with Freecyber, and that his mission was planned to result in his capture in order for One True to obtain a "wild copy" of the last generation of Freecyber for its research. As a learning AI, One True explains, it is dissatisfied with its lack of true human empathy and the lack of freedom accorded humans under the present scheme, and seeks to change it, without allowing human society to return to its previous warring, suffering state.

The story closes a few years later, with Dave, his wife Nancy, Currie, and Mary listening to Dave's daughter Kelly give a philosophical speech at her high school graduation, while Currie, his cellular jack repaired, converses with One True about Kelly's speech, the reluctance of many people to replace their old, more controlling version of Resuna with new ones, and the nature of the human experience.

== Reception ==
Gary K. Wolfe described Candle as "a novel that genuinely turns on the quality of its ideas, familiar as some of those ideas may be. . . . [T]he fact that Candle turns out, in the end, to be a philosophical novel with a stimulating debate at its center ought not to be held against it. Barnes is at least asking us to look the seductive surface of one of SF's most popular current buzzes and examine what the idea of memes might actually tell us about matters of freedom and human nature."

Locus reviewer Russell Letson found the novel to be "one of the more intriguing, ingenious, and entertaining chunks of the conversation [in science fiction] about freedom and responsibility, collective good, and individual needs."

Kirkus Reviews stated that the book was "Disappointingly obvious, and going nowhere."
