= Andrea Hairston =

African-American science fiction and fantasy playwright and novelist

- Andrea Hairston at Voyage Into Genre Live event, St. Joseph's University, May 17, 2024
- Born: 1952 (age 73–74); Pittsburgh, Pennsylvania, U.S.
- Education: Smith College (BA); Brown University (MA)
- Occupations: Playwright; novelist; theatre professor; director; performer
- Writing career
- Period: 1979–present
- Genres: Science fiction, fantasy
- Website: www.andreahairston.com

Andrea Hairston (born 1952) is an African-American science fiction and fantasy playwright and novelist.

== Early life and education ==
Hairston was born and raised in Pittsburgh, Pennsylvania, where as a teenager she did community organizing work with union, civil rights and antiwar activism.

After graduating from Smith College in 1974, Hairston completed her Master of Arts degree at Brown University in 1977.

== Career ==
Her novel Redwood and Wildfire won the James Tiptree Jr. Award for 2011. Mindscape, Hairston's first novel, won the Carl Brandon Parallax Award and was short-listed for the Philip K. Dick Award and the James Tiptree Jr. Award. Hairston was one of the guests of honor at the science fiction convention Wiscon in May 2012.

She is the artistic director of Chrysalis Theatre and has created original productions with music, dance, and masks for more than a decade. Hairston is also the Louise Wolff Kahn 1931 Professor of Theatre and Afro-American Studies at Smith College. She teaches playwriting, African, African American, and Caribbean theatre literature. Her plays have been produced at Yale Rep, Rites and Reason, the Kennedy Center, StageWest, and on public radio and television. In addition, Hairston has translated plays by Michael Ende and Kaca Celan from German to English.

== Personal life ==
She lives in Northampton, Massachusetts.

== Awards ==
- 2011 James Tiptree Jr. Award for Redwood and Wildfire
- International Association of the Fantastic in the Arts Distinguished Scholarship Award for distinguished contributions to the scholarship and criticism of the fantastic, 2011
- 2006 Carl Brandon Parallax Award for Mindscape, 2010
- Launch Pad—Fellow at NASA-funded Writer's Workshop, August 2008
- Guest of Honor, Diversicon Science Fiction Convention, Minneapolis, MN, August 2007
- James Tiptree Jr. Award Finalist for Mindscape, 2006
- Philip K. Dick Award Finalist for Mindscape, 2007
- Older Writers Grant, Speculative Literature Foundation for Exploding in Slow Motion excerpt, 2004.
- NEA Grant to Playwrights, a Ford Foundation grant to collaborate with Senegalese Master Drummer Massamba Diop, and a Shubert Fellowship for Playwriting.
- Archangels of Funk was shortlisted for the 2025 Ursula K. Le Guin Prize.

== Works ==
=== Novels ===
- Mindscape (Aqueduct Press, 2006)
- Redwood and Wildfire (Aqueduct Press, February 2011)
- Impolitic! (Aqueduct Press, 2012)
- Lonely Stardust (Aqueduct Press, 2014)
- Will Do Magic for Small Change (Aqueduct Press, 2016)
- Master of Poisons (Tor Books, 2020)
- Archangels of Funk (Tor Books, 2024)
- The Redemption Center is Closed on Sundays (Macmillan Publishers, May 2026)

=== Short fiction ===
- "Griots of the Galaxy" in Hopkinson, N. and Uppinder, M., eds., So Long Been Dreaming: Postcolonial Visions of the Future, Arsenal Pulp Press, 2004
- "Excerpt from Mindscape", in Thomas, S.R., ed., Dark Matter: Reading The Bones: Speculative Fiction from the African Diaspora, Grand Central Publishing, 2004.
- "Saltwater Road" in Lightspeed, Issue 62, July 2015
- "Dumb House" in Shawl, N., ed., New Suns: Original Speculative Fiction by People of Color, Rebellion Publishing, 2019.

=== Articles and essays ===
- "'I Wanna Be Great!': How to Rescue the Spirit in the Wasteland of Fame" in Donkin, E. and Clement, S., ed., Upstaging Big Daddy: Directing Theater as if Gender and Race Matter, University of Michigan Press, 1993.
- "Driving Mr. Lenny: Notes on Race and Gender as a Transport to Another Reality, Another Dimension" in The International Review of Science Fiction, 2004
- “Octavia Butler–Praise Song to a Prophetic Artist” in Larbalestier, J., ed., Daughters of the Earth: Feminist Science Fiction in the Twentieth Century, Wesleyan University Press, 2006
- "King Kong" in Duchamp, L. T., ed., The WisCon Chronicles, Vol. 1, Aqueduct Press, 2007
- "Double Consciousness" in Barr, M., ed., Afro-Future Females: Black Writers Chart Science Fiction’s Newest New Wave Trajectory, Ohio State University Press, 2008
- "Lord of the Monsters—Minstrelsy Redux: King Kong, Hip Hop, and the Brutal Black Buck" in the Journal of the Fantastic in the Arts
- "Romance of the Robot: From RUR & Metropolis to WALL-E" in Kelso, S., ed., The WisCon Chronicles, Vol. 4, Aqueduct Press, 2010.
- "Stories Are More Important than Facts: Imagination as Resistance in Guillermo del Toro’s Pan’s Labyrinth" in Duchamp, L. T., ed., Narrative Power: Encounters, Celebrations, Struggles, Aqueduct Press, 2010.
- "Heretical Connectedness: An Appreciative Look at Symbiotic Planet by Lynn Margulis" in Cascadia Subduction Zone, Vol. 1., No. 4, October 2011.
- "Different and Equal Together: SF Satire in District 9" in Journal of the Fantastic in the Arts, Vol. 22, No. 3, 2011.
- "Guest of Honor 2012 Speech" in Vanderhooft, J., ed., The WisCon Chronicles, Vol 7., Aqueduct Press, 2013.
- "Disappearing Natives: The Colonized Body is Monstrous" in Extrapolation, Vol. 54, No. 3, 2013.
- "Dismantling the Echo Chamber: On Africa SF" in Los Angeles Review of Books, 16 January 2014.
- "Ghost Dances on Silver Screens: Pumzi and Older than America" in Extrapolation, Vol. 57, No. 1-2, 2016.
- "What Art Does: 'When the World Wounds' by Kiini Ibura Salaam" in Los Angeles Review of Books, 25 March 2017.
- "It’s Our Time: Women of Wakanda", Los Angeles Times, 8 September 2018.

=== Plays ===
- On Display - Do Not Touch (1977)
- Signs of Life (1987)
- The Black Women’s Survival Kit (1988–1989)
- It's Not Too Late (1994), with Pan Morigan
- Dancing With Chaos (1995)
- Strange Attractors (1996, 1997)
- Lonely Stardust (1998)
- Hummingbird Flying Backward (2000)
- Soul Repairs (2002)
- Archangels of Funk (2003–2005)
- Dispatches (2008–2009)
- Thunderbird at the Next World Theatre (2014)

=== Collections ===
- Impolitic! with Notkin, D., Aqueduct Press, 2012
- Lonely Stardust: Two Plays, a Speech, and Eight Essays, Aqueduct Press, 2014
