= Kaleidoscope Century =

1995 novel by John Barnes

- First edition cover
- Author: John Barnes
- Cover artist: Bob Eggleton
- Language: English
- Series: Century Next Door
- Genre: Science fiction
- Publisher: Tor Books
- Publication date: 1995
- Publication place: United States
- Media type: Print
- Pages: 252
- ISBN: 0312855613
- Preceded by: Orbital Resonance
- Followed by: Candle

Kaleidoscope Century is a science fiction novel by John Barnes. First published in 1995, it is part of the author's Century Next Door series.

== Plot summary ==
The narrator Joshua—at first appearing to be just over 60 years old, wakes up May 27, 2109 in an apartment on human-settled Mars. With no memory of his past, he goes to his werp, a voice-activated laptop computer, and learns that his name is Joshua Ali Quare and that he was born in 1968. From this frame story and a box containing several objects from his past, Quare pieces together what he believes is true about his life leading to the early 22nd century. It is soon clear that he is unburdened by any form of morality.

Joshua ran away from home early in his teens to escape his abusive father, and stayed in an upstairs apartment at Gwenny's Diner. Joshua's mother, a Communist party member, surreptitiously helped him. He entered the US Army at the behest of some Party organizers, and he was put in contact with a KGB operative who provided him with an injection to keep him from receiving or transmitting AIDS (which mutates into mutAIDS and spreads soon after, wiping out a large percentage of the population of Earth). The injection also enhanced his memory, and periodically regenerates his body, so that he becomes 10 years younger with each 15-year life period. This makes him a longtimer, and gives him the side-effect of having his memory wiped after every life period.

Joshua's US Army career is spent in Operation Desert Storm (the First Oil War in the novel) and the "Second Oil War" which culminated in a march on Tehran. After the collapse of the Soviet Union, the KGB diversified and became "the Organization," a counter-insurgency group that supplied technical and logistic support to every side in the Eurowar, a NATO-Central European Union-Russian conflict in the early 21st century. Among the innovations of the Eurowar were Simulation Modeling Optimizing Targeters (SMOTs) a jump from smart weapons to "brilliant weapons" that attacked an enemy country's natural resources and means of production. These weapons cause massive environmental damage to the earth, and are the predecessors of the memes. Joshua, as an agent for The Organization, begins his violent operative career with a gang rape involving US soldiers, and then sets out a series of terrorist-like missions to intensify the war. During the Eurowar, Joshua raped a woman and killed her and her family (perhaps the only disturbing memory he regrets), murdered many soldiers and civilians, suppressed science and research through rape and torture, and essentially caused mayhem along with other Organization longtimers, for great sums of pay. After the Eurowar ended, Joshua took in "Alice", a war orphan from Prague in an incident where he got the dog tag – and inspiration for future alias – "John Childs".

In the 2010s, the Organization abandoned Joshua, who then joined the Reconstruction after the Eurowar and worked in Quito, Ecuador on the GeoSync Cable and saw with Alice the beginning of the development of memes that would unify all countries and religions, leading to the War of the Memes (referred to in some of Barnes' other books) that culminated in the takeover of Earth by One True. Alice runs away, and the Organization finds and rehires Joshua to fight in the War of the Memes, for One True. By the time One True consolidated its hold on the people of Earth, Mars, the Jupiter and Saturn systems had been colonized for decades. Joshua steals another person's ID and becomes an ecoprospector on Mars.

The best scientists and engineers of free humanity had developed the technology to unleash a singularity at the edge of the Solar System that would provide a return point in time and space for the descendants of five transfer ships sent to colonize other nearby star systems. When Joshua finally ventures forth to meet his Organization contact in Red Sands City, he's confronted by a tremendous hustle and bustle of people preparing for the transfer ship descendants to arrive from the 25th century and either destroy One True (and the population on Earth under its control) or confine it there.

A fellow Organization agent named Sadi has been in Joshua's life one way or another since the inception of the Organization. On Mars, Sadi, who's also a longtimer, meets Joshua as a woman, Sadi's original gender, and now gender of choice. This is possible due to the Organization perfecting the regeneration process, now called 'revival', which also gave Sadi complete memory recovery and a permanent 20-year-old body. From Sadi, whom Joshua had met as a woman after the Eurowar and was partnered with when Sadi was male during the War of the Memes, Joshua learns that it's possible to go through the singularity to 1988, when the technology to construct it was first built and put into orbit by the Soviets. By the time of the novel's frame story, Sadi has done this thirty times, each time changing history to his/her benefit. After Joshua's revival and a time as Sadi's lover, Joshua, who's repeatedly refused to accompany Sadi on these excursions through the singularity, (also known as a closed timelike curve), is sent by her via force on a preset course through the singularity once more. Sadi claims to have brought Joshua back in time with her before, without being revived, so she could 'help' Joshua love her as obsessively as Sadi loves him. Now she wants him to experience the freedom she's had, in hopes of having him come back to her for good. Joshua makes plans when he comes back to the late 20th century to change history himself, many times over, alone.

== Critical reaction ==
Writer Jo Walton declared: "Kaleidoscope Century is one of the most unpleasant books I’ve ever read, I can hardly believe I’ve read it again. All the same it's a major work and very nearly a masterpiece... This is the most unsuitable book for children in the history of the universe... But despite making no sense, rape, murder, and a very unpleasant future, it's still an excellently written and vastly ambitious book, with a scope both science fictional and literary. That's what ultimately makes it a good book, though I do not like it."

Kirkus Reviews wrote: "Grim, sinewy, consistently surprising, and—despite Barnes's habitual, and always irksome, present-tense narration— unforgettable." Publishers Weekly stated: "Whether or not one is put off by the pervasive cynical mentality, as a picture of the degradation of society in the 22nd century, the novel is gripping." Chris Gilmore of Interzone opined that "it's as a study in evil that this book must stand or fall, and as such it falls victim to its own singleminded superficiality."
