= Fortunate Fall (band) =

- Origin: Inglewood, California, United States
- Genres: Melodic Death Metal, Grindcore, Anarcho-Metal, Metalcore, Thrash Metal
- Years active: 2009–present
- Label: Riot Ready Records
- Members: Wesley Richards; Nathan Evan Williams; Paul Allen

Fortunate Fall is an anarcho-metal band from Inglewood, California. They write, produce, and distribute all of their music in true DIY fashion through the indie label Riot Ready Records.

Founded in 2009, chief songwriter Wesley Richards has released all of the band's music under his label and recording studio Riot Ready Records with founding members Nathan Evan Williams on drums and Paul Allen on bass. Fortunate Fall's style has several different elements of extreme metal while leaning heavily on melodic death metal and grindcore, and touch on topics such as working-class rights and mental health.

The band is known for their aggressive melodies and subject matter, but also for their DIY ethic and approach to production and touring. In addition to self-producing and distributing all of their releases under the indie label Riot Records Records, the band's two major tours were self-managed and funded as well. They released a number of early demos and splits with other metal bands from predominantly the LA-based metal scene developing a devout cult following among the LA area coastal cities, leading to the 2013 release of A Death Related Party. It was after this release that their reputation for chaotic, aggressive live shows began to spread, often opting to perform in the middle of the floor as opposed to the stage. Following the release of 2014's Camera Obscura, the band embarked on their first coast-to-coast tour, again delivering their unique on-stage antics to the soundtrack of their aggressive high octane music but this time in front of a national audience. After the release of their third full-length album The Orange Scare in March 2017, they again embarked on a nationwide tour. They returned to LA and in 2018 to release their fourth full-length release The Black Party.

== Style ==
Fortunate Fall plays a blend of several musical styles, usually focusing in death metal and grindcore with elements of metalcore and powerviolence. Fortunate Fall lyrically focuses on far-left and anarchist-based sociopolitical commentary. Chief songwriter and producer Wesley Richards is a common contributor to several local Los Angeles anarchist outlets, and has been involved in numerous progressive activist movements. Richards draws from a number of eclectic influences, including southern California skate punk and the Houston underground hardcore scene, as well as underground death metal and grindcore. Several elements are prevalent throughout their releases, one of the most recognizable aspects being the high speeds at which they play, rarely stopping to catch their breath during an album or set.

== Discography ==
Year of US Release	Title	Label
2010	Venom Lab Split	Riot Ready Records
2012	Last Funeral EP	Riot Ready Records
2013	A Death Related Party	Riot Ready Records
2014	Camera Obscura	Riot Ready Records
2017	The Orange Scare	Riot Ready Records
2017	The Opposition Party EP	Riot Ready Records
2018	Class War: Metal, Hardcore & Violence (Compilation)	Riot Ready Records
2018	The Black Party	Riot Ready Records
2019	Neighborhood Watch: Grind, Death & Crust (Compilation)	Riot Ready Records
