= Congenital Agenesis of Gender Ideation =

1998 science fiction short story

""Congenital Agenesis of Gender Ideation" by K.N. Sirsi and Sandra Botkin" is a 1998 science fiction short story by American writer Cameron Reed, writing as Raphael Carter. It was first published in the anthology Starlight 2.

== Synopsis ==
Rather than being a conventional narrative, "Congenital Agenesis of Gender Ideation" is presented as a scientific paper in which two researchers describe a rare condition whereby individuals are unable to perceive gender — or, rather, are able to so accurately perceive subtle differences in gender and sex (being able to distinguish, simply by looking at a photograph, categories as disparate as 'born with hypospadias', 'takes supplemental sex hormones after a hysterectomy', and 'has a high androgyny score on the Bem test') that they find the terms 'male' and 'female' hopelessly inadequate.

== Reception ==
"Congenital Agenesis of Gender Ideation" won the 1998 James Tiptree Jr. Award and was a semi-finalist for the 1998 Theodore Sturgeon Award.

Gardner Dozois considered it to have "some very intriguing ideas", but to be "as dry as the form it is mimicking" (i.e., academic literature). Strange Horizons observed that the story's "premise seems simple" but relies on a notion which is "both challenging and invasive." At the SF Site, Paul Kincaid called it "extraordinary," with "unique brilliance" and "startling power".
