= Amanda Downum =

American fantasy author

Amanda Downum is an American fantasy author best known for her Necromancer Chronicles trilogy: The Drowning City (2009), The Bone Palace (2010), and Kingdoms of Dust (2012). For these novels, which explore of LGBT topics and characters, she was nominated for the Gaylactic Spectrum Award, David Gemmell Award, and James Tiptree, Jr. Award. Downum’s books consist of themes relating to identity, gender roles and sexuality, death, secrets and social stratification.

== Early life ==
Amanda Downum was born on July 15, 1979 into a middle-class family in Virginia Beach, Virginia. Downum's parents would read Downum fantasy/science fiction authors such as J. R. R. Tolkien, C. S. Lewis, Ursula K. Le Guin and, Madeleine L'Engle. As Downum grew older, she formed a Goth persona from reading novels such as The Hobbit and Prince Caspian and reading H. P. Lovecraft's horror novels. These authors/books have influenced Downum's genre, fantasy fiction, since her early childhood.

Downum wanted to be a writer at the age of six and her first attempt at writing a novel was in high school. Many of her present characters and events were created/drawn from her early unpublished writings and/or childhood memories. Downum graduated from the University of North Texas with a degree in English Literature and a minor in German. During her time at college, she considered being a writer again when she found an online writing workshop and realized that she could drastically improve her writing.

== Influences ==
Over the course of her writing career, Amanda Downum has been inspired by "books, movies, music, the news, boring road trips, and dreams". Her three favorite contemporary authors and biggest influences are Barbara Hambly, Elizabeth Bear, and Caitlin R. Kiernan. According to Downum, her focus in fantasy should primarily be credited to her mother, who read the young Downum numerous fantasy novels, including Tolkien, Lewis, Le Guin, and L'Engle. Later on in her life, Hurricane Katrina coupled with her experiences living in Asia inspired her to write The Drowning City, book one in her Necromancer Chronicles trilogy. The Hobbit, and particularly the character Sauron, known and referred to as the Necromancer, captivated her interest in the darker side of fantasy characters and helped inspire her Necromancer Chronicles.

== Personal life ==
Amanda Downum resides in a home near Austin, Texas. She has traveled to Indonesia and Micronesia and has spent time in Missouri, Arizona, California, and Colorado. Although Downum does not speak often on politics or religion in any of her blogs or interviews, some of the organizations and associations that she supports include The National Association to Protect Children, RAINN, Lambda Legal, and Amnesty International. Among other things, Downum creates jewelry for her brand Still So Strange Studios; her interests also include rock climbing and cooking.

== Bibliography ==
=== Novels ===
- The Drowning City (2009)
- The Bone Palace (2010)
- Kingdoms of Dust (2012)
- Dreams of Shreds and Tatters (2015)
- The Poison Court (2019)

=== Short story collections ===
- Still So Strange (2018)

=== Short stories ===
Here's a list of Amanda Downum's short stories:

- "Smoke & Mirrors" (2006)
- "Snake Charmer" (2006)
- "The Garden, the Moon, the Wall" (2006)
- "Flotsam" (2006)
- "Brambles" (2006)
- "And in the Living Rock, Still She Sings" (2006)
- "Dogtown" (2006)
- "Gingerbread and Time" (2006)
- "Wrack" (2006)
- "Ebb" (2007)
- "The Salvation Game" (2007)
- "Pinion" (2008)
- "Ballistic" (2008)
- "Ghostlight" (2008)
- "Aconite & Rue" (2009)
- "The Tenderness of Jackals" (2009)
- "Blue Valentine" (2011)
- "Red" (2012)
- "Bone Garden" (2012)
- "Spell 81A" (2012)
- "Snakebit" (2014)

== Awards ==
Amanda Downum first received recognition for her novel, The Drowning City, when it was shortlisted for the 2009 David Gemmell Morning Star Award. The Drowning City also received a nomination the following year, in 2010, for the David Gemmell Legend Award. In December 2010, Downum's second novel in the Necromancer Chronicles, The Bone Palace, was shortlisted for the James Tiptree, Jr. Award. Downum's inclusion of significant positive explorations of gay, lesbian, bisexual or transgender characters, themes, and issues in The Bone Palace also resulted in her 2011 nomination for the Gaylactic Spectrum Award.
