= Aqueduct Press =

American book publisher

- Founded: 2004; 22 years ago
- Founder: L. Timmel Duchamp
- Country of origin: USA
- Headquarters location: Seattle, Washington
- Distribution: Pathway Book Service
- Fiction genres: Speculative fiction, feminist fiction
- Official website: Aqueductpress.com

Aqueduct Press is a publisher based in Seattle, Washington, United States, that publishes material featuring a feminist viewpoint.

== History ==
Aqueduct Press was founded in 2004 by L. Timmel Duchamp. The company has focused on publishing speculative fiction that contains a feminist element. Since 2004 they have been publishing the Conversation Pieces which is written by many authors and contains chapbooks with poems, fiction and essays.

Aqueduct Press has published multiple award-winning and short-list nominee titles. Their first winning title was Life by Gwyneth Jones, which was published in 2004. It won the 2005 Philip K. Dick Award and was a short-list nominee for the 2005 James Tiptree Jr Memorial Award and placed 27th on the 2005 Locus Awards for best science fiction novel. Also in 2004, L. Timmel Duchamp's Love's Body, Dancing in Time was a short-list nominee for the 2005 James Tiptree Jr Memorial Award and placed 21st in the 2005 Locus Awards for best collection, and Nicola Griffith's With Her Body was a finalist at the 2005 Gaylactic Spectrum Awards for best other work and at the 2005 Lambda Literary Award for best science fiction/fantasy/horror. In 2006, Andrea Hairston's Mindscape was a finalist for the 2007 Philip K. Dick Award and was named as an honour book at the 2007 James Tiptree Jr Memorial Awards. Kelley Eskridge's Dangerous Space placed 17th in the 2008 Locus Awards and in 2009, Filter House by Nisi Shawl won the James Tiptree Jr Memorial Award and was a short-list nominee for the 2009 World Fantasy Awards best collection.
