= Cameron Reed =

American science fiction author

Cameron Reed is an American science fiction author whose work, while sparse, has met with considerable acclaim. Reed is transgender and uses she/her and they/them pronouns.

== Career ==
Reed's first novel, The Fortunate Fall, was published in 1996 under the name Raphael Carter. It was later re-released under Reed's current name in 2024. Described by critic Tim Hilchey as "a superb example of speculative fiction,", the novel appeared on the Locus recommended reading list, and in the Locus Award it was 4th among first novels, after two tied winners. Reed was consequently nominated for the John W. Campbell Award for Best New Writer in 1997 and 1998.

Reed's short story "'Congenital Agenesis of Gender Ideation' by K.N. Sirsi and Sandra Botkin" was shortlisted for the Theodore Sturgeon Award and won the James Tiptree, Jr. Award in 1998. This made Reed the first non-female author to be the sole winner of the Tiptree (Theodore Roszak having been a co-winner with Elizabeth Hand in 1995). At the time of winning the award, Reed self-identified "as neither female nor male".

Reed also wrote the "Androgyny Rarely Asked Questions" and "The Murk Manual: How to Understand Medical Writing on Intersex". Between May 1998 and April 2002, she maintained the Honeyguide Web Log, described as an "eclectic weekly list of links emphasizing books, robotics, and the natural sciences." This was the first site to be named a weblog after Jorn Barger's example, and Reed launched the first weblog directory at the Open Directory Project in November 1998. On her website she also wrote essays about gender that engaged with early online transgender, androgyne, neuter, and non-binary communities.

Reed's 2025 story "The Girl That My Mother Is Leaving Me For" was a finalist for the Hugo Award for Best Novelette. Her second novel, What We Are Seeking, was published by Tor Books in April 2026.

== Personal life ==
Reed is a nonbinary trans woman. She moved from Phoenix, Arizona, to Minneapolis, Minnesota, in 1995.

== Works ==
=== Novels ===
- The Fortunate Fall (1996, Tor Books, ISBN 0-312-86034-X)
- What We Are Seeking (2026, Tor Books, ISBN 978-1-250-36473-9)

=== Stories ===
- "'Congenital Agenesis of Gender Ideation' by K.N. Sirsi and Sandra Botkin" (1998, in Starlight 2, edited by Patrick Nielsen Hayden, Tor Books)
- "The Girl That My Mother Is Leaving Me For" (2025, Reactor)
