= Otherwise Award =

Annual American literary prize

The Otherwise Award, originally known as the James Tiptree Jr. Award, is an American annual literary prize for works of science fiction or fantasy that expand or explore one's understanding of gender. It was initiated in February 1991 by science fiction authors Pat Murphy and Karen Joy Fowler, subsequent to a discussion at WisCon, a feminist SF conference.

In addition to the award itself, the judges publish an Honor List, which they describe as "a strong part of the award's identity", "used by many readers as a recommended reading list".

In 2024, the award administrators announced that they would be switching from a single winner each year to a shortlist of three to six winners.

The award was originally named for Alice B. Sheldon, who wrote under the pseudonym James Tiptree Jr. Due to controversy over the appropriateness of naming an award after Tiptree, the committee administering the award announced on October 13, 2019, that the award would be renamed the Otherwise Award.

== Background ==
=== Choice of the Tiptree name ===
By choosing a masculine nom de plume, having her stories accepted under that name and winning awards with them, Alice Sheldon helped demonstrate that the division between male and female science fiction writing was illusory. Years after "Tiptree" first published science fiction, Sheldon wrote some work under the female pen name "Raccoona Sheldon"; later, the science fiction world discovered that "Tiptree" had been female all along. This discovery led to widespread discussion over which aspects of writing, if any, have an intrinsic gender. To remind audiences of the role gender plays in both reading and writing, the award was named in Sheldon's honor at the suggestion of Karen Joy Fowler.

=== Controversy and name change ===
In 2019, controversy arose over the appropriateness of naming an award after Tiptree. In 1987, Alice Sheldon shot and killed her ailing husband Huntington Sheldon before killing herself in the same manner. Although some have called the killing a "suicide pact" based on Sheldon's personal writings, others characterize the act as "caregiver murder"—i.e., the murder of a disabled person by the person responsible for caring for them. In light of these allegations, the Tiptree Motherboard received requests to change the name of the award. On September 2, 2019, in response to these requests, the Motherboard made a statement that "a change to the name of the Tiptree Award is [not] warranted now"; but nine days later, on September 11, they announced that the award "can't go on under its existing name".

On October 13, 2019, the Tiptree Motherboard released an announcement stating that the Tiptree Award would become the Otherwise Award. The name refers to "the act of imagining gender otherwise" at the core of what the award has always honored, as well as being "wise to the experience of being the other". The title also draws from the Black queer scholarship of Ashon Crawley around what is termed "otherwise politics". According to the statement, "Otherwise means finding different directions to move in—toward newly possible places, by means of emergent and multiple pathways and methods."

== Administration ==
The Otherwise award is administered by a panel called the "Motherboard".

Fundraising efforts for the award have included publications (two cookbooks), "feminist bake sales", and auctions. The Tiptree cookbook The Bakery Men Don't See, edited by WisCon co-founder Jeanne Gomoll, was nominated for a 1992 Hugo Award. Otherwise Award juries traditionally consist of four female and one male juror (the "token man"). The auctions were one of the keynote events of WisCon, and they were run by author Ellen Klages from their inception in 1994 until 2016. A variety of items were auctioned, ranging from signed first editions of art or written works by SF luminaries and authors, such as Octavia Butler, Ursula K. Le Guin, Suzette Haden Elgin, Freddie Baer, and many others, to quirky items with some connection to feminism, science fiction, or fandom, such as a hand-knitted uteruses created by Klages, letters, photos, memorabilia, toys, and art. Artist Freddie Baer produced an annual collage, which was printed on t-shirts and posters, in support of the organization.

In 2011, the Motherboard received the Science Fiction Research Association's Thomas D. Clareson Award for Distinguished Service for its "outstanding service activities – promotion of SF teaching and study, editing, reviewing, editorial writing, publishing, organizing meetings, mentoring, and leadership in SF/fantasy organizations".

== Anthologies ==
Selections of the winners, various short-listed fiction, and essays have appeared in four Tiptree-related collections, Flying Cups and Saucers (1999) and a series of annual anthologies published by Tachyon Publications of San Francisco. These include:

- Flying Cups and Saucers: Gender Explorations in Science Fiction and Fantasy edited by the Secret Feminist Cabal and Debbie Notkin (1999)
- The James Tiptree Award Anthology 1 edited by Karen Joy Fowler, Pat Murphy, Debbie Notkin, and Jeffrey D. Smith (2005)
- The James Tiptree Award Anthology 2 edited by Karen Joy Fowler, Pat Murphy, Debbie Notkin, and Jeffrey D. Smith (2006)
- The James Tiptree Award Anthology 3 edited by Karen Joy Fowler, Pat Murphy, Debbie Notkin, and Jeffrey D. Smith (2007)

== Winners ==
Otherwise Award winners
Year	Author(s)	Work	Publisher	Ref.
1991	Eleanor Arnason	A Woman of the Iron People	William Morrow	
1991	Gwyneth Jones	White Queen	Victor Gollancz Ltd	
1992	Maureen F. McHugh	China Mountain Zhang	Tor	
1993	Nicola Griffith	Ammonite	Del Rey Books	
1994	Ursula K. Le Guin	"The Matter of Seggri" in Crank! #3, spring 1994	Broken Mirrors Press	
1994	Nancy Springer	Larque on the Wing	AvoNova	
1995	Elizabeth Hand	Waking the Moon	HarperPrism	
1995	Theodore Roszak	The Memoirs of Elizabeth Frankenstein	Random House	
1995	Suzy McKee Charnas	Motherlines	Berkeley-Putnam	
1995	Suzy McKee Charnas	Walk to the End of the World	Ballantine	
1995	Ursula K. Le Guin	The Left Hand of Darkness	Walker & Co.	
1995	Joanna Russ	The Female Man	Bantam Books	
1995	Joanna Russ	"When It Changed" in Again, Dangerous Visions	Doubleday	
1996	Ursula K. Le Guin	"Mountain Ways" in Asimov's Science Fiction, August 1996		
1996	Mary Doria Russell	The Sparrow	Random House	
1997	Candas Jane Dorsey	Black Wine	Tor	
1997	Kelly Link	"Travels with the Snow Queen" in Lady Churchill's Rosebud Wristlet Volume 1, Number 1, winter 1996–1997	Small Beer Press	
1998	Raphael Carter	"Congenital Agenesis of Gender Ideation" in Starlight 2	Tor	
1999	Suzy McKee Charnas	The Conqueror's Child	Tor	
2000	Molly Gloss	Wild Life	Simon & Schuster	
2001	Hiromi Goto	The Kappa Child	Red Deer Press	
2002	M. John Harrison	Light	Victor Gollancz Ltd	
2002	John Kessel	"Stories for Men" in Asimov's Science Fiction, October/November 2002		
2003	Matt Ruff	Set This House in Order: A Romance of Souls	HarperCollins	
2004	Joe Haldeman	Camouflage	Ace	
2004	Johanna Sinisalo	Not Before Sundown (Ennen päivänlaskua ei voi); Published in the United States as Troll – a love story	Peter Owen Publishers	
2005	Geoff Ryman	Air	St. Martin's Griffin	
2006	Shelley Jackson	Half Life	HarperCollins	
2006	Catherynne M. Valente	The Orphan's Tales: In the Night Garden	Spectra Books	
2006	Julie Phillips	James Tiptree, Jr.: The Double Life of Alice B. Sheldon	St. Martin's Press	
2007	Sarah Hall	The Carhullan Army	Faber and Faber (UK 2007); HarperCollins (US 2008)	
2008	Patrick Ness	The Knife of Never Letting Go	Walker & Co. (UK); Candlewick Press (US)	
2008	Nisi Shawl	Filter House	Aqueduct Press	
2009	Greer Gilman	Cloud and Ashes: Three Winter's Tales	Small Beer Press	
2009	Fumi Yoshinaga	Ōoku: The Inner Chambers	Hakusensha (Japan); VIZ Media (English-speaking world)	
2010	Dubravka Ugresic	Baba Yaga Laid an Egg	Canongate Books	
2011	Andrea Hairston	Redwood and Wildfire	Aqueduct Press	
2012	Caitlín R. Kiernan	The Drowning Girl	Roc Books	
2012	Kiini Ibura Salaam	Ancient, Ancient	Aqueduct Press	
2013	N. A. Sulway	Rupetta	Tartarus Press	
2014	Monica Byrne	The Girl in the Road	Penguin Random House	
2014	Jo Walton	My Real Children	Tor	
2015	Eugene Fischer	"The New Mother" in Asimov's Science Fiction, April/May 2015	Dell Magazines	
2015	Pat Schmatz	Lizard Radio	Candlewick Press	
2016	Anna-Marie McLemore	When the Moon Was Ours	Thomas Dunne Books / St. Martin's Griffin	
2017	Virginia Bergin	Who Runs the World?	Macmillan	
2018	Gabriela Damián Miravete	"They Will Dream in the Garden"	Latin American Literature Today	
2019	Akwaeke Emezi	Freshwater	Grove Press	
2020	Oghenechovwe Donald Ekpeki	Ife-Iyoku, the Tale of Imadeyunuagbon	Aurelia Leo	
2021	Ryka Aoki	Light from Uncommon Stars	Tor Books	
2021	Rivers Solomon	Sorrowland	MCD Books	
2022	On hold			
2023	On hold			
2024	Emet North	In Universes	HarperCollins	
2024	P. C. Verrone	"Kiss of Life"	FIYAH	
2024	Vajra Chandrasekera	Rakesfall	Macmillan	
2024	Dolki Min, translated by Victoria Caudle	Walking Practice	HarperCollins	
2025	Silvia Park	Luminous	Simon & Schuster	

== See also ==
- Gender in speculative fiction
- Sense of Gender Awards
- Sex and sexuality in speculative fiction
- Women in speculative fiction
- Women science fiction authors
