= A Million Open Doors =

1992 novel by John Barnes

- First edition
- Author: John Barnes
- Cover artist: John Harris
- Language: English
- Series: Thousand Cultures series
- Genre: Science fiction
- Publisher: Tor Books
- Publication date: October 1992
- Publication place: United States
- Media type: Print (hardback & paperback)
- ISBN: 0-312-85210-X
- OCLC: 26217511
- Dewey Decimal: 813/.54 20
- LC Class: PS3552.A677 M55 1992
- Followed by: Earth Made of Glass

A Million Open Doors (1992) is a science fiction novel by American writer John Barnes, the first book of his Thousand Cultures series. The story is told from the perspective of a maturing adult from a parochial culture who encounters many obstacles in a different and even more parochial culture which causes him to become a fully engaged citizen in the Interstellar culture. A Million Open Doors is a study of the effects of globalization.

The novel was nominated for the Nebula Award for Best Novel in 1992 and the Arthur C. Clarke Award in 1994.

== Plot summary ==
The story begins sometime in the 29th century on the planet Wilson (orbiting Arcturus) with a young man named Giraut and his romantic, swashbuckling friends, who are all members of the Nou Occitan culture and residents in the Quartier de Jovents, a sort of playground for teens and twenty-somethings who have not yet moved on to the more "grown-up" lifestyle of their parents. Technologically safeguarded, these young adults have swordfights in the streets with "neuroducer" épées and frequent the taverns of the Quartier, living in an imaginative recreation of Occitan literature and the trobador tradition.

However, Giraut is forced to grow up much more quickly than most of his friends, because one day his friend Aimeric, who was, before coming to Wilson and becoming a jovent, an economist in the Caledon culture of the nearest inhabited planet, Nansen (orbiting Mufrid), is called upon by the government to return to his home planet on a mission to regulate the effects of the springer on Caledonian economy. The springer is a method of instantaneous transportation which is quickly reuniting humanity across known space.

Giraut decides to leave when he catches his girlfriend getting into the Interstellar "arts scene" (the art is called "sadoporn") which is an acting out against the exclusive values and code of honor valued by Giraut and his friends. Thus, Aimeric and Giraut advise the rational council of the Caledonians to adjust their economy to that of the rest of the universe so that the springer will have as few adverse effects as possible.

When the Caledonians decide that Aimeric and Giraut, as well as the Interstellar government, are trying to usurp their power, they begin to try to seize back control of everything, and an urban conflict ensues. Giraut discovers among the strife who he really is and begins to see how fake his life back home was, and recognize faults in his home culture.

== Literary significance and criticism ==
In her review at tor.com, Jo Walton called the book a "wonderful immersive science fiction novel," and wrote that "this is perhaps his best book."

== See also ==
- Interstellar teleporter
- Tunnel in the Sky
- Gridlinked

Other books in this series

- Earth Made of Glass (1998)
- The Merchants of Souls (2001)
- The Armies of Memory (2006)
