= Directive 51 =

Directive 51 may refer to:

- Directive 51 (novel) by John Barnes
- George W. Bush's National Security and Homeland Security Presidential Directive 51
