= Earth Made of Glass =

1998 novel by John Barnes

- Author: John Barnes
- Language: English
- Series: Thousand Cultures series
- Genre: Science fiction
- Publisher: Tor Books (US), Orion Books (UK)
- Publication date: Apr 1998
- Publication place: United States
- Media type: Print (hardback & paperback)
- ISBN: 0-7653-0330-2
- OCLC: 60799717
- Dewey Decimal: 813/.54 22
- LC Class: PS3552.A677 A89 2006
- Preceded by: A Million Open Doors
- Followed by: The Merchants of Souls

Earth Made of Glass (1998) is a science fiction novel by American writer John Barnes, the second book of his Thousand Cultures series. The story is told from the perspective of a middle-aged special agent named Giraut. Earth Made of Glass examines religious extremism when two different cultures are forced into proximity.

== Plot summary ==
Giraut and Margaret, now married, are sent on a diplomatic mission to the politically turbulent planet Briand, a distant Outer Sphere colony cut off from the rest of humanity for centuries until instantaneous travel became possible with the springer. Not only is Briand a very hot, high gravity planet, but the oppressive environment is matched by the increasing hatred between the two proud local cultures which have been forced to live in close proximity as a result of a volcano disaster—the Tamil Mandalam culture of New Tanjavur (based on an interpretation of Sangam literature) and the Maya culture that has been forced to live in the slum of Mayatown and the newly-grown city of Yaxkintulum after the destruction of their native Kintulum (based on an interpretation of pre-Columbian Maya civilization), have strained relations to the point that the Council of Humanity fears that full-scale war or ethnic cleansing may envelop Briand. Giraut and Margaret are given orders by Shan, their Office of Special Projects supervisor, to find the real power brokers of each culture in order to defuse the headline-grabbing daily ethnic attacks and steer the planet clear of all-out war. They must do this under the nose of Ambassador Kiel, a high ranking ambassador from Earth on Briand, who believes strengthening elected government officials is the only way to address a crisis.

Giraut and Margaret arrive as their marriage is falling apart, but focus on their work and establish contact with key Tamil people. They are assigned a Tamil assistant, Kapilar, with whom they both spend a lot of time. They are at first unable speak directly to the reclusive Mayans, except for Tz'iquin, the Mayan contact in New Tanjavur. After a small mob attacks Paxa Prytanis, another secret agent sent by the Office of Special Projects, an invitation by the Maya comes unexpectedly. Giraut, Kapilar and Tz'iquin travel to Yaxkintulum in the latter's flying yacht, as the Mayans have officially refused to adopt the springer as well as other technological conveniences, and rely on simple subsistence farming in order to preserve their cultural heritage. Giraut meets Tz'iquin's grandfather, Pusiictsom, the most powerful and influential priest in Yaxkintulum, who, despite being in charge of the traditionally conservative Center Temple, is a reformer working on reconciliation with the Tamils behind the scenes. A plan is put into motion where Pusiictsom's nephew is raised to the position of prophet under the name "Ix," with a plan to move to Yaxkintulum and start a cult movement of tolerance, modernization and truth about the founding of the two cultures. The plan calls for the new cult to be brutally oppressed by Mayan authorities, and Giraut, Kapilar, Ix and Tz'iquin stage an escape to New Tanjavur.

Through a series of public appearances, Ix begins to recruit Mayans and some Tamils to his cult. He starts dating Auvaiyar, a notable and famously attractive Tamil critic several years his junior who had previously been involved with Tz'quin, Kapilar and Kannan, a deeply bigoted Tamil critic and poet who heads the avant-garde movement and hopes to create a Fourth Sangam. The rumor that Ix has an affair with a Tamil causes mass riots, which Ix unexpectedly ends by confessing in public, despite Pusiictsom's protests, that his prophecy began as a ploy by his family, the Peccaries. Tz'iquin breaks into tears during his uncle's speech, revealing to Giraut his jealousy at his uncle's upcoming marriage to his former girlfriend. Just prior to Ix's next speech, however, Auvaiyar is found dead, her heart and lungs missing. Ix reacts calmly to the discovery, and decides to show the corpse to the crowd during his speech. Giraut and Kannan bring her body to the central plaza, before the temple of Murukan where Ix was going to wed Auvaiyar. As the prophet speaks to the mixed Tamil/Mayan crowd, he uses his pain, her murder and his forgiveness to whoever did it as a starting point for reconciliation between the two cultures.

Tz'iquin comes forth, confesses Auvaiyar's murder (saying that he ate her heart, as Tohil is known to do), and shoots his uncle in the head with a maser. Kannan goes on a murderous rampage against the Mayans as a full-scale race war erupts. Giraut and Kapilar run back to the Embassy, where the former is ordered to evacuate it immediately. Almost everyone in the embassy is evacuated through springers to Earth, but Ambassador Kiel is captured by Tamils, and Kapilar refuses to go, choosing instead to join the fighting to honor his Vellala heritage.

Giraut, Margaret and Shan watch the civil war unfold from a space station in the Inner Sphere. Mayan forces invade New Tanjavur through Pusiictsom's secret springer, an attack that the Peccaries had been planning for at least a year. Illegal anti-matter weapons are used by both sides, completely destroying both Yaxkintulum and New Tanjavur. The habitable areas of Briand are devastated, and with no springers left intact, the planet becomes isolated from the rest of humanity until a springer ship can arrive in several decades' time.

Giraut finds out from Margaret that she had been having an affair with Kapilar since the mission began, and was ordered to not break it off by his friend and boss Shan, who hoped he could acquire valuable intelligence through Kapilar. The failure of the Office of Special Projects on Briand forces the secretive agency into the limelight, and they brace for public scrutiny and oversight. Giraut opts to take his one-year-long leave on the Hedon culture of Söderblom to try to salvage his marriage and to get away from Shan, but after that one year, he wants back into the Office of Special Projects to continue the important mission of integrating humanity to provide a united front for possible alien contact.'

== Reception ==
Kirkus Reviews called it an "intelligent, well-researched, adroitly handled and absorbing cultural clash with a notably surprising conclusion." Don D'Ammassa of the Science Fiction Chronicle praised the characterisation and the "surprising and unsurprising" climax. Mark L. Olson of the Aboriginal Science Fiction praised the Barnes's worldbuilding and called the novel his "best work to date" and a "very strong Hugo contender".

== See also ==
- Interstellar teleporter
- Tunnel in the Sky
- Gridlinked
