= The Last President =

2013 novel by John Barnes

- Author: John Barnes
- Cover artist: Craig White
- Language: English
- Series: Daybreak
- Genre: Science fiction
- Publisher: Ace Hardcover
- Publication date: 2013
- Publication place: United States
- Media type: Print (Hardcover )
- Pages: 386
- ISBN: 9781937007157
- Preceded by: Daybreak Zero

The Last President is a science fiction novel by American writer John Barnes. It is the third of the three books constituting the Daybreak series.

== Plot ==
In 2025 and 2026, after the Gaia-worshipping but environmentally destructive "Daybreak" movement unleashed a nanotech plague and nuclear and EMP attacks, the population of Earth has been greatly reduced and forced back to 19th-century or earlier technology. Two regions, one with its capital in Seattle, Washington and the other with its capital in Athens, Georgia, claim to be continuing the government of the U.S., while semi-independent regions around New York (increasingly fascist), in California (feudal), in Colorado (ostensibly neutral and dedicated to research and communications) and in Texas have some desire to participate in a restored U.S. Much of the Northeast is inhabited by "tribals" who have been mysteriously brainwashed into "Daybreak", but in one of their strongholds, Lord Robert is breaking away from the movement.

Despite tensions between the secularist believers in human rights in the Northwest and the fundamentalist Christian theocrats in the South, most of the regions attempt coordinate in a military campaign against the tribals and build up to a Presidential election to reunify the country. However, it turns out that the leaders of those regions were tricked into the campaign by Daybreak because it unifies it with Lord Robert. The U.S. forces are defeated disastrously. One of the leaders in Colorado makes herself president for the sole purpose of dissolving the United States and resigning. She and other survivors of the reunification attempt find refuge in California and the West Indies, which may become centers of the drive to rebuild civilization.

== Reaction ==
Kirkus Reviews said, "There is a fair quota of action, often involving brave defenders attempting to resist ravening zombies in human-wave assaults. But again the cast of thousands, incessant scene shifts and sheer density of the narrative makes for tough going. Nevertheless, the story inches toward a conclusion." Linda Marie Schumacher of SFRevu described it as a "fun" book with "lots of surprises and insight".
