= Daybreak Zero =

2011 novel by John Barnes

- Author: John Barnes
- Cover artist: Craig White
- Language: English
- Series: Daybreak
- Genre: Science fiction
- Publisher: Ace Hardcover
- Publication date: 2011
- Publication place: United States
- Media type: Print (Hardcover )
- Preceded by: Directive 51
- Followed by: The Last President

Daybreak Zero is the title of a science fiction novel by American writer John Barnes. It is the second of three books comprising the Daybreak series.

== Plot ==
In the near future, a variety of groups with diverse aims, but an overlapping desire to end modern technological society (the "Big System") create a nanotech plague ("Daybreak") which both destroys rubber and plastics and eats away any metal conductors carrying electricity. An open question in the book is whether these groups, and their shared motivation, are coordinated by some conscious actor, or whether they are an emergent property / meme that attained a critical mass.

== Reception ==
In a review of the audiobook, which was read by Susan Ericksen, AudioFile stated that her "attempts to capture atmosphere do not quite work" and that she "makes sense of the narrative but delivers it with a brittle intensity—even during the more personal and intimate moments." Kirkus Reviews wrote: "A stunning premise that would have benefited from a lighter approach, less baggage and more focus."
