= Finity =

1999 science fiction novel by John Barnes

- First edition cover
- Author: John Barnes
- Language: English
- Genre: Science fiction, alternate history
- Publisher: Tor Books
- Publication date: 1999
- Publication place: United States
- Media type: Print (hardcover and paperback)
- Pages: 303
- ISBN: 0-312-86118-4

Finity is a 1999 science fiction novel by American writer John Barnes. The novel combines elements of alternate history and hard science fiction, exploring multiple realities shaped by divergent historical outcomes and informed by concepts from quantum mechanics. Central to the plot is a mission to uncover the fate of the United States, which has been mysteriously erased or rendered inaccessible within the structure of reality.

== Publication history ==
Finity was first published in 1999 by Tor Books in the United States, with subsequent editions released in both hardcover and paperback formats. A UK edition was published by Gollancz in 2000.

== Plot ==
The novel is set in a dystopian future world of 2062, dominated by successor states of a victorious Axis alliance (the Japanese Empire and Eleven Reichs), in which Nazi Germany won the Second World War, an outcome which led, among others, to the extermination of all African Americans. The protagonist, Dr. Lyle Peripart is an astronomer and an American expat in still-sovereign New Zealand. However, his understanding of the world begins to unravel as he encounters individuals whose memories and experiences seem to originate from different historical timelines. The narrative gradually shifts from a puzzle about parallel worlds into a quest centered on the disappearance of the United States. In the novel's setting, the US is largely absent from global reality, and even thinking about it causes physical and cognitive disruption, including headaches and memory loss. As the narrative progresses, Peripart becomes involved in events that reveal the existence of multiple alternate realities. These realities intersect and conflict, causing increasing instability in the world he inhabits. The story follows his attempts to understand the underlying structure of these divergent histories and the forces shaping them, as the social and political order around him collapses into chaos.

== Analysis and themes ==
Finity explores the concepts of parallel worlds and alternate histories through the lens of modern physics, particularly interpretations of quantum mechanics such as the Copenhagen interpretation. The novel examines how different historical outcomes—such as variations on twentieth-century geopolitical events—can coexist and interact.

The narrative also addresses the relationship between scientific theory and lived experience, using speculative physics to explain and organize the complex structure of its multiple realities. In doing so, the novel engages with earlier science fiction treatments of alternate worlds, drawing on and reinterpreting established genre conventions. A central conceptual element in Finity is the use of abductive reasoning (or "abduction"), a form of logical inference associated with the philosopher Charles Sanders Peirce. The protagonist, Lyle Peripart, is depicted as a theorist of abduction, and this framework is used within the narrative to structure the process by which characters interpret and respond to the destabilizing presence of multiple realities. The novel combines this philosophical approach with the science fiction trope of parallel worlds, presenting a setting in which alternative histories coexist and intersect with the narrative suggesting that reality is shaped by the selection of plausible possibilities from an infinite set of alternatives. Other themes explored involve memory alteration, and epistemological uncertainty - i.e. what can be known about reality.

Damien Broderick have situated Finity within a tradition of late twentieth-century science fiction that revisits and recombines earlier genre motifs, particularly those associated with the many-worlds interpretation and parallel-history narratives. He considered it inspired by Fritz Leiber's The Big Time and Keith Laumer's Worlds of the Imperium, which similarly explore conflicts across alternate realities. Meanwhile, Duncan Lawie saw the book as highly influenced by Philip K. Dick's The Man In The High Castle and Ubik, as well as Frederik Pohl's The Coming of the Quantum Cats. Russell Letson noted that the similarity to Barnes previous works, in particular, his Timeline Wars books.

Gary K. Wolfe situated Finity within a tradition of SF narratives about a lost or rediscovered America, seeing similarities to Beyond Thirty by Edgar Rice Burroughs and Hello America by J. G. Ballard.

The narrative's progression relies heavily on gradual exposition of the portrayed reality, with the plot advancing through the expected mixture of dialogue, problem solving, action sequences, and speculative exposition, such as scenes of espionage, chase and pursuit, including encounters with agents aligned with competing interests.

== Reception ==
A review in The Zone by Duncan Lawie praised the book for its intellectual ambition and treatment of scientific ideas, in particular the synthesis of speculative physics and alternate history, noting that its use of quantum physics concepts was both central to the narrative, and well executed, noting that the scientific theory was clearly explained. Lawie highlighted the clarity of exposition as a major strength, particularly given the complexity of the subject matter. However, the reviewer found fault with the characters, which he saw as just functional rather than properly developed, although he opined that the protagonist remains a believable central figure, and supporting characters are sufficiently differentiated. Regarding the plot, he found it well executed, with good pacing and structure, and balance between exposition, action, and resolution not detracting from its intricate premise. Overall, Finity was characterized as a rewarding if intellectually demanding.

Damien Broderick reviewed the work for The New York Review of Science Fiction (it was reprinted in his book X, Y, Z, T: Dimensions of Science Fiction). He praised the novel's readability, its moments of humor and engagement, its intellectual playfulness and its effective use of speculative concepts, particularly its integration of philosophical ideas such as abductive reasoning into a science fiction framework, but noted that its conceptual scope exceeds the emotional or dramatic impact of its plot. He also opined that the novel relies heavily on established genre formulas, describing it as a competent but not groundbreaking work, seeing Finity as more of a recombination rather than innovation in the genre.

The book received two reviews in Locus; one by Gary K. Wolfe and another by Russell Letson. Wolfe characterized Finity as an "adventure of ideas", praising its inventive use of virtual reality and parallel-world concepts and its engagement with philosophical themes. He noted that the novel is driven by characters who actively engage with abstract ideas, a feature he described as increasingly rare in contemporary science fiction. At the same time, Wolfe identified structural weaknesses, particularly uneven exposition and a relatively thin plot, finding that extended explanatory passages occasionally disrupt the narrative flow, even as they contribute to the novel's intellectual ambitions. Despite these criticisms, he regarded the work as a notable example of idea-driven science fiction, concluding that despite a thin plot, "it is a fine example of what is becoming a rarity in SF or anywhere else: a genuine adventure of ideas, set in a world that is the pure product of ideas, and driven by characters who actually seem to think about ideas." Letson, meanwhile, praises Barnes's worldbuilding and conceptual ambition, noting the effective depiction of a Reich-dominated global order and the integration of familiar science fiction elements (AI, VR networks, advanced transport) with an alternate-history framework. He sees the work as relatively dark and unsettling, even if it has segments he considers playful. He found some fault with the structure, suggesting that attentive readers may anticipate key revelations before the characters do, and that the resolution is somewhat telegraphed. Nevertheless, he concludes that Barnes successfully blends intellectual speculation with genre storytelling, opining that "even in light entertainment/adeventure-tale mode, Barnes can conjure sweaty dreams that make you glad that you're reading about them and not living them".

Mark L. Olson reviewed the book for Aboriginal Science Fiction. He called the book "another fine piece of work" from Barnes, whom he considers "one of the top half-dozen SF authors writing today". He noted that although the "book has a good enough puzzle to be worth keeping spoilers to a minimum", the [complicated] explanation for all the strangeness [is] a bit on the weak side", and awarded the book a score of 3.5 out of 5.

Other reviews:

- Review by Curt Wohleber (1999) in Science Fiction Weekly, 1 March 1999
- Review by Tom Easton (1999) in Analog Science Fiction and Fact, July-August 1999
- Review by John D. Owen (2000) in Vector 211
