= Mother of Storms =

1994 novel by John Barnes

- First edition
- Author: John Barnes
- Cover artist: Bob Eggleton
- Language: English
- Genre: Science fiction
- Publisher: Tor
- Publication date: July 1994
- Publication place: United States
- Media type: Print (Hardcover)
- Pages: 432
- ISBN: 0-312-85560-5

Mother of Storms is a 1994 science fiction novel by American writer John Barnes. It was nominated for three major science fiction awards.

== Plot summary ==
In the early 21st century, the Earth suffers from a giant hurricane spawned by the release of clathrate compounds, as the result of a nuclear explosion. The hurricane spawns hundreds of progeny, which kill at least 1 billion people by the novel's end. Two massively computer-augmented human intelligences (both of whom witness their organic bodies die) race to corral a comet from beyond Pluto's orbit. They use the ice from the comet to reduce the Earth's surface temperatures, and quell the mother of storms.

The novel is written in the present tense, and jumps between the viewpoints of many characters, some of whom recur while others appear only once or twice.

== Scientific ideas referenced ==
The clathrate gun hypothesis is the basis for the origin of the hurricane.

== Award nominations ==
- 1995 – Locus Poll Award, Best Science Fiction Novel nominee
- 1995 – Arthur C. Clarke Award, shortlist
- 1995 – Hugo Award, Best Novel nominee
- 1996 – Nebula Award, Best Novel nominee

== Translations ==
- French
  - La Mère des Tempêtes, translated by Jean-Daniel Brèque. Le Livre de Poche (2001), ISBN 2-253-07235-4
- Romanian
  - Uraganele, translated by Gabriel Stoian. Editura Nemira (1999)
