= The Return (Aldrin and Barnes novel) =

2000 novel by Buzz Aldrin and John Barnes

- First edition cover
- Author: Buzz Aldrin and John Barnes
- Publisher: Tor Books
- Publication date: May 2000
- ISBN: 978-0-312-87424-7

The Return is a 2000 novel written by American astronaut Buzz Aldrin and American science fiction writer John Barnes. The book details a fictional account of the future of space travel, specifically space tourism. Although set in the near future, it now seems somewhat dated as events that happened shortly after its release, such as the Columbia disaster and recent space tourism advances such as SpaceShipOne and Virgin Galactic, are not included. Most of the corporations within the novel have fictional names; however, it is often quite clear that they are references to real corporations such as Boeing, Lockheed Martin, and Nike. Overall, the book heavily supports the view that tourism is needed to drive the space industry.

== Plot summary ==
The book starts by detailing a corporation that works to send people to space by booking them on empty seats on Space Shuttle flights. The third such flight is preparing to launch, carrying retired basketball player MJ (a character closely resembling Michael Jordan) into space.

However, during the flight something goes wrong and MJ and a mission specialist die, while the rest of the crew is forced to make an emergency landing. Initially almost everyone in the space industry is sued over MJ's death, although most of the charges are later dropped when it is discovered that the explosion was the result of a Chinese attempt to take down the Space Shuttle. China is also found to be responsible for a high altitude nuclear weapon that Pakistan set off. The purpose of this bomb was to wipe out the current network of satellites, apparently in an attempt to cash in with their new presence in space exploration. The bomb also leaves the International Space Station heavily damaged.

The rest of the book chronicles a daring rescue attempt to save those still on board the ISS, using mostly theoretical prototype vehicles. The rescue is a success, and the whole crew returns as heroes.
