= Pierre Bec =

Occitan-language poet and linguist

Pierre Bec (French: [pjɛʁ bɛk]; Occitan: Pèire Bec, IPA: ['pɛjɾe βɛk]; 11 December 1921 – 30 June 2014) was a French Occitan-language poet and linguist. Born in Paris, he spent his childhood in Comminges, where he learnt Occitan. He was deported to Germany between 1943 and 1945. After returning, he studied in Paris, where he graduated in 1959. He was one of the founders of the IEO or Institut d'Estudis Occitans (Institute of Occitan Studies) as well as its president from 1962 to 1980.

== Life ==
Pierre Bec spent his childhood in Cazères-sur-Garonne where he learned Gascon. In 1938, he was an interpreter for the Spanish Republican refugees who had crossed the Pyrenees, and he discovered Catalan. He was deported in March 1943 to Germany as part of the compulsory labor service.

Bec was a titular professor at the University of Poitiers and assistant director of the Centre d'Études Supérieures de Civilisation Médiévale (Centre for high studies in medieval civilisation). He is considered one of the most important specialists in Occitan dialectology and in mediaeval Occitan literature. His activity is distributed among Occitanist politics, philological research and literary creation. He collaborated with publications like Cahiers de Civilisation Médiévale, Revue de Linguistique Romane, Estudis Romànics, Oc.

In 1982 he took part in the Linguistic Normalisation commission for Aranese, with Jacme Taupiac and Miquèu Grosclaude: they established some linguistics norms, officialised in 1983, following IEO's indications for Gascon.

Bec died in Poitiers on 30 June 2014, at the age of 92.

== Importance for Gallo-Cisalpine language(s) ==
As a linguist, Pierre Bec stated, within his Manuel pratique de Philologie romane (2nd volume, p. 316) that some kind of diachronical unity holds between Rhaeto-Romance languages (i.e. Romansh, Friulian and Ladin) and Northern Italian or Cisalpine ones (Western Lombard, Eastern Lombard, Piedmontese, Venetan, Emiliano-Romagnolo and Ligurian). This issue has been further investigated by the Australian linguist Geoffrey Hull.

== Works ==
=== Literature ===
- Petite anthologie de la lyrique occitane du Moyen Âge (1954)
- Les saluts d'amour du troubadour Arnaud de Mareuil (1961) (editor)
- La langue occitane (1963)
- Burlesque et obscénité chez les troubadours (1984)
- Chants d'amour des femmes troubadours (1995) (Anthologist)
- Au briu de l'estona (1955) poetry
- Sonets barròcs entà Iseut (1979) poetry
- Lo hiu tibat (1978) Novel
- Sebastian (1980) Novel
- Raconte d’una mort tranquilla (1993) Short Story
- Contes de l'unic (1977) Short Story

=== Linguistics ===
- Manuel pratique d'occitan moderne (Picard, 1973; 2e édition 1983)
- Manuel pratique de philologie romane (Picard, 1970 (vol. 1), 1971 (vol. 2) - reedit. 2000)
- Les Interférences linguistiques entre gascon et languedocien dans les parlers du Comminges et du Couserans (PUF, 1968): Essai d'aréologie systématique.

== See also ==
- Occitan language
- Aranese
- Gallo-Italic languages
