= Directive 51 (novel) =

2010 novel by John Barnes

- Author: John Barnes
- Cover artist: Craig White
- Language: English
- Series: Daybreak
- Genre: Science fiction
- Publisher: Ace Hardcover
- Publication date: 2010
- Publication place: United States
- Media type: Print (Hardcover)
- Followed by: Daybreak Zero

Directive 51 is a science fiction novel by American writer John Barnes. It is the first of three books collectively entitled the Daybreak series. The title is a reference to Directive 51, the Presidential directive setting out government procedures in the event of a "catastrophic emergency".

== Plot ==
In the near future, Heather O'Grainn is a worker in the Office of Future Threat Assessment in Washington state. A variety of groups with diverse aims, but an overlapping desire to end modern technological society (which they call the Big System), create a nanotech plague ("Daybreak") which both destroys petroleum-based fuels, rubber and plastics and eats away any metal conductors carrying electricity. An open question in the book is whether these groups, and their shared motivations, are coordinated by some conscious actor, or whether they are an emergent property / meme that attained a critical mass.

The Daybreak plague strikes, and world governments are helpless to deal with it. Industrial civilization rapidly breaks down, and tens of millions die in the U.S. alone (the global death toll measures in the billions). There is a presidential succession crisis. Just as society in the U.S. seems to start stabilizing, previously placed pure fusion weapons detonate, destroying Washington, D.C. and Chicago. This is followed by additional pure fusion weapon strikes, which are determined to be weapons that are being created on the Moon by nanotech replicators. A shadowy neofeudalist group (the "Castle movement") led by a reactionary billionaire may be inadvertent saviors of society... or may have some deeper involvement in things.

== Reception ==
Publishers Weekly called it a "sprawling and provocative apocalyptic epic". Russell Letson Locus called it "one of the most absorbing" novels he had read that year and that the title alludes to a "hard-SF-style treatment of some notions that in other hands might have been just literalized metaphors, but that here become frighteningly concrete." Kelly Jennings of Strange Horizons wrote: "The strengths of the book—including its large cast, political intrigue, ideas, sense of landscape and pace—are many. With a bit more balance, I think Directive 51 could have been an excellent book. As it stands, it's just a pretty good one."
