= The Merchants of Souls =

2001 novel by John Barnes

- First edition
- Author: John Barnes
- Language: English
- Series: Thousand Cultures series
- Genre: Science fiction
- Publisher: Tor Books
- Publication date: November 2001
- Publication place: United States
- Media type: Print (hardback & paperback)
- ISBN: 0-7653-0330-2
- OCLC: 60799717
- Dewey Decimal: 813/.54 22
- LC Class: PS3552.A677 A89 2006
- Followed by: The Armies of Memory

The Merchants of Souls is a 2001 science fiction novel by American writer John Barnes, the third book in the Thousand Cultures series.

== Summary ==
The book follows Giraut Leones, a special agent who has been betrayed by those he thought he could trust. He has sworn off of working for the Office of Special Projects but is drawn back after discovering that a group has begun recording the personalities of the deceased and is using them for their own entertainment. This is considered an affront to Leones and many of the peoples of the Thousand Cultures, threatening to break the fragile balance in place.

== Reception ==
Critical reception for The Merchants of Souls was mixed, with the Orlando Sentinel giving it a positive review while Publishers Weekly panned the novel. Kirkus Reviews also gave a mixed review, stating that it was a "Soporifically plotted story of ideas that, despite some sly social satire, gets lost in interminable talk about human identity, truth, and memory." In contrast, Locus Online named it one of their recommended reads of 2001 for science fiction novels and nominated it for a 2002 Locus Award.

== See also ==
- Interstellar teleporter
- Tunnel in the Sky
- Gridlinked
