= John Barnes (author) =

American science fiction author (born 1957)

- Born: 1957 (age 68–69); Angola, Indiana, U.S.
- Education: Washington University in St. Louis (BA); University of Montana (MA); University of Pittsburgh (PhD)
- Occupation: Author
- Writing career
- Genre: Science fiction

John Barnes (born 1957) is an American science fiction author.

== Writing ==
Two of his novels, The Sky So Big and Black and The Duke of Uranium have been reviewed as having content appropriate for a young adult readership, comparing favorably to Robert A. Heinlein's "juvenile" novels. He has contributed to the Internet Evolution website.

== Technical career ==
Barnes has done work in systems analysis, business statistics, software reliability theory, sentiment analysis, statistical semiotics, and formal specification.

== Personal life ==
Barnes's hometown is Bowling Green, Ohio. Barnes earned a B.A. degree from Washington University in St. Louis, an M.A. degree from the University of Montana, and a Ph.D. degree in theater from the University of Pittsburgh. He has taught at Western State College. He lives in Colorado. Barnes has been married three times and divorced twice.

== Bibliography ==
=== Century Next Door series ===
- Orbital Resonance (1991)
- Kaleidoscope Century (1995)
- Candle (2000)
- The Sky So Big and Black (2002)

=== Thousand Cultures series ===
The four novels in the Thousand Cultures series include the theme of the effects of globalization, at an interstellar scale, on isolated societies.

- A Million Open Doors (1992)
- Earth Made of Glass (1998)
- The Merchants of Souls (2001)
- The Armies of Memory (2006)

=== Time Raider series ===
- Wartide (1992)
- Battle Cry (1992)
- Union Fires (1992)

=== Timeline Wars series ===
- Patton's Spaceship (1997)
- Washington's Dirigible (1997)
- Caesar's Bicycle (1997)
- Timeline Wars (1997) (omnibus volume)
- "Upon Their Backs, to Bite 'Em" (2000) (a crossover story included in Drakas!)

=== Jak Jinnaka series ===
- Duke of Uranium (2002)
- A Princess of the Aerie (2003)
- In the Hall of the Martian King (2003)

=== Daybreak series ===
- Directive 51 (2010)
- Daybreak Zero (2011)
- The Last President (2014)

The Last President was originally scheduled for 2012, but was delayed due to disagreements between Barnes and the publisher over the direction the series was taking. The final book in the series was published by Ace in 2014. Barnes is considering re-writing the first two books to make them more consistent with his original conception of the series.

=== Other books ===
- The Man Who Pulled Down the Sky (1987)
- Sin of Origin (1988)
- Mother of Storms (1994)
- Encounter With Tiber (with Buzz Aldrin (1996)
- One For the Morning Glory (1996)
- 'Apocalypses and Apostrophes' (1998) (a short story collection also published as Apostrophes and Apocalypses)
- Finity (1999)
- The Return, with Buzz Aldrin (2001)
- Gaudeamus (2004) (meta-referential work blending fiction and reality)
- Payback City (2007) (thriller, written in 1997, self-published e-book)
- Tales of the Madman Underground: An Historical Romance, 1973 (2009) (YA/non-SF, a Michael L. Printz Award Honor Book)
- Losers in Space (2012) (YA/SF)
- Raise the Gipper! (2012) (SF/fantasy/political satire)

=== Short fiction ===
- "The Birds and the Bees and the Gasoline Trees" (2010) (short story, in Engineering Infinity, edited by Jonathan Strahan)

== Awards ==
- Nebula Award Best Novel nominee (1992) : Orbital Resonance
- Nebula Award Best Novel nominee (1993) : A Million Open Doors
- Hugo Award Best Novel nominee (1995) : Mother of Storms
- Nebula Award Best Novel nominee (1996) : Mother of Storms
- Michael L. Printz Award Honor Book (2010): Tales of the Madman Underground: An Historical Romance 1973

== See also ==
- One True, fictional artificial intelligence central to the Century Next Door series.
