= The Armies of Memory =

2006 novel by John Barnes

- Author: John Barnes
- Language: English
- Series: Thousand Cultures series
- Genre: Science fiction novel
- Publisher: Tor Books
- Publication date: April 2006
- Publication place: United States
- Media type: Print (hardback & paperback)
- ISBN: 0-7653-0330-2
- OCLC: 60799717
- Dewey Decimal: 813/.54 22
- LC Class: PS3552.A677 A89 2006

The Armies of Memory (2006) is a science fiction novel by American writer John Barnes, the fourth book of his Thousand Cultures series. The story is told from the perspective of a middle-aged special agent named Giraut. The Armies of Memory explores the intermingling of artificial and human intelligence as an alien threat is on the horizon.

== Plot summary ==
Several attempts are made on Giraut's life as he works on his new Ix cycle of music. He is sent back to Wilson, his home planet and culture of Occitan, to complete the new music along with his Office of Special Projects (OSP) team as protection. Paxa retires from the OSP and leaves Giraut after finding out she cannot be successfully backed up on a psypyx, which would make her death permanent. Giraut begins to fall in love with a fellow musician Azalais who introduces him to Ebles, a contact for rogue colonies outside of Council space which call themselves the Union. Soon after, Azalais is killed and Giraut is severely injured in another assassination attempt.

After Giraut is healed he is contacted again by Union. Margaret sends him, along with Raimbaut and Laprada, to the rogue Union colony of Noucatharia to get to the bottom of several coincidences, including the whereabouts of a possible psypyx of Shan, and to find out who keeps trying to kill him. Once there Giraut begins to fall in love with Rielis, a talented musician and singer, as he tries to uncover what Union wants from him and the council. It is revealed to Giraut and his team that everyone on Noucatharia is either an aintellect in human form or a chimera human/aintellect, both of which are forbidden horrors in Council space. They are also told there are multiple aintellect conspiracies unknown to the OSP, and that Noucatharia was the site of the first invasion by an unknown Alien army, in which humans were beheaded and aintellects/robots fought as best they could. After another amateurish assassination attempt he is kidnapped, separated from his team, and implanted with Shan's psypyx.

As Rielis questions Shan, Giraut and Rielis rapidly come to know what happened on Addams to cause it to lose contact with Earth. An aggressive alien aintellect-run invasion overwhelmed their defenses and killed everyone not in hiding—their goal being to destructively holograph brains, deconstruct aintellects and send back those memories and experiences to their home planet to be consumed as entertainment for their dependent organic creators who had isolated themselves in virtual reality. Only by advanced planning by Shan's father and help from his personal aintellect was a very young Shan able to escape via springer to Earth.

The OSP invades Noucatharia with help from Raimbaut just as Giraut/Shan and Rielis are beginning to agree on the cooperation that is needed between the Council and the Union to face the alien threat. Giraut/Shan are held prisoner by Margaret until the OSP can sort out friend from foe, but Paxa comes through a springer to free Giraut. He quickly recognizes that Paxa is joined to Azalais as a chimera in exchange for being able to be psypyxed in the future, and to help the progressive and dynamic Union face an alien threat. Giraut/Shan and Paxa/Azalais mount a rescue mission and free the aintellect humans and chimeras from OSP control and get Raimbaut to join them.

Raimbaut and Giraut/Shan then choose to stay behind in an attempt to rescue or destroy a Rielis psypyx from an OSP building before it can be tortured for its knowledge and secrets. They destroy the psypyx and Margaret captures them before they can make it to a springer. Raimbaut is quickly cleared of charges and Shan is eventually implanted in Margaret's brain—but Giraut is found guilty of assisting the aintellect conspiracies in escaping from Noucatharia. His trial is a rallying cry for human supremacists, but over time and as the facts come out they are increasingly marginalized by society who see Giraut as a martyr. The only thing left is for him to be executed to permit his public beheading to serve as a unifying story for future generations, as contact is made with the aintellect-run Union colonies.

== Reception ==
Publishers Weekly stated: "Rich with glowing resonances of medieval Languedoc, the inspiration for Barnes's convincing Nou Occitan milieu and language, this final chorale of a long and brilliant SF symphony reprises some of his most intriguing characters". Kirkus Reviews wrote: "Still top-heavy with cultural referents, but thoughtful, well plotted and intriguingly populated—the best so far in a worthwhile series." Roland Green of Booklist called the novel "vastly underrated" and opined that it was written in a "graceful, fluid manner that considerably surpasses the level of writing in, say, most current mainstream thrillers".

== See also ==
- Interstellar teleporter
- Tunnel in the Sky
- Gridlinked
