= Teleportation in fiction =

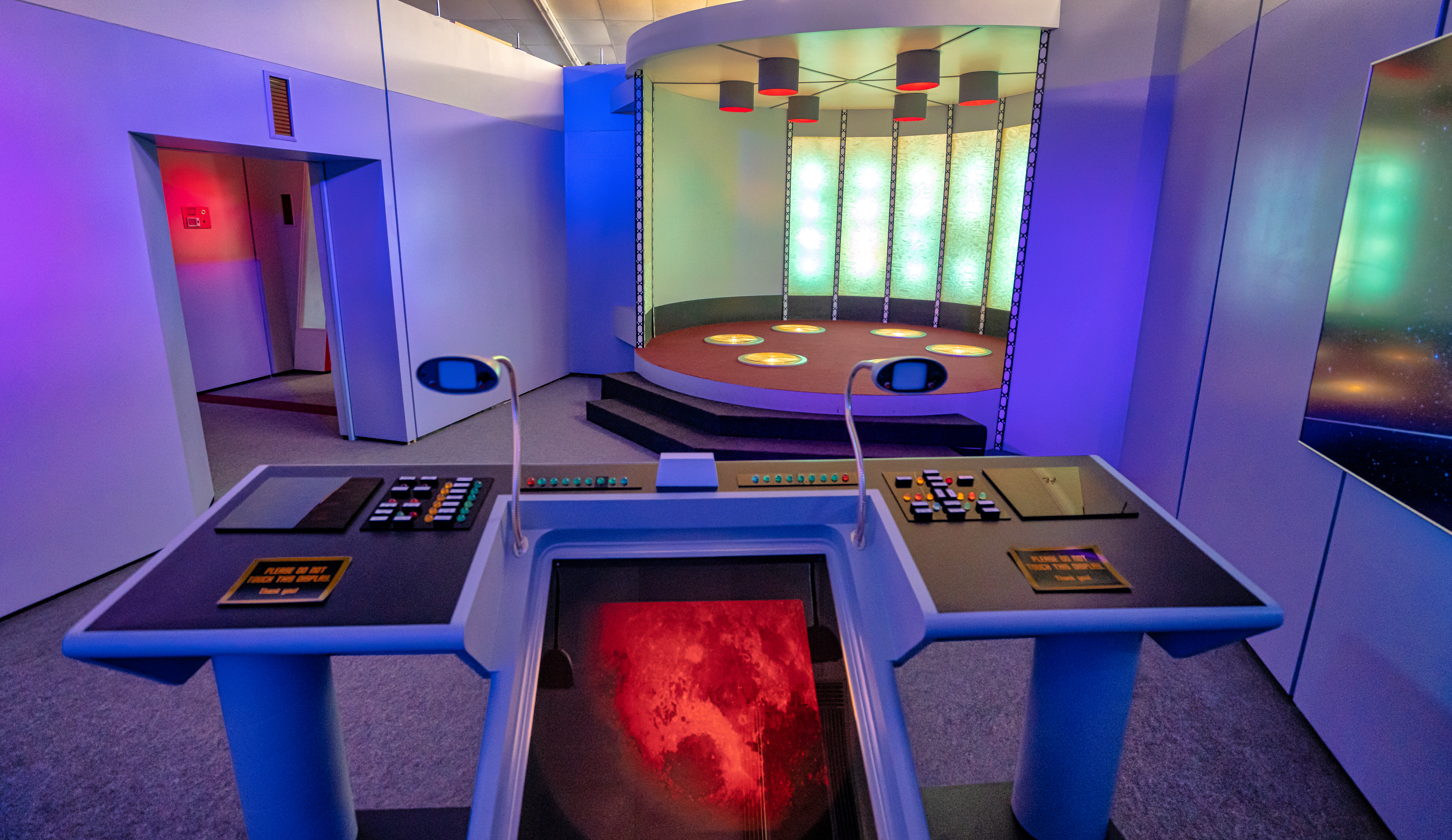
A mockup of the transporter room from Star Trek: The Original Series

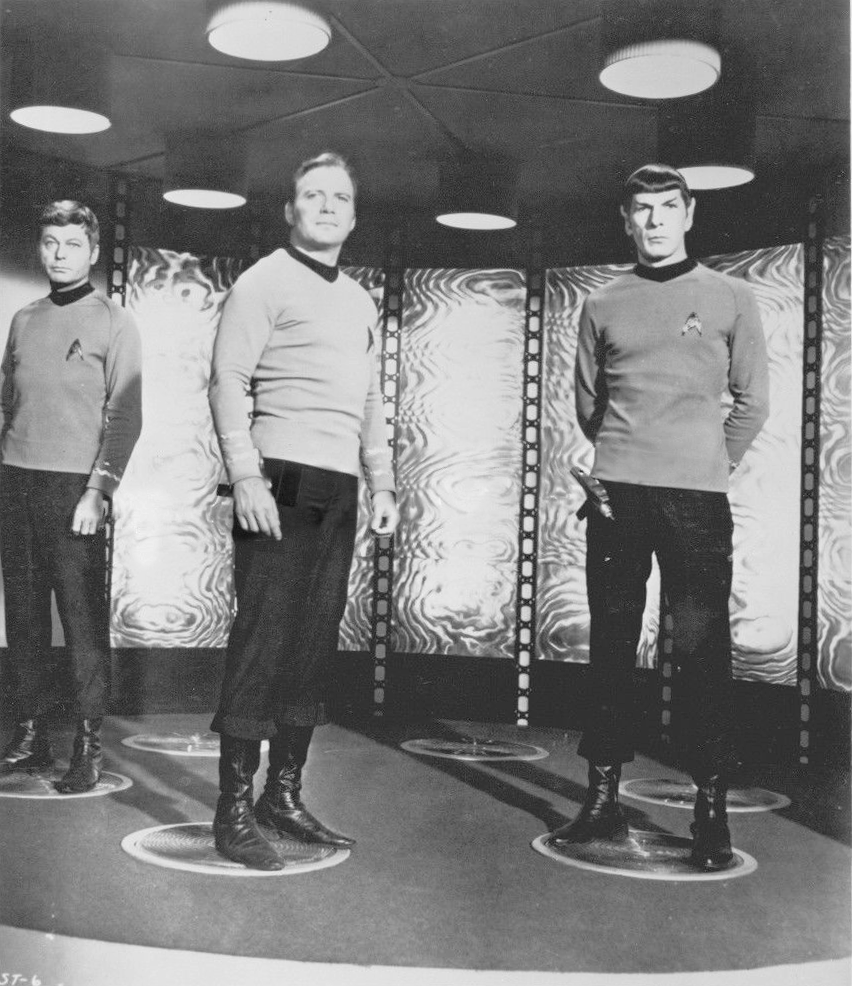
McCoy, Kirk and Spock in the Star Trek transporter room

Teleportation is the theoretical transfer of matter or energy from one point to another without traversing the physical space between them. It is a common subject in science fiction and fantasy literature, film, video games, and television. In some situations, teleporting is presented as time traveling across space.

The use of matter transmitters in science fiction originated at least as early as the 19th century. An early example of scientific teleportation (as opposed to magical or spiritual teleportation) is found in the 1897 novel To Venus in Five Seconds by Fred T. Jane. Jane's protagonist is transported from a strange-machinery-containing gazebo on Earth to planet Venus.

A common fictional device for teleportation is a "wormhole". In video games, the instant teleportation of a player character may be referred to as a warp.

== List of fiction containing teleportation ==
=== Multiple media types ===
- Nearly every entry in the Star Trek franchise features a transporter system of some type to various levels of prominence.

=== Written fiction ===
- William Shakespeare invoked a concept resembling teleportation in The Tempest (1610–1611).
- Edward Page Mitchell's 1877 story The Man Without a Body details the efforts of a scientist who discovers a method to disassemble a cat's atoms, transmit them over a telegraph wire, and then reassemble them. When he tries this on himself, the telegraph's battery dies after only his head has been transmitted.
- "Travel by Wire!" is a science fiction short story by English writer Arthur C. Clarke. His first published story, it was first published in December 1937. This story is a humorous record on the development of the "radio-transporter" (actually a teleportation machine), and the various technical difficulties and commercial ventures that resulted.
- In Alfred Bester's 1956 novel The Stars My Destination, psionic displacement/teleportation has become commonplace. This story is the origin of the term jaunt in the sense of personal teleportation (spelled "jaunte" in the book, from the surname, "Jaunte", of the first person to do so).
- "The Jaunt" is a horror short story by Stephen King first published in 1981. In the story teleportation is commonplace with the "Jaunting" technology (the term is a homage to Bester's earlier novel). It revolves around a family going on a business trip with the Jaunt and the dire consequences when the procedure goes wrong.
- Anne McCaffrey's Dragonriders of Pern series features dragons that can teleport themselves, their bonded riders and any passengers or cargo they may be carrying anywhere their rider can visualize clearly enough.

=== Television ===
- In Buck Rogers (1939) the "elevator" is explained as "by radioactivity it breaks down the atoms of the body to their component parts and reversing polarity reassembles them wherever desired"
- Star Trek: The Original Series (1966–1969) established the "transporter beam" as a means of landing personnel on a planet. Despite popular belief, Captain Kirk never actually said, "Beam me up, Scotty!" in those exact words.
- In the ITV 1970s children's sci-fi series The Tomorrow People and its Nickelodeon remake, a group of teenagers have the ability of psychic teleportation. This was referred to as "jaunting" as in Bester's novel.
- In the BBC 1970s sci-fi series Blake's 7, one or more crew members can be teleported in the teleportation bay onboard the Liberator Spaceship. A teleport bracelet is required, and without one teleportation is impossible.
- The Transformers introduced a character named Skywarp who was capable of teleporting from place to place. Transformers also utilize a device called a "Space Bridge" to travel, usually from Cybertron to a planet in another solar system. Some Transformers like the Transformers: Revenge of the Fallen iteration of Jetfire carry onboard Space Bridges.
- In the Kidsongs 1991 video "Very Silly Songs", the Kidsongs Kids and their silly adult friends, Willy and Jilly, say the magic words "One and a two and a bop bam boom!" to teleport themselves from one place of Silly-Dillyville to another.
- In the show Once Upon a Time, magic users have the ability to teleport themselves and others in clouds of magical smoke.

=== Films ===
- The 1958 film The Fly and its 1986 remake involve a scientist who invents a teleportation process and tests it on himself, unaware that a fly is in the teleporter pod with him.
- The 1976 film Logan's Run features a teleportation network called "the circuit", which is used to bring people together for casual sex.
- Doctor Manhattan frequently teleports in the 2009 film Watchmen in one scene to the planet Mars.

=== Comics ===
- The Dan Dare adventures in the Eagle used a "telesender", originally invented by the Treens. A running joke was that Dan Dare's assistant Digby always arrived upside down. Its first appearance was in Voyage to Venus, published in 1950.
- The Marvel comic books feature many mutants and other characters with teleportation powers, such as Azazel, Nightcrawler, Magik, Locus, Lila Cheney, Amanda Sefton, Madelyne Pryor, Blink, The Wink, Paragon, Silver Samurai, and Eden Fesi. The character Spot can open holes he can teleport himself or even parts of himself through.

=== Video games ===
Teleportation as a game mechanic is common across various genres of video games, generally referred to as warps. Player characters in games may sometimes be transported instantly between game areas, for example. Such warp mechanics can be incorporated into the world as science-fiction or fantasy elements, or might function as a timeskip during relatively uninteresting travel time. From a player's perspective, such a timeskip can be experienced as teleportation.

== See also ==
- Portable hole
- Technology in science fiction
- Portal fantasy
