= West African mythology =

West African mythology is the body of myths of the people of West Africa. It consists of tales of various deities, beings, legendary creatures, heroes and folktales from various ethnic groups. Some of these myths traveled across the Atlantic during the period of the Trans-Atlantic slave trade to become part of Caribbean, African-American and Brazilian mythology.

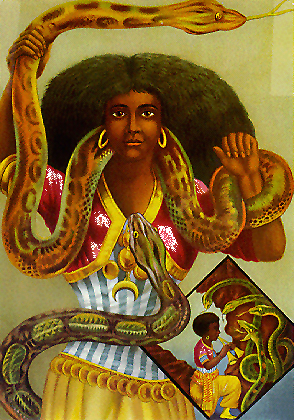
Mami Wata, a prominent figure from West African mythology

Written myths from West Africa were not established until the 1800s. Most myths were passed from one generation to another orally. These myths were told by storytellers and grandparents. It is also told by griots in Mali and Senegal, Niger and northern Nigeria. Elements and figures of West African mythology might sometimes be regarded as part of West Africa Traditional religion.

== By country ==
=== Benin ===
Mythology from Benin mostly comes from Dahomey. Several gods exist in the Dahomean Religion, with each having its own mythology. Myths of the Fon and Ewe people feature Aziza, fairy like creatures who live in the forest. According to legend, they provide good magic for hunters, and are also known to have given practical and spiritual knowledge to people. Common descriptions of Aziza people state that they are hairy people, and are said to live in anthills and silk-cotton trees.

=== Gambia ===
In the Gambia, most folklore proposes the existence of Ninki Nanka; descriptions of this creature vary, but most contend that the animal is reptilian and is either a dragon or dragon-like. The Ninki Nanka lives in the swamps. It attracted mainstream attention when in 2006, a group of "dragon hunters" from the Centre for Fortean Zoology (CFZ) went to Gambia to investigate the Ninki Nanka and take testimony from those who have claimed to have seen the mythical creature.

=== Ghana ===
In the Ewe folklore of Togo and Ghana, the Adze is a vampiric being that takes the form of a firefly, though it will transform into human shape upon capture. When in human form, the adze has the power to possess humans. In firefly form, the adze would pass through closed doors at night and suck blood from people as they slept. The victim would later fall sick and die.

A similar mythology from the Akan people of southern Ghana, as well as Côte d'Ivoire, Togo and 18th century Jamaica features creatures called Asasabonsam. These are vampire like beings who live in the forest and feed on people that wander around their home. An Asasabonsam is said to have iron teeth, pink skin, long red hair and iron hooks for feet. It lives in trees, attacking from above while in its humanoid form. It possesses bat-like features, including wings.

Obayifo is a vampire/witch-like mythological creature from the folklore of the Ashanti. In Ashanti folklore, obayifo are very common and may inhabit the bodies of any man or woman. They are described as having shifty eyes and being obsessed with food. When travelling at night, they are said to emit a phosphorescent light from their armpits and anus. The obayifo is similar to the Asiman of the Dahomey people, a creature that can shapeshift and fly, turning itself into a ball of light and hunting for prey in the night sky.

Anansi, a trickster spider god from the Akan mythology, is also prevalent. He is often depicted in folktales interacting with the Supreme Being and other deities who frequently bestow him with temporary supernatural powers, such as the ability to bring rain or to have other duties performed for him. Some folkloric traditions portray Anansi as the son of the Earth Mother Asase Yaa. In others, Anansi is sometimes also considered an Abosom (lesser deity) in Akan spirituality, despite being commonly recognized as a trickster.

=== Mali ===
Malian mythology comes from a variety of ethnicities; among the Dogon people, Nommos are usually described as amphibious, hermaphroditic, fish-like creatures. Folk art depictions of Nommos show creatures with humanoid upper torsos, legs/feet, and fish-like lower torsos and tails. Nommo are the first living creatures. According to Dogon Astrology, the Nommos were inhabitants of a world circling the star Sirius. The Nommos descended from the sky in a vessel accompanied by fire and thunder. After arriving, the Nommos created a reservoir of water and subsequently dove into the water. The Dogon legends state that the Nommos required a watery environment in which to live.

=== Niger ===
In Niger mythology, Hira is a mythical monster which occurs in epic and folklore tales of the Songhai people, particularly the Bozo people; its greatest opponent is Moussa Gname.

Zin are mythical water spirits that inhabit rivers and lakes in the mythology of the Songhai people, it is similar to the Zin Kibaru - a blind, river-dwelling spirit who commands fish.

=== Nigeria ===
The mythology of Nigeria is diverse because of the various ethnic groups that share the country. Elements of Yoruba mythology overlaps with Yoruba religion and include the Oriṣa, a pantheon of deities who are also venerated in the Candomble, Santeria, and Haitian Vodou religions in the African diaspora.

Another category of supernatural entity in Yoruba mythology is the Abiku, children from the spirit world who die before reaching puberty. Abiku also refers to the spirits which historically are said to inhabit trees.

Egbere are malevolent spirits that inhabit bushes and forests. They are seen at night. An Egbere is said to be short, own a small mat, and cry all the time. According to legend, anyone who takes the mat from it will become rich.

In the mythology of the Igbo people from southeast Nigeria, Ogbanje are evil spirits that are disguised as children, spirits who cause misfortune and grief. It was believed that within a certain amount of time from birth (usually before puberty), the ọgbanje would deliberately die and then be reborn into the next child of the family before then repeating the cycle, causing much grief. The evil spirits are said to have stones called Iyi-uwa, which they bury somewhere secret. The Iyi-uwa serves as a talisman for the ọgbanje to return to the human world and to find its targeted family; destroying the Iyi-uwa cuts the connection of the ogbanje and frees the family from the torment.

In northern Nigeria, among the Kanuri people of the Borno Emirate in the Lake Chad region, beliefs of a form of werehyenas referred to as bultungin which translates into "I change myself into a hyena" exist. It was once traditionally believed that one or two of the villages in the region was populated entirely by werehyenas, such as Kabultiloa.

Mami Wata are spirits or creatures that dwell in rivers and oceans. They are often described as mermaid-like figures, with a woman's upper body (often nude) and the hindquarters of a fish or serpent. In other tales, Mami Wata is fully human in appearance; though never human. The existence and spiritual importance of Mami Wata is deeply rooted in the ancient tradition and mythology of the coastal southern Nigeria. Mami Wata often carries expensive baubles such as combs, mirrors, and watches. Large snakes frequently accompany them, wrapping themselves around them and laying their heads between their breasts. Other times, a Mami Wata may try to pass as completely human, wandering through busy markets or patronising bars. She may also manifest in a number of other forms, including as a man.

Hausa mythology stems from the indigenous Bori religion in Hausa land. Dodo is a mythical monster or bogey most times believed to Inhabit baobab and tamarind trees. He is described as a giant and has very long hair, and a tail. He is capable of swallowing full humans and animals. Zankallala, is a tiny creature resembling a mouse, he carries a snake in his hand as a walking-stick, he wears a pair of scorpions as spurs, and a swarm of bees as a hat. He rides upon the jerboa, and flocks of birds attend him, to sing his praises, and to worry those with whom he fights. The zankallala is a folk hero who helps people attacked by Dodo.

In Efik mythology, Bush Soul is an integral component. It is commonly believed that a person's soul has affinity to animals. It was believed that every individual had a soul in an animal, could transfer their consciousness to the body of the animal and materialise as the animal. Children were taught never to kill a wall gecko (Efik: Ukpọñ Eyen). Whatever occurred to the animal-affinity also occurred to the human. There is a hierarchy of animals, the leopard being the highest followed by wild dogs, crocodiles, boa constrictors and other snakes as well as wall geckos Animals and some species of fish were regarded as potential affinities, but never plants, insects or rocks. The choice of the animal was made before birth and was influenced by Eka Abasi (The Mother God). A person's personality and behavioural characteristics were considered to be determined by the animal soul. A very slow person possessed the python as his animal-affinity while a filthy person had a pig affinity, A strong, healthy individual possessed either a crocodile or spitting cobra and the affinity of one who had many white discolorations on the skin was thought to be a species of lizard called owuri; such people had the ability to draw money to themselves at night when the lizard howled. If an Individual craved oil palm fruits he possessed either a monkey affinity or that of a fish called ɔfɔt. A very powerful Individual has the animal affinity of a chimpanzee.

Tortoises (Yoruba: Ijapa, Igbo: Mbeku) are also part of Nigerian mythology, as they are considered to be tricksters and feature heavily in folklore of southern Nigeria while the hare (Hausa: Zomo) and Spider (Hausa: Gizzo) features heavily in northern Nigeria.

=== Senegal ===
In the mythology of the Wolof people and Lebou people, Yumboes are supernatural beings who closely resemble European fairies. They are also called Bakhna Rakhna, which literally means good people. They are completely of a pearly-white colour. They are sometimes said to have silver hair. They stand about two feet tall.

The Yumboes live beneath the Paps hills and come out to dance in the moonlight. They feast on large tables, waited on by servants who are invisible except for their hands and feet. Yumboes eat corn, which they steal from the humans and fish. They invite both natives and foreigners to their feast.

=== Togo ===
The mythology of the Ewé, Fon, Aja, Gun, Kotafon, and Mina often features supernatural beings who influence everyday life. These mawu (small gods) are considered messengers who communicate with the great Mawu. Some of these supernatural spirits are the incarnation of ancestors. One of the supernatural spirits is mamiwater with papywater; these spirits control the sea in the right side (justice before Mawugan). Another supernatural spirit in south Togo is Sakpata, the spirit of the land.

== Folktales ==
- The Scarecrow: This story is about a family of spiders who lived on a farm. Their names were Anaanu (the father), Kornorley (the mother) and Kwakute (the son). Anaanu brought his family together and let them know he was going to die soon. He wished to be put into a coffin that was not nailed down and placed in the middle of the yam farm with a bowl and spoon. Anaanu died within a few days, and his family did just what he had asked. When his family would come visit every day, they noticed their yams were disappearing. Anaanu would get out of his coffin and eat the yams, then lay back down. Anaanu's son, Kwakute, got tired of a "thief" stealing yams, so he set up a scarecrow that was made of sticky glue and left. Anaanu didn't know his son put it up, so he shouted at the scarecrow and began hitting it. Anaanu became stuck and was thereby caught by his family the next morning. Anaanu was ashamed and ran to hide in the roof tops, and that is why a spider can always be found around the roof.
- The Wise Fool: This story is based on a man born into a family of many but who was treated differently. He was made fun of by the people of his village daily. One day, his mother found a baby with long hair. She had waited a few days to see if anyone would claim the baby but nobody did, so she cut off the baby's hair. A group of fairies came to claim the baby, but wanted its hair put back. Everyone knew that wasn't possible and tried to offer them gifts, but they declared that the woman shall die for her punishment. The man, known as the fool, stepped up and said the fairies can take his mother after they have cleared all the footprints they made crossing his land. Agreeing, they tried to do so but for every footprint they cleared, they made more behind them. Soon, the fairies gave up and left. This has made it so that nobody is ever cast out, and that everyone is treated equally as everyone else.
- How Tortoise Won by Losing: This story is about a tortoise and his wife going without food. They went to his wife's father and asked him for some food. The father said yes, and Tortoise took the food home. Tortoise and his wife ate the food within a few days. Tortoise didn't want to ask for more food, so he decided to wait until nightfall and go take it. The basket he tried to use became too heavy to carry, but he continued to try to pick it up. He was caught in the morning by his wife's father, and was tied to a tree where everyone could see him. People stopped and asked why he was still there days later. The father was seen to be more evil than the tortoise being a thief. The blame became the father's, and this is how people can make themselves not liked by taking their justice too far.
- The Elephant, the Tortoise and the Hare: A story based on a race and who was faster. The elephant, tortoise and hare began a race and both the elephant and the hare were faster than the tortoise. Tortoise had a plan, where he would line up his family and friends at different intervals of the race and they would be the one accounted for. In the end, the tortoise won but it was another family member who crossed the finish line. Nobody knew that it wasn't tortoise from the beginning of the race that crossed the finish line.
- The Snakebite Medicine: This is a story about a hunter, who was very poor. He went hunting one day and stumbled upon a hole with animals and a man inside who had gotten stuck. They all begged the hunter to release them and he did. They were all so grateful, they brought him gifts, which turned out to be stolen from the village chief. One gift was not and that was from a snake, who said it was medicine against all snake bites. The chief was told by the hunter's friend that the hunter had all of his stolen items. The chief told people to go get the hunter and that he must die. On the way to kill the hunter, the chief's daughter was bitten by a snake. The only person who could save her was the hunter. The hunter gave the chief's daughter the medicine and was released. The friend of the hunter was sentenced to take the hunter's place and was killed.
- A Mother's Love: A story about two wives married to one man. One wife could have children, and the other could not. The one who could have children had one daughter. The wife who could not have children became mean. The mother had to go to a market, which was a few days walk away and she left her daughter with the other wife. She also left food for her to feed to her daughter. The mother left and the other wife began being mean to the daughter. She made the daughter do many chores and run errands, with little to no food and water. The daughter began to cry and sing a song into the ground that would eventually get back to her mother. By the time her mother returned, her daughter had sunk into the ground with only her head showing. The mother cried out to the gods and they felt sorry for her, so they broke open the ground and her daughter was released.

== See also ==
Nigeria, Ghana, Benin

- Igbo religion
  - Alusi
  - Odinani
- Yoruba religion
  - List of Yoruba deities
  - Orisha
- Akan religion
- West African Vodún

Senegambia

- Serer religion (A ƭat Roog)
  - Roog
  - Serer creation myth
  - Ndut initiation rite
  - Lamane
  - Saltigue

Objects

- Juju
- Nkisi (Congo)

African diaspora

- African diaspora religions
  - Haitian Vodou
  - Loa
  - Winti
