= Skin of the Sea =

2021 young adult novel by Natasha Bowen

- First edition
- Author: Natasha Bowen
- Language: English
- Genre: Fantasy, Young adult
- Publisher: Random House
- Publication date: 2 November 2021
- Publication place: Nigeria/Wales
- Pages: 320
- ISBN: 978-0-593-12094-1
- Followed by: Soul of the Deep

Skin of the Sea is a 2021 young adult fantasy novel by Nigerian Welsh writer Natasha Bowen. Bowen's debut novel follows Simi, a mami wata who travels across sea and land in search of the Supreme Creator after breaking a law that threatens the existence of all mami wata.

The book entered the New York Times and Indie Bestseller list a week after it was released in November 2021. The sequel, Soul of the Deep, was released in 2022.

== Plot ==
Simi is one of the Mami Wata, mermaid-like beings created by the goddess Yemoja. They collect the souls of enslaved people who die at sea and send them to the afterlife. However, Simi misses her former existence as a human. She is able to take human form at will, although walking causes her pain. When she finds a human boy still alive after being thrown from a slave ship, she breaks the rules and rescues him. The boy, Kola, is desperate to return to his family.

Yemoja tells Simi that she has endangered the Mami Wata by breaking their laws. Unless she gains forgiveness from the Supreme Creator, Olodumare, they will all die. For an audience with Olodumare, Simi will need a pair of powerful obsidian rings. The rings are in the possession of a babalawo who lives near Kola’s village. Kola offers to take Simi there. They will need to avoid Olodumare’s treacherous messenger, the trickster orisa named Esu.

Simi sets out in her human form with Kola. They encounter humans as well as orisas and magical creatures. Reaching land, they are welcomed by the small, friendly yumboes. Kola reveals that his younger siblings, twins, are the prophesied manifestation of two orisas and their birth has brought prosperity to the land. He usually protects them and is afraid for their safety. A yumbo child, Issa, joins Simi and Kola as their guide. Simi saves Kola from a Ninki Nanka. Attraction has been growing between Simi and Kola, but if a Mami Wata falls in love with a human, she will melt into sea foam.

They arrive at Kola's village too late. The twins, who now hold the obsidian rings, have been kidnapped by Esu, who plans to use the rings to become as powerful as Olodumare. In the twins’ absence, the land is suffering. Simi and Kola set out with a map to Esu’s island, accompanied by Kola’s bodyguards Bem, Yinka and Idefayo. During their voyage, Simi leaves the ship to make a bargain with Olokun, the imprisoned orisa of the deep ocean. As she returns, the rest of the group sees her in her Mami Wata form, revealing her true identity. Kola reassures her that she can trust the others.

They reach Esu’s island, but must fight their way past dangerous monsters. Members of the group are lost one by one. Kola, Simi and Idefayo finally reach Esu's palace, where the twins are imprisoned. Idefayo reveals himself as Esu and nearly kills Kola. Simi tricks Esu and jumps with him out of his tower into the sea, where Olokun captures him. She returns to land, where the twins revive Kola and allow Simi to successfully request Olodumare’s forgiveness. Simi admits to Kola that as part of her bargain with Olokun, she agreed to serve him in the Land of the Dead. He tries to stop her, but she leaps into the sea.

== Development ==
Bowen said she first became interested in mermaids and underwater worlds after reading The Little Mermaid as a kid. She wanted "to write the story I wanted to read", which included Black mermaids and West African traditions. Bowen began researching African civilizations, such as the Kingdom of Benin, and West African mythology after finding out that Yemọja, a goddess in the Ifá belief system, was believed to follow the first enslaved Africans to gather their souls home after they died. During her research, she spoke to an Ifá priest to learn more about the Orísha and Yoruba culture.

Bowen wrote the novel while teaching full-time in a school. She wrote the book sometimes before school and during any free time she got in a notebook. She included mythological creatures of West and Central Africa including Senegalese fairies called Yumboes, Ninki-Nanka, a river monster, Sasabonsam, giant vampire bats, and Bultungin, shapeshifters who could turn into Werehyenas.

== Reception ==
Kirkus Reviews gave the novel a starred review, praising its pacing and the use of Yoruba religion and other West African religious traditions alongside "beloved, familiar elements". The review concluded by calling Skin of the Sea a "divine debut that explores the glories of West African myth, religion, and history."

A review for Publishers Weekly commented on Natasha Bowen's attempt at writing about West Africa as "a historical place of great invention, fellowship, and hope" while avoiding to focus on the "human suffering" of the region. Writing for the School Library Journal, India Winslow called the story in the novel "a testament to the strength of the human spirit amid tragedy".

Caitlyn Paxson, reviewing for the NPR, acknowledged Bowen's use of The Little Mermaid as a starting point to talk about the effect of slavery on the people of Africa, but also noted the novel "takes a wider view of the lives of the people who have been uprooted by slavery and the rich and complex cultures they were stolen from." Paxson praised the depiction of the Yoruba gods, as well as the lore present in the novel, "from the Mami Wata to Senegalese fairy-folk called Yumboes". Writing about the characters, Paxson said the protagonist "is definitely the richest personality in the story", but criticized the lack of development of the supporting cast.

== See also ==
- The Deep, a story depicting an underwater society built by the water-breathing descendants of pregnant slaves thrown overboard from slave ships.
- Ten-Cent Daisy, a fantasy drama film centered on a Caribbean family who adopted a mermaid. The introduction mentions the belief that enslaved people thrown from slave ships have survived beneath the water in other forms.
