= Ten-Cent Daisy =

- Directed by: Lisbon Okafor
- Written by: Cheryl Latouche; Obieze Okafor
- Produced by: Dominique Johnson; Lisbon Okafor
- Edited by: Aristides Zamora
- Music by: Komica Purnell
- Production company: Ohaoma Productions
- Release dates: October 21, 2021 (Urbanworld); October 28, 2022
- Country: United States
- Language: English

Ten-Cent Daisy: A Lost Mermaid Tale is a 2021 American fantasy drama film by Lisbon Okafor. It follows three sisters who are summoned back to their home in the West Indies, but must first reconcile with each other and protect vulnerable youngest sister Daisy, who is secretly a mermaid.

== Plot ==
Three sisters, Orchid, Violet, and Daisy, who fled their childhood home in the Caribbean West Indies, now live in California and are semi-estranged. Violet is Daisy's caretaker, while Orchid is raising Daisy's eleven-year-old daughter Zara. Unbeknownst to the others, Daisy is in contact with Zara.

Orchid is shocked by a phone call from a retired police inspector, Albert Leonce. The sisters’ mother, Iris, has been in prison back home for the murder of Pastor John Patrick, a man accused of raping Daisy when she was a child. She is now free due to the efforts of Orchid's lawyers but is in ill health. Orchid prepares to take her family home. Meanwhile, Violet drops Daisy off at her cleaning job at a photography studio. Daisy finds the owner, Otis, passed out under a table. She touches him, waking him up. He tries to make conversation, but she is unresponsive and then leaves. When Violet arrives and can't find her, she argues with Otis. Otis, a photographer who's losing his sight, is fascinated by Daisy.

Daisy has gone to see Zara at school. Orchid arrives to find them together and is amazed. Daisy runs away, but Orchid catches up and tells her the news that it's time to return home. After getting a call from Orchid and hanging up on her, Violet goes to the home of longtime family friend Meera. Meera is working with Inspector Leonce and has filled a pool in her backyard with imported saltwater, supposedly for a new species of exotic fish. Although seemingly helpful, she has motives of her own and begins threatening Violet and demanding that she bring Daisy to her.

Orchid tells Zara their family's story. The sisters’ mother, Iris, found the infant Daisy alone in a boat on the seashore. She raised her as her own, but the local pastor John Patrick called her a spirit child and led the town to shun her. As Daisy grew older, rumors spread of a siren who bathed at night. When she was a teenager, Pastor John raped her; Iris went to prison for his murder, while the three sisters fled to California. The night after Daisy gave birth to Zara, she ran away. These events drove a wedge between the older sisters, and eventually Violet left while Orchid raised Zara.

Violet returns to Otis's studio to apologize and ask for help; she's ready to join Orchid. However, Meera's men force their way into the studio and demand to know where Daisy is. They get Orchid's address from Violet's phone. After they leave, Otis realizes that his eyesight has improved, and Violet reveals that Daisy has healing powers.

Meera's men arrive at Orchid's home, threatening the family. Leonce explains that he never believed Iris killed John Patrick, but that she was covering for Daisy. Daisy goes with them to Meera's home. Meera greets her by the saltwater pool and reveals that she is a mermaid and Daisy's mother; their kind always leaves their daughters to be raised by another, as Daisy did with Zara. Meera feels responsible for Daisy's fate and is the one who murdered the pastor in revenge. Iris confessed to protect Meera, while Meera arranged for the three girls to leave. She explains that Daisy's sisters want to take her back to heal the dying Iris, but claims that Iris serves no more purpose. She gets into the pool, where she transforms into a mermaid. She urges Daisy to join her and abandon her mortal family. Daisy's family arrives looking for her, and she turns away from Meera and runs to them. As Daisy embraces her sisters and daughter, Meera dissolves, leaving the pool empty. The film ends with a shot of Daisy and Zara walking together through the trees towards the waters of the Caribbean, and briefly shows their mermaid tails as they swim out to sea.

== Cast ==
- Lauren Michelle as Daisy
- Dionne Audain as Violet
- Ameenah Kaplan as Orchid
- Margaret Laurena Kemp as Meera
- Obinna Okafor as Zara
- Jamal Ademola as Otis
- Gordon Greene as Albert Leonce
- Zack Gold as Drew
- Larvell Hood as Rodrigo

== Production ==
The story was inspired by Lisbon Okafor's visit to Grenada in 2001 for his mother-in-law's funeral, where he learned of a local girl shunned for being different, and by memories of his village in eastern Nigeria where a girl with Down syndrome was similarly bullied. The original script written in 2003 was about a family returning home to bury their matriarch, and Okafor added supernatural elements while telling his daughter myth-inspired versions of the story involving mermaids. Some mythological aspects were added in post-production, which was delayed by the COVID-19 pandemic. Okafor expressed interest in filming a prequel.

Funds for post-production were raised through Kickstarter, and the film drew attention for its depiction of Black mermaids. Filming took place in Oakland and Sebastopol, Berkeley and the island of St. Lucia in the West Indies. The film premiered on October 2, 2021, at the Urbanworld Film Festival and was screened at the online American Black Film Festival from November 3 to 14, 2021.

== Reception ==
The film was nominated for Best Narrative Feature and Best Director in the American Black Film Festival.

Black Girl Nerds' Stacey Yvonne found the film engaging although occasionally confusing with the number of subplots, praised the performances of Lauren Michelle and Ameenah Kaplan, and stated that the film is "worth a viewing if you’re a fan of modernized retellings of African myths." Danielle Kessler of Spectrum Culture graded it at 79%, praising its exploration of generational trauma.

The film has been noted by scholars for depicting Black mermaids, and has been compared to modern examinations of Mami Wata spirits and works such as Gabrielle Tesfaye's stop-motion film The Water Will Carry Us Home (2018) and Drexciya's music, which depict pregnant West African women lost at sea during the Middle Passage becoming mermaid-like spirits. Ten-Cent Daisy also makes reference to the Middle Passage.

== See also ==
- Skin of the Sea, a fantasy novel featuring the Mami Wata, mermaids who collect the souls of enslaved people thrown overboard from slave ships.
- The Deep, a story depicting an underwater society built by the water-breathing descendants of pregnant slaves thrown overboard from slave ships.
