= Nala Damajanti =

Stage name of a late 19th-century snake charmer

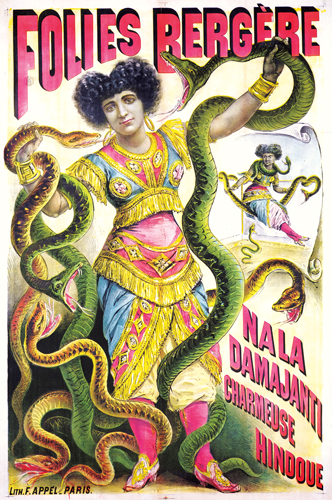
- Promotional poster for Nala Damajanti at the Folies Bergère, c. 1886
- Born: Mathilde Marie Amelia Poupon; July 4, 1861; Nantey, Jura, France
- Died: June 17, 1944 (aged 82); New York City, U.S.
- Other names: Mala Damajaute; Nata Damajaute; Nala Damajante
- Occupation: Snake charmer
- Years active: c. 1880s–1890s
- Known for: Snake-charming performances with P. T. Barnum's circus and at the Folies Bergère; promotional posters that influenced later depictions of Mami Wata
- Spouses: John Palmer (m. 1886; died 1896); William John Kruyt (m. 1900)

Nala Damajanti was the stage name of Mathilde Marie Amelia Poupon (4 or 5 July 1861 – 17 June 1944), a French snake charmer who performed throughout Europe and the United States during the late nineteenth century. After learning the art of snake charming from her husband, acrobat John Palmer, she toured with P. T. Barnum's circus and later appeared at the Folies Bergère in Paris.

Her promotional posters became some of the best-known images of nineteenth-century snake charmers and are thought to have influenced later depictions of the African water spirit Mami Wata. She also performed under the variant stage names Mala Damajaute, Nata Damajaute, and Nala Damajante.

== Early life ==
Mathilde Marie Amelia Poupon was born in Nantey, Jura, France, on 4 or 5 July 1861; the sources differing by one day. She was the daughter of Xavier Poupon and Madeleine Perrodin.

By 1881, at about 20 years old, Poupon was working as a governess for a French family in Saint Petersburg, Russian Empire. There she met John Palmer, a ceiling-walking acrobat. Palmer introduced her to the art of snake charming, which became the foundation of her performing career.

== Career ==
After developing her skills, Poupon toured in America and joined Barnum's famous circus troupe in 1885 as Nala Damajanti. She then returned to Paris to perform at the Folies Bergère (debuting on 18 February 1887).

The revelation of Poupon's given name was prompted by a lawsuit, in which the plaintiff had confused her with another person. As Poupon was scheduled to depart for Hamburg in the near future, with her eight enormous boas, she allowed her true identity to be revealed to have the case resolved as soon as possible.

Henry Drewal indicated that in Hamburg, Germany, a professional animal dealer named Breitwieser who often worked as a specialist snake procurer with the Tierpark Hagenbeck, a famous zoo in Hamburg, returned from a supposed trip to Asia with a new wife who performed as a snake charmer under the name of Maladamajaute, starting around 1880.

Drewal supposed that she might have come from Samoa or Borneo. Lademann-Priemer goes to some lengths to demonstrate the possibility of this idea. Lorenz Hagenbeck, son of Carl Hagenbeck, the zoo's founder, recalled in his autobiography that Breitwieser's wife had "done stage business with snakes" and that Breitwieser had been a showman at one time.

Carl Hagenbeck fondly recalled her in a section of his 1909 autobiography Von Tieren und Menschen, though in the 1912 abridged English translation, that portion was omitted. Hagenbeck refers to her as a "Provençalin" (a native of Provence). He further relates that she married an (unnamed) circus ceiling-walker, and they developed an innovative snake taming technique that allowed them to create an extremely successful act that toured America under the name Nala Damajante to much acclaim.

On 4 October 1884, "Nala Damajanta" published a notice in the New York Clipper that she had severed her relationship with her manager John Palmer. On 11 October, John Palmer (son of prominent ceiling-walker James Palmer) published a notice in the same publication that "Nala Damajanta (so called) whom I had engaged for the last three years" had severed their business relationship unilaterally. He asserted his rights to the name under that and other spellings and stated that he had engaged another performer from Europe to come to America and continue the act. In 1894, Palmer was still managing the act and was referred to as "husband of Nala Damajanti" in his 1896 obituary.

== Marketing and public image ==
From the beginning of her performing career in the early 1880s, Poupon was promoted less as a French performer than as an exotic snake charmer from the East. Although later records established that she was born Emilie (Mathilde Marie Amelia) Poupon in France in 1861, advertisements consistently described her as a Hindu woman. Even her stage name formed part of the illusion, combining the names of the Mahabharata's Nala and Damayanti. Her publicity reflected the Orientalist themes popular in European and American entertainment during the late nineteenth century.

As her reputation grew, so did the mythology surrounding her origins. In January 1884, at about age 22, she told the Daily Alta California that she had been born in the "French settlements of Judea". The reporter remarked that her English was so limited that "no attempt is made here to reproduce her queer pronunciation and phraseology", reinforcing her carefully cultivated foreign persona. Later that year, a humorous anecdote published in Puck reported that, while touring with the Forepaugh Circus, she jokingly claimed to be from Connecticut.

She continued to present different versions of her background as her career progressed. In 1885, at age 23 or 24, while appearing at Madison Square Garden in New York, she told the New York Tribune that she had been born in one of the "French provinces of India" and that her father had been "a hunter of wild beasts for native and European menageries". Her husband, John Palmer, translated much of the interview because of her strong French accent. Nearly a decade later, in 1894, while performing at the Palace Theatre, London, she instead claimed to be a native of Pondicherry.

Her appearance became just as important as the stories told about her. Carl Hagenbeck later remembered her as having an "extraordinarily graceful figure", large dark eyes and unusually long dark hair, qualities echoed in her promotional posters. After her debut at the Folies Bergère in Paris in 1887, at age 25, those posters became some of the best-known images associated with snake charmers. One was later described as "one of the most beautiful" produced for the theatre, and reproductions have remained popular into the twenty-first century.

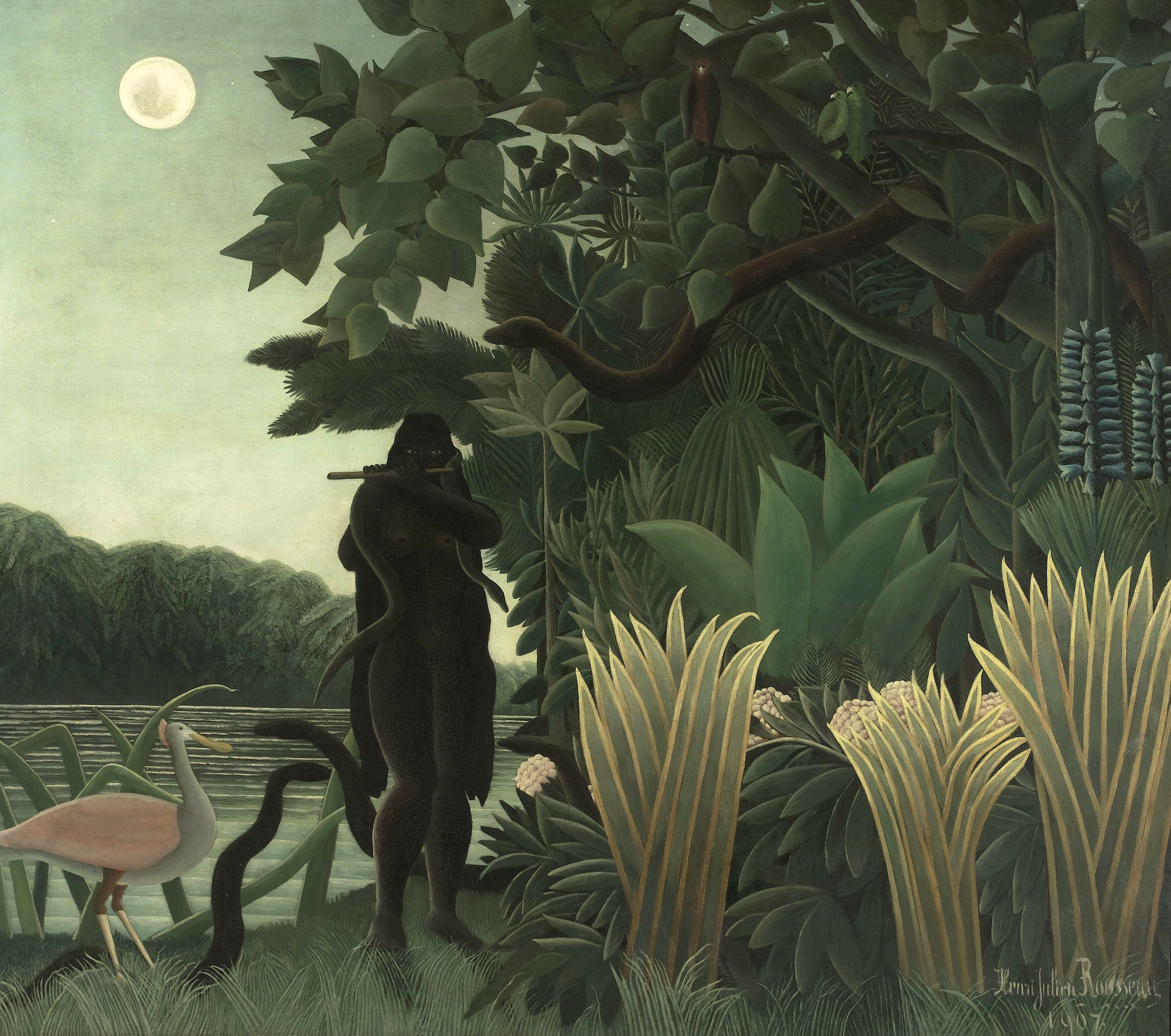
La Charmeuse de serpents by Henri Rousseau (1907)

The image created for Poupon ultimately proved more enduring than the act itself. Art historian Henry Drewal has argued that her famous snake-charmer poster became one of the principal visual sources for later depictions of the African water spirit Mami Wata and the Dominican spiritual figure Santa Marta la Dominadora. By 1907, while she was still alive and in her mid-forties, the same imagery is thought to have inspired the French automaton La Charmeuse de Serpent, produced by Roullet & Decamps, and may also have influenced Henri Rousseau's painting La Charmeuse de serpents (The Snake Charmer).

== Marriage and relationships ==
On 20 April 1886, at 24 years old, Poupon married John Palmer at St John the Evangelist, Walworth, Surrey, England.

After John Palmer's death, Poupon married William John Kruyt on 4 April 1900 in Soho, London, England. They later immigrated to the United States, where she usually went by the name Mathilda Kruit.

== Death ==
She died in New York City at the age of 83 on 17 June 1944.
