= The Deep (novella) =

2019 novel by Rivers Solomon

- Author: Rivers Solomon with: Daveed Diggs; William Hutson; Jonathan Snipes
- Audio read by: Daveed Diggs
- Language: English
- Published: 2019 (Saga / Gallery Press)
- Publication place: United States
- Awards: Lambda Literary Award
- ISBN: 978-1-534-43986-3

The Deep is a 2019 fantasy book by Rivers Solomon, with Daveed Diggs, William Hutson and Jonathan Snipes. It depicts an underwater society built by the water-breathing descendants of pregnant slaves thrown overboard from slave ships. The book was developed from a song of the same name by Clipping, an experimental hip-hop trio. It won the Lambda Literary Award, and was nominated for Hugo, Nebula and Locus awards.

== Background ==
In 2017, Chicago Public Radio program This American Life aired an episode called “We Are in the Future” dealing with Afrofuturism, a cultural aesthetic, philosophy of science and philosophy of history that explores the developing intersection of African diaspora culture with technology. Show producer Neil Drumming also commissioned a song for the episode called “The Deep” from hip-hop group Clipping. According to the group, "The Deep" is an homage to Acid/Techno duo Drexciya, residing in the same mythological universe created for their music: "All of their records refer to a utopian underwater civilization founded by African mothers thrown overboard from slave ships. It’s like if Wakanda were Atlantis. We mashed that up with a few details from Parliament’s Motor Booty Affair album, as if they and Drexiya were writing about two different aspects of the same place."

Saga Press senior editor Navah Wolfe became "transfixed" by the "stories that need to be told" in the album Clipping put out a short time later, which led to a Hugo Award nomination for Best Dramatic Presentation (short form). With the trio's blessings, she set out to find a writer to bring the story to life. She found the voice she was looking for in Rivers Solomon, who was already interested in much of what was in the material, including "diaspora and slavery, ecological devastation, memory and remembrance", the lyrics evoking African women drowned on the journey across the sea, of climate change and environmental destruction, of the passion of the ancestors and drive of the survivors:

Our mothers were pregnant African women thrown overboard while / crossing the Atlantic Ocean on slave ships. We were born / breathing water as we did in the womb. We built our home on the / seafloor, unaware of the two-legged surface dwellers until / their world came to destroy ours. With cannons, they searched / for oil beneath our cities. Their greed and recklessness forced / our uprising. Tonight, we remember.

— Clipping, The Deep

Solomon found the existing outline of the story well-suited for novel form, but still had to develop a main character to carry the story, with a unique voice and back story. This became Yetu, the protagonist, memory-keeper of her people. Clipping members Daveed Diggs, William Hutson and Jonathan Snipes were involved with the book's development throughout, and are listed as co-authors. Daveed Diggs narrates the audiobook.

== Plot synopsis ==
The wajinru, are water-breathing merfolk, the descendants of thousands of pregnant African slave women thrown overboard from slave ships crossing the Atlantic. The women drowned, but their babies survived, and eventually developed into their current form. They have built their own idyllic underwater society. Only one person—Yetu, the Historian—holds all their often-traumatic memories, so the rest are spared the pain. The historian must suppress all their own personality and desire, and only once a year, the entire community relives the memories together.

The burden she carries threatens to destroy Yetu, so she flees to the surface while the community is observing its annual remembrance ritual, finding herself trapped in a tidal pool. Here, she meets some of the dreaded "two-legs", and in particular, Oori, who is also, in her own way, a memory-keeper of her people. Oori brings Yetu fish to eat, and the two develop a bond. Yetu comes to realize that not all the two-legs are white slave traders.

However, this is juxtaposed against the revelation that the wajinru warred against the surface world a generation prior. This is told through the memories of Basha, Yetu's predecessor, who lived when the wajinru were threatened by global warming and energy companies desiring the fossil fuels lying below the ocean bed: "Below us, deep beneath the sand, there is a substance they crave. It is their life force. They feast on it like blood." Basha led the wajinru, whose emotions can telekinetically control the ocean's water, in creating a massive storm and tidal wave that wreaked devastation on the surface world.

Having been abandoned by their Historian, the wajinru beneath the surface are slowly being driven mad by the burden of their people's traumatic memories. Their madness is creating a storm like the one that previously engulfed the surface world. Yetu must decide whether or not to return, saving both her people and the surface-dwellers like Oori, at the cost of retaking the burden of her people's memories.

== Reception ==
Reviewing for NPR, Jason Heller calls The Deep "immersive, gut-wrenching, and poetic". He notes that the unique composition of music, poetry and prose from various creators that is The Deep is more typical of television and film, but that it works remarkably well in this case. Heller concludes: "For all its complexity in origin and concept, The Deep is an elegantly concise and simple novel. Yetu's plight is an essential, emotionally fraught conflict between duty and sacrifice, between tradition and progress, between the individual and the common good, and between vengeance and forgiveness. Furthermore, enjoying the story doesn't require any foreknowledge of clipping., Drexciya, or the mythology of the wajinru that precedes it; while those elements certainly enrich the novel, Solomon's text stands alone as a wise, daring, touching, and important addition to the Afrofuturist canon, and one that carries its own rhythmic and melodic grace — not to mention a wholly relevant and righteous gravity."

In a starred review, Publishers Weekly enumerates the creative iterations built upon the historical drowning of pregnant African women by white slavers, beginning with Drexciya's imagining of the infants surviving as a community of merfolk, leading to the rap recounting of conflict between the people of the sea and the people of the land, though Solomon's development of a novel with individual characters and deeper exploration of the larger themes, with prose "that is by turns meditative, didactic, and rawly angry". The review raves that Solomon interrogates the devastations of slavery without ever showing a white perspective, in a tour de force reorientation of the storytelling gaze. This superb, multilayered work will speak to any empathetic reader, and be best appreciated by those steeped in its cultural and artistic context.

In Locus Magazine, Gary K. Wolf analyzes the suitability of representing the horrors of the Middle Passage that are at the root of The Deep, along with other historic catastrophes such as the Holocaust and indigenous genocides, in the fantasy genre, saying that they "seem to both demand and resist fantasy: on the one hand, the imagination needed to even approximate it in fiction requires resources beyond those of realistic or historical fiction, while on the other, invoking the tools of SF or fantasy risks turning historical outrage into comforting myth." He notes that while some Holocaust survivors claim that personal testimony is the only appropriate representation, in the case of African women drowned hundreds of years ago there can be no testimony only imagination. He then rates Solomon's depiction as "a powerful combination of anguish and hope", He concludes: "As bleak as the history of the wajinru may be, and as challenging as the new threats from above may seem, Solomon manages to end the novel on a surprisingly hopeful note, in the form of Yetu and Oori’s unlikely romance. When Yetu promises her that “we will make a new thing,” it doesn't really do much to assuage the weight of nightmare histories, but it's something." Review partner Ian Mond concurs, writing "The Deep is a beautifully written, thoughtful novella, one, that as Diggs says in his afterword, is over far too quickly."

In the Tor.com review, Alex Brown describes The Deep as "Afrofuturism with a folklore twist", concluding that its "slim page count disguises the depth of the work within. Rivers Solomon conjures a vast world... one where history and present day collide and love can change lives. The text is ever-changing as the ocean itself. Shifting from third person to first person plural, at times it feels as lyrical as the song from whence it came. The story unbalances and redefines. It will trail in your wake long after you finish it. Yetu is a force to behold, and I for one am immensely grateful that Solomon allowed us to witness her story."

Booklist's starred review states that "Solomon’s beautiful novella weaves together a moving and evocative narrative that imagines a future created from the scars of the past. Highly recommended for those interested in sf or fantasy that draws upon the legacies of colonialism and racism to imagine different, exciting types of futures". In a generally positive review, Book Reporter's review adds that The Deep is "a challenging read, unique in its telling and provocative in its themes. Solomon’s prose is powerful and delicate—a poetic and insightful examination of violence, racism, pain, memory and identity."

== Awards and honors ==
Year	Award	Category	Result	Ref.
2019	Nebula Award	Novella	Nominated	
2019	Otherwise Award	—	Honor List	
2020	British Fantasy Award	Novella	Shortlisted	
2020	Hugo Award	Novella	Finalist	
2020	Ignyte Award	Novella	Finalist	
2020	Lambda Literary Award	LGBTQ Science Fiction/Fantasy/Horror	Won	
2020	Locus Award	Novella	Finalist	
2020	World Fantasy Award	Novella	Nominated	

== See also ==
- Skin of the Sea, a fantasy novel featuring the Mami Wata, mermaids who collect the souls of enslaved people thrown overboard from slave ships.
- Ten-Cent Daisy, a fantasy drama film centered on a Caribbean family who adopted a mermaid. The introduction mentions the belief that enslaved people thrown from slave ships have survived beneath the water in other forms.
