= Val-d'Épy =

- Commune
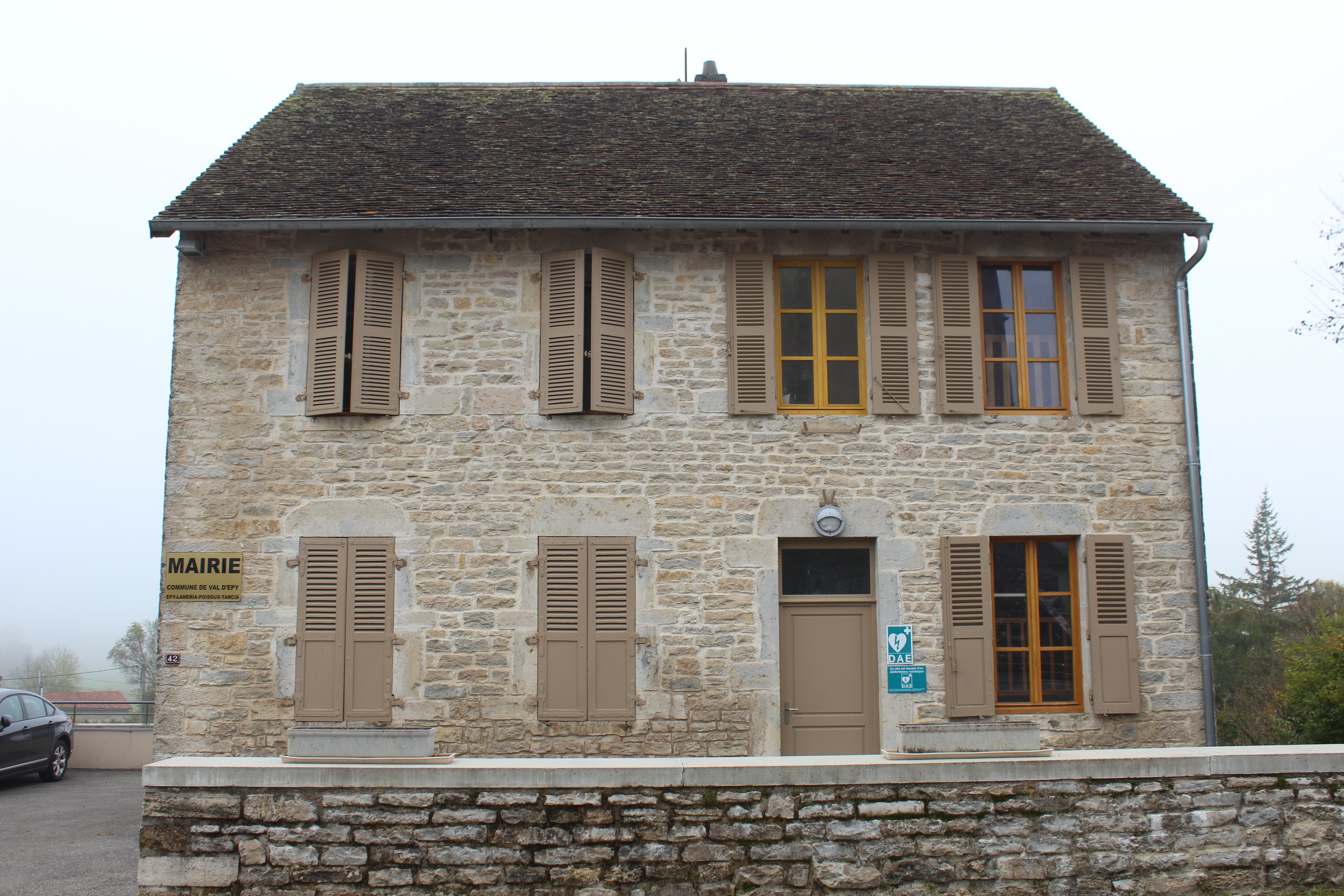
- The town hall in Val-d'Épy
- Location of Val-d'Épy
- Location within France Location within Bourgogne-Franche-Comté
- Coordinates: 46°23′01″N 5°23′56″E
- Country: France
- Region: Bourgogne-Franche-Comté
- Department: Jura
- Arrondissement: Lons-le-Saunier
- Canton: Saint-Amour

Government
  - Mayor (2020–2026): Michel Ganneval
- Area^{1}: 25.35 km^{2} (9.79 sq mi)
- Highest elevation: 555 m (1,821 ft)
- Lowest elevation: 285 m (935 ft)
- Population (2023): 322
  - Density: 12.7/km^{2} (32.9/sq mi)
- Time zone: UTC+01:00 (CET)
  - Summer (DST): UTC+02:00 (CEST)
- INSEE/Postal code: 39209 /39160
- ^{1} French Land Register data, which excludes lakes, ponds, glaciers > 1 km^{2} (0.386 sq mi or 247 acres) and river estuaries.

Val-d'Épy (French pronunciation: [val depi]) is a commune in the Jura department in the Bourgogne-Franche-Comté region in eastern France.

== History ==
Over time the commune of Épy absorbed the communes of Tarciat (1821), Lanéria (1971) and Poisoux (1972). It acquired its modern name in 1973.

On 1 January 2016, the former communes of Florentia, Nantey and Senaud were also merged into Val-d'Épy. On 1 January 2018, the former commune of La Balme-d'Épy was merged into Val-d'Épy.

== Population ==
Historical population
Year	Pop.	±% p.a.
1968	364	—
1975	299	−2.77%
1982	291	−0.39%
1990	269	−0.98%
1999	297	+1.11%
2007	336	+1.55%
2012	370	+1.95%
2017	343	−1.50%
2023	322	−1.05%
Source: INSEE

Population data refer to the area corresponding with the commune as of January 2025.

== See also ==
- Communes of the Jura department
