= Rivers Solomon =

American author (born 1989)

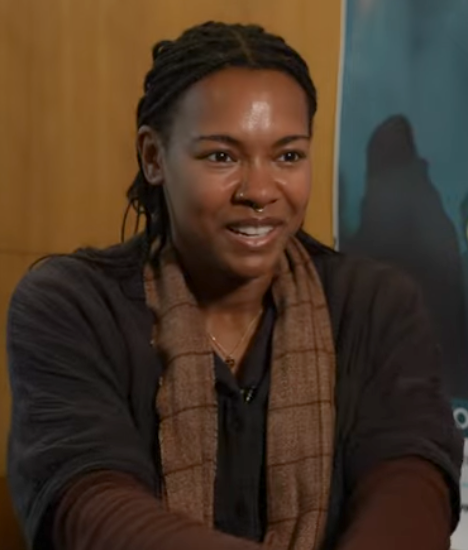
- Solomon in a 2025 interview
- Born: 1989 (age 36–37); California, U.S.
- Education: Stanford University (BA); University of Texas at Austin (MFA)
- Occupation: Writer
- Writing career
- Genres: Speculative fiction; literary fiction
- Notable work: The Deep
- Notable awards: Lambda Literary Award for Science Fiction, Fantasy and Horror (2020) Otherwise Award (2021)
- Website: rivers-solomon.com

Rivers Solomon (born 1989) is an American author of speculative fiction and literary fiction. They received the Community of Literary Magazines and Presses' Firecracker Award in Fiction in 2018 for their debut novel, An Unkindness of Ghosts. Their second novel, The Deep, won the 2020 Lambda Literary Award for Science Fiction, Fantasy and Horror. Their third novel, Sorrowland, won the 2021 Otherwise Award.

== Early life and education ==
Solomon grew up in California, Indiana, Texas, and New York. They received a bachelor's degree in Comparative Studies in Race and Ethnicity from Stanford University. They later received a Master of Fine Arts in Fiction Writing from the Michener Center for Writers at the University of Texas at Austin.

== Career ==
Solomon's debut novel, An Unkindness of Ghosts, was published in 2017 by Akashic Books. The book is a science fiction novel exploring the conjunction between structural racism and generation ships. It was name one of the best books of 2017 by The Guardian, NPR, Publishers Weekly, Library Journal, and Bustle. It was also named a Stonewall Honor Book. The novel received the 2018 Firecracker Award.

An Unkindness of Ghosts was a finalist for the Locus Award for Best First Novel, Lambda Literary Award for LGBT Sci-Fi/Fantasy/Horror, James Tiptree Jr. Award, and Hurston/Wright Legacy Award.

In 2018 and 2019, Solomon was a finalist for the John W. Campbell Award for Best New Writer.

Amal El-Mohtar at NPR writes of An Unkindness of Ghosts: "[T]he more I read the bigger I felt, falling down a rabbit-hole of sky and wanting only to go deeper and farther with every page." Gary K. Wolfe at Locus writes: "Solomon’s evocation of this society is so sharply detailed and viscerally realized, the characters so closely observed, the individual scenes so tightly structured, that the novel achieves surprising power and occasional brilliance."

Solomon's second book, The Deep, published by Saga Press in 2019, is based on the song of the same name by the experimental hip-hop group Clipping, and depicts a utopian underwater society built by the water-breathing descendants of pregnant slaves thrown overboard from slave ships. The Deep won the 2020 Lambda Literary Award for Science Fiction, Fantasy and Horror. It was a finalist for a 2019 Nebula Award, 2020 Locus Award, and 2020 Hugo Award.

Their third book, Sorrowland, was published by MCD Books in May 2021. The novel is described as "a genre-bending work of gothic fiction that wrestles with the tangled history of racism in America and the marginalization of society’s undesirables." In a review for The Guardian, Hephzidah Anderson writes: "It’s about escape, self-acceptance and queer love. It’s about genocide and the exploitation of black bodies, self-delusion and endemic corruption, motherhood and inheritance." Sorrowland won the 2021 Otherwise Award; it was presented to Solomon during Wiscon 46, at which they were co-Guest of Honor with Martha Wells, in May of 2023.

Sorrowland was a finalist for the 2021 Ray Bradbury Prize given by the Los Angeles Times Book Prize.

In October 2024, Solomon's fourth book, Model Home, was published by MCD Books. It was a finalist for the 2025 Locus Award for Best Horror Novel. Lisa Tuttle for The Guardian describes the novel as "a disturbing, brilliantly twisty psychological horror exploring family dynamics, memory, gender identity and sexuality". Gabino Iglesias for Locus writes: "Stunningly written and full of the kind of trauma that can only come from family, this novel takes the haunted house trope and turns it into something that feels entirely new, very fresh, and packing an emotional punch that lingers way after you turn the last page."

Solomon's shorter work has been featured in Black Warrior Review, The New York Times, Guernica, The Best American Short Stories, Tor.com, The Paris Review, and elsewhere. They collaborated with authors Yoon Ha Lee, Becky Chambers, and S. L. Huang on the serial novel The Vela.

== Influences ==
Their literary influences include Ursula K. Le Guin, Octavia E. Butler, Alice Walker, Zora Neale Hurston, Ray Bradbury, Jean Toomer, and Doris Lessing.

== Personal life ==
Solomon is non-binary and intersex. They use fae/faer and they/them pronouns. (Note: This article uses they/them for consistency.)

Solomon describes themself as "a dyke, an anarchist, a she-beast, an exile, a shiv, a wreck, and a refugee of the Trans-Atlantic Slave Trade". They have ADHD and are autistic. Solomon is Jewish.

As of 2019, Solomon lives in Cambridge, England, with their family.

== Publications ==
=== Novels and novellas ===
- An Unkindness of Ghosts (2017, Akashic Books)
- The Deep (2019, Saga Press)
- The Vela (2019, Serial Box) (with Becky Chambers, Yoon Ha Lee, and S. L. Huang)
- Sorrowland (2021, MCD Books)
- Model Home (2024, MCD Books)

=== Short stories ===
- "Blood Is Another Word for Hunger" (2019, Tor.com)
- "St. Juju" (2019, The Verge)
- "Prudent Girls" in The Decameron Project: 29 New Stories from the Pandemic Selected by the Editors of The New York Times Magazine (2020, Simon & Schuster)
- "A Brief Note on the Translation of Winter Women, Written by the Collective Dead, Translated by Amal Ruth" in Small Odysseys: Selected Shorts Presents 35 New Stories (2022, Algonquin) (edited by Hannah Tinti)
