= Nantey =

- Part of Val-d'Épy
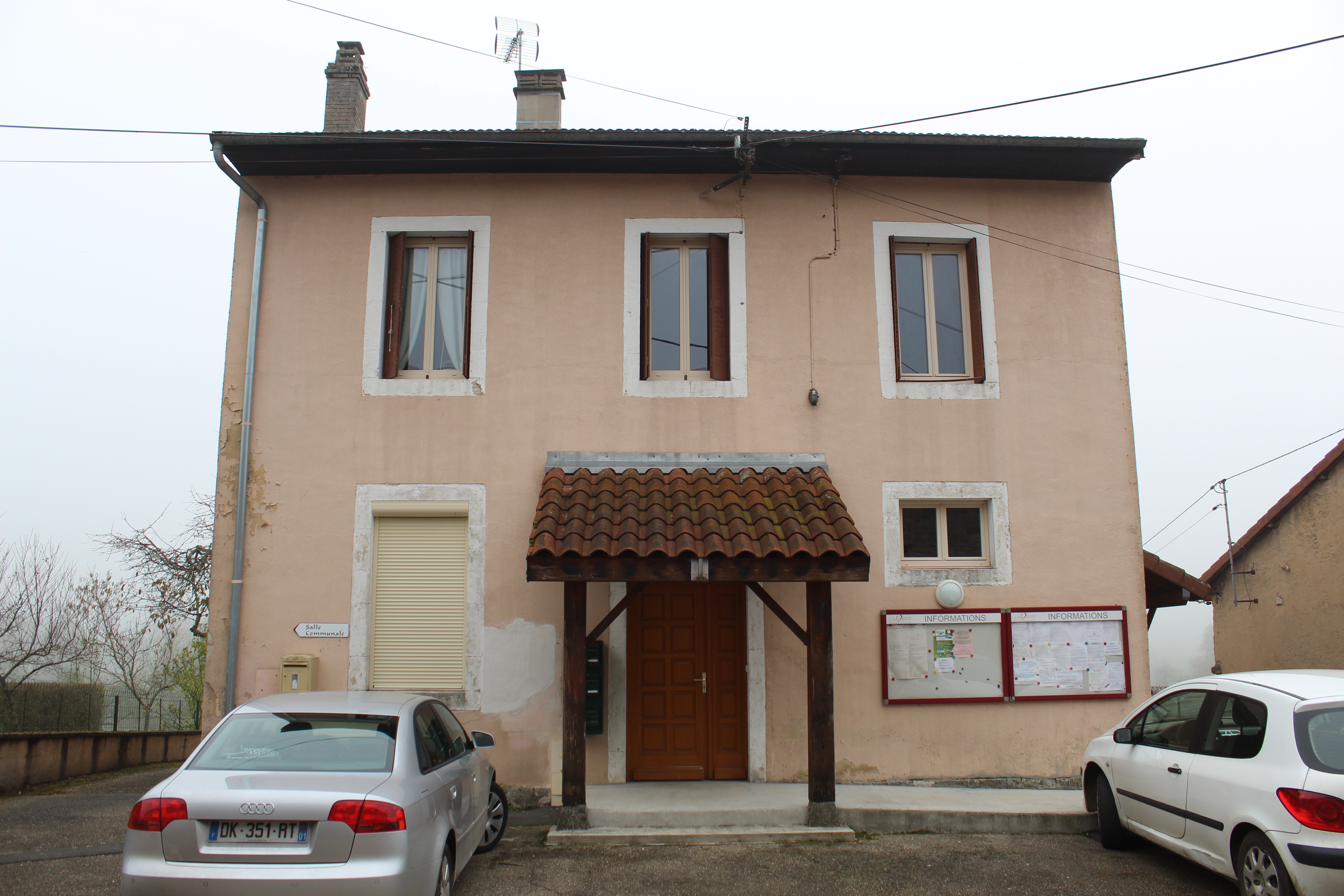
- Nantey Town hall
- Location of Nantey
- Location within France Location within Bourgogne-Franche-Comté
- Coordinates: 46°24′33″N 5°24′00″E
- Country: France
- Region: Bourgogne-Franche-Comté
- Department: Jura
- Arrondissement: Lons-le-Saunier
- Canton: Saint-Amour
- Commune: Val-d'Épy
- Area^{1}: 6.50 km^{2} (2.51 sq mi)
- Highest elevation: 620 m (2,030 ft)
- Lowest elevation: 382 m (1,253 ft)
- Population (2019): 59
  - Density: 9.1/km^{2} (24/sq mi)
- Time zone: UTC+01:00 (CET)
  - Summer (DST): UTC+02:00 (CEST)
- Postal code: 39160
- ^{1} French Land Register data, which excludes lakes, ponds, glaciers > 1 km^{2} (0.386 sq mi or 247 acres) and river estuaries.

Nantey (French pronunciation: [nɑ̃tɛ]) is a former commune in the Jura department in Bourgogne-Franche-Comté in eastern France. On 1 January 2016, it was merged into the commune of Val-d'Épy.

== Notable natives ==
The late 19th-century snake charmer Nala Damajanti (Marie Mathilde Émélie Poupon) was born in Nantey on 4 July 1861.

== See also ==
- Communes of the Jura department
