= Moussa Gname =

Moussa Gname (also Mousa-Gname, Mousa-Djinni, "Moses the Son of a Spirit") is a culture hero in epic and folklore tales of the Songhai people, in West Africa.

The main source for the hero are the epics collected by M. A. Dupuis Yakouba at the start of the twentieth century. Moussa's origin is mythical, and his father, like Moses unknown. He is born of a woman who falls asleep under a tree and is impregnated by a spirit that dwells in the tree. The boy child is named for Moses because, like Moses, his father is not known. A local leader, Kuruyore, sees in him the future leader of their people but they don't believe him, and Moussa is bullied by the other children. Finally, he goes to his mother, who in turn sends him to the tree where his spirit-father teaches him hunting magic. Kuruyore takes off his cap and offers it to the young man; while he refuses the cap, his expertise and leadership are clear, but he accepts his position as chief on the condition that none of the people will eat cooked food in the bush. His greatest heroic feat, performed while still young, was to defeat the mythical monster the Hira.

== Bibliography ==
- Belcher, Stephen: Epic Traditions of Africa (Bloomington: Indiana UP, 1999; ISBN 0253335019)
- Belcher, Stephen: African Myths of Origin (New York: Penguin, 2005; ISBN 9780140449457)
- Dupuis Yakouba, M. A.: Les Gow ou Chasseurs du Niger, Legendes Songaï de la Région de Tomboctou (Paris: Leroux, 1911)
