= Yumboes =

Supernatural beings in Wolof mythology

Yumboes are supernatural beings in the mythology of the Wolof people (most likely Lebou) of Senegal, West Africa. Their alternatively used name Bakhna Rakhna literally means good people.

== Description ==
Yumboes are the spirits of the dead and, like many supernatural beings in African beliefs, they are completely of a pearly-white colour. They are sometimes said to have silver hair. They stand about two feet tall.

The Yumboes live beneath the Paps hills and come out to dance in the moonlight. They feast on large tables, waited on by servants who are invisible except for their hands and feet. Yumboes eat corn (which they steal from the humans) and fish (which they catch on their own). They invite both natives and foreigners to their feasts.

== Background ==
The only known source for legends on yumboes is Thomas Keightley's book The Fairy Mythology. Keightley received his account from a woman who had lived on Goree Island, off the coast of Senegal, when she was a child. She had heard about the yumboes from a Wolof maid. Keightley remarked on the yumboes’ resemblance to European fairies. They also bear a resemblance to ancestral ghosts described in many African countries.

== In popular culture ==
On Pottermore, yumboes appeared as African house elves and the mascots of Senegal's national quidditch team.

One of the adventure gamebooks based on the television series Knightmare features yumboes as savage, flesh-eating creatures. Alighting on their island causes them to attack the player.

Yumboes appear as helpful fairies in the 2021 novel Skin of the Sea by Nigerian Welsh writer Natasha Bowen.

In the 2021 bizarro novella Not Seeing Is A Flower by Urhobo writer Erhu Kome, Yumboes are small creatures who assist in the running of the Dharma/Cupid organization.
