= John Palmer =

John Palmer may refer to:

== People ==
=== Politicians ===
- John Palmer (fl. 1377–1394), English politician
- Sir John Palmer, 5th Baronet (1735–1817), British politician
- John Palmer (1785–1840), U.S. congressman from New York
- John Palmer (1842–1905), secretary of state of New York and commander-in-chief of the Grand Army of the Republic
- John Hinde Palmer (1808–1884), English barrister and Liberal Party politician
- John William Palmer (1866–1958), U.S. Representative from Missouri
- John M. Palmer (politician) (1817–1900), U.S. Civil War general and governor and senator from Illinois
- John R. Palmer (1809–1877), Michigan politician

=== Architects ===
- John Palmer (architect) (1785–1846), English architect
- John Palmer (Bath architect) (1738–1817), English architect

=== Religious figures ===
- John Palmer (Unitarian, 1729?–1790), English minister, active in the Midlands and north
- John Palmer (Unitarian, 1742–1786), English minister, active in the south
- John Palmer (Master of Magdalene College) (died 1607), English clergyman and academic
- John Palmer (Archdeacon of Southern Melanesia) (1837–1902)

=== Military ===
- John M. Palmer (politician) (1817–1900), U.S. Civil War general and governor of Illinois
- John McAuley Palmer (general) (1870–1955), American First World War general and military theorist

=== Sports ===
- John Palmer (cricketer) (1881–1928), English cricketer
- John Palmer (rugby union) (born 1957), English rugby union player
- Johnny Palmer (1918–2006), golfer
- Bud Palmer (John S. Palmer; 1921–2013), New York Knicks player

=== Music ===
- John Palmer (composer) (born 1959), composer of instrumental and electronic music
- John Palmer (musician) (1943–2025), English musician
- John F. Palmer (1870–?), American songwriter

=== Criminals ===
- John Palmer, alias of highwayman Dick Turpin (1705–1739)
- John Palmer (criminal) (1950–2015), convicted time-share fraudster, nicknamed "Goldfinger"

=== Other people ===
- John Palmer, 4th Earl of Selborne (1940–2021), British peer and businessman
- John Palmer (actor) (c.1742–1798), English actor
- John Palmer (author) (1885–1944), English author
- John Palmer (Commissary of New South Wales) (1760–1833)
- John Palmer (director) (1943–2020), Canadian film and theatre director
- John Palmer (postal innovator) (1742–1818), inventor of the lightweight mail coach
- John Palmer (colonial administrator) (c. 1650 – c. 1700), first Englishman to purchase land in the Rockaway Peninsula
- John Palmer (TV journalist) (1935–2013), former NBC News correspondent
- John Horsley Palmer (1779–1858), English banker and Governor of the Bank of England
- John J. Palmer (born 1965), metallurgist and author of How to Brew
- John Anderson Palmer (born 1965), American philosopher
- John Ross Palmer (born 1974), American artist
- Johnny Ace Palmer (born 1960), American magician

== Characters ==
- John Palmer (Home and Away), fictional character
- Johnny Palmer (Family Affairs), fictional character

== Buildings ==
- John Denham Palmer House, a historic site in Fernandina Beach, Florida

== Ships ==
- John Palmer (1807 ship)
- John Palmer (1810 ship)
- John Palmer (1814 schooner), a ship wrecked in Bass Strait in 1818

== See also ==
- Jonathan Palmer (born 1956), entrepreneur and racecar driver
- Jonathan Palmer (American football) (born 1983), American football offensive lineman
