= Ninki Nanka =

Legendary creature of West African folklore

A Ninki Nanka is a legendary creature in West African folklore.

== Description ==
The Ninki Nanka has been described as "the most frightening spirit around the lower Gambia" and as "a sea spirit, a dragon-like creature with the attributes of a 'devil'." According to Lady Southorn, local residents were "dogged by fear of devils and chief among these is the Ninki Nanka... [If] seen by a man is a sure sign of approaching death." The Ninki Nanka kept many lower Gambians away from fertile swamps, rivers, hills, and creeks, and the creature was often believed to inhabit swampy forests and caves. Various accounts have also described it as a river or swamp dragon. The Mandinka people have also described the Ninki Nanka as a dragon with a "large body and small legs". Additionally, the Mandinka people often use "Ninki Nanka" as a term for dragons. Some accounts cover the possibility of the Ninki Nanka being a winged creature with the ability to breathe fire.

Descriptions of the creature vary across different tribes, but most contend that the animal is reptilian. It is depicted as having the head of a crocodile with the body of a donkey or a blend of hippopotamus and giraffe, and sometimes simply as a large snake. Additionally, it is often suspected of being a snake-like creature with a crest of feathers. Some accounts of the legendary creature describe it as a 9m or 30-foot long marsh-dwelling beast having a body like that of a crocodile, mirror-like scales and long neck like that of a giraffe with a horse's head along with three horns. Common across descriptions is its believed fatal stare, akin to Medusa, which is said to cause death upon eye contact. Folklore advises carrying mirrors to deflect its gaze. Another belief is that it has the ability to camouflage, using its scales which shimmer in various colors. The animal is said to be extremely large and very dangerous. Furthermore, the Ninki Nanka is said to have a gem inside its head, from which it derives its powers from.

A 1906 commissioner's report describes the creature:

The Mandingoes are firm believers in genii; every village is supposed to have two of these, a bad spirit and a good spirit. In some cases they say the village spirits or genii are male and female, sometimes the male is good and the female bad, and vice versa. A well-known Mandinka myth is the “ninki nanko”; this is supposed to resemble a gigantic crowned serpent which resides in the thickest bush. If a native sees the body of this creature he believes that he will be afflicted with dangerous sickness but that if he sees the eyes or crown it means instantaneous death. No native will go anywhere near where one of these creatures is supposed to be.

Evil spirits such as the Ninki Nanka were believed to bring about drought or famine. While there is no direct historical recollection of a drought or famine caused by these spirits, local sources believed that environmental catastrophes documented in written records might have been interpreted as the work of supernatural forces.

Tales of the creature were never recorded in any sort of non-modern text but the story of it has spread from tribe to tribe all over Africa. There is a song called "Ninki Nanka" on the album Casamance au clair de lune (1984) by the Senegalese music group Touré Kunda.

== Appearances ==
A group of "dragon hunters" from the Centre for Fortean Zoology (CFZ) went to Gambia in the summer of 2006 to investigate the Ninki Nanka and take testimony from those who have claimed to have seen the mythical creature. One interviewee who claimed to have had an encounter with a Ninki Nanka said it looked similar to an image of a Chinese dragon. The expedition, known as the "J. T. Downes Memorial Gambia Expedition 2006", received a fair amount of media attention, including coverage in a BBC Online article. Furthermore, cryptozoologist, Richard Freeman, claimed that there were Second-hand accounts on the sightings, with some claiming the creature "looked like a crocodile". Others described it as a "snake with wings and spitting fire".

== In popular culture ==
Ninki Nanka are featured in the 2021 fantasy novel, Skin of the Sea by Natasha Bowen. It is also depicted in the 2022 fantasy novel, "Moon Witch, Spider King" by Marlon James.

The creature is featured on "Ninki Nanka; Kikiyaon," episode 13 of Destination Truth's season 2.
