= Sorrowland =

2021 novel by Rivers Solomon

- Author: Rivers Solomon
- Language: English
- Published: 4 May 2021
- Publisher: MCD Books (Farrar, Straus and Giroux)
- Pages: 355 (Hardcover)
- ISBN: 0374266778

Sorrowland is a 2021 gothic science fiction novel by writer Rivers Solomon.

== Plot ==
Vern Riley grows up in the Blessed Gardens of Cain, a Black separatist cult. At the Blessed Gardens, or Cainland, she is forced to marry the cult’s leader, Reverend Sherman. Members of Cainland frequently experience “hauntings”; Vern believes that Sherman is drugging the congregation. Vernon is an intersex woman.

Vern escapes and gives birth to twins in the woods. During this time, she develops increased strength and healing abilities, as well as a bony tumor on her back. Despite being away from Cainland, she experiences continued hauntings. She is stalked by a figure called “the fiend”. Vern meets a biker named Ollie and begins a relationship with her. Vern learns that Ollie is the fiend, attacks her, and leaves her for dead. Vern decides to leave the woods and track down Lucy, a childhood friend who was also able to escape Cainland.

Vern and her children meet Bridget, Lucy’s aunt, as well as Gogo, a trans woman who works as an EMT. Vern realizes that the hauntings are actually fragments of other people’s memories rather than drug-induced hallucinations. Gogo discovers that Vern’s symptoms are caused by a newly discovered fungal infection. They theorize that the Cainland cult is a psyop designed to research the fungus and its effects on humans. Vern begins a relationship with Gogo. Vern sees a haunting of Reverend Sherman, who states he has been dead for three months. He tells Vern that the fungus absorbs the memories of the infected dead, creating the hauntings.

Ollie, who survived Vern’s attack, breaks into Bridget’s house. She uses Queen, a woman infected by the fungus, as a weapon. After a brief escape, Gogo is shot and Vern is captured. Ollie reveals that the government has been using Cainland to try to develop supersoldiers, which is difficult because most infected humans do not gain the superhuman strength of Queen and Ollie. Vern rips out Ollie’s throat, killing her. Distraught over Ollie’s death, Queen dies by suicide. Vern uses her fungal powers to heal Gogo. They rush to Cainland, but find that the government has killed everyone in a coverup. Vern uses her fungal powers to resurrect the dead.

== Publication history ==
The book was announced by Tor.com in October 2019 as an acquisition by the MCD Books division of Farrar, Straus and Giroux. It was published in May 2021 and is Solomon's third novel.

== Reception ==
Hephzibah Anderson of The Guardian described the book as "a gothic techno-thriller" whose conviction overcame a shaky plot, adding that it was about "escape, self-acceptance and queer love. It's about genocide and the exploitation of black bodies, self-delusion and endemic corruption, motherhood and inheritance." Christina Orlando of the Los Angeles Review of Books stated that the book was "filled with sentences so exquisite, so crushing that I found myself rereading them over and over again" but that "I'm not sure I ever felt a sense of dread or hopelessness that typically characterizes Gothic horror fiction." Julia Lindsay of the SFRA Review stated that the book "uses gothic and fantastic conventions that are particularly associated with Southern and African American literature" and that Solomon forged "a unique and fruitful link between the novel's queer and posthumanist themes."

Kirkus Reviews stated that there was "perhaps too much" going on in the book. Danny Lore of NPR stated that Solomon wrote "about Black pain in its rawest form, and we feel Vern's raw, vulnerable state throughout all of Sorrowland," but that the book ultimately placed too much emphasis on atmosphere instead of story.

Sorrowland was a finalist for the 2021 Ray Bradbury Prize given by the Los Angeles Times Book Prize.
