= An Unkindness of Ghosts =

2017 novel by Rivers Solomon

- First edition cover
- Author: Rivers Solomon
- Language: English
- Genre: Science fiction
- Publisher: Akashic Books
- Publication date: 2017
- Publication place: United States of America
- Pages: 340
- ISBN: 978-1-617-75588-0
- OCLC: 1026779516

An Unkindness of Ghosts is a 2017 science fiction novel by Rivers Solomon, exploring the conjunction between structural racism and generation ships. Solomon's first book, it was published by Akashic Books.

== Synopsis ==
On board the generation ship Matilda (named for the Clotilda), where the passengers have formed a society stratified along racial lines such that those with dark skin are relegated to lower-deck lives of servitude and harsh behavioral restrictions, Aster Gray is a lower-decks healer who must discover the hidden connection between her mother's suicide decades ago and the mysterious death of the ship's Sovereign.

== Reception ==
An Unkindness of Ghosts was a finalist for the 30th Lambda Literary Awards, and led to Solomon being shortlisted for the 2018 John W. Campbell Award for Best New Writer.

Kirkus Reviews considered the book "entertaining", calling the Matilda a "well-crafted world" and noting that the "refreshingly visible and vital" diversity of its population lessens the extent to which the dictatorial Sovereignty "feels like a familiar dystopic trope." Publishers Weekly called it "stunning", but stated that the "worldbuilding by poetry" and "many layers of metaphor" may disappoint readers seeking hard science fiction.

In Locus, Gary K. Wolfe commended Solomon's depiction of shipboard society as "sharply detailed and viscerally realized", with "characters so closely observed" and "individual scenes so tightly structured" that the book "achieves surprising power and occasional brilliance", and underlined Aster's "Heinleinesque" competence. At National Public Radio, Amal El-Mohtar lauded Solomon's use of different dialects on each deck of the Matilda, and conceded that —although she "loved the book for what it did to (her)" and "for having made (her) feel stronger and more sure in a nightmare world" — it is "not a happy book". Strange Horizons observed that the book's "Afrofuturist premise" is shaped by its "queer neuroatypical worldview" in that "all of the central characters are both gender-variant and neurodivergent", emphasizing that Aster's inability to understand figurative language and deception — and subsequent insistence on clear and unambiguous communication — "disrupts some of the more expected tropes of SF adventure narratives."
