= La Balme-d'Épy =

- Part of Val-d'Épy
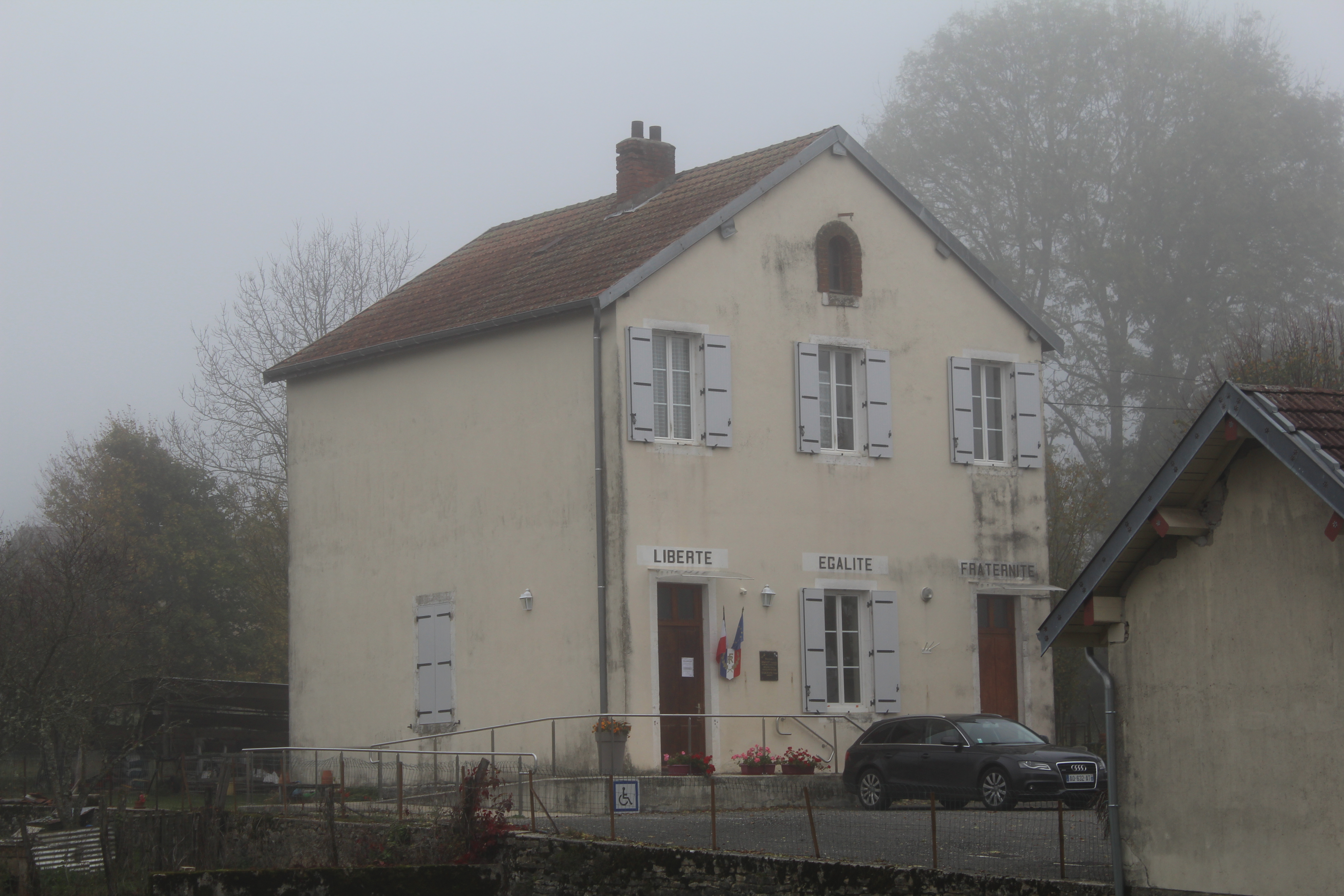
- Town hall
- Location of La Balme-d'Épy
- Location within France Location within Bourgogne-Franche-Comté
- Coordinates: 46°22′52″N 5°25′00″E
- Country: France
- Region: Bourgogne-Franche-Comté
- Department: Jura
- Arrondissement: Lons-le-Saunier
- Canton: Saint-Amour
- Commune: Val-d'Épy
- Area^{1}: 2.97 km^{2} (1.15 sq mi)
- Highest elevation: 556 m (1,824 ft)
- Lowest elevation: 372 m (1,220 ft)
- Population (2019): 51
  - Density: 17/km^{2} (44/sq mi)
- Time zone: UTC+01:00 (CET)
  - Summer (DST): UTC+02:00 (CEST)
- Postal code: 39320
- ^{1} French Land Register data, which excludes lakes, ponds, glaciers > 1 km^{2} (0.386 sq mi or 247 acres) and river estuaries.

La Balme-d'Épy (French pronunciation: [la balm depi]) is a former commune in the Jura department in the region of Bourgogne-Franche-Comté in eastern France. On 1 January 2018, it was merged into the commune of Val-d'Épy.

== See also ==
- Communes of the Jura department
