= Florentia, Jura =

Florentia
- Part of Val-d'Épy
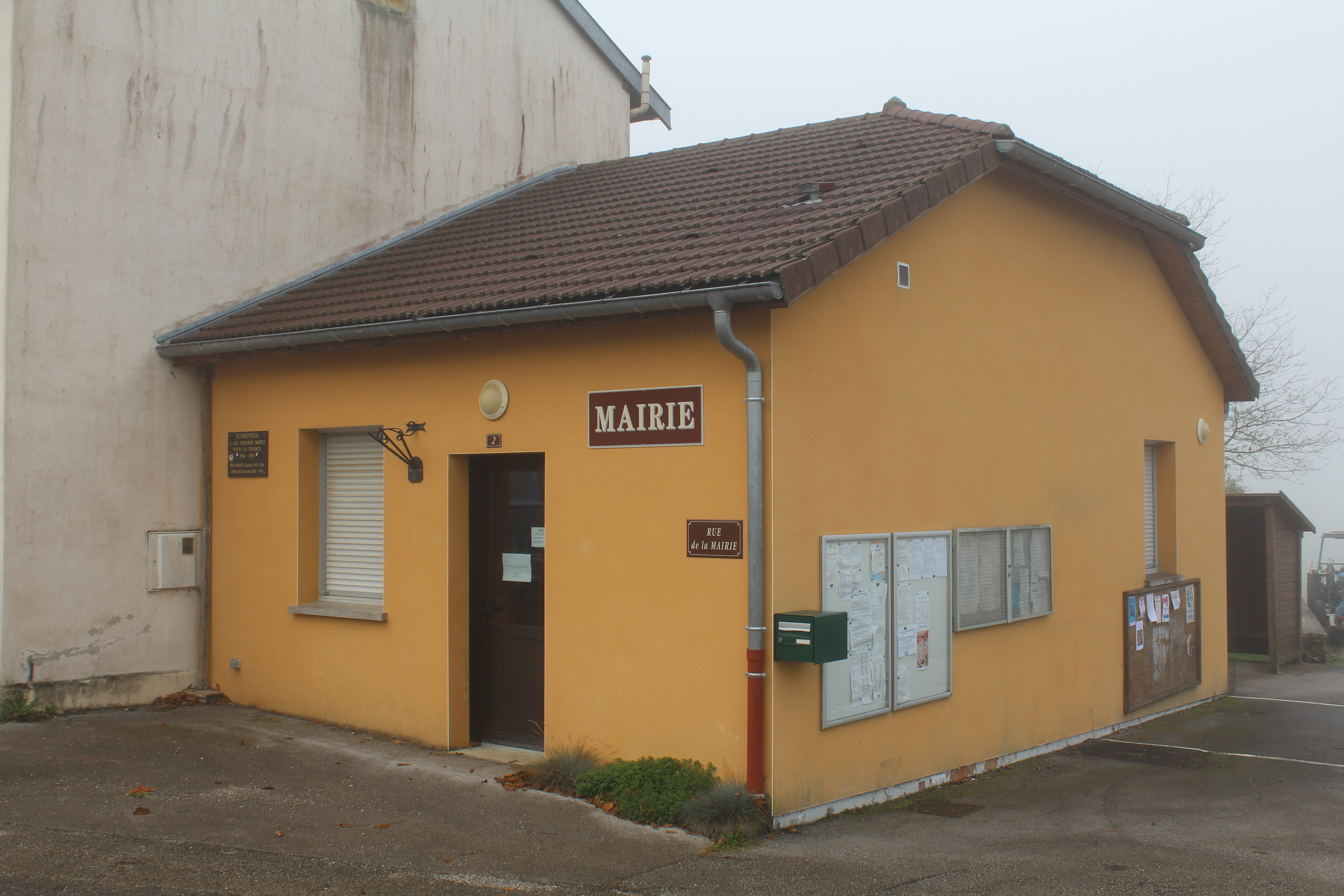
- Florentia Town hall
- Location of Florentia
- Location within France Location within Bourgogne-Franche-Comté
- Coordinates: 46°23′46″N 5°25′35″E
- Country: France
- Region: Bourgogne-Franche-Comté
- Department: Jura
- Arrondissement: Lons-le-Saunier
- Canton: Saint-Amour
- Commune: Val-d'Épy
- Area^{1}: 3.18 km^{2} (1.23 sq mi)
- Highest elevation: 556 m (1,824 ft)
- Lowest elevation: 417 m (1,368 ft)
- Population (2019): 22
  - Density: 6.9/km^{2} (18/sq mi)
- Time zone: UTC+01:00 (CET)
  - Summer (DST): UTC+02:00 (CEST)
- Postal code: 39320
- ^{1} French Land Register data, which excludes lakes, ponds, glaciers > 1 km^{2} (0.386 sq mi or 247 acres) and river estuaries.

Florentia (French pronunciation: [flɔʁɑ̃tja]) is a former commune in the Jura department in Bourgogne-Franche-Comté in eastern France. On 1 January 2016, it was merged into the commune of Val-d'Épy.

== Population ==
Historical population
Year	Pop.	±% p.a.
2007	33	—
2012	32	−0.61%
2019	22	−5.21%
Source: INSEE

== See also ==
- Communes of the Jura department
