= Senaud =

- Part of Val-d'Épy
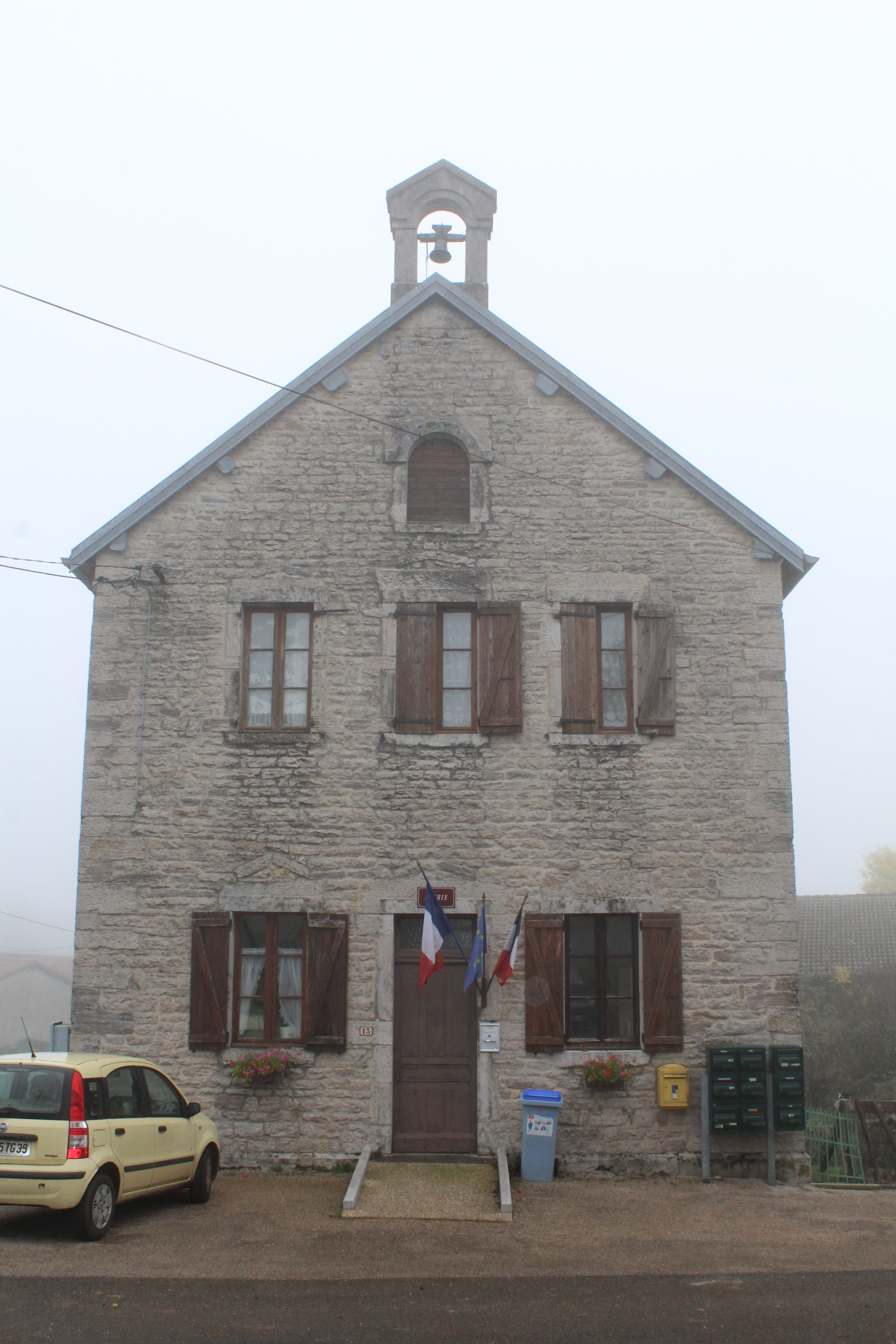
- Town hall
- Location of Senaud
- Location within France Location within Bourgogne-Franche-Comté
- Coordinates: 46°23′52″N 5°22′51″E
- Country: France
- Region: Bourgogne-Franche-Comté
- Department: Jura
- Arrondissement: Lons-le-Saunier
- Canton: Saint-Amour
- Commune: Val-d'Épy
- Area^{1}: 4.06 km^{2} (1.57 sq mi)
- Highest elevation: 596 m (1,955 ft)
- Lowest elevation: 390 m (1,280 ft)
- Population (2019): 51
  - Density: 13/km^{2} (33/sq mi)
- Time zone: UTC+01:00 (CET)
  - Summer (DST): UTC+02:00 (CEST)
- Postal code: 39160
- ^{1} French Land Register data, which excludes lakes, ponds, glaciers > 1 km^{2} (0.386 sq mi or 247 acres) and river estuaries.

Senaud (French pronunciation: [səno]) is a former commune in the Jura department in the Bourgogne-Franche-Comté region in eastern France. On 1 January 2016, it was merged into the commune of Val-d'Épy. Its population was 51 in 2019.

== See also ==
- Communes of the Jura department
