= John J. Palmer =

Author

John J. Palmer is the author of the self-published book, How to Brew and an active member of the homebrewing community.

Palmer began writing How to Brew in 1995. The website The Real Beer Page hosted the first edition of the book at howtobrew.com. Palmer self-published a print edition of How to Brew in 2000. The Third Edition was released in late May 2006.

How to Brew is frequently cited as the definitive authority on homebrewing

Palmer's follow-up books include Brewing Classic Styles: 80 Winning Recipes Anyone Can Brew with Jamil Zainasheff and Water: A Comprehensive Guide for Brewers with Colin Kaminski.

Palmer is from Midland, Michigan and attended Michigan Technological University. He graduated with a degree in Metallurgical Engineering in 1987. John worked in the space program at a failure analysis lab in Irvine, California, and he has helped design, build, and inspect hardware that is currently flying on the International Space Station.

== Books ==
- How to Brew (3rd Edition), ISBN 0-937381-88-8,
- How to Brew (4th Edition), ISBN 9781938469350,
- Brewing Classic Styles: 80 Winning Recipes Anyone Can Brew, ISBN 0-937381-92-6
- Water: A Comprehensive Guide for Brewers, ISBN 9780937381922
