= Natasha Bowen =

Nigerian-Welsh writer and teacher

- Born: Cambridge, England
- Education: Bath Spa University
- Occupation: Writer
- Writing career
- Period: 2020–present
- Genres: Fantasy, Young Adult
- Notable work: Skin of the Sea
- Website: natashabowen.com

Natasha Bowen is a Nigerian-Welsh writer and teacher. She writes fantasy books for young adults. She is best known for her New York Times Bestselling novel Skin of the Sea.

== Early life and education ==
Natasha Bowen was born in Cambridge, England, to a Nigerian Yoruba father and a Welsh mother. She studied Creative Writing at Bath Spa University. After graduating, she moved to East London, where she became a teacher.

== Personal life ==
Bowen has three children. She lives in the UK with her family.

== Career ==
Bowen's debut novel Skin of the Sea, the first book in the Of Mermaid and Orisa series inspired by her Nigerian heritage, African folklore, Yoruba culture, and her love for mermaids, was published on 2 November 2021 by Random House. She wrote the novel while teaching full-time in a school.

The novel follows Simi, a Mami Wata who travels across sea and land in search of the Supreme Creator after breaking a law that threatens the existence of all Mami Wata. The book entered the New York Times and indie bestseller lists and received several positive reviews from book reviewers who praised the novel for its similarities with The Little Mermaid and the use of Black mermaids and Yoruba culture to show the Transatlantic Slave Trade.

== Bibliography ==
Of Mermaid and Orisa Series

- Skin of the Sea. (2 November 2021) Random House
- Soul of the Deep. ( 2022) Random House
