= Hira (mythical monster) =

Songhai mythical monster

The Hira is a mythical monster who occurs in epic and folklore tales of the Songhai people, particularly the Bozo people who traditionally lived from hunting and fishing along the Niger River. The main source are the tales collected by M. A. Dupuis Yakouba at the start of the twentieth century. The Hira is a legendary variety of buffalo known for incredible force and brutality.

The Hira is the main opponent in one of the epic tales about the culture hero Moussa Gname (also Mousa-Gname, Mousa-Djinni, "Moses the Son of a Spirit"). A woman falls asleep under a tree and is impregnated by a spirit that dwells in the tree. The boy child is named for Moses because, like Moses, his father is not known. Moussa's spirit-father teaches him hunting magic, and when the Hira ravages the countryside, Moussa and his fiancée (courageous and trained in magic like he is) defeat the monster. A second Hira comes, and a diviner says that the monster can only be killed by a female elephant--who is disguised as the chief's girlfriend. She transforms and becomes a female Hira, falls asleep near a pond, and when the Hira comes to drink at the pond he begins licking her. She pulls four hairs from his tail and gives them to Moussa; the next day, all Moussa has to do is show the Hira his own hairs for the monster to lie down and be killed.

== Bibliography ==
- Belcher, Stephen: Epic Traditions of Africa (Bloomington: Indiana UP, 1999; ISBN 0253335019)
- Belcher, Stephen: African Myths of Origin (New York: Penguin, 2005; ISBN 9780140449457)
- Dupuis Yakouba, M. A.: Les Gow ou Chasseurs du Niger, Legendes Songaï de la Région de Tomboctou (Paris: Leroux, 1911)
