= Mami Wata =

African water spirit

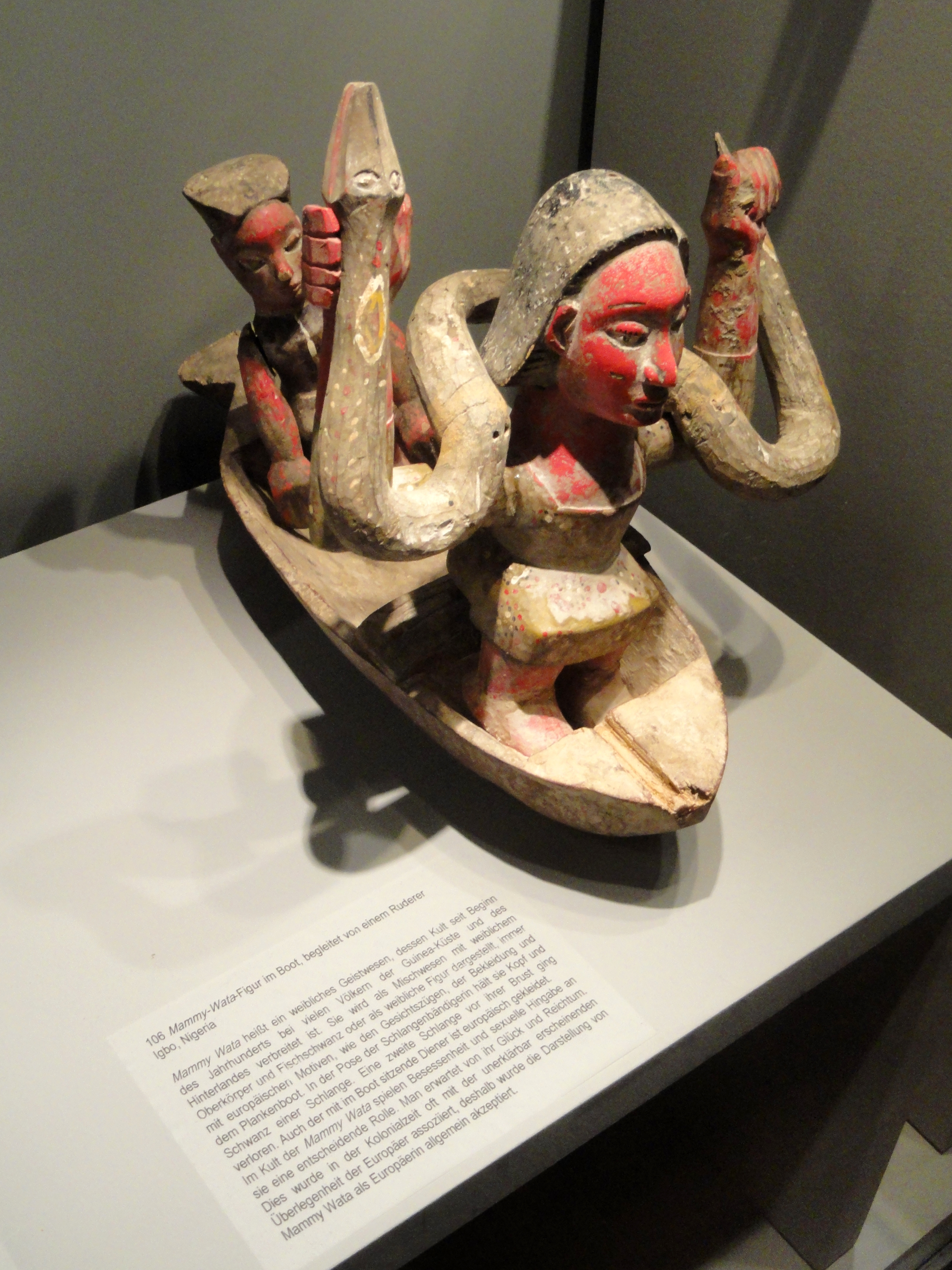
Depiction of Mami Wata from Nigeria on display at the Museum Five Continents in Münich, Germany.

Mami Wata (also called Mammy Water and Bantu: Mami Muntu, Mamba Muntu) or similar is a mermaid, water spirit, and/or goddess in the folklore of parts of Western Africa, Central Africa, Eastern Africa, and Southern Africa. Historically, scholars trace her origins to early encounters between Europeans and West Africans in the 15th century, where Mami Wata developed from depictions of European mermaids. Mami Wata subsequently joined native pantheons of deities and spirits in parts of Africa.

Historically, Mami Wata is conceived of as an exotic female entity from Europe or elsewhere, often depicted as a white woman with long, flowing hair and a particular interest in objects foreign to West Africans that her adherents place at her shrines. In the mid-19th century, Mami Wata's iconography became particularly influenced by an image of snake charmer Nala Damajanti spreading from Europe. This snake charmer print soon overtook Mami Wata's earlier mermaid iconography in popularity in some parts of Africa.

Mami is a goddess of wealth, fertility, healing, wisdom, and profound beauty. She holds the power to manipulate the oceans and rivers, and possesses the ability to transform in order to seduce and mesmerize humans with her alluring beauty.

Additionally, Hindu imagery from Indian merchants has influenced depictions of Mami Wata in some areas. Papi Wata, a male consort or reflection of Mami Wata sometimes depicted as modeled from the Hindu deity Hanuman, can be found in some Mami Wata traditions, sometimes under the influence of Hindu imagery.

Mami Wata is especially venerated in parts of Africa and in the Atlantic diaspora and has also been demonized in some African Christian and Islamic communities in the region. Mami Wata has appeared in a variety of media depictions and in literary works.

== Etymology ==
The names Mami Wata, Mami Wota, or Mammy Wata derive from the English language nouns mother and water in multiple English-based creole languages in Africa, including Krio and Naijá.

Mamba Muntu, Mami Muntu, or Dona Fish is the Central African variant of the water spirit that exists in Angola, the Democratic Republic of the Congo and the Republic of the Congo. Having fused with Portuguese folklore, her depictions were partially inspired by the sereia. She has been identified as a mermaid, a crocodile, and a snake.

== Associated spirits in the diaspora ==
Some scholars have posited that Mami Wata is related to similar water spirits found in the Caribbean and South America, including Lasirèn, Mae d’Agua, Maman de l’Eau, saint Marta la Dominadora, and Watra-mama (Guyana and Suriname). It is thought that these related spirits developed from beliefs in Mami Wata held by Africans who were enslaved and forcibly brought to these regions. In the southern United States, Mamba Muntu or Mami Wata manifested in the form of simbi and kianda water spirits with origins in Angola and the Congo region.

== Development ==
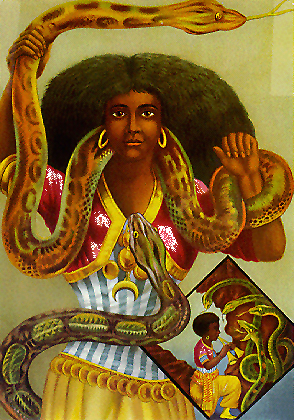
Chromolithograph of a snake charmer, inspired by the performer Maladamatjaute (Nala Damajanti). Printed in the 1880s by the Adolph Friedlander Company in Hamburg, the poster gave rise to a common image of Mami Wata.

Scholars trace the origins of Mami Wata to encounters to depictions of European mermaids witnessed by West Africans as early as the 1400s and 1500s. As summarized by scholar and adherent Henry John Drewal:

Substantial evidence suggests that the concept of Mami Wata has its origins in the first encounters of Africans and Europeans in the fifteenth century. Her first representations were probably derived from European images of mermaids and marine sculptures. As an Afro-Portuguese ivory shows, an African sculptor (probably Sapi, on the coast of Sierra Leone) was commissioned to create a mermaid image for his patrons as early as 1490–1530. And an eighteenth- or nineteenth-century ship’s figurehead now in Ijebu-Ode, Nigeria, is called Mami Wata by its owners.

A second version of the mermaid from European folklore with two tails also likely influenced depictions of Mami Wata localized especially to the Benin Republic. Scholars trace this motif to the influence of Portuguese depictions of mermaids. In some regions, she is typically represented as free of any kind of social bonds and as a foreign entity, and "broadly identified with Europeans rather than any African ethnic group or ancestors".

Around the mid-1800s, a lithograph of the snake charmer Nala Damajanti from Europe became popular associated with imagery around Mami Wata, likely originating in Hamburg, Germany.

In the 1940s to the 1950s Hindu religious imagery from Indian merchants and films began to strongly influence Mami Wata imagery on the Ghana-Nigeria coast. Drewal records the following account from a male Yoruba Mami Wata devotee who sells Hindu prints in Togo (notations are that of Drewal):

formerly, during the colonial period, we had the pictures [Hindu images], but we didn't know their meaning. People just liked them to put them in their rooms. But then Africans started to study them too – about what is the meaning of these pictures that they are putting lights, candles, and incense there every time. I think they are using the power to collect our money away, or how? So we started to befriend the Indians to know their secret about the pictures. From there the Africans also tried to join some of their societies in India and all over the world to know much about the pictures. Reading some of their books, I could understand what they mean.

== Folk belief ==
Writing from research conducted from 1965 to 1966 at the Catherine Mills Rehabilitation Center in Liberia, at the time the only psychiatric center in Liberia, former director Ronald Wintrob recorded beliefs among individuals who venerated Mami Wata in the region. Wintrob records that "beliefs in Mammy Water are held by the vast majority of Liberians". Wintrob recorded that "confirmed that some ten per cent of male patients requiring in-patient treatment for psychotic disorders, revealed a system of delusions relating to possession by Mammy Water".

Wintrob summarizes the conceptualization of Mammy Water in Liberia at the time as follows:

Mammy Water is believed to be a water spirit of extraordinary power, who is generally described as a beautiful light-skinned woman with very long, light-coloured hair. She is usually conceptualized as a white woman. Sometimes the description stipulates that her lower half resembles a fish, mermaid style. Her hair is thought to be her proudest attribute. People believe that she lives in a mansion under the water, from which she some times ventures on to the shore to comb out her long hair with a golden comb. This comb is thought to be her most valued possession.

Wintrob records that in Liberian Mammy Water folk belief, anyone who has contact with her will become wealthy and gained good luck. One of his informants, a man from the Vai people, provides the following account:

If you ever come across Mammy Water sitting down a rock combing her hair, you should yell at her. If you yell while she is combing her hair, she might drop her golden comb. You pick it up and take the golden comb home with you. Mammy Water will come after you for a bit but you must not give her the comb until you have gotten your wish. Even then you should keep on wishing for something more. When you ask her for money you will get rich.

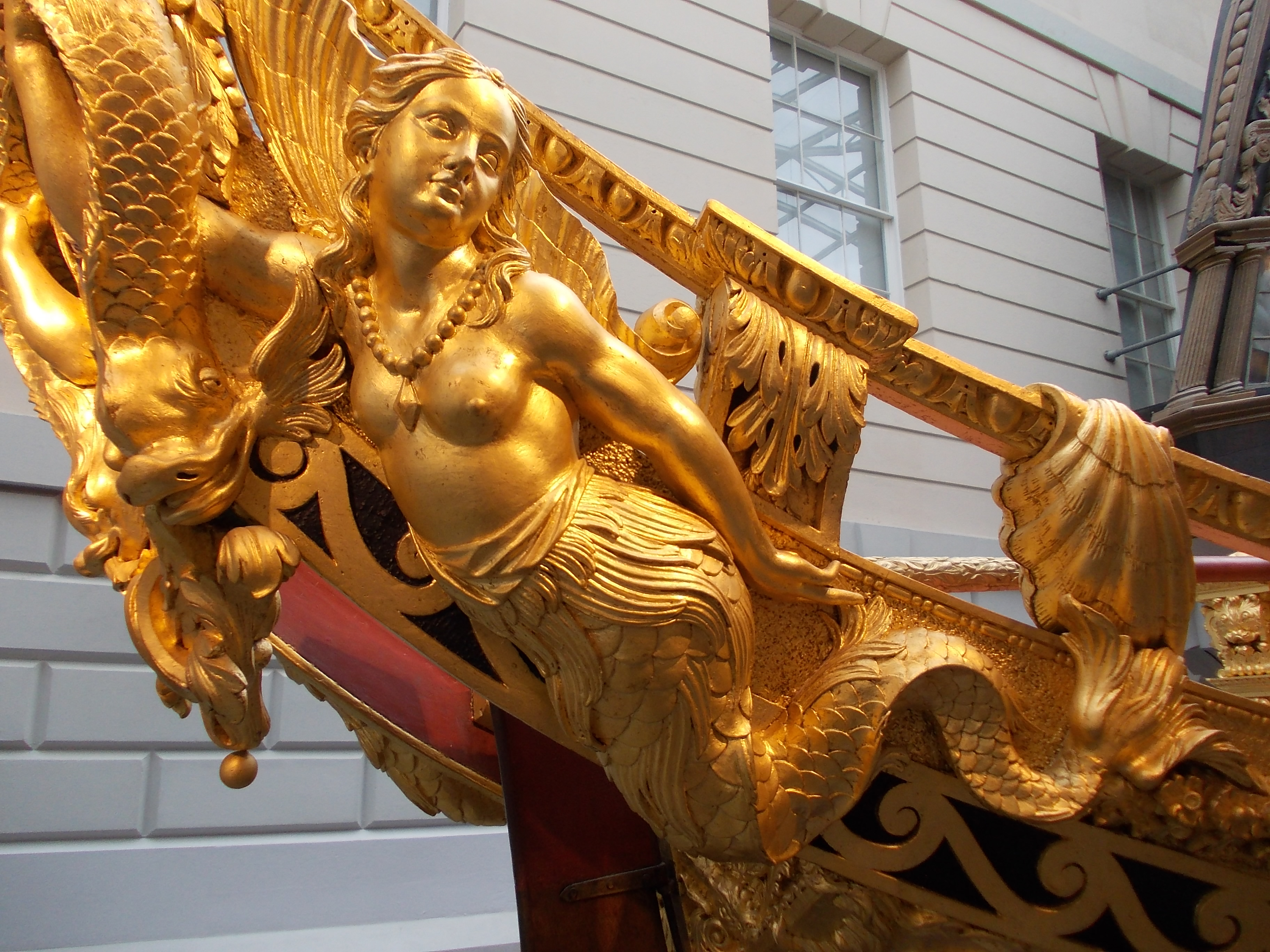
An English depiction of a European Mermaid by James Richards on Prince Frederick's Barge, 1732

Mammy Water was typically believed to visit people in their sleep at night. According to another informant, a man from the Kissi people, she grants wealth in exchange for sexual celibacy:

They say Mammy Water sits on top of rocks by the water side. If you see her and she has interest in you, you will see her every now and then. If she has interest to really help you, to give you money, then you will see her in dreams and you and she will have to make a certain compact. If you are a man, you must not marry any woman. If you keep to this promise, she brings money every time she visits you. Sometimes she will enter the room in the form of a snake, then change herself into a beautiful white woman. They say sex must take place between you. Then you will become wealthy. People will say: 'This man used to be a poor man, now he's wealthy. The only thing is he will never marry. He may have women living in his house but none will ever sleep in his bedroom'.

Wintrob records that this was not always the case: in some instances folk belief dictated that Mammy Water's contact need not be celibate with her and could in fact have a large family.

According to the findings of Barbara Frank of LMU Munich, Mami Wata’s gifts, wealth and power comes at a cost: the man must never have any sexual contact with another women, thus being unable to have children of any kind. In addition, if they become unfaithful and have such interactions, it is said Mami Wata will strip the man of his wealth, as well as make them fall ill or become insane.

Mammy Water may also gift extra-sensory perception, including foresight and the ability to see that which others cannot, or especially swift travels. Some groups believe that Mammy Water does not contact everyone but rather that the ability to contact her is inherited.

Mirrors are seen as a symbol for Mami Wata, primarily used within shrines dedicated to her as a way to get her attention towards her devotees. It is said her own vanity makes her fond of looking at herself in the mirror, making it a prime offering for her followers seeking her gaze.

== Papi Wata ==
A secondary development of Mami Wata in some traditions is Papi Wata, a male entity associated with Mami Wata. In parts of West Africa, Hindu depictions of Hanuman, a divine figure or deity typically depicted with monkey features, is interpreted as Papi Wata.
